= List of Norwegian dishes =

This is a list of Norwegian dishes and other dishes related to the food culture of the Norwegian people, from Norway. The cuisine of Norway is similar to the rest of Scandinavia, but the countries all have individual dishes and foods as well.

The following list contains both foods and dishes originating in Norway, as well as foods from other countries which have been a part of Norwegian food culture for hundreds of years, and have become a separate distinct Norwegian version of that dish.

== Description ==
Norwegian cuisine in its traditional form is based largely on the raw materials readily available in Norway and its mountains, wilderness, and coast. It differs in many respects from continental cuisine through the stronger focus on game and fish. Many of the traditional dishes are the result of using conserved materials, necessary because of the long winters.

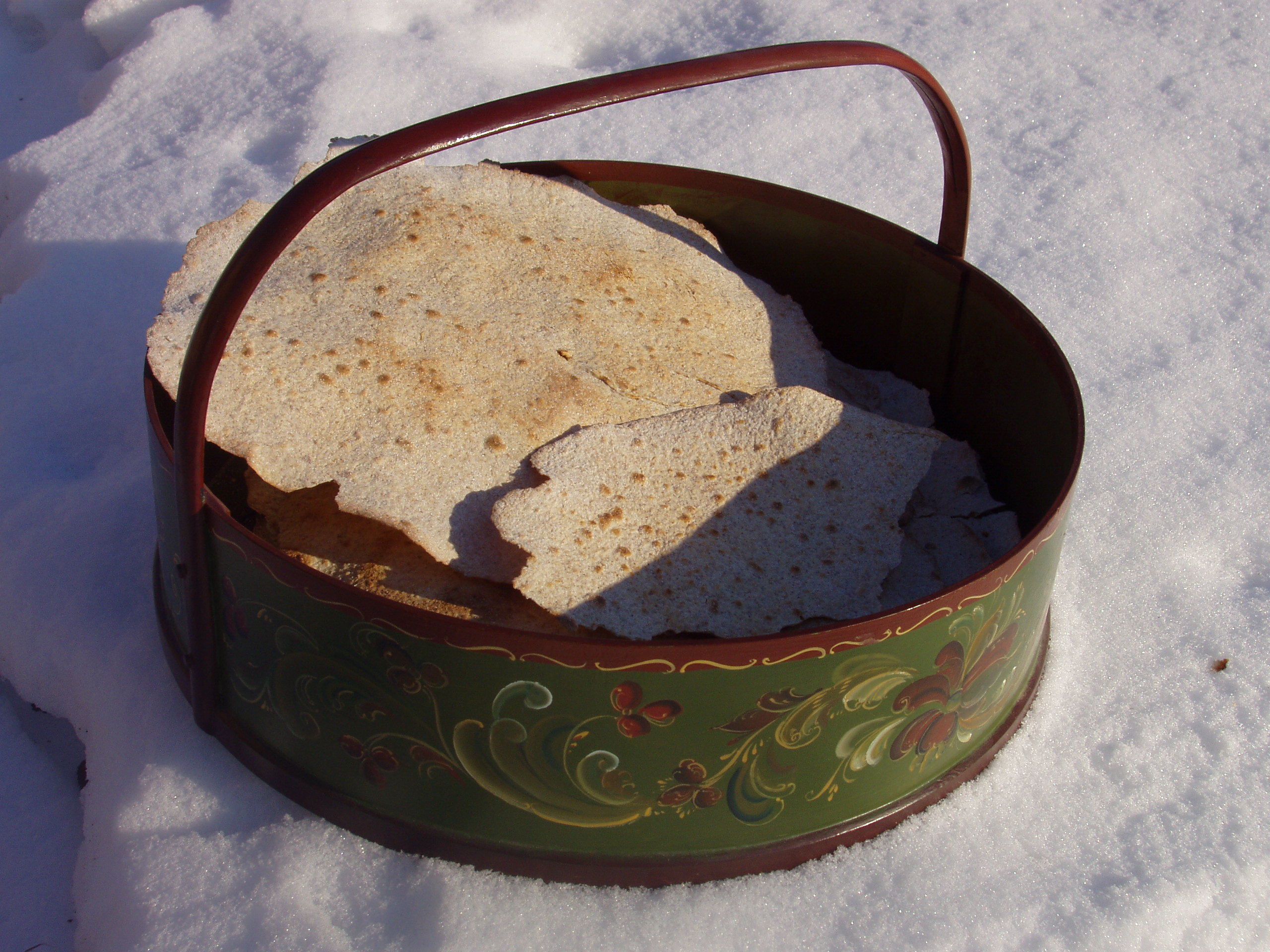
A traditional bread basket with flatbrød

=== Bread dishes ===
- Arme riddere – the Norwegian version of French toast; once only a dessert dish, it is now eaten for brunch or breakfast. The most common spices are cinnamon and cardamom.
  - Rike riddere – a version of French toast with more extravagant ingredients, usually served with whipped cream, berries, jam and nuts.
- Bolle – a small wheat bun pastry, usually with a round top and flat bottom, that contains wheat flour, sugar, yeast, eggs, milk, water and often also cardamom and hornsalt. Buns can be served whole or split in half with butter and toppings as a dessert, a snack or often as an accompaniment to coffee. They often contain raisins (rosinbolle) or chocolate (sjokoladebolle).
- Flatbrød – a traditional Norwegian unleavened bread which is usually eaten with fish, salted meats and soups. Originally it was the staple food of Norwegian farmers, shepherds and peasants. The basic ingredients are barley flour, salt, and water.
- Grovbrød ("coarse bread") – a bread in which at least 50 percent or more of the flour quantity is wholemeal flour, whole grain or bran.

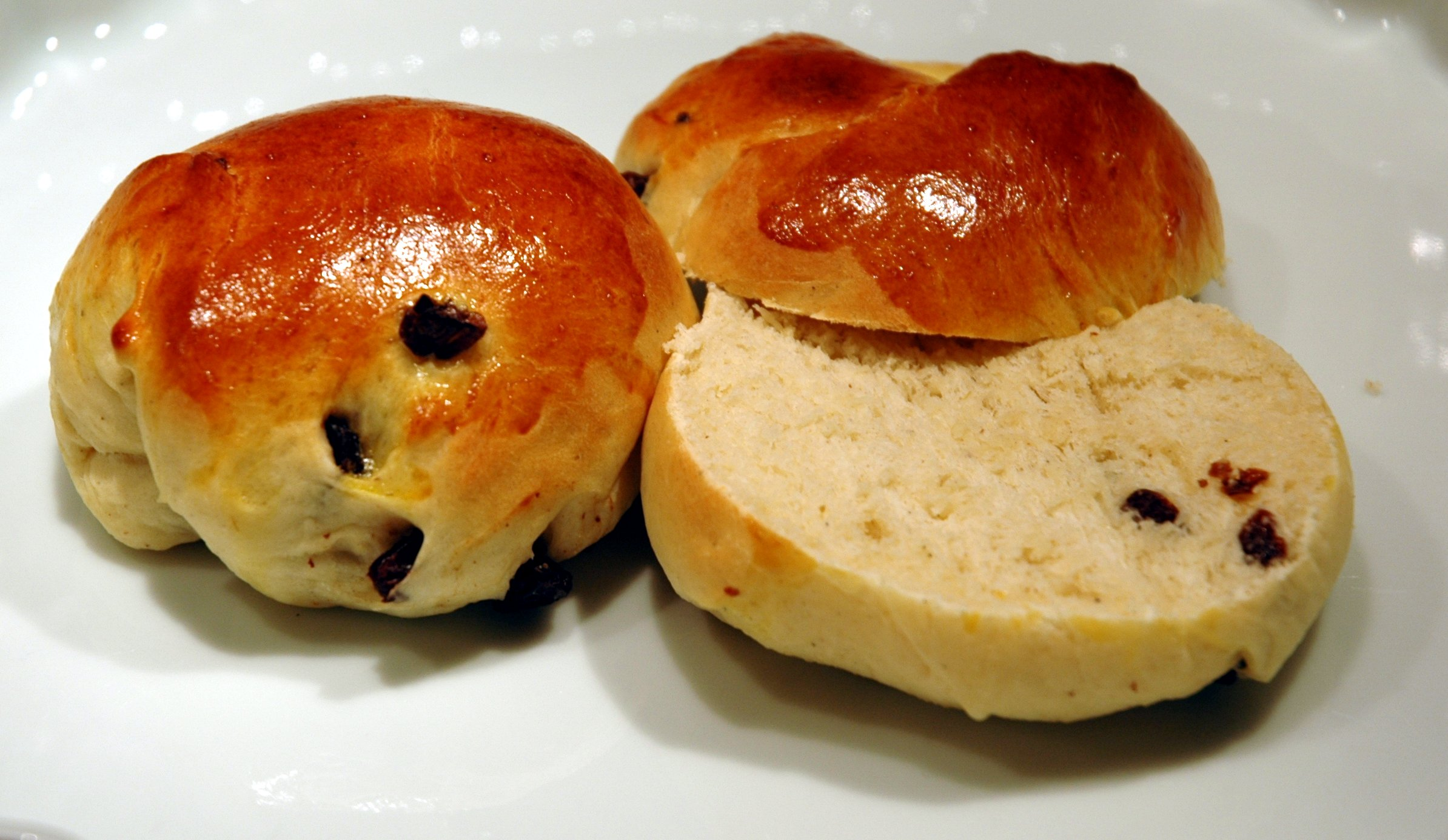
Homemade wheat buns with raisins

- Kamkake ("comb cake") – a baked good that consists of wheat flour, rye flour, yeast and milk.
- Kavring – a baked product made from buns or (often sweet) bread that has been dried by heat. The buns can be wheat-based or made from other types of flour. Crushed kavring, called strøkavring, is used, amongst other things, for making kjøttkaker and in the traditional dessert tilslørte bondepiker.
- Kneippbrød – a whole wheat bread that is the most frequently consumed bread in Norway.
- Knekkebrød – a flat and dry cracker, containing mostly rye flour. Commonly eaten for breakfast or lunch, with cheese, cold meats or other spreads.
- Krotekake – a flatbread associated with the region of Hardanger, commonly decorated with a cross-hatch pattern.

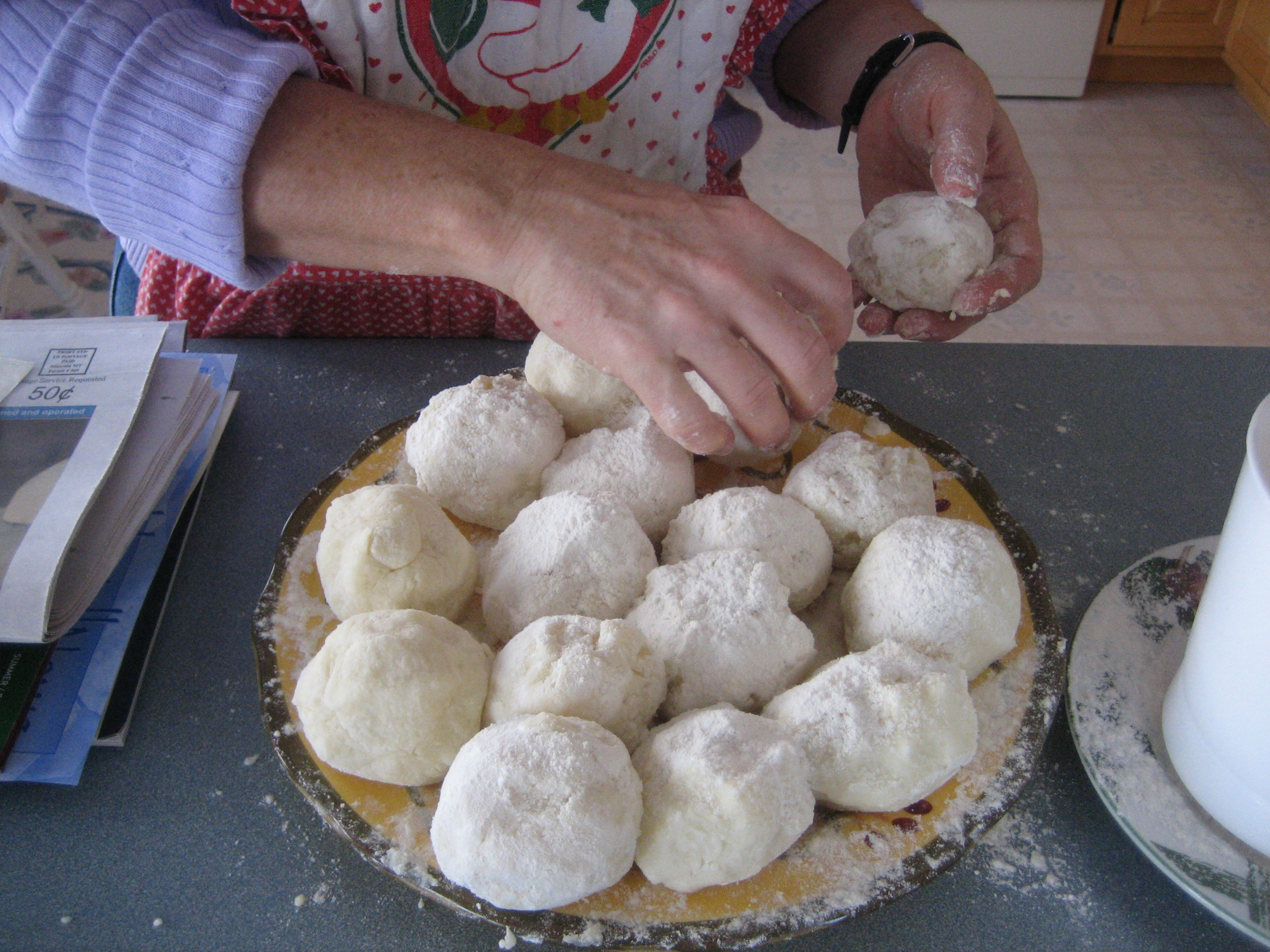
Balls of lefse dough waiting to be flattened with a rolling pin

- Lefse – a traditional soft Norwegian flatbread. It is made with flour, can include riced potatoes, and includes butter, and milk, cream, or lard. It is cooked on a large, flat griddle.
  - Tynnlefse ("thin lefse") is a variation made in central Norway. Tynnlefse is rolled up with butter, sugar, and cinnamon (or with butter and brown sugar).
  - Tjukklefse ("thick lefse") is thicker and often served with coffee as a cake.
  - Potetlefse ("potato lefse") is similar to and used like tynnlefse, but made with potatoes.
  - Lompe or potetkake ("potato cake") is the smaller version of the potato lefse, and usually made with only boiled potatoes, flour and salt. It is often used in place of a hot dog bun and can be used to roll up sausages, known as pølse med lompe in Norway. It is frequently eaten on Norway's Constitution Day, May 17. Toppings include ketchup and mustard, but can also include raw onions, pickles, and other types of relish.
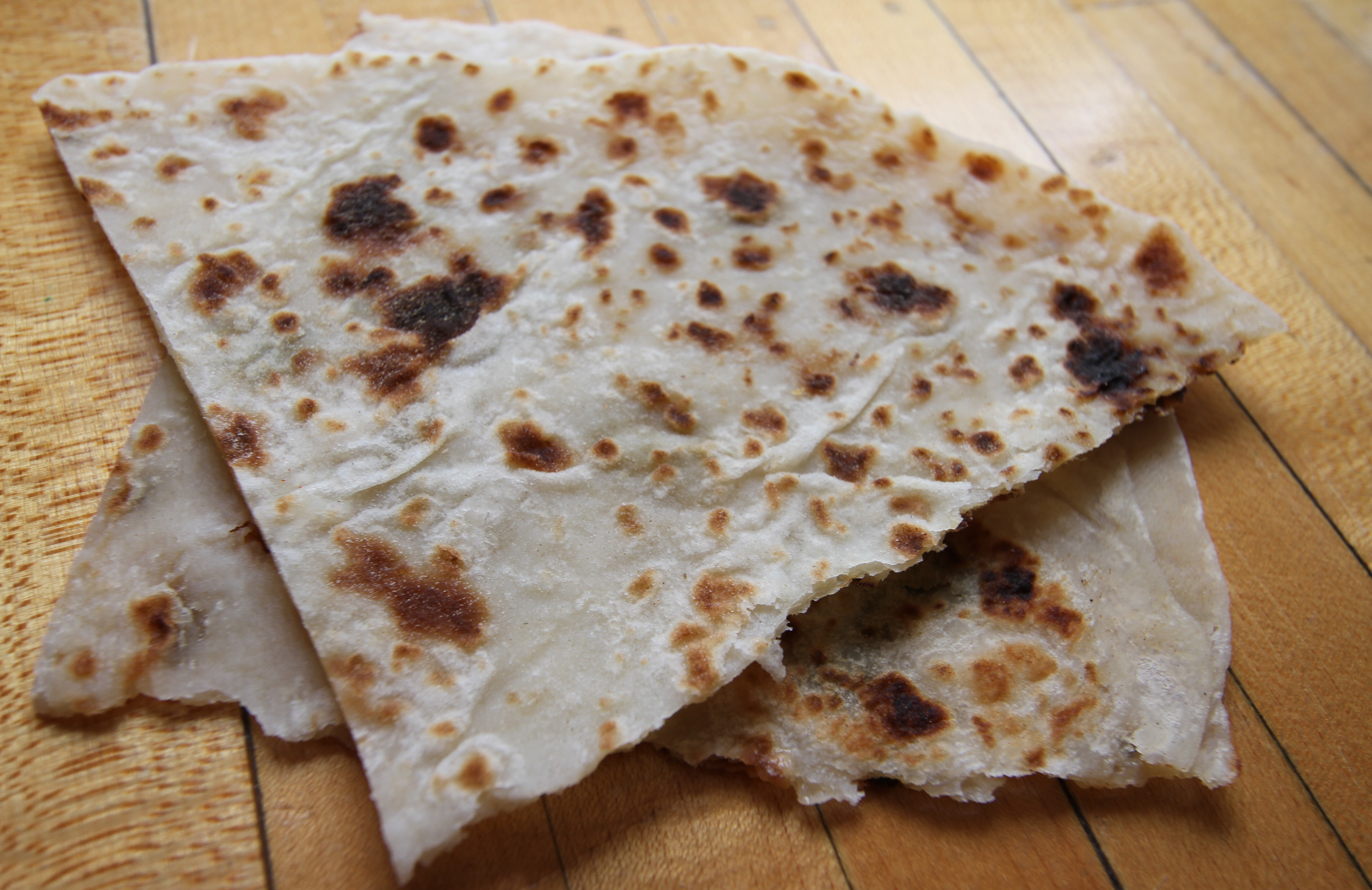
    Prepared potato lefse
  - Møsbrømlefse is a variation common to the Salten district in Nordland in Northern Norway. Møsbrømlefse is eaten with a sweetened sauce made of brunost, a type of cheese, flour, and sugar. It is ready when the møsbrømlefse is warm and the butter is melted.
  - Nordlandslefse ("Nordland lefse") is a chunky small lefse made of butter, syrup, sugar, eggs, and flour. Originally created in Western Norway as a treat for fishermen who worked at the Lofoten Fishery.
  - Anislefse ("aniseed lefse") is made on the coast of Hordaland. It resembles thin lefse but is slightly thicker, and its texture is distinguished by large amounts of whole aniseed.
- Pannekake – Norwegian pancakes are similar to French-style crêpes, and can be served both sweet or savory. Sweet pancakes are served with sugar, jam or chocolate spreads. Savory pancakes are often served for dinner, with bacon, jam, potatoes or sour cream.

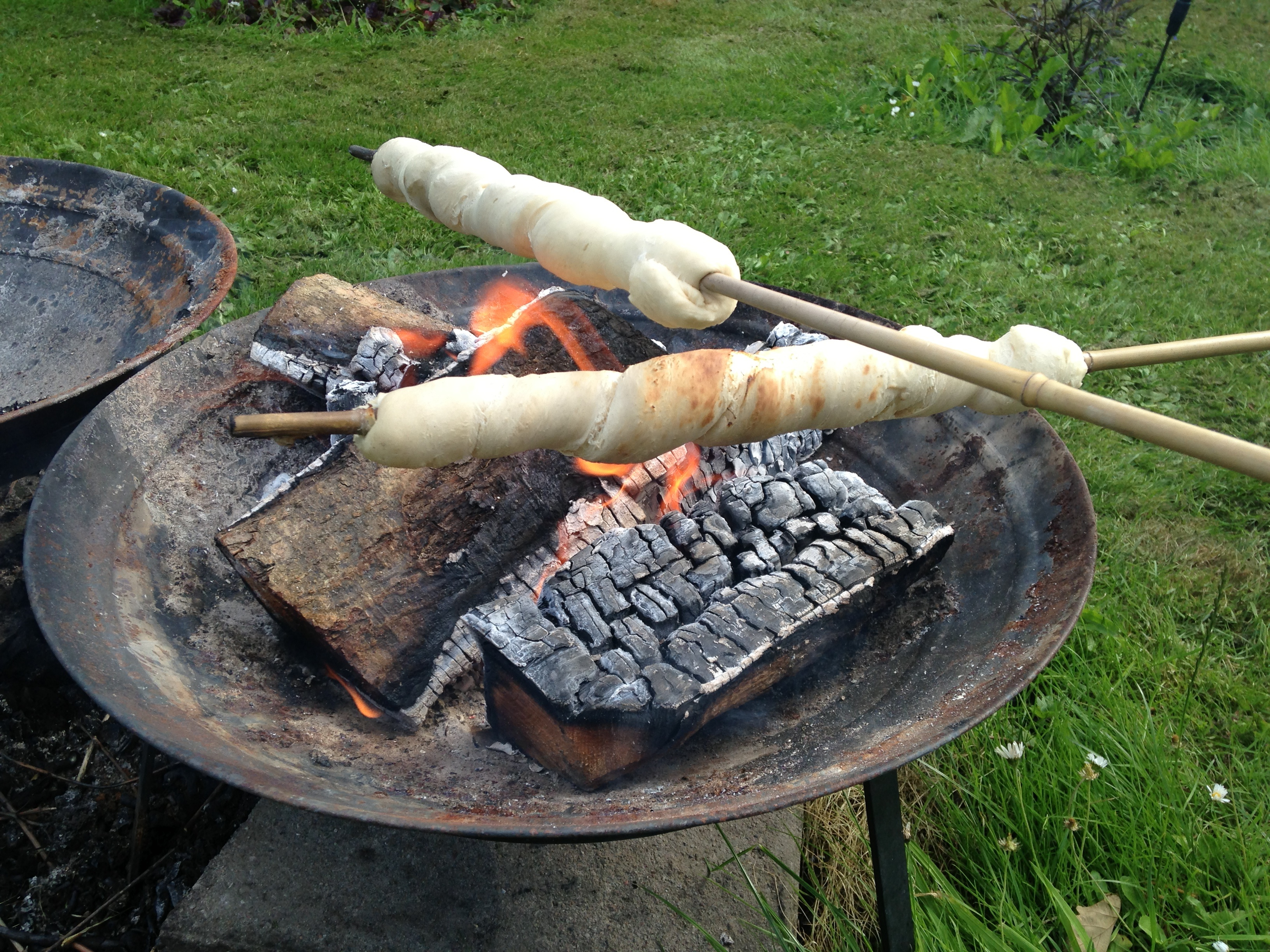
Pinnebrød made over an open fire

- Pinnebrød – a type of bread in which the dough has been rolled into a long sausage shape, twisted over the end of a stick, and baked over an open fire.
- Purke (bakverk) – a baked good with a local connection to the Halden district. It is a sweetened flat wheat bread with a hole in the middle. Originally, it was a coarser yeast baked good, and there was both wheat and rye flour in the dough, which also contained a small portion of syrup. It was usually large enough to make up a meal of bread alone. Today they have gradually become smaller, and are made with less coarse flour. In return, some bakers have introduced an even rougher version of the original baked good, now under the name "råne".
- Rengakaka – a pastry of barley flour, butter, salt of hartshorn and milk. The dough is rolled out into thin strips, about 60 cm long, and the strips are made as seven rings on top of each other in a spiral. Fried rengakaker become crispy and can be eaten with butter and cheese or salty toppings.
- Rugbrød – a type of bread made with various proportions of flour from rye grain. It can be light or dark in color, depending on the type of flour used and the addition of coloring agents, and is typically denser than bread made from wheat flour.
- Rundstykke – a small, usually round or oblong individual loaf of bread served as a meal accompaniment (eaten plain or with butter).
- Skjenning – a triangular, leaf-thin flatbread that is coated with freshly strained milk and sugar on one side. Skjenning is traditionally used as a condiment to sodd in certain parts of Norway.

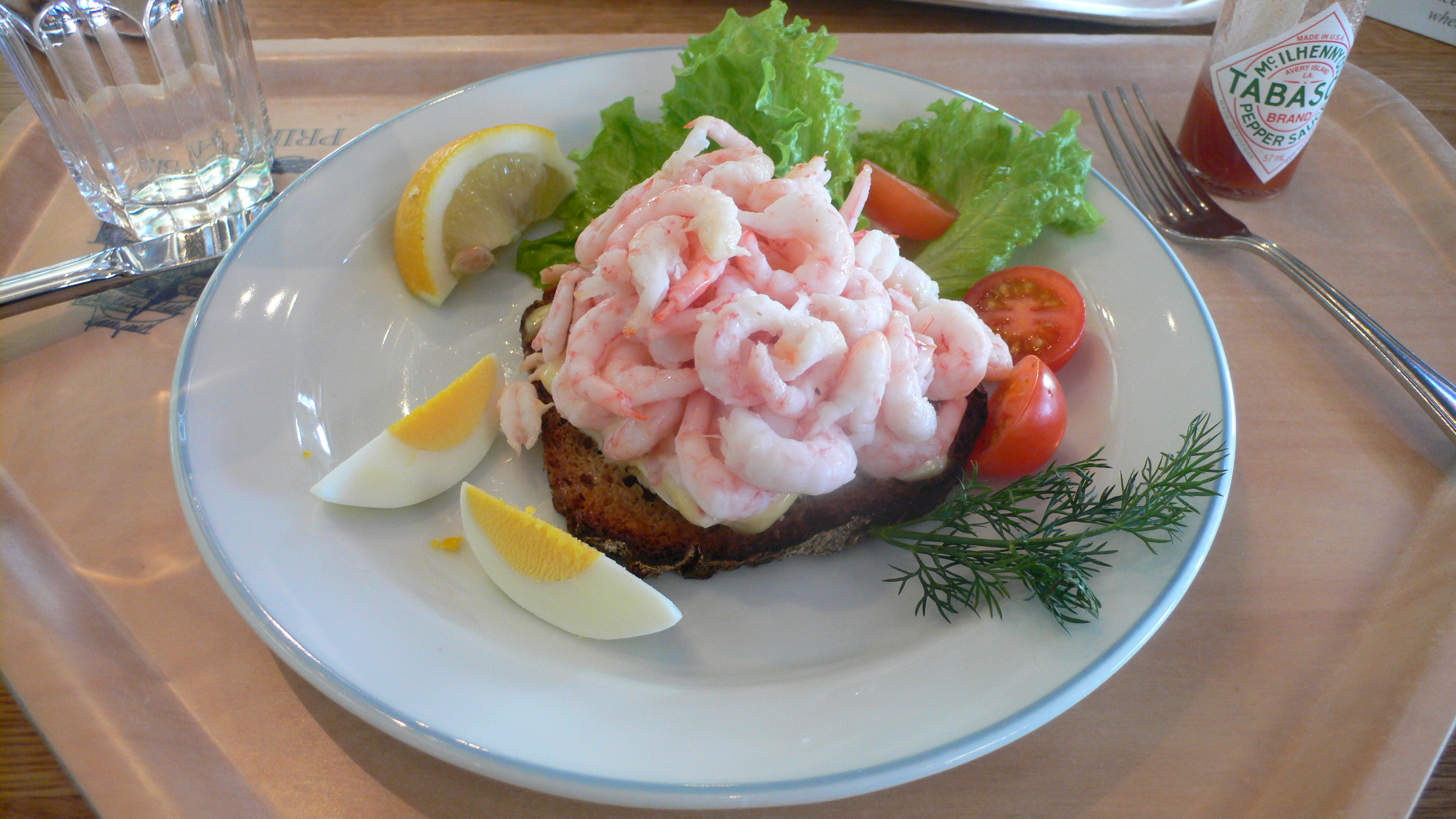
A rekesmørbrød with mayonnaise, shrimp and garnish

- Smørbrød – a traditional open-faced sandwich that usually consists of a piece of buttered bread topped with commercial or homemade cold cuts, pieces of meat or fish, cheese or spreads, and garnishes.
  - Rekesmørbrød – an open-faced sandwich using white bread, usually topped with mayonnaise, pepper, lemon juice, dill and shrimp.
  - Karbonadesmørbrød – a classic lunch dish consisting of a hot karbonade placed on top of a cold slice of bread, preferably light or white bread. The dish can be served as is, or combined with fried onions, fried eggs or pea stew.
- Vaffel – waffles in Norway are typically associated with the Constitution Day, birthdays and other holidays. Which toppings they are served with varies greatly, sometimes depending on region or context, and they may also be eaten plain. Common toppings include butter (or equivalent), sour cream, jam (most commonly strawberry or raspberry), brunost and sugar. Waffles may also be used for a hot dog in place of a lompe or hot dog bun.
- Svele also known as lapp (plural: lapper) – a batter-based cake. They are usually eaten for afternoon coffee or as a snack between meals, served with butter and either sugar or brunost, folded in half to the shape of a crescent. Baking soda and salt of hartshorn are used as rising agent in svele, which give this cake its characteristic flavour.

=== Meat dishes ===
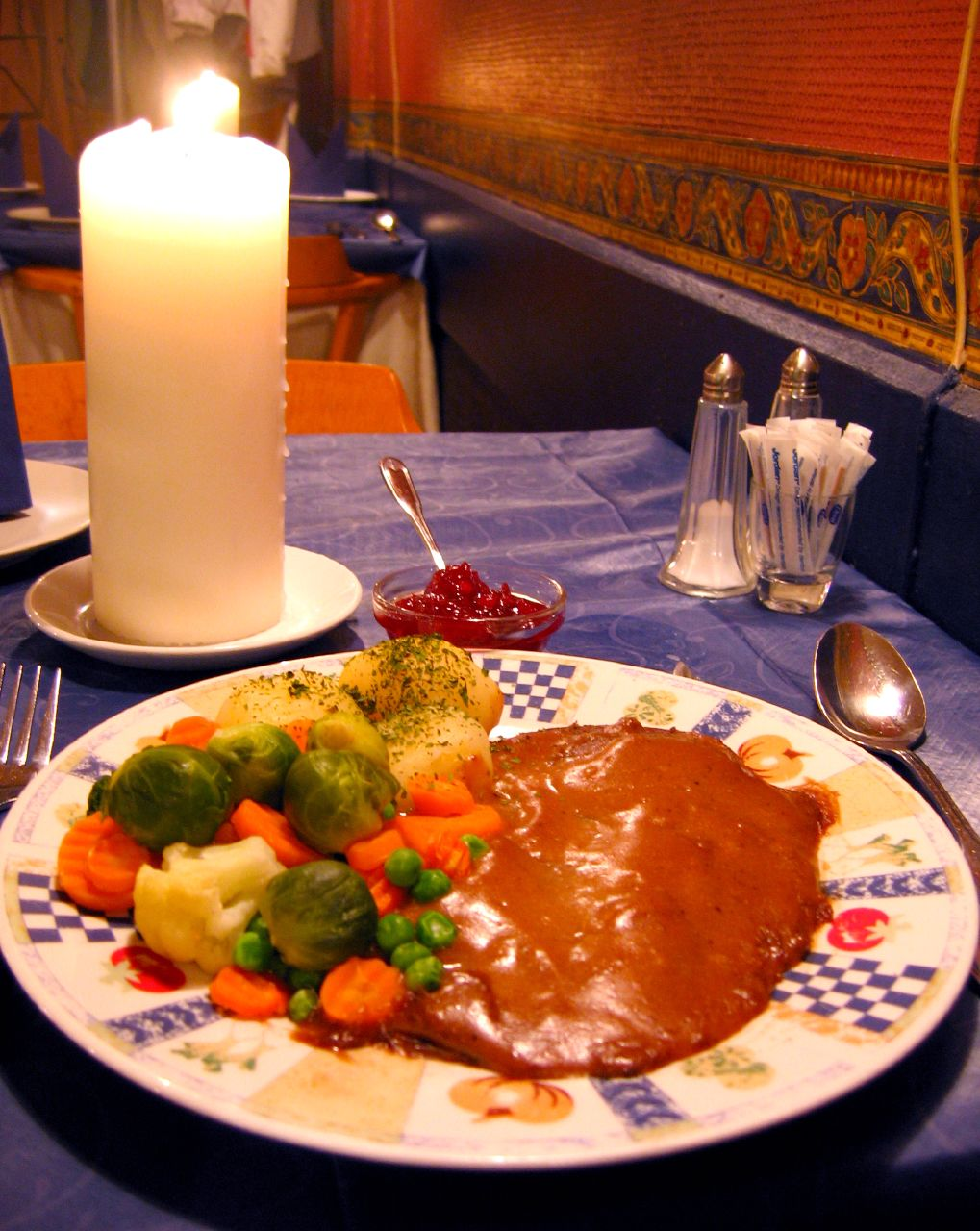
Finnbiff (Reindeer steak) served with potatoes, brown sauce, vegetables and lingonberry jam

- Betasuppe – soup with salted or smoked pork knuckles, potatoes and vegetables.
- Blodklubb – a variation of raspeball containing blood as an ingredient, as well as potato and spices.
- Blodpudding – a distinct type of blood sausage, made from pork or beef blood, with pork fat or beef suet, and a cereal, usually oatmeal, oat groats, or barley groats.
- Blodpølse – sausage made from the blood of cattle and pigs, lard, wheat flour, onions and salt. Blood sausage is served in Norway according to local traditions with, among other things, brown cheese, sugar, cranberry jam, syrup, melted butter, fried pork, cured ham, potatoes and white sauce. It is served both hot (fried) and cold.
- Brennsnute – a traditional dish from Sunnmøre that is also consumed elsewhere in the country. The soup can be made from fresh meat combined with vegetables and varieties of salted meat, such as leftover fenalår. It may also contain barley groats.
- Elghakk – a dish from Østerdalen with minced moose meat, potatoes and onions – sometimes also carrot, celery root and cream or sour cream.
- Fenalår – a traditional cured meat made from salted and dried leg of lamb, often served with other preserved food at a Christmas buffet or at Norwegian Constitution Day.
- Finker (matrett) – a dish made from boiled, minced meat and offal. The meat is fried in fat with onions, apples and herbs and fat is added. Also served with coarse rye bread, a little vinegar and beetroot.
- Finnbiff – steak or the back of reindeer, sliced thinly (usually while the meat is still frozen so that it is easier to cut through), fried in fat (traditionally in reindeer fat, but butter and oil are more common nowadays), and spiced with black pepper and salt. Finally, some water, cream, or beer is added, and it is cooked until tender. Sometimes brown cheese is added. The dish is served with mashed potatoes and lingonberry preserves or, more traditionally, with raw lingonberries mashed with sugar.
- Fleskasos – a bacon-based dish from Tysnes Municipality, made with bacon, butter, milk, flour and spices.
- Fleskepølse – a traditional dish that is used as a topping for bread. It contains pork meat, salt, onion, cloves and pepper and the consistency is soft. A more flavored variant is røkt fleskepølse (smoked pork sausage).
- Flotmylje – an old dish from Valle Municipality in Setesdal. It is made from stock of lamb meat. Many also use leftovers from the traditional setedalssuppe (Setedal soup). The flatbrød is broken into pieces to make what in the Valle dialect is called "flatbraudsoll". It is served with butter and broth or soup on top.
- Fårepølse – a delicacy usually made from dried meat of sheep or lamb, but sometimes it is also made from goat, beef or pork. This sausage is mainly used as a topping for various types of bread or as a side dish for other dishes.
- Fårikål – the national dish of Norway, consisting of pieces of mutton with bone, cabbage, whole black pepper and occasionally a little wheat flour, cooked for several hours in a casserole, traditionally served with potatoes boiled in their skins.

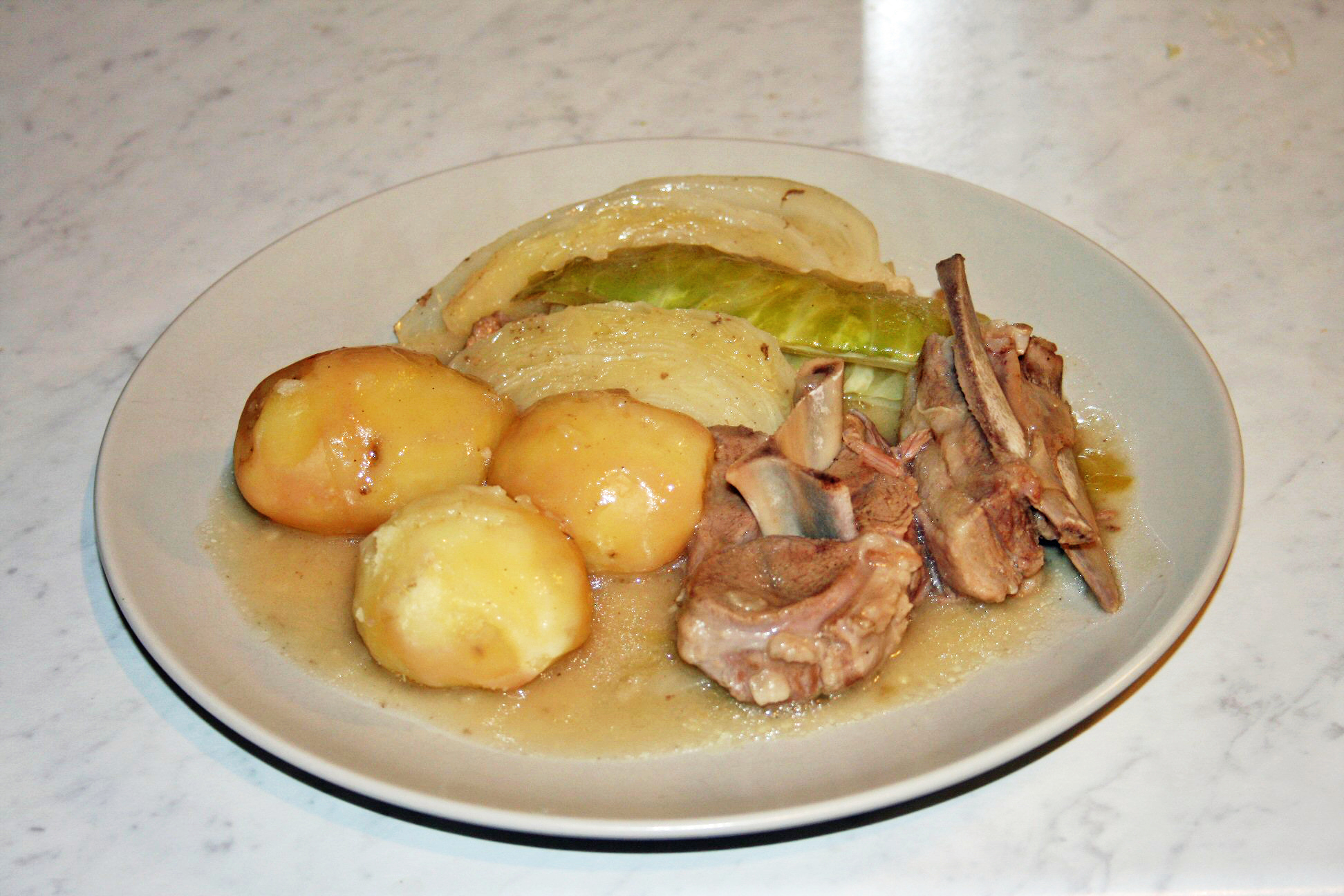
A plate of fårikål

- Gravet elg – sweet and salt-cured moose. It is the same procedure as for gravlaks, but akevitt is often substituted for brandy, and juniper berries for dill.
- Hakkemat – a dish made of minced meat, traditionally there are two varieties: søt hakkemat (sweet minced food) is usually flavored with onion, syrup and seasoned with ginger, allspice and pepper. This is eaten with potatoes or bread, preferably for lunch or supper. Salt hakkemat (Salty minced food) is flavored with brown sauce, onion, salt and seasoned with ginger, allspice and pepper. This minced food is very similar to lungemos, but it contains more meat. Salty mince is good for dinner, since it is eaten with potatoes, but it can also be cooked.
- Hakkasteik – a meat dish originating from Hardanger, made using ground meat from pork, veal and mutton, mixed with boiled barley groats. In some cases, venison can be used.
- Hjortesteik – venison is a festive food, especially in autumn. Often served as a tender roast of venison with homemade mashed potatoes, fried mushrooms and cranberry sauce.

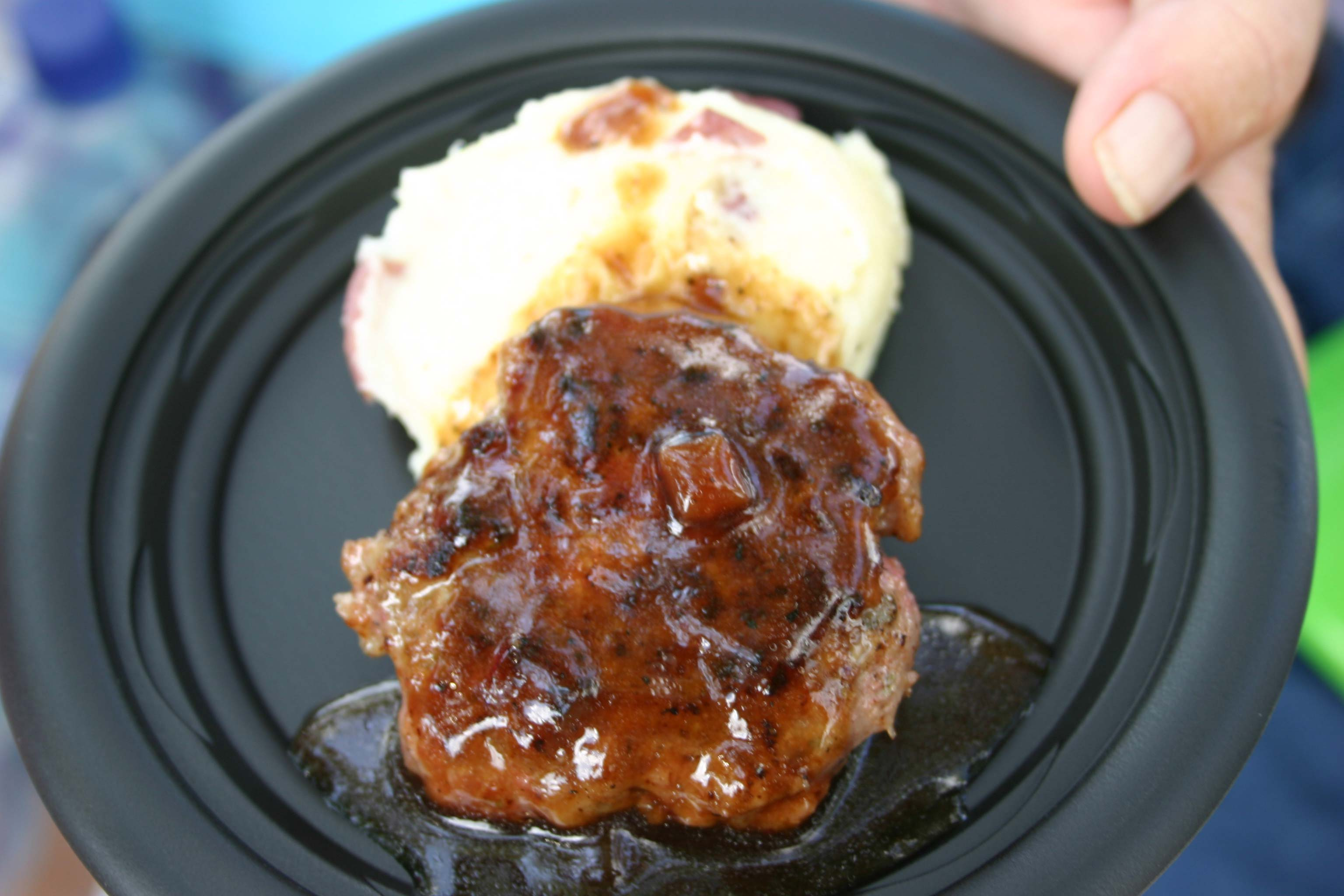
Kjøttkaker with mashed potatoes

- Karbonade – a traditional dish made from clean-cut beef or veal that is coarsely ground into a patty dough, shaped into cakes and fried in butter in a pan.
  - Karbonadedeig – minced meat consisting of ground, clean-cut beef. Used for making karbonade.
- Kjøttbolle – smaller rounder meatballs, often served with brun saus, mashed potatoes and lingonberry jam.
- Kjøttkake – large meat patties of ground beef, onion, salt, and pepper—generally served with brun saus. Potatoes, peas, carrots and cabbage in cream sauce are typically served on the side. Lingonberry jam is a common relish.
- Lammestek – roasted lamb meat, typically served around Easter and during the lamb season in autumn, but preferably at other times of the year as well.

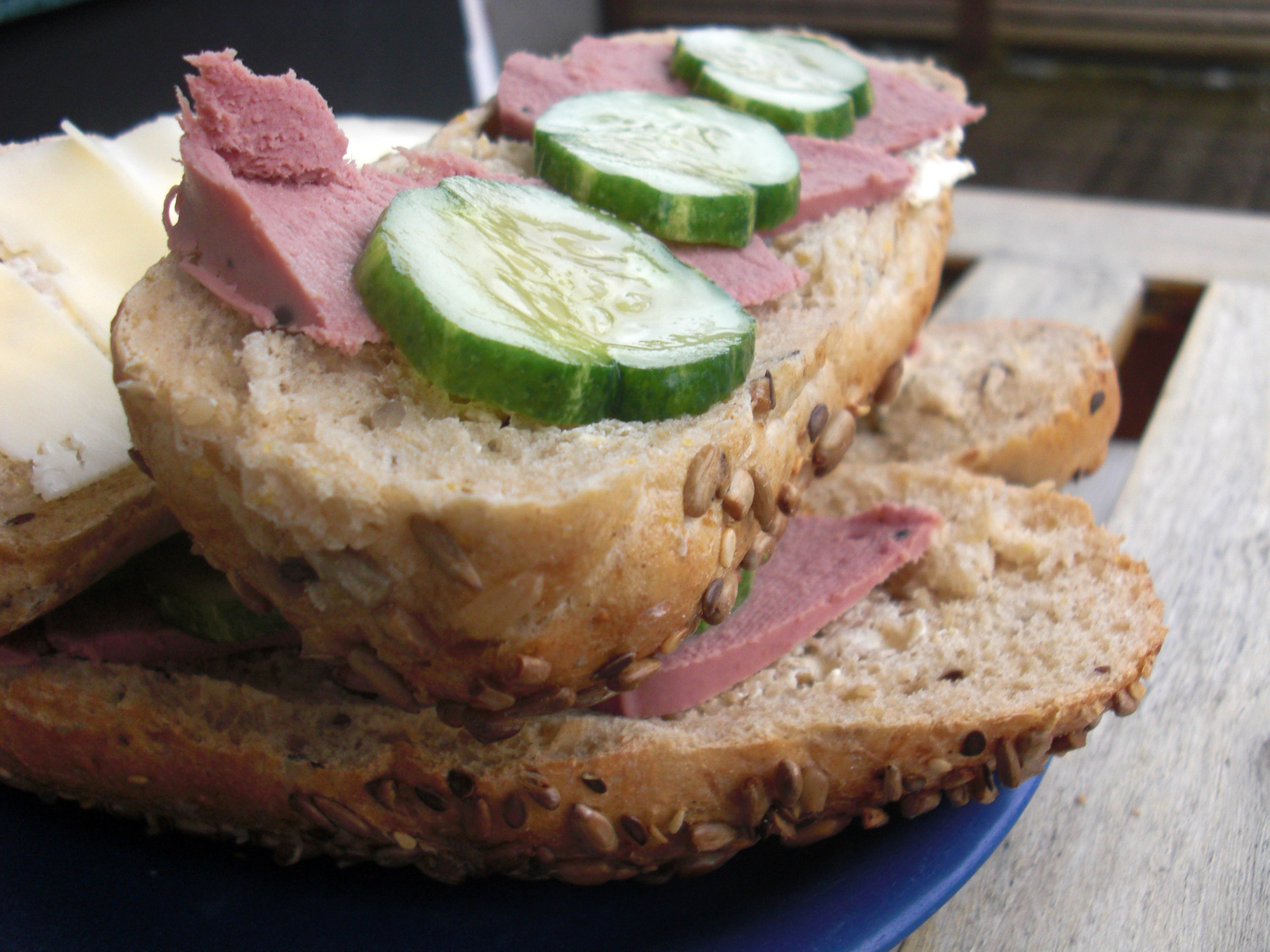
Bread with leverpostei and cucumber

- Lapskaus – a thick Norwegian stew made of meat and potatoes, often with vegetables (such as carrots, onions, leeks, celery root, and rutabaga) and spices (such as salt, pepper, ginger, and herbs).
  - Brun lapskaus (Brown lapskaus) – made from better quality beef (bog, flat or round beef) with onions, potatoes and spices was thought to be a slightly "finer" variant, in a thick stew.
  - Lys lapskaus (Light lapskaus) – served with much cheaper meat (cut-off meat, side breast and belly meat), with pork or without meat at all, as well as vegetables and potatoes in a clear broth.
- Leverkake – meat patties of beef, pork or reindeer, mixed with liver of said animals and spices.
- Leverpostei – a pâté and meat spread made from finely or coarsely ground pork liver and lard, and a bit of pork meat.
- Lungemos – a meat dish, made from minced or ground offal. The dish is traditionally made from lungs, heart and meat from pig's head, as well as onions. It is seasoned with ginger, cloves, allspice and nutmeg.
- Løvbiff – a thin, fried cut of meat consisting of either pressed, ground meat or a whole piece of meat that has been pounded flat. The product is often sold as fast food in fast food restaurants, normally with fries and salad.

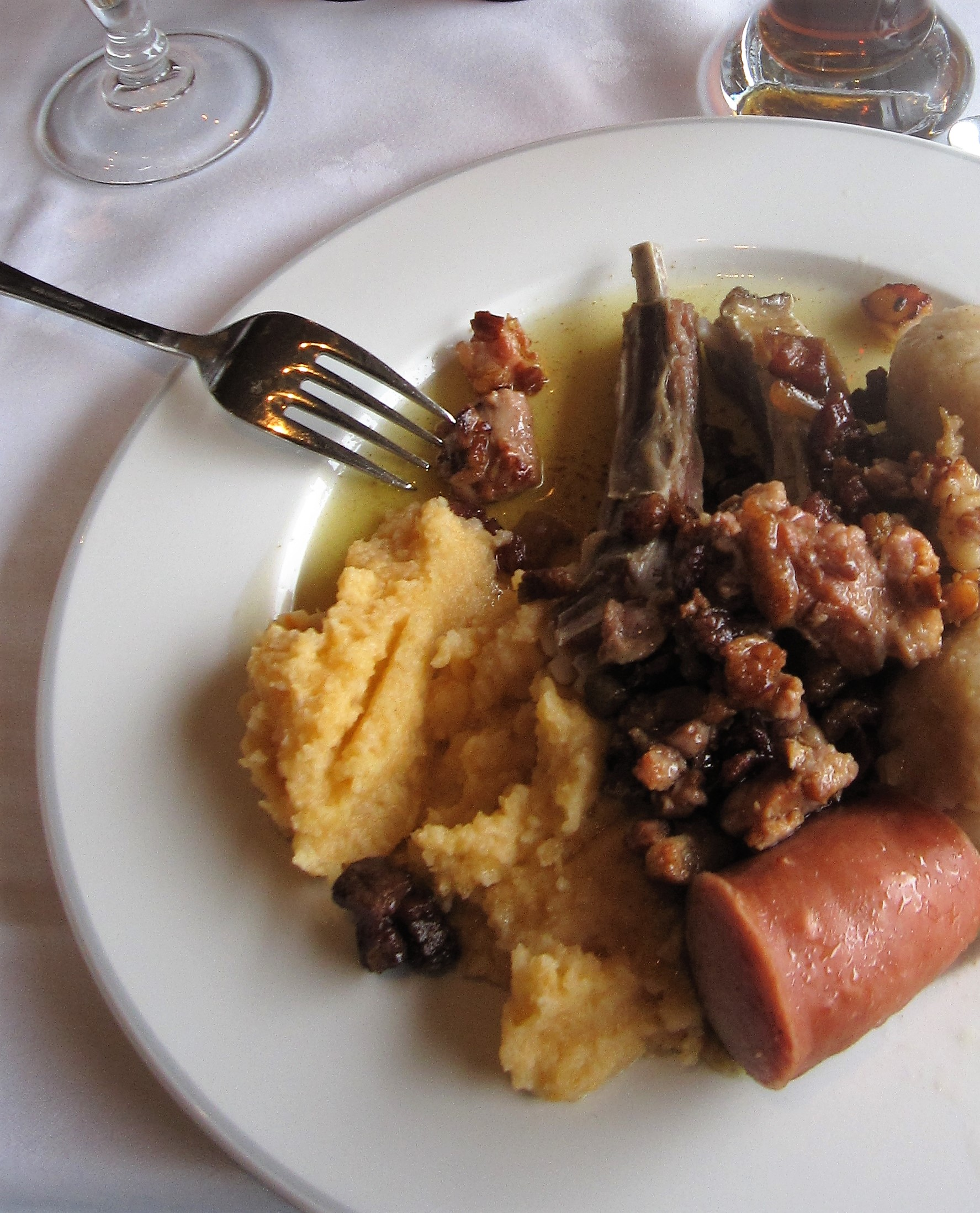
A Christmas meal with pinnekjøtt, sausages and puréed swede

- Majel – a hearty stew containing mutton, vegetables and barley.
- Medisterkake – pork meatballs similar to kjøttkake, typically associated with Christmas cooking.
- Medisterpølse – sausages made from lard and pork meat, also eaten around Christmastime in Norway.
- Morrpølse – a black or red cured sausage which is probably one of the oldest refined food products in Norway. Originally the name was applied to sausages made from offal, but today it is usually made mainly from mutton. Meat from pigs, cattle, horses or game is also used.
- Nepespa – a traditional Christmas dinner from Setesdal, served with smoked cooked lamb or freshly cooked mountain trout – in addition to boiled turnips and fresh lefse, some also serve boiled potatoes.
- Oksetunge – a cut of beef made of the tongue of a cow, eaten around Christmastime.
- Pinnekjøtt (Stick meat) – a festive dish of lamb steamed in a pot over sticks typical to Western Norway. The dish is largely associated with the celebration of Christmas and frequently paired with puréed rutabaga, sausages and potatoes, served with beer and akevitt.
- Puspas – a stew with a special connection to the city of Bergen. The dish is often referred to as Bergen's extended version of fårikål. In addition to mutton and cabbage, the dish contains carrot, turnip and often other vegetables. Whole pepper is often used in the dish, in the same way as we know from fårikål.
- Pytt-i-panne – a culinary dish consisting of chopped meat, potatoes, and onions fried, similar to a hash. Traditionally consisting of potatoes, onions, and any kind of chopped or minced meat such as sausage, ham or meatballs, diced and then pan fried, it is often served with a fried egg, pickled beetroot slices, sour pickled gherkin slices, capers and sometimes ketchup or brown sauce.

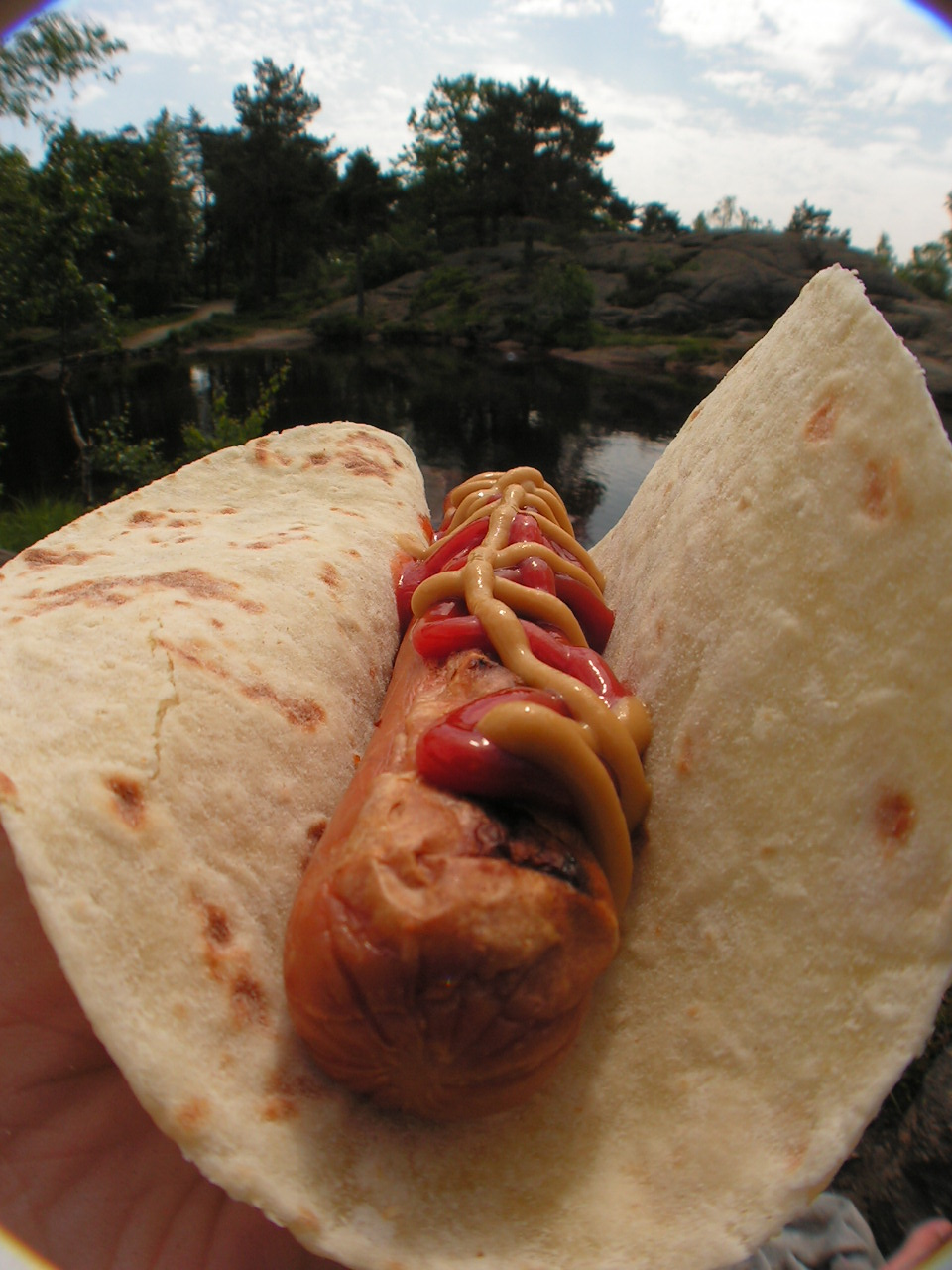
A typical Norwegian hot dog: sausage in a lompe, with ketchup and mustard

- Pølse i brød – a dish composed of a sausage inside a loaf of bread. It is common to eat hot dogs during large gatherings, at birthdays and during the national day. The most common sausages to put in bread are grilled sausage and boiled Wiener sausage. They can be grilled, boiled, steamed, baked, fried or heated on a fire. Variations of sausage in bread are baked sausage and sausage in bread sticks. Common sausage garnishes in Norway are raw or fried onions, ketchup, mustard, potato salad, prawn salad, cheese, sliced side meat and more.
  - Pølse i lompe – a kind of Norwegian fast food consisting of a sausage in a lompe, popular during children's birthdays, Saint John's Eve, and on the Constitution Day. Often served with raw onion, crispy-fried onion, ketchup, mustard, potato salad, shrimp salad, cheese, or bacon.
  - Pølse i vaffel – a traditional food from Moss in Østfold. The dish consists of a wiener sausage in a folded or rolled waffle, often topped with ketchup, mustard, or sometimes jam.
- Reinsdyrkjøttbolle – meatballs made from a mixture of meat from cow, reindeer, lamb, and pork rind, served with mashed potatoes in very thick gravy. The gravy includes brunost or goat milk.
- Saltkjøtt – meat or fish preserved or cured with salt. Often served with puréed swede, potatoes and vegetables.
  - Saltfiskball – a dinner dish consisting of salt-cured fish, with potatoes, onion, flour and salty pork meat.
- Sekkjepose – an old dish from Vistdal, made with potatoes and meat from sheep. In earlier times, mincemeat was used, i.e. offal from sheep that was finely chopped, salted and dried into flat "cakes". Today, many people use minced meat instead.
- Setedalssuppe – a traditional food from Setesdal. The main ingredient is dried, smoked mutton, in addition to various vegetables. It is common to have yellow peas and barley groats. Used on various occasions such as the 17th May (Constitution Day) and village events. It is an important part of Setesdal's tradition and identity.
- Sluring – a simple dish of smoked pork (bacon), white flour and milk. The dish is served with boiled potatoes and flatbrød.

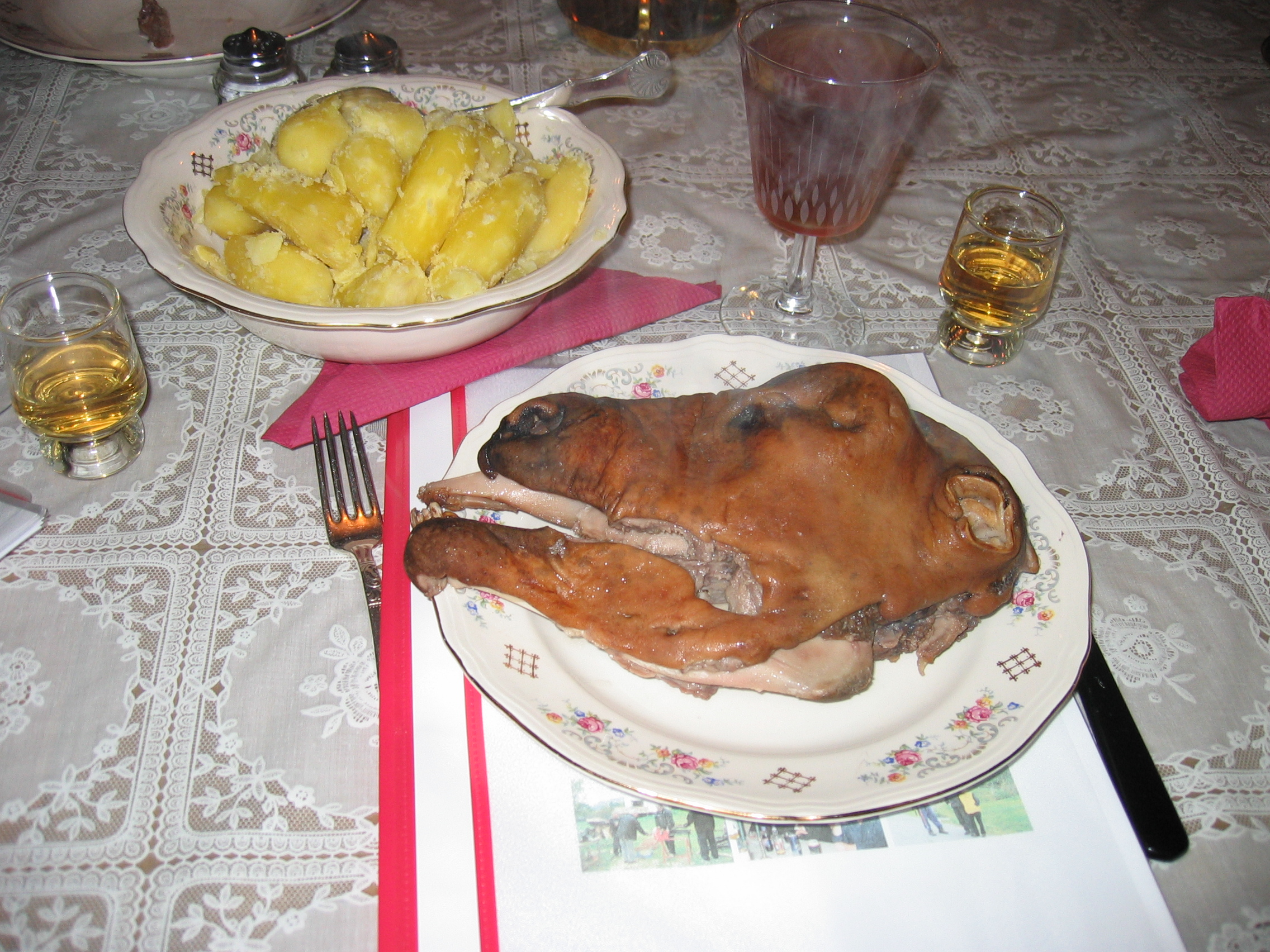
Sheep's head, burned (to remove the hairs), salted, smoked and cooked

- Smalahove – a Western Norwegian traditional dish made from a sheep's head, originally eaten before Christmas. The head is boiled or steamed for about three hours and served with mashed rutabaga and potatoes. It is also traditionally served with akevitt.
- Sodd – a traditional Norwegian soup made with cooked mutton and meatballs made with lamb or beef. Potatoes and carrots are included in a clear, fragrant broth.
- Sosekjøtt – a hearty and tasty stew with beef or high back of beef. The meat stew is served with boiled or salt-baked potatoes, and cranberries.

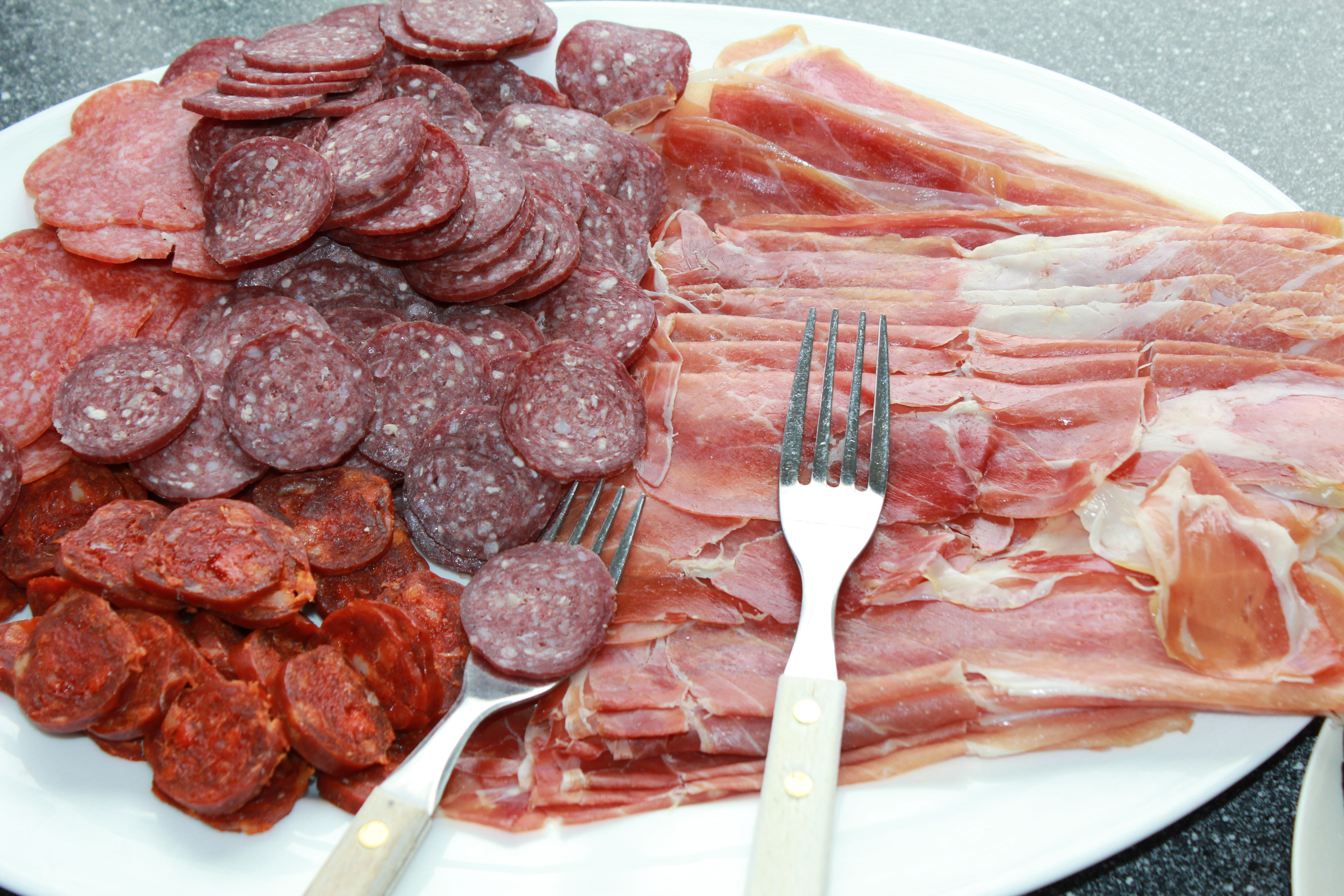
An assortment of spekemat

- Spekemat – a common term for food preserved through curing. Different types of meat and fish can be cured. Examples of cured meats are fenalår, cured ham, cured meat, cured sausage and cured fish.
  - Spekefisk – fish preserved through curing. Different types of fish can be cured, such as herring, mackerel and salmon. Salmon is cured in much the same way as gravlaks, but the process takes longer and it is common to hang it to dry for a couple of weeks. Cured fish is often also smoked.
  - Summer sausage – a number of sausages that have been preserved through salting (curing) or smoking and drying. Cured sausages are made from chopped or ground, cleanly cut meat and fat to which various flavors are added, through the addition of spices, herbs, alcohol and the like. In some types, blood and offal are also used as ingredients.
- Stekte pølser – fresh sausages are fried and served with vegetables, potatoes, peas and perhaps some gravy.
- Stekt flesk og duppe (Roast pork and melted fat dip) – a traditional dish, with lightly salted pork flank steak, which is sliced, but cured pork and bacon are also used. Roast pork can consist of sliced lightly salted side pork or cured pork (which is cooked out) and is fried and served together with boiled potatoes, sjy, kohlrabi sauce, tomato beans or duppe. The duppe is made from skimmed milk and can be added with onions and other spices and herbs. Løtendupp, for example, uses shallots, while tjømedupp is based on chives.

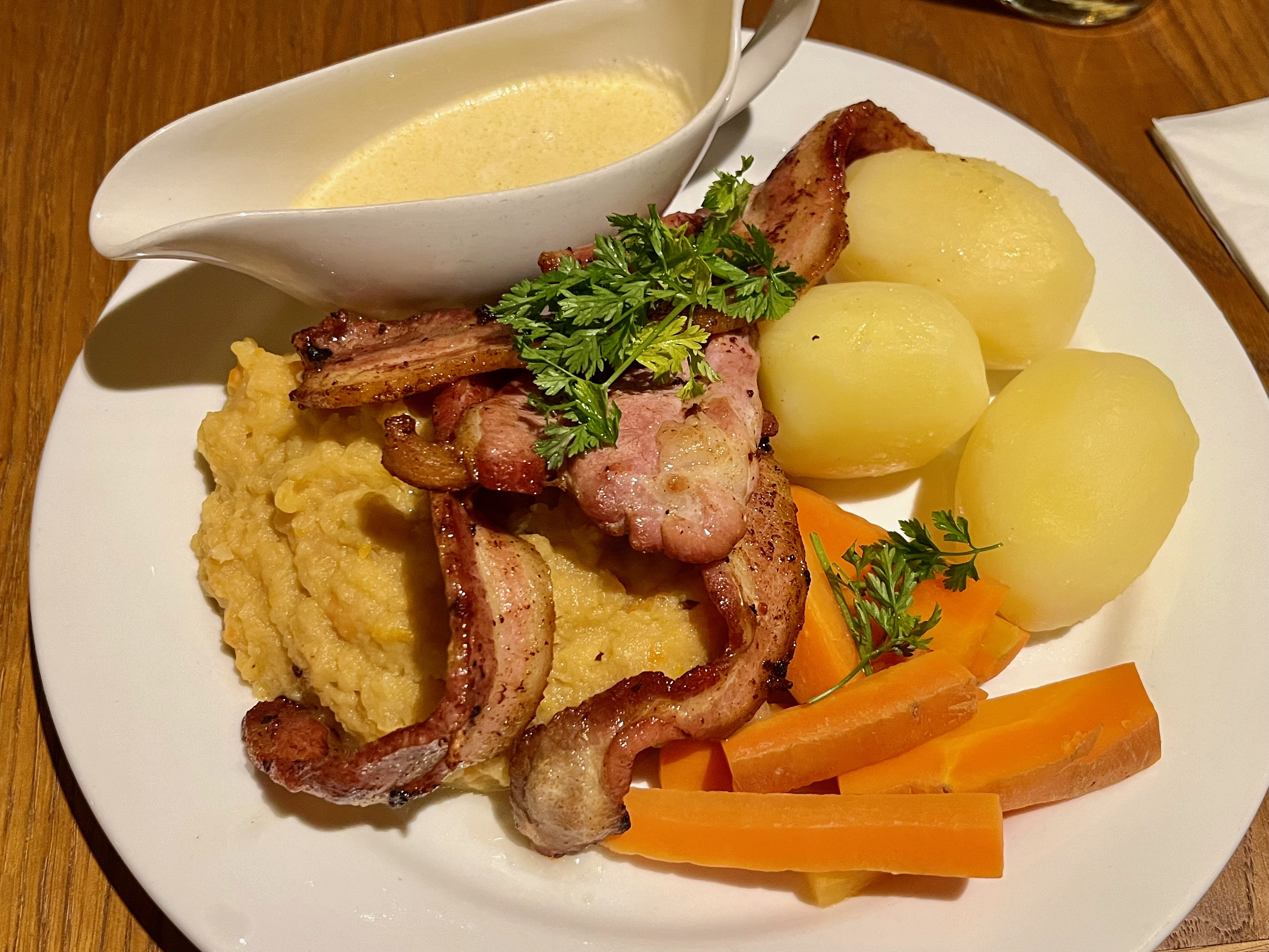
Stekt flesk og duppe, with potatoes and sauce

- Supanesoppa – A delicacy from Voss, made with meat, pork, sausage and milk.
- Sursteik – roast meat that has been brined with sour milk or vinegar before roasting, often served in confirmations, weddings and around Christmas.
- Svinekam – cuts of pork loin roasted and served with potatoes and vegetables.
- Svinekotelett – braised pork chops and served with potatoes and fried onions and whatever vegetables are available.
- Svineribbe – a traditional Christmas dish, with roasted pork ribs which are often served with sweet and sour side dishes, including surkål, red cabbage or Brussels sprouts. Other important accompaniments can be medisterpølse and medisterkake, sausages, lingonberry jam, fried apple slices, prunes and potatoes. Perhaps the most important of all is the sauce, which can be anything from a pure sauce from the rib fat to a smooth sauce with flavorings such as juniper or lingonberries, red wine or goat's cheese. It is common to drink akevitt with the meat.

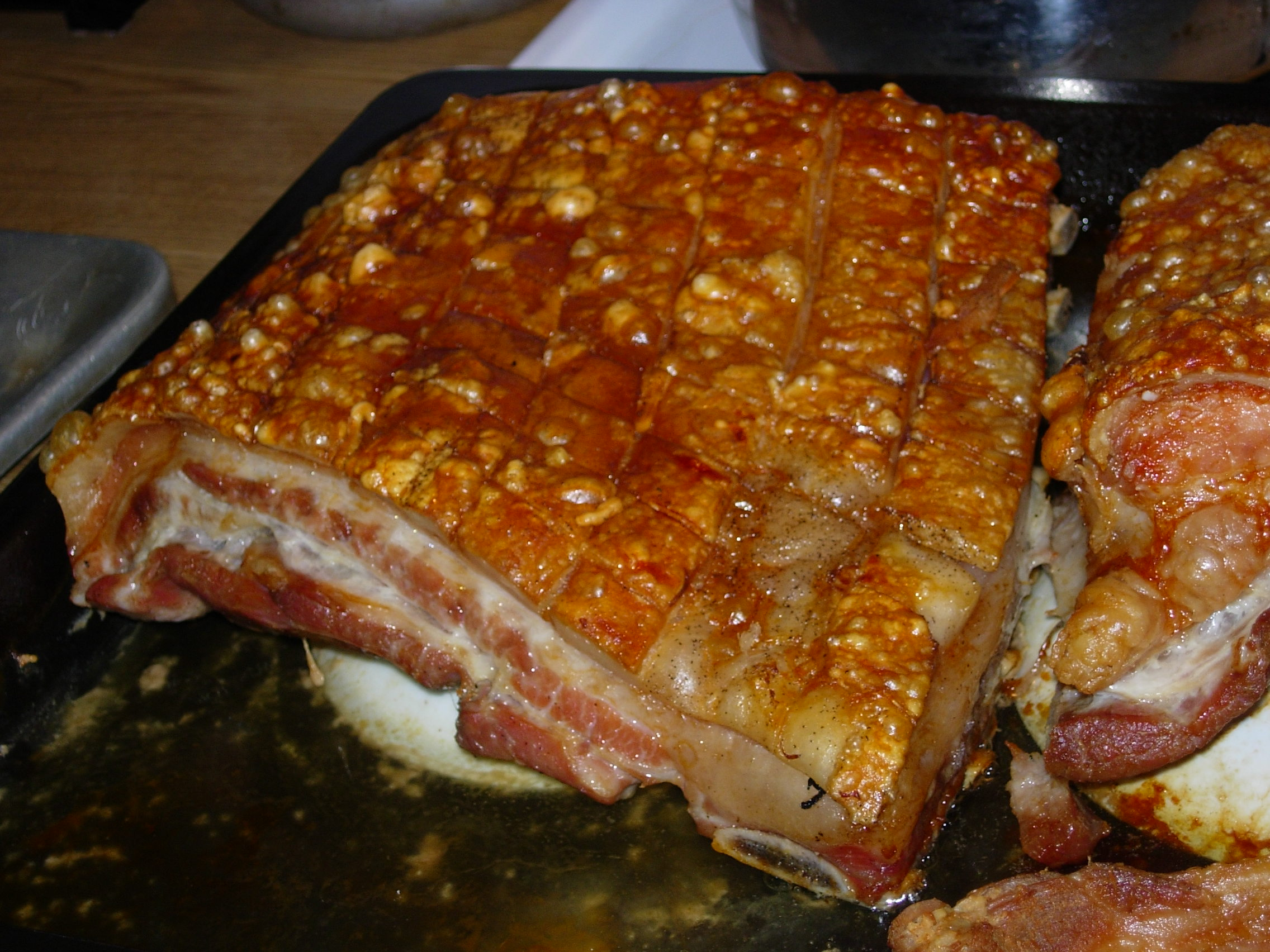
Svineribbe prepared for Christmas

- Svinemør – a traditional type of coarse sausage usually made from minced pork, lard, salt, spices and onions. It is most common in Sunnmøre, where it is most often used as a side dish for Christmas food such as skewered meat or ribs.
- Svinesteik Roast pork – a typical Sunday dinner, served with pickled cabbage, gravy, vegetables, and potatoes.
- Sylte – a traditional Christmas topping of spicy pork in aspic. Pickles are often eaten on a slice of bread or in lefse, and preferably together with coarse mustard.
- Syltelabb – a Norwegian traditional dish, usually eaten around and before Christmas time, made from boiled, salt-cured pig's trotter. They are traditionally eaten using one's fingers, as a snack food, and are sometimes served with beetroot, mustard and fresh bread or with lefse or flatbread.
- Vossakorv – a coarse, spicy and smoked pork, mutton and beef sausage. Traditional food from Voss, eaten with, root vegetables, or as a side dish to hearty dishes such as raspeball and svinekotelett.

=== Fish and seafood ===
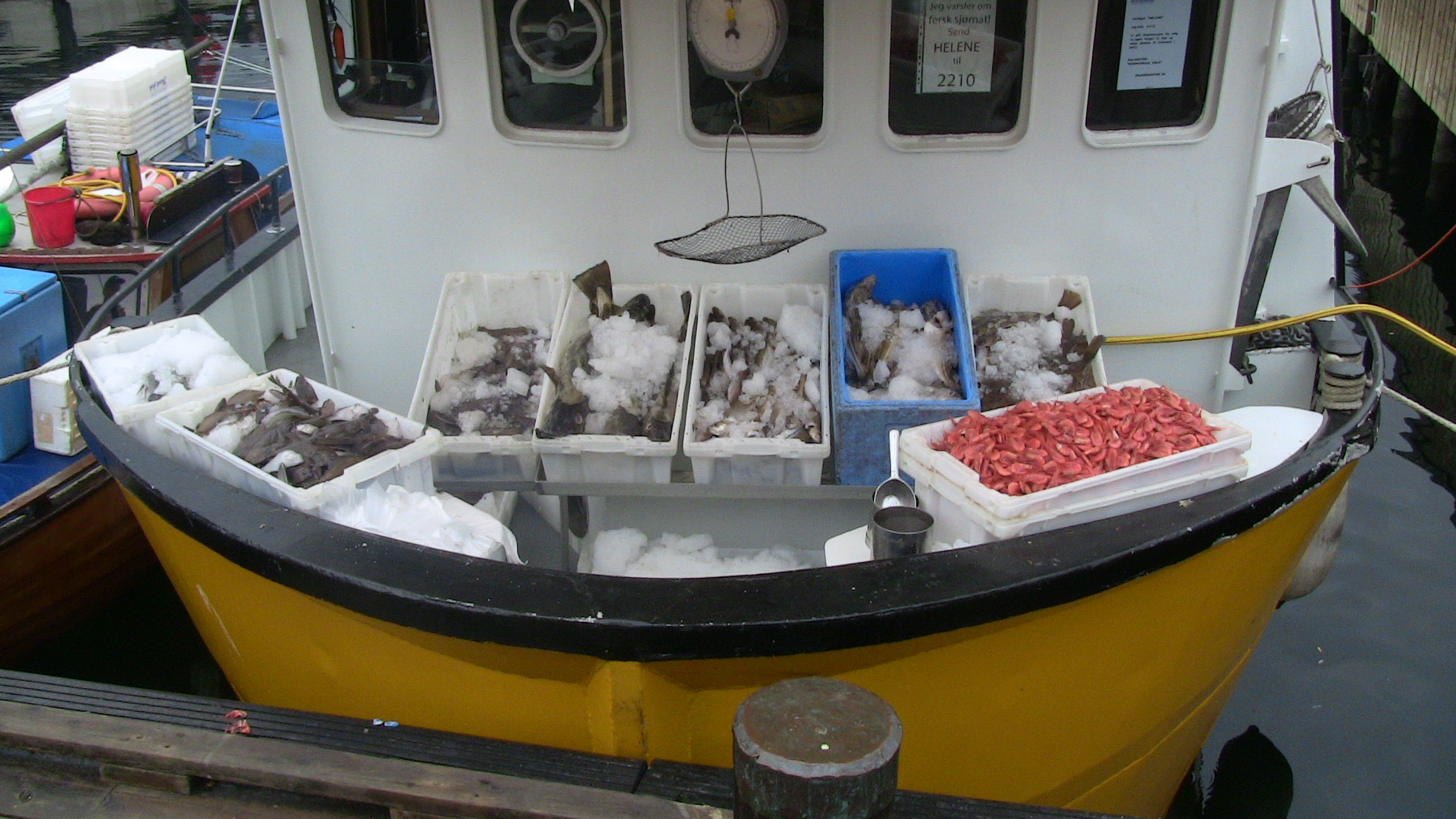
A fish market in Oslo, Norway

- Bøkling – a form of hot-smoked herring cooked for dinner, cold dishes, in salad or as finger food.
- Fishan – Fish and chips. Originally an English food, this dish came to Kristiansund during postwar. Whitefish is dipped in batter and deep fried, served with French fries from Toten and either remoulade or tartar sauce.
- Fiskebolle/blandaball – fish balls made using wheat and potato flour, milk, fish broth, salt and seasonings. When canned, they are packed in fish broth. Haddock is commonly used. They are commonly served with potatoes, carrots or cauliflower or broccoli in a white sauce. The sauce is often made with the stock from the container, sometimes with mild Madras curry seasoning as a condiment, or mixed to create curry sauce. Adding ketchup to the sauce is commonplace among children. Tiny fish balls called suppeboller (literally "soup balls") are also common in fish soup. Sideboller is made from pollock.
- Fiskegrateng – a gratin consisting of fish, macaroni pasta and a white sauce. Baked in the oven with breadcrumbs.
- Fiskekake – fishcakes are fried and served with potatoes or pasta, broccoli and raw grated carrot, and often brown sauce instead of white. The type of fish used vary with availability and recipe: Pollock, haddock, herring, wolf-fish and even salmon or trout are sold, and they are often marketed named after the fish they are made of; Seikaker, Koljekaker, Steinbitkaker, etc. Terms like "burger" is also used; "lakseburger" (salmon burger), "fiskeburger" (fish burger).

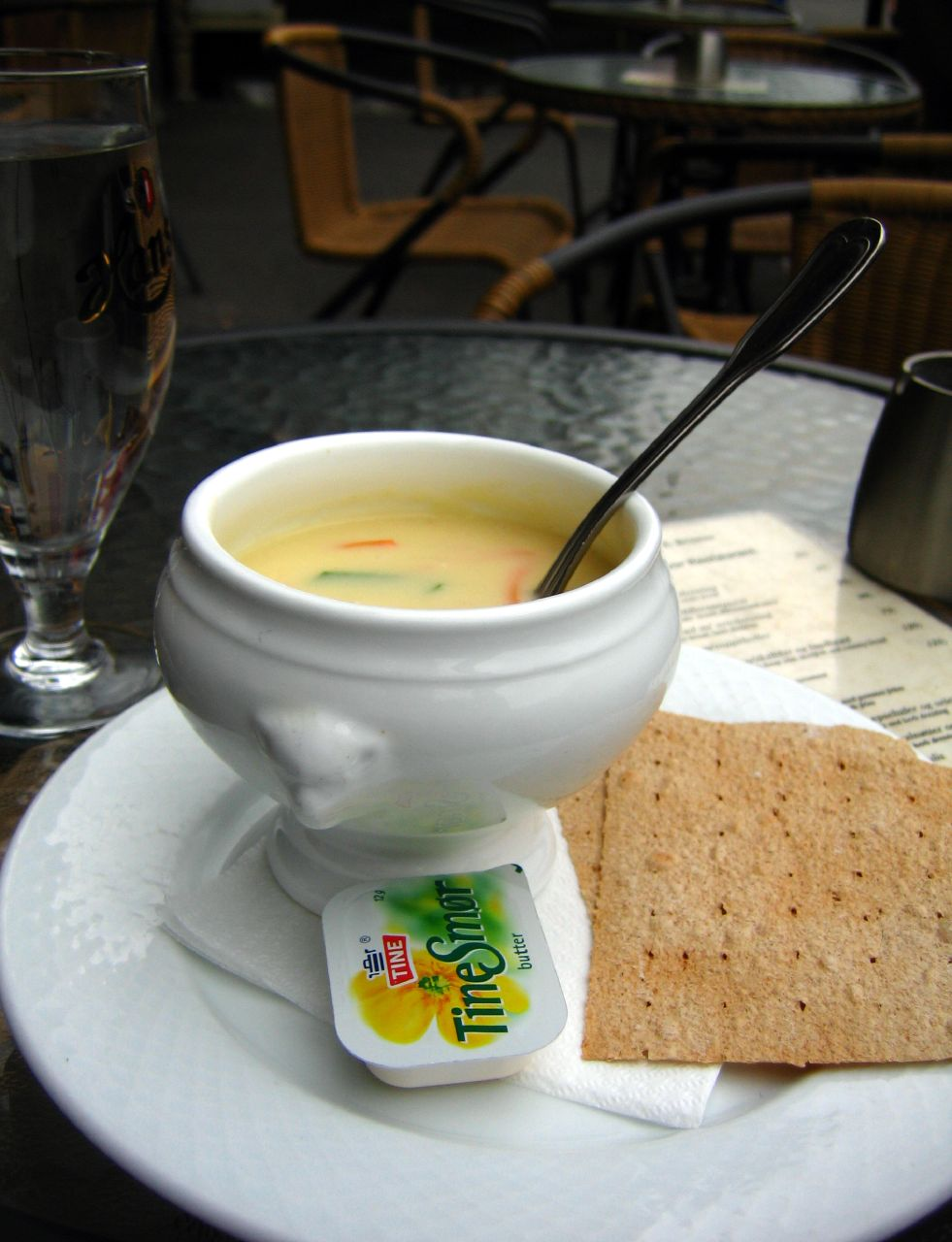
Bergensk fiskesuppe with flatbrød and butter

- Fiskepudding – a fish pudding made primarily from minced fish, with various possible additions such as starch (potato flour, bread, corn flour), milk, spices, preservatives and more. Fish pudding made with cream is often called fløtepudding (cream pudding). Most often, lean white fish is used in production, for example cod, haddock (haddock) or catfish. Served with boiled potatoes, boiled or grated carrot, white sauce, fried onions, prawns and more.
- Fiskesuppe – a white, milk-based fish soup with vegetables, usually carrots, onions, potato and various kinds of fish.
  - Bergensk fiskesuppe (Bergen fish soup) – a heavy, creamed soup made with white fish (haddock, halibut, cod) and various vegetables.
- Palesuppe – a fish soup from Bergen, made with saithe.
- Fleskeball – a traditional dish along the coast of Norway that consists of white fish and a side of ribs.
- Gammelsei – mature salted pollock in barrel. The pollock is fished in the summer months and salted without blogging, and it must have a certain maturation period. Gammelsei has been a well-known part of sea salvage along the coast, but the product has to a lesser extent been marketed beyond the region.
- Gravlaks – a dish consisting of salmon that is cured using a mix of salt and sugar, and either dill or spruce twigs placed on top and may occasionally be cold-smoked afterwards.

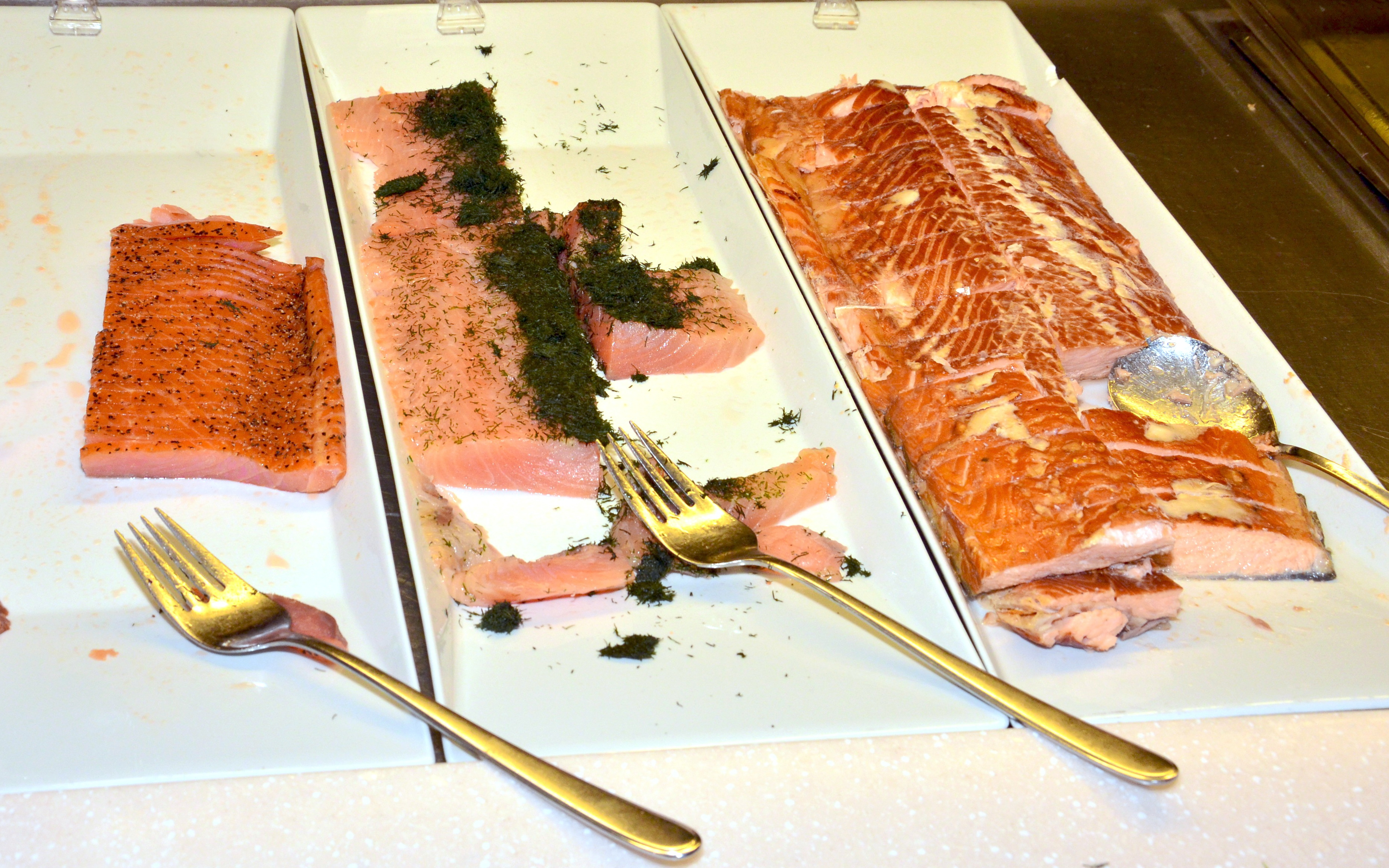
Salmon dishes from left to right: Cold smoked salmon with pepper, cured salmon (gravlaks) with dill and hot smoked salmon

- Grævfisk – a dish similar to rakfisk, but it is matured in whey, and becomes a little milder. It is often served with potetlefse, potato and leeks.
- Hvalkjøtt – Whale meat can be used in many ways but is often cooked in a pot with lid in a little water so that broth was created and then served with potatoes and vegetables, often with flatbrød on the side.
- Kams – a dish made from cod liver and flour. The liver mince can be prepared with various ingredients, for example milk, boiled potatoes, onions and spices.
- Kaviar – a fish roe spread in the form of a paste made from cod roe and a variable mix of other ingredients, which can include potato flakes, tomato sauce, onion, salt and sometimes dill or chives. It is usually sold in smoked and non-smoked variants, as well as in variants with a prominent taste of dill.
- Klippfisk – cod which has been preserved by drying after salting.
- Lutefisk – dried whitefish (normally cod, but ling and burbot are also used). It is made from aged stockfish (air-dried whitefish), or dried and salted cod, cured in lye. It is gelatinous in texture and prepared as a seafood dish traditionally during the Christmas feast; Norwegian julebord. Lutefisk is traditionally served with boiled potatoes, mashed green peas, melted butter and small pieces of fried bacon.
- Makrell i tomat Mackerel in tomato sauce – a spread consisting of pieces of mackerel fish and tomato sauce.
- Mølje or fiskemølje – a dish consisting of poached fish, roe, and liver, from Northern Norway. A meat version called kjøttmølje, based on broth (most often from pork) and flatbread.

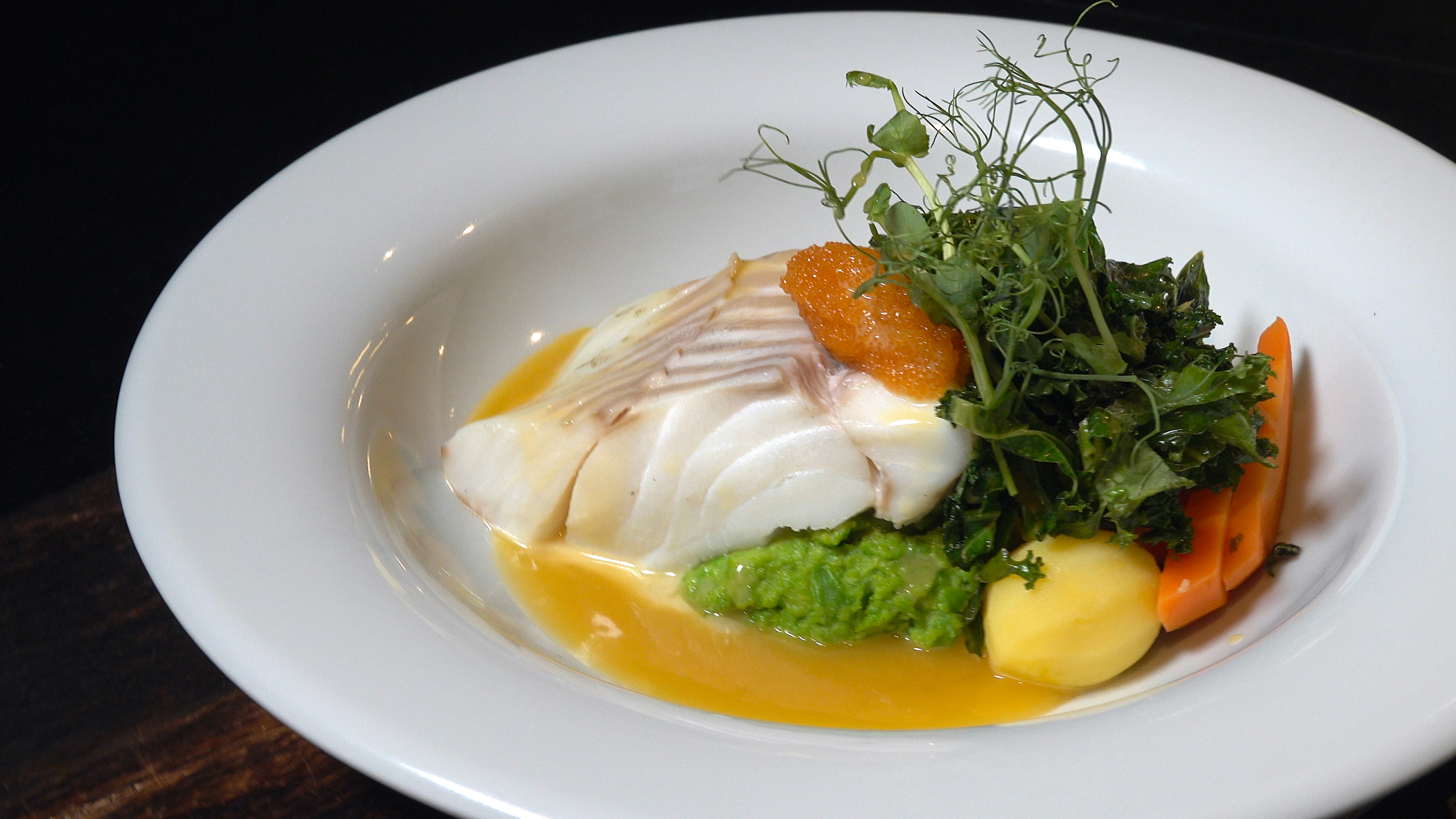
Persetorsk served with potatoes, vegetables and salad

- Persetorsk – is traditional food from Bergen, made from fresh fillets of cod with the skin on. The fillets are sugared and salted and put under pressure over time in a cool place. The combination of sugar and salt makes the fish firmer and slices into fine flakes, at the same time it gives the fish a round taste that is completely unique to the dish.
- Plukkfisk – a dish consisting of small pieces of fish, diced potatoes and onions cooked in white sauce.
- Prinsefisk – a dish of cod served in cream sauce. The main ingredient is cod fillet pieces that have been steamed beforehand. These are placed in a white sauce with added cream and crayfish tails (or prawns), preferably with some of the liquid they have secreted. Common accompaniments besides potatoes are carrots.
- Raket rogn – a delicacy made from fish roe. The roe is preserved in a fermentation process and turns into a kind of caviar. Several types of fish can be used, including freshwater fish.
- Rakfisk – a fish dish made from trout or char, salted and autolyzed for two to three months, or even up to a year. Rakfisk is then eaten without cooking and has a strong smell and a pungent salty flavor.
- Rognbakels – a type of waffle where the batter contains cod roe. Rognbakels is a traditional Norwegian dish from Nordmøre.
- Rognpannekake – a type of pancake made with roe, usually from cod, stemming from Møre og Romsdal.
- Røkt fisk – fish that has been cured by smoking. Salmon is a species of fish that is particularly suitable for smoking, often by cold smoking, but other fish species are also suitable, preferably by hot smoking, such as whitefish, herring, trout and mackerel.
  - Røkt laks – a preparation of salmon, typically a fillet that has been cured and hot or cold smoked.
- Sildegryn – a traditional one-pot dish with cured herring. The dish is cooked with groat soup, with potatoes, carrots, turnips, onions and cabbage. The herring grits can be flavored with thyme, parsley, pepper and salt.
- Spekesild – Atlantic herring preserved using salt. A traditional Norwegian dish with salted herring (spekesild) is served with boiled potatoes, raw onions, dill, pickled beetroots, butter or creme freche and flatbrød.
- Stekt fisk – braised fish, the larger specimens tend to be poached and the smaller braised. The fish is filleted, dusted with flour, salt and pepper and braised in butter. Potatoes are served on the side, and the butter from the pan used as a sauce or food cream is added to the butter to make a creamy sauce.

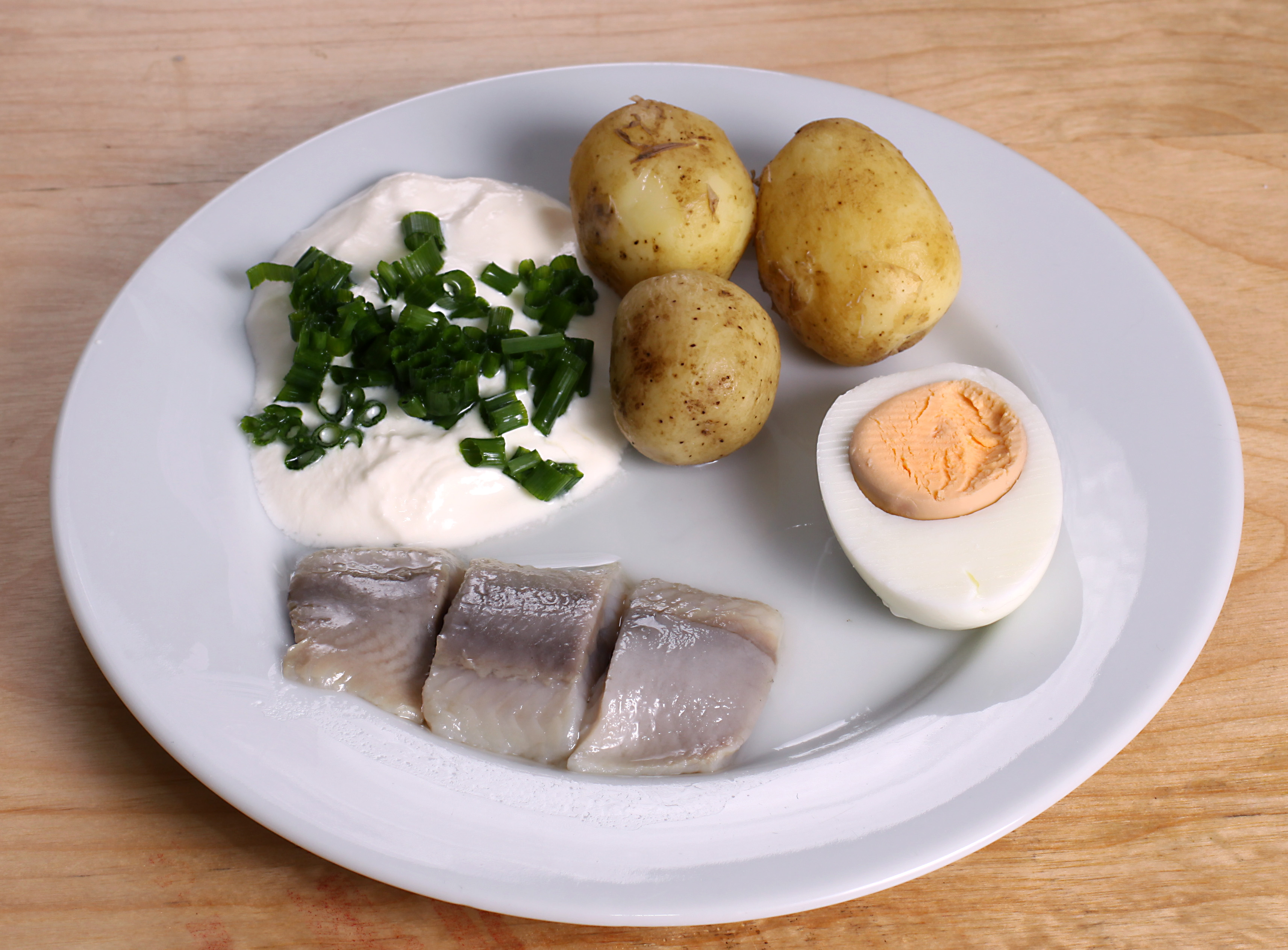
Sursild with sourcream and chopped chives, potatoes and half an egg

- Sursild – a traditional dish consisting of cured herring, onions and spices that are placed in a brine. It is used either as a snack, dinner or as a topping on a slice of bread.
- Tomatsild – pickled tomato herring, made with tomato paste, sugar, and vinegar, flavoured with black pepper and bay leaf. Salt-cured herring is rinsed, cut in 1 cm thick slices and a raw, sliced onion added.
- Torsk – cod fish; often poached, simply served with boiled potatoes and melted butter, while carrots, fried bacon, roe and cod liver may also accompany the fish. A delicacy which is somewhat popular in Norway is torsketunge, or cod's tongue.
- Tørrfisk – unsalted fish, especially cod, dried by cold air and wind on wooden racks (which are called "hjell" in Norway) on the foreshore.
  - Boknafisk – a variant of stockfish and is unsalted fish partially dried by sun and wind on drying flakes ('hjell') or on a wall. The most common fish used for boknafisk is cod, but other types of fish can also be used.
    - Boknasild – a variant of boknafisk, with herring used instead.
  - Lubbesild – a term for a variant of the salted and dried herring from South-West Norway, mainly in Sunnhordland and the surrounding area.

=== Grain, soup, vegetable and other dishes ===
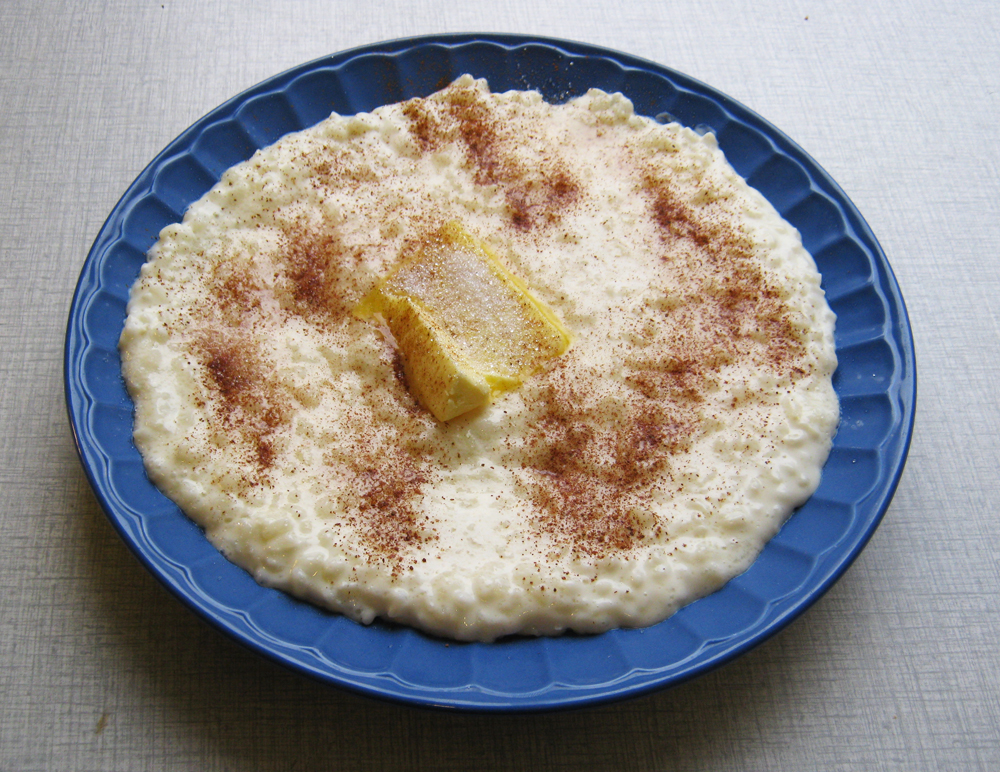
Risengrynsgrøt served with sugar, cinnamon and butter

- Blandsmør – a dish that consists of curd from soured milk, mixed with sour cream, butter or both. It is often eaten on flat bread or with potatoes.
- Blodpannekake – blood pancakes made of whipped blood (typically reindeer blood), water, flour and eggs. They may be fried in a frying pan, and are usually served with crushed lingonberries or lingonberry jam, sometimes with pork or reindeer meat.
- Dylle – a milk dish with rice that in some places is used as a celebration food, often as a dessert. It is served cold, preferably with cinnamon and sugar, either as a main course or as a dessert. Dylle can also be served with waffles or lefse.
- Ertesuppe – pea soup traditionally served at springtime and Easter, and is complemented with potatoes, carrots and vegetables.
- Fersk suppe – a traditional dinner dish. The soup often contains beef in addition to vegetables such as potatoes, carrots, cabbage, celery and others.
- Fruktsuppe – a soup prepared using fruit as a primary ingredient and may be served warm or cold.

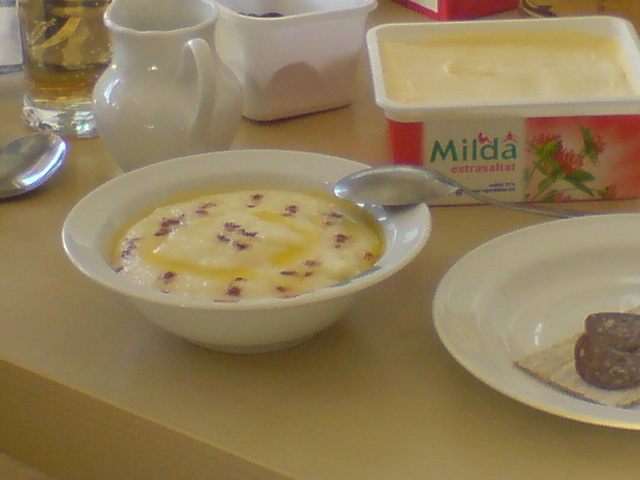
Rømmegrøt served with butter

- Grøt – a food made by heating or boiling ground, crushed or chopped grains, in milk or water. It is often cooked or served with added flavourings such as sugar, honey or (dried) fruit.
  - Byggrynsgrøt – a porridge made with barley, milk and water. Often topped with cinnamon, honey and berries.
  - Fløyelsgrøt or smørgrøt – a porridge made from butter, wheat flour and freshly strained milk. The porridge was considered a "finer" porridge since it was made from sifted wheat flour and milk, not combined flour and water. The porridge is served with sugar, cinnamon and possibly butter. Juice and water are drinks that traditionally are served with the porridge.
  - Havregrøt – oatmeal porridge made from grainy oats. Oatmeal is usually boiled in water or milk. It is also normal to add salt when the oatmeal is cooked. The porridge is most often served hot, but can also be served cold and topped with berries, nuts and sugar.
  - Risengrynsgrøt – a hot dish made from rice and milk, served with butter, sugar and cinnamon around Christmastime.
    - Rislapp – small pancakes made from leftover risengrynsgrøt, served with sour cream and strawberry jam.
  - Rømmegrøt – a porridge made with sour cream, whole milk, wheat flour, butter, and salt. Rømmegrøt is thick and sweet and is generally drizzled in butter and sprinkled with sugar and ground cinnamon. Because this is so rich, it is often served in small cups with a small amount of butter topped with brown sugar, cinnamon and cream. Traditionally, it is eaten with cured meat.
  - Semulegrynsgrøt – semolina porridge made with milk, often topped with sugar and butter before serving.
  - Sunndalsgrøt – a porridge-like sweet dish with butter, cream, milk and sugar. It is favourably served on waffles or in a bowl with butter and cinnamon added on top.
  - Vassgraut – porridge cooked with water instead of milk. Water porridge and flatbread were the two dishes that were historically everyday food in Norway. Until now, porridge in most homes was boiled in water. Water porridge was considered a poor diet compared to porridge cooked in milk.
- Survelling – a traditional dish from Toten, made with barley flour and water.
- Øllebrød – a dish made of wheat flour, milk, beer and sugar.
- Kleppmelk – a dinner dish eaten mostly in Trøndelag and Northern Norway. Kleppmelk is made as a thick pancake batter, which is dissolved in boiling milk. In the soup, light rasp balls cooked in milk are used. Sugar is used as a sprinkle when served.
- Kleppsuppe – a milk soup with long traditions in Norway. There are several recipes for the soup, often with local variations, but it can for example consist of milk with buns (klepp) made of barley flour, eggs and salt, and served with cinnamon.

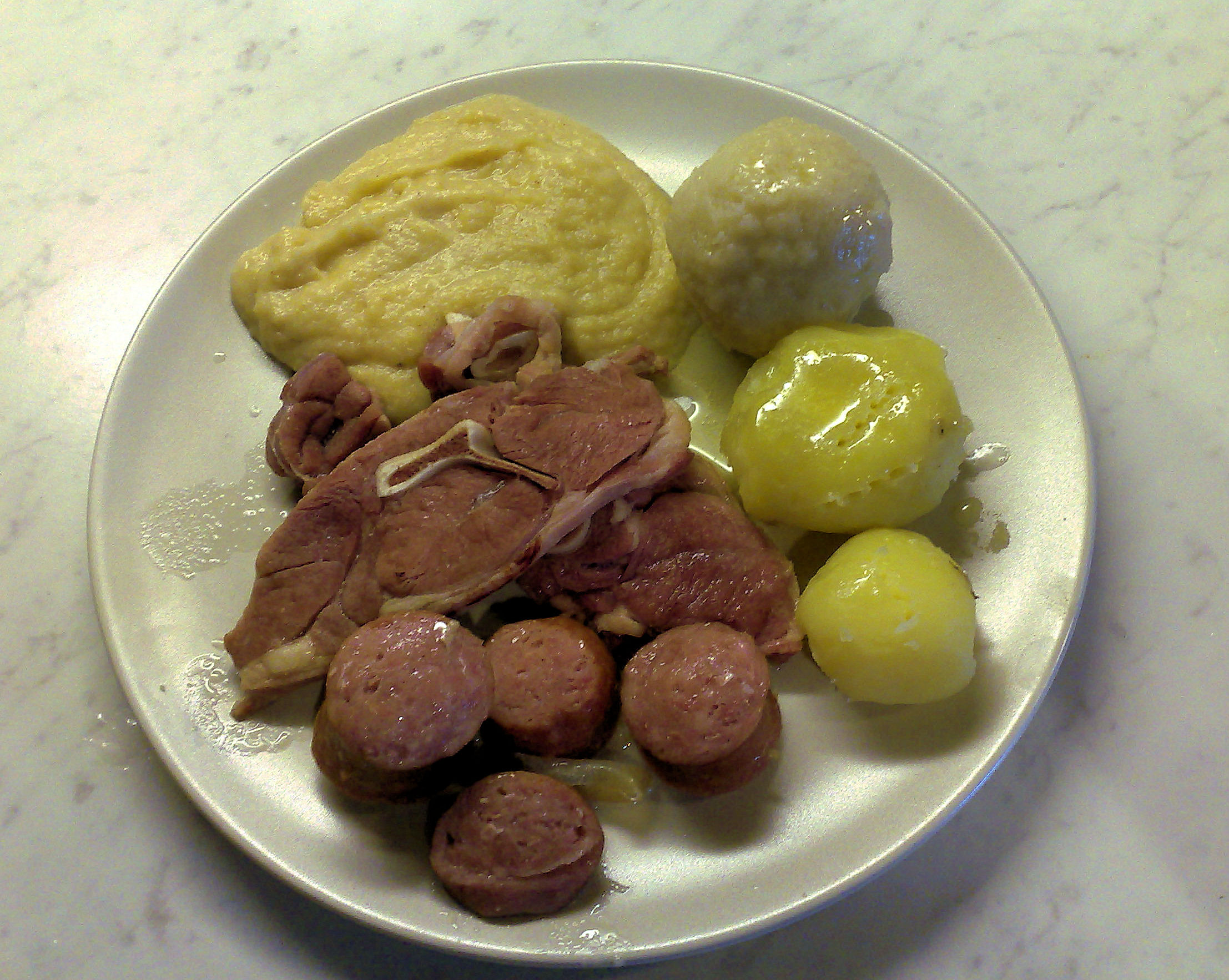
Raspeball served with salty lamb meat, vossakorv, puréed swede and potatoes

- Mackøl og måsegg – a traditional Northern Norwegian seasonal dish, as it depends on fresh eggs from gulls, preferably gray gulls, black-backed gulls, herring gulls or great herons. The eggs are boiled, split lengthwise in half, and often served on flatbread with dairy butter that should melt over the hot eggs. Season to taste, plenty of salt and some pepper is usual. The beer should be served cold, and in a glass bottle, preferably from the northern Norwegian brewery Mack.
- Nevagraut – a porridge consisting of boiled water and salt, with flour, served with pork.
- Potetgrøt – a traditional dish, with potato, flour, water and salt. It is made using a wooden pestle and pound it all together to a slightly chewy consistency. It must be pounded well so that there are no lumps of milk. Some varieties are with fried pork or cold cultured milk over the porridge.
- Raspeball – a traditional Norwegian potato dumpling. The main ingredient is peeled potatoes, which are grated or ground up and mixed with flour, usually barley or wheat. They may include salted and boiled pork or lamb meat, bacon, sausages, melted butter, boiled carrots, mashed or cooked rutabaga, sour cream, kefir or soured milk, cured meat, brown cheese sauce and even boiled potatoes.
  - Blandaball – a variety of raspeball is the fiskeball or blandaball, where minced fish, fresh or salted, is added to the potato dough.
- Soll – a simple dish consisting of flatbrød, dry bread or kavring that have been broken or crumbled into pieces and completely cold, sweet or sour milk on top. Soll can also be sweetened with jam, berries, fruit or sugar. The dish is served in a deep plate or bowl and eaten with a spoon.
  - Flatbrødsoll – a traditional dish where thick milk is served with pieces of flatbrød. Varmsoll is a breakfast variant using hot milk. The dish is often sprinkled with sugar.
- Trondheimssuppe – a sweet and sour soup from Trøndelag. Soup contains rice grains and raisins. Otherwise, it contains water, sour milk and sugar, as well as wheat flour for thickening. Other ingredients may vary, e.g. cinnamon, prunes and juice.
- Velling – a Norwegian gruel dish consisting of some types of grain – such as ground oats, wheat or rye – heated or cooked in water or milk. It is thinner than porridge and can more often be drunk rather than eaten and does not need to be heated.

=== Dairy dishes ===
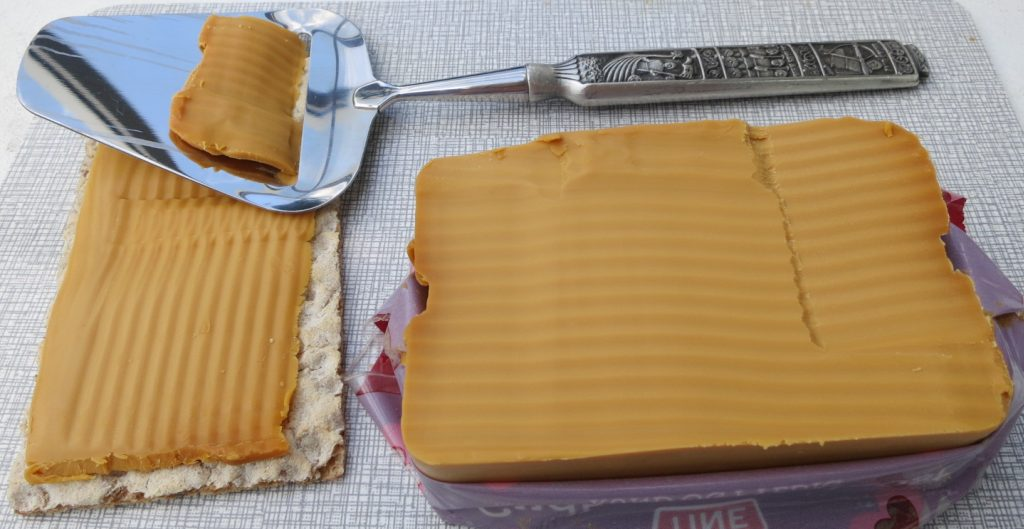
Brunost on crispbread with a cheese-slicer

- Brunost – a caramelized brown Norwegian whey cheese. Brunost (brown cheese) is commonly used instead of mysost (whey cheese). It is regarded as one of Norway's most iconic foodstuffs and is considered an important part of Norwegian gastronomical and cultural identity and heritage.
  - Fløtemysost – a type of brunost or brown cheese made from cow's milk.
  - Gudbrandsdalsost – a type of brunost consisting of goat milk added to fløtemysost.
  - Geitost – cheese made from whey, milk and cream from goat.
    - Ekte geitost ("true goat cheese") – goat cheese containing only goat milk and whey.
  - Heidalsost – a dark brown brunost from Heidal with a decorative pattern molded on the cheese block.
  - Misværost – Misværost is a goat cheese that is browned very little, it therefore has a light, almost yellow color, and a very mild taste.
  - Primost – a slightly brown cheese made from cow's milk which has a soft spreadable texture.

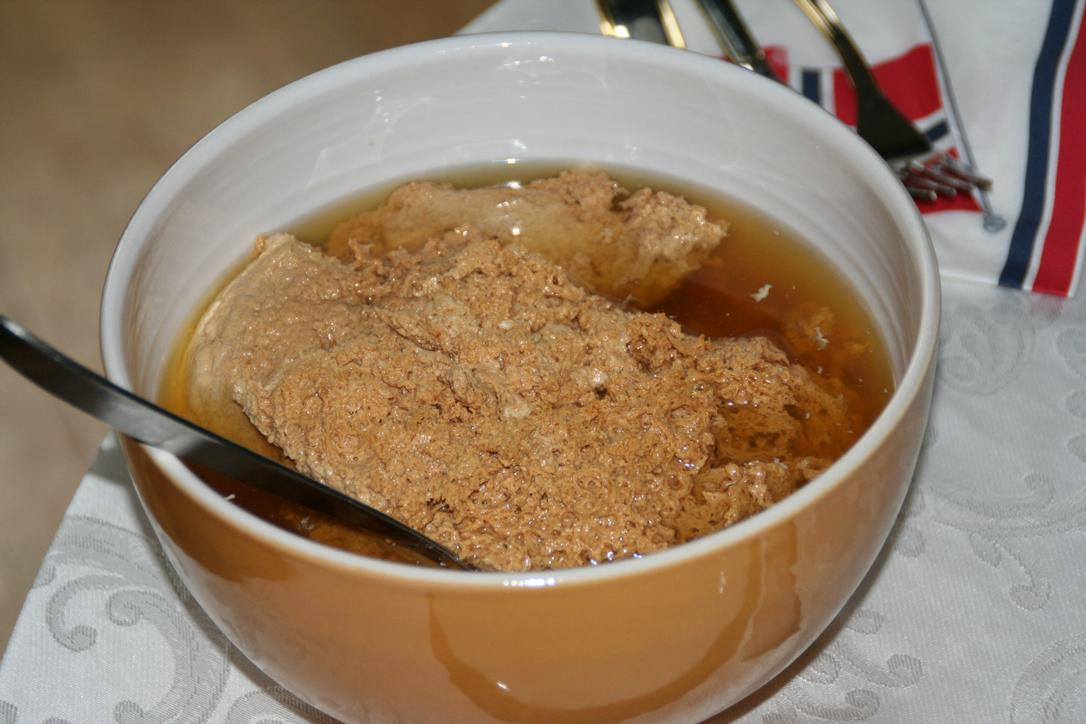
Gomme in a bowl

- Dravle – a dish prepared from milk that is boiled in a pot and "exploded" with skimmed milk or sour milk, and the curd then forms larger and smaller lumps in a sauce of whey. Some milk or whey is taken out, while the rest is further cooked together with the curd. Eggs, sugar, cream or sour cream and cinnamon are included as flavoring in some recipes. Dravle is usually eaten from the dessert or soup plate, as a party food with cured meat or as a pure dessert.
- Fatost – a cheese made from skimmed milk, acidified and heated and then matured. The cheese is not pressed, and no run is used in the cheese making of barrel cheese. This type of cheese originally comes from Jæren and is not common today.
- Gamalost – a traditional cheese made from skimmed cow's milk.

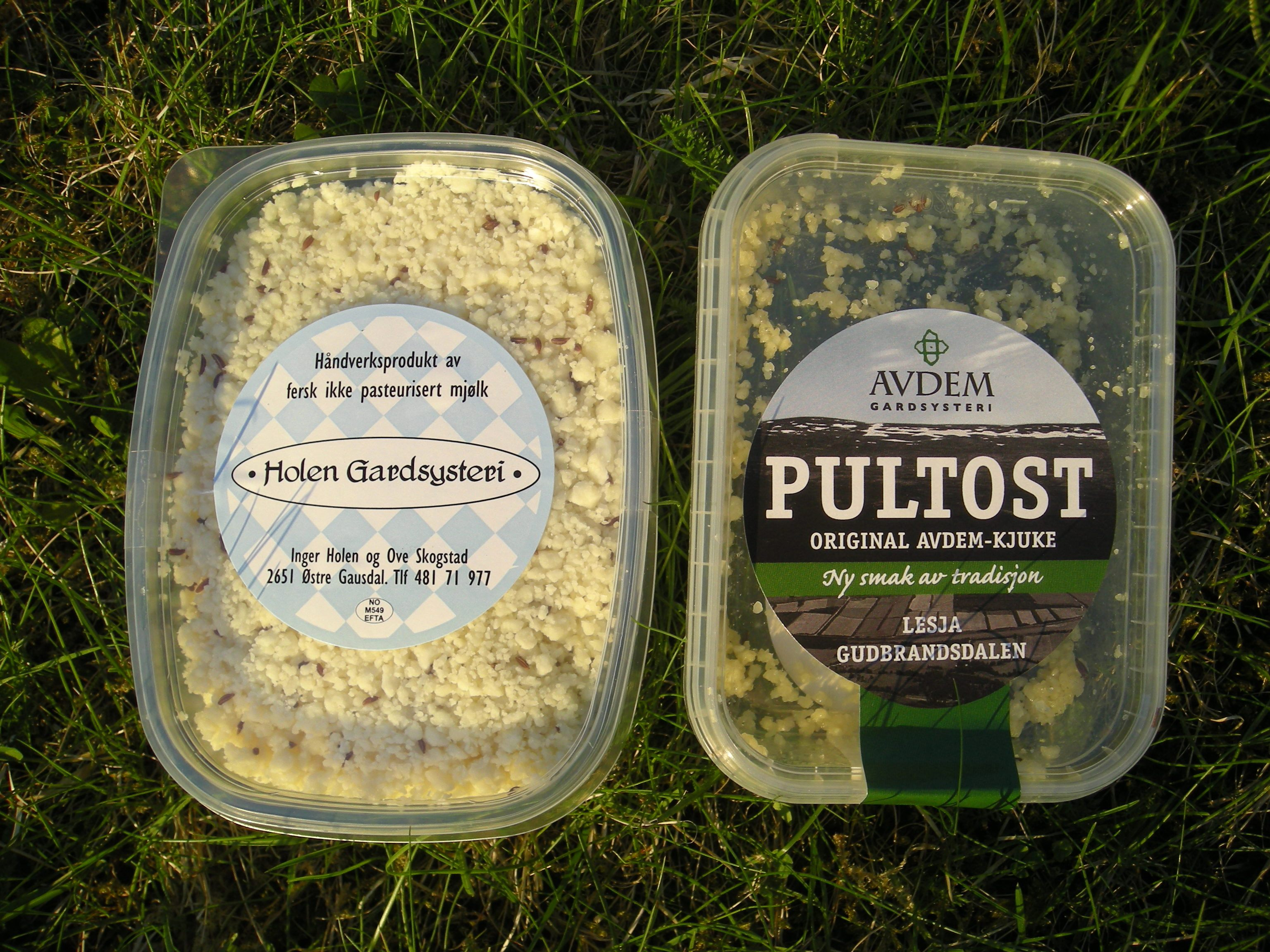
Pultost from a farm

- Gomme – a traditional dish usually served as a spread or a dessert, a form of sweet cheese made of long-boiled milk and having a yellow or brown colour. It is used as a cheese spread on slices of bread, lefse, or waffles. There also exists a porridge-like variant made of boiled milk with oat grain or rice. It can be served as a dessert with vanilla, cardamom, raisins, and cinnamon as added ingredients in most variants. The consistency can vary from soft to thick.
- Haglette – an old type of feast food made of milk. It was most often used in connection with celebrations such as Christmas, weddings and funerals.
- Nøkkelost – a traditional cheese flavored with cumin and cloves.
- Pultost – a soft, mature sour milk cheese flavored with caraway seeds.
- Rømme – Norwegian sour cream made from cream or a mixture of whole milk and cream that has been soured. The sour cream is acidified with the help of a bacterial culture, either natural or with added lactic acid culture. Sour cream has a thick consistency and a sour smell, widely used as an ingredient in dishes, and is also used by some in pancakes and waffles.
- Rømmekolle / Melkeringe – an acidified milk product eaten as a dessert or a snack. It is eaten plain or served with kavring or flatbrød and possibly sugar and cinnamon.
- Skjørost – a fresh curd cheese made from sour skimmed milk. The cheese is made by acidifying skimmed milk, and after 17–18 hours it is gently heated until the milk "cracks". The soft cheese is traditionally served with condensed milk, sour cream and possibly a little sugar, usually as an accompaniment to cured meats.
- Skyr – a cultured dairy product, with the consistency of strained yogurt, but a milder flavor. Skyr can be classified as a fresh sour milk cheese, similar to curd cheese.
- Søst – A dairy dish similar to gomme, but added raisins, syrup and semolina. Often added to or eaten with lefse or as a dessert on its own.
- Tettemelk or tjukkmelk – a sour milk type with long traditions in the Nordics. The milk is durable and does not separate in whey and cheese casein.

=== Side dishes and sauces ===
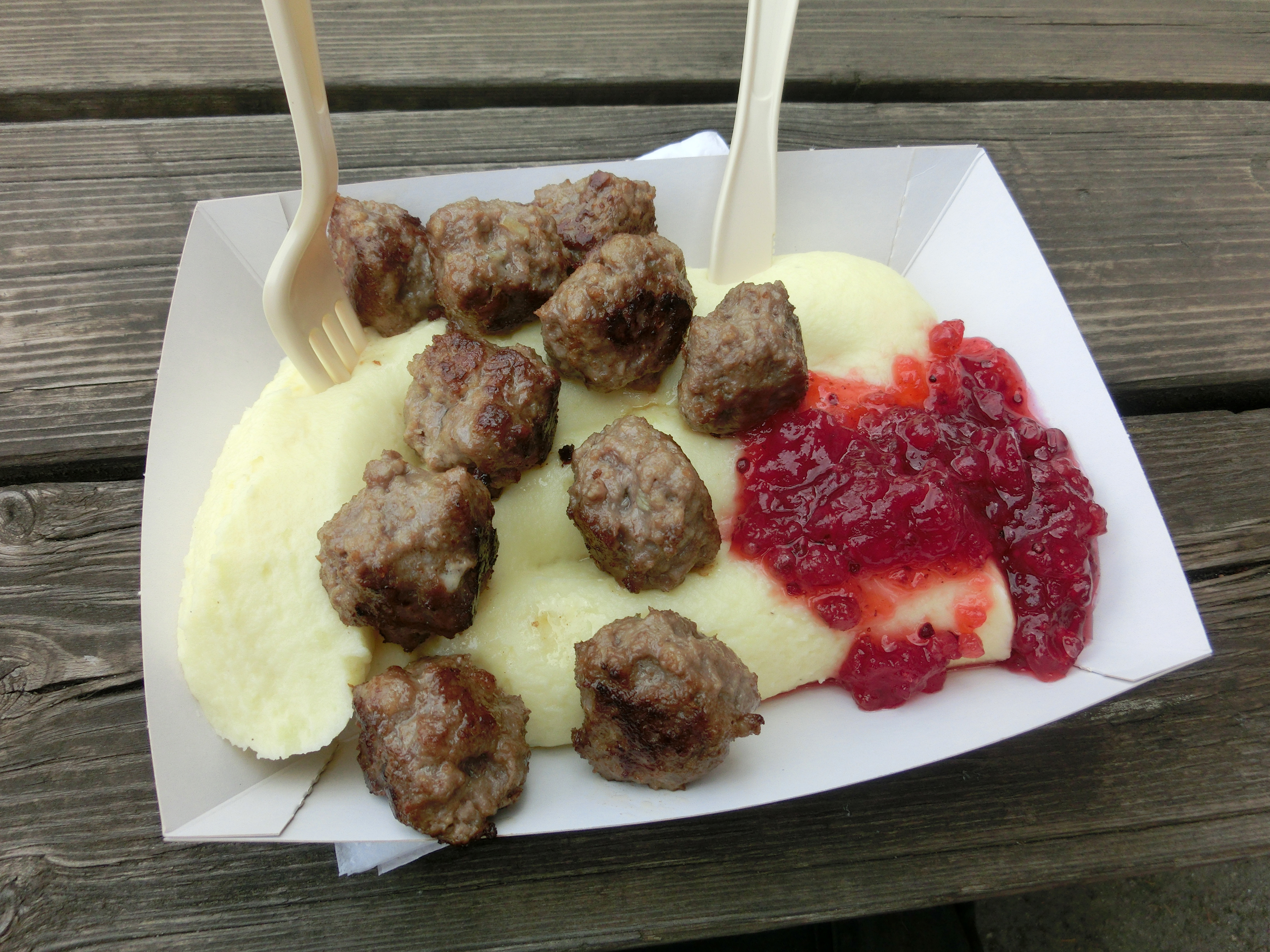
Meatballs with mashed potatoes and lingonberry jam

- Brun saus – a smooth sauce that is made from wheat flour, fat (usually butter or margarine), water, spices and possibly other flavourings. Brun saus is used for various dishes such as pork chops, meatballs and various fried fish or meat.
- Eggerøre – typically served for breakfast or lunch, but a common side dish during a Christmas breakfast table in Norway, with bread, meats and other toppings.
- Italiensk salat – a salad of shredded vegetables in mayonnaise. Some times it is topped with meat. It is mostly used as a topping.
- Kålrabistappe – puréed swede mixed with water, heavy cream, butter, and salt & pepper.
- Potetstappe – mashed potato with added milk, butter, salt and pepper. Usually served as a side dish with meat and vegetables.

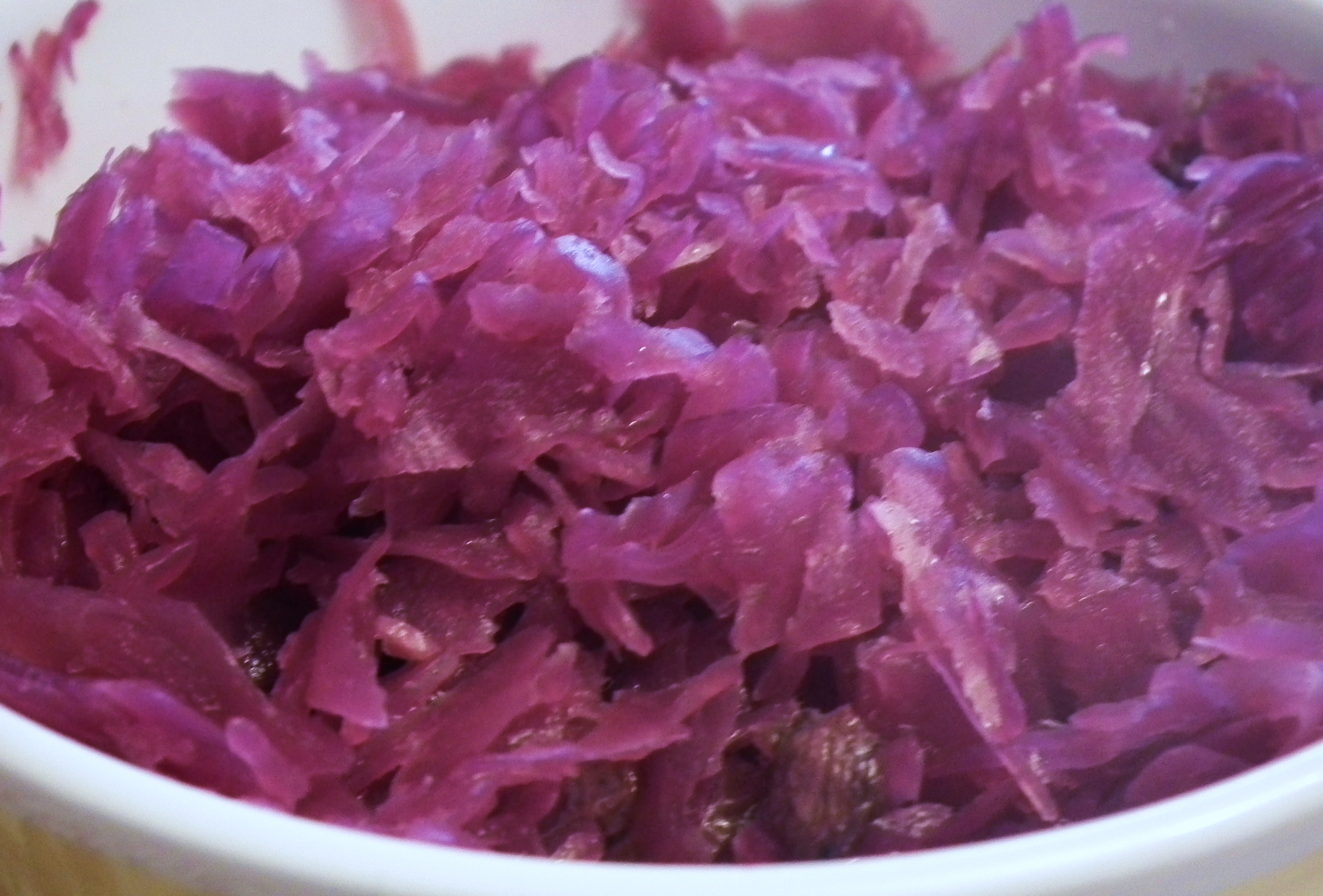
Red cabbage as a side dish

- Rødkål – red cabbage slowly cooked the same way as surkål, served with pork, duck and turkey, and typically with Christmas food.
- Sandefjordsmør – a traditional butter and cream sauce typically served with fish dishes such as salmon, garnished with fresh dill and peppercorn.
- Sprøstekt løk – deep fried onion pieces used as garnish or a side for hot dogs, hamburgers and other dishes.
- Surkål – a traditional side dish where the main ingredient is cabbage. The cabbage is finely sliced and slowly cooked with caraway and cumin seeds, apple, vinegar, sugar, salt and butter. Surkål is usually served together with pork.
- Tyttebærsyltetøy – Lingonberry jam prepared with berries, sugar and a small amount of water. It may be served with meat courses, such as kjøttboller (meatballs), beef stew or liver dishes.
- Vegetables such as potatoes, carrots, peas, rutabaga, cabbage, radish, parsnip, onion, red onion, cauliflower and Brussels sprouts are common sides for meat and fish dishes.

=== Drinks ===
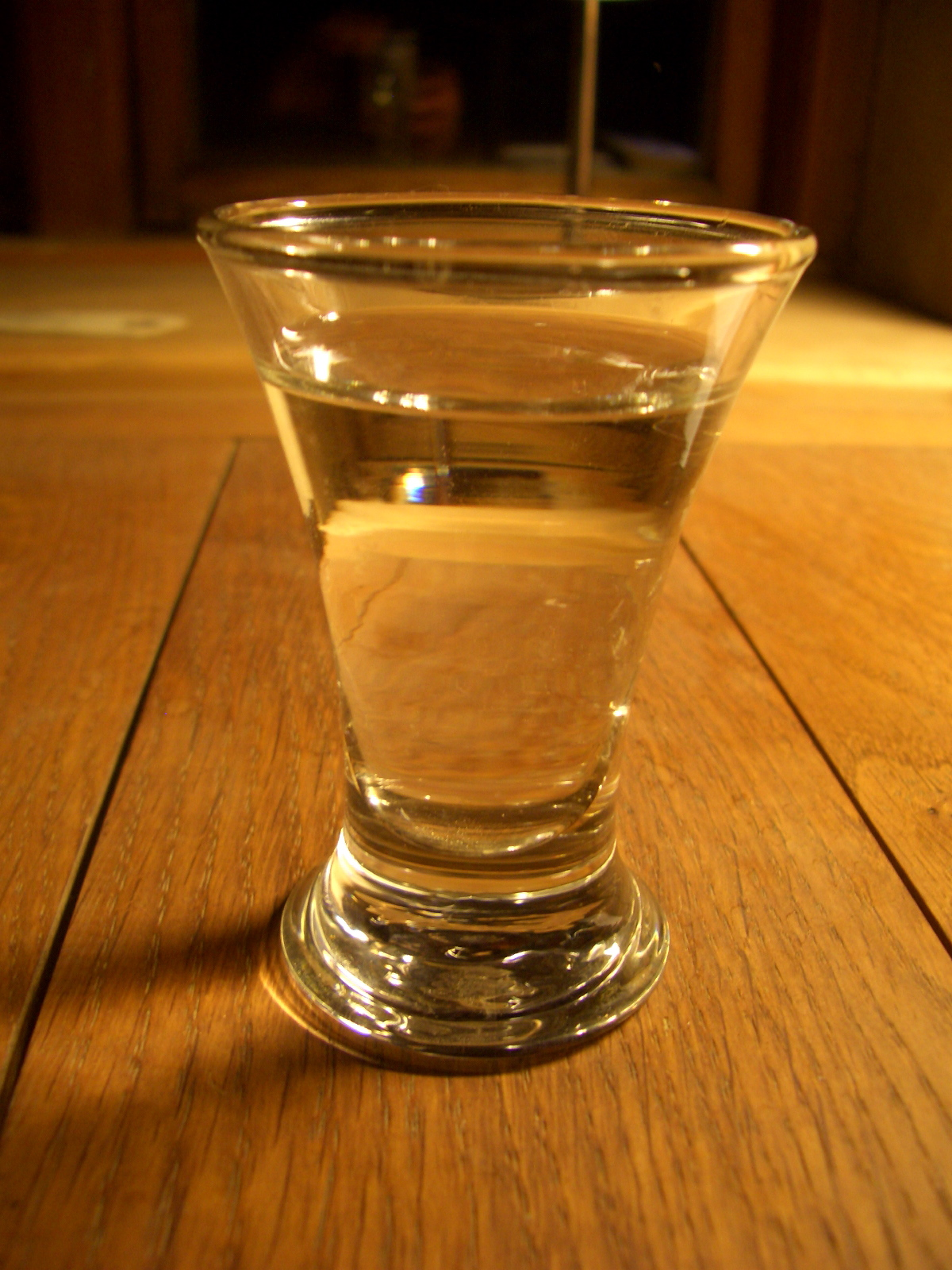
Akevitt schnaps

- Akevitt – a yellow-tinged liquor spiced with caraway seeds, and possibly cardamom, cumin, anise, coriander. Popular around Christmas with a meal.
- Gløgg – a spiced, usually alcoholic, mulled wine or spirit. It is a traditional Nordic drink during winter, especially around Christmas. The most common spices in glögg are cloves, cinnamon, cardamom and ginger. Other common ingredients can include citrus peel from oranges or lemons, raisins, or almonds.
- Hjemmebrent – homemade (and also, illegally) produced Moonshine primarily from potatoes and sugar. An ingredient in karsk.
- Julebrus – a soft drink, brewed by most Norwegian breweries as a Christmas drink for minors, instead of the traditional juleøl (Christmas ale), but is also very popular amongst adults. Julebrus come in a sparkly red color, from strawberry and raspberry, or a pale-brown color, similar to beer, depending on brewery and brand.
- Juleøl – seasonal beer brewed for consumption at Christmas. They are usually strong and spiced with a variety of ingredients including cinnamon, orange peel, cloves and vanilla.
- Karsk – a cocktail from the Trøndelag region containing coffee together with moonshine and sometimes a spoon of sugar.
- Mjød – an alcoholic beverage made by fermenting honey mixed with water, and sometimes with added ingredients such as fruits, spices, grains, or hops.
- Most – freshly crushed fruit juice (usually grape juice) that contains the skins, seeds, and stems of the fruit. Apple must is a very common and popular drink in Norway.

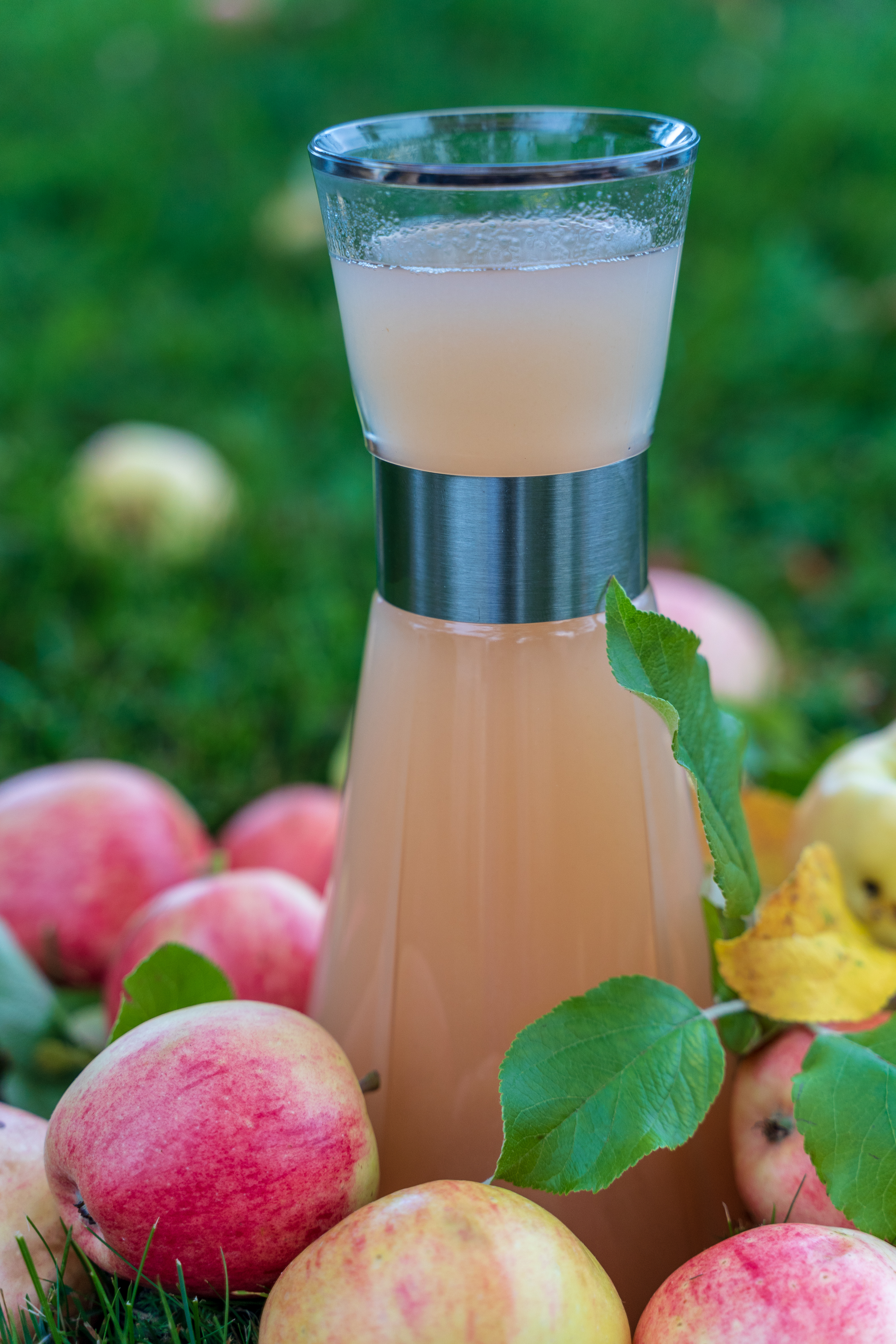
Apple must with fresh apples

- Saft – a beverage with concentrated syrup used in beverage making. It is usually fruit-flavoured, made from fruit juice, water, and sugar or a sugar substitute. A popular flavour in Norway is blackcurrant, and is mixed with water.
- Sukkerøl – a traditional drink from Sogn og Fjordane associated with Christmas time. The beer must be alcohol-free, and has been an alternative for abstainers. The basis is a decoction of juniper, a coniferous tree. As with most local food traditions, there are a number of local variations and preferences.
- Øl (Beer) – beer has a long history in Norway, being produced by the brewing and fermentation of starches, mainly derived from cereal grains, most commonly from malted barley.
  - Kveik – a type of beer made from the kveik yeast, which has been used in Norwegian farmhouse brewing for generations.
  - Vørterøl – a non-alcoholic drink made from water, malt and hops, and then carbonated. In principle, it is beer that has not undergone fermentation.
  - Ølost – a warm drink of fatty milk and beer.

=== Desserts, fruits and cakes ===
- Avletter – a type of thin and crispy cake made from a mixture of water, whipping cream and flour and these days are often fried in distinct iron – or in some places in a slightly thicker version in goro iron.
- Berries and fruits such as strawberries, bilberries, lingonberries, raspberries, rhubarb, plums and apples are popular and used in many desserts or eaten on their own, with cream and sugar.
- Berlinerkrans – a pastry shaped like a ring placed in a loop, served for Christmas. The dough is made from a mixture of raw and boiled egg yolks, sugar, flour and butter, and the berliner wreaths are typically decorated with granulated sugar.
- Bløtkake – a type of layer cake consisting of sukkerbrød, or sugar bread, cream or custard, and fresh fruit. It is typically served in the summer months or around Constitution Day in Norway.

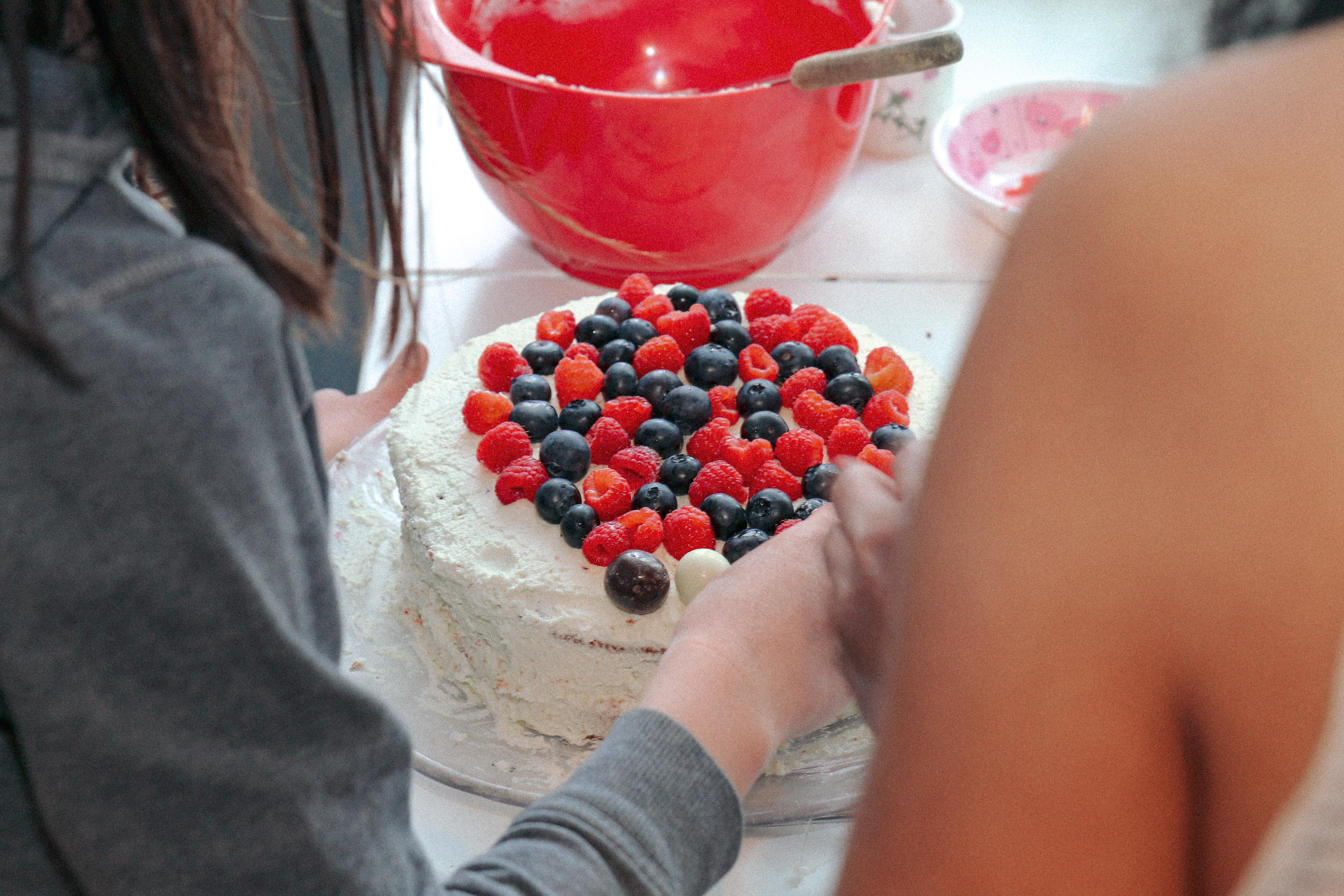
A served bløtkake topped with berries. Often berries with the colors of the Norwegian flag are used.

- Bordstabelbakkels – a cookie with a rectangle shape, often baked at Christmas. The dough is made with eggs, sugar, flour, butter and yeast. After he has been rolled flat, the cakes can be cut out into a rectangle, preferably with a baking tray. Each cake gets a filling made from egg whites, sugar and almonds which can be fried in layers with them or put on after a time of frying. When the cakes are ready, they can be served in a stack.
- Byggrynskrem – a barley-based cream dessert, usually served with berries and apple juice.
- Kanelstenger or brune pinner – a type of cookie from white flour, butter, sugar, egg yolk, syrup, baking soda, cinnamon and vanilla sugar. The dough is usually pressed out into flat strips by hand. The strips are cut into narrow strips (sticks) at an angle after they have been fried but are still warm. They are decorated with eggs, chopped almonds and granulated sugar.
- Delfiakake – an uncooked flat, square or bar-shaped chocolate dessert, made with deep-fried fat.
- Dronning Mauds pudding – a dessert that predominantly consists of cream, kogel mogel and chocolate. Named after Queen Maud of Norway, daughter of King Edward VII. The dessert was developed and introduced in Haugesund, and is commonly consumed in the western region of Norway.
- Eggedosis – a dessert made from sugar and eggs, whipped into a fluffy cream. It is often used as a simple dessert and may contain vanilla sugar, cocoa powder, berries or other flavourings. A Norwegian tradition is to serve eggnog on the 17th of May (Constitution Day).

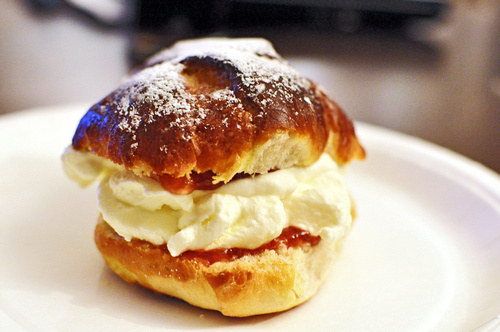
Fastelavnsbolle with whipped cream, jam and powdered sugar

- Fastelavnsbolle – a traditional sweet roll consisting of a cardamom-spiced wheat bun which has its top cut off and is then filled with whipped cream, topped with jam. The cut-off top serves as a lid and is dusted with powdered sugar. The buns are served at Sunday of Fastelavn (Shrove Sunday).
- Fattigmann – a Christmas pastry made with eggs, sugar, cream, wheat flour, cardamom and cognac. The ingredients are baked into an elastic dough, which is rolled, cut and folded, and finally deep-fried.

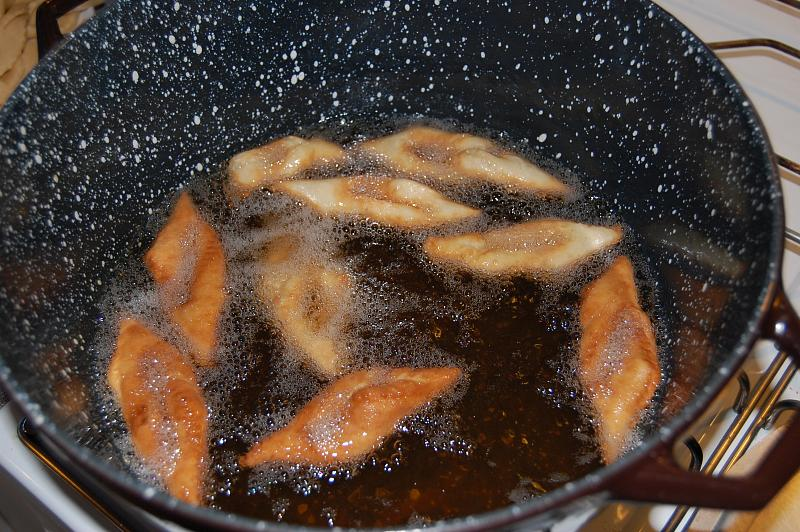
Fattigmenn are being deep-fried in oil for Christmas.

- Finskepinner – a cookie made from shortcrust pastry, often from bitter almonds, butter, white flour, water and sugar. The cakes are made small and oblong, with a shape like a rectangle or "sticks". Granulated sugar and crushed almonds (often sweet almonds) are placed on top of the cakes.
- Fyrstekake – a cake consisting of shortcrust pastry, almond filling or marzipan, rum, powdered sugar, butter, cardamom, cinnamon, and eggs. It typically has a signature lattice pattern on top and a decadent, moist filling. It is occasionally topped with whipped cream and served during Christmas, along with coffee or tea.
- Goro – a traditional sweet bread, which is pressed flat and commonly flavored with cardamom. It is a cross between a cookie, a cracker, and a waffle. Goros are made from a mixture consisting of eggs, sugar, cream, fat (butter or lard), flour and spices, baked in a special Goro iron (Gorojern).
- Havreflarn – oatmeal cookies with a brittle, crisp texture. It is prepared traditionally with rolled oats, brown sugar, flour, and various spices, such as cinnamon and nutmeg. Occasionally, they are topped with a chocolate drizzle for added flavor.
- Heitevegg – a dessert consisting of wheat buns served with a warm milk mixture on top. It is made with a mixture of milk and cream, sugar, butter and possibly cinnamon or cardamom, which is boiled and poured over the buns in a deep dish. The dish is associated with Fastelavn and the city of Bergen.
- Hjortetakk – a pastry cooked in lard. They are shaped like rings with small "spikes". It is common to mix eggs, sugar, butter and wheat flour. Baking soda or horn salt are common leavening agents. The dough is often flavored with cardamom, and cognac is also used.
- Ingefærnøtter – a cookie known for their spiced taste, utilizing ginger, cinnamon, nutmeg, cardamom, and black pepper in their recipes. They are frequently baked during Christmastime.

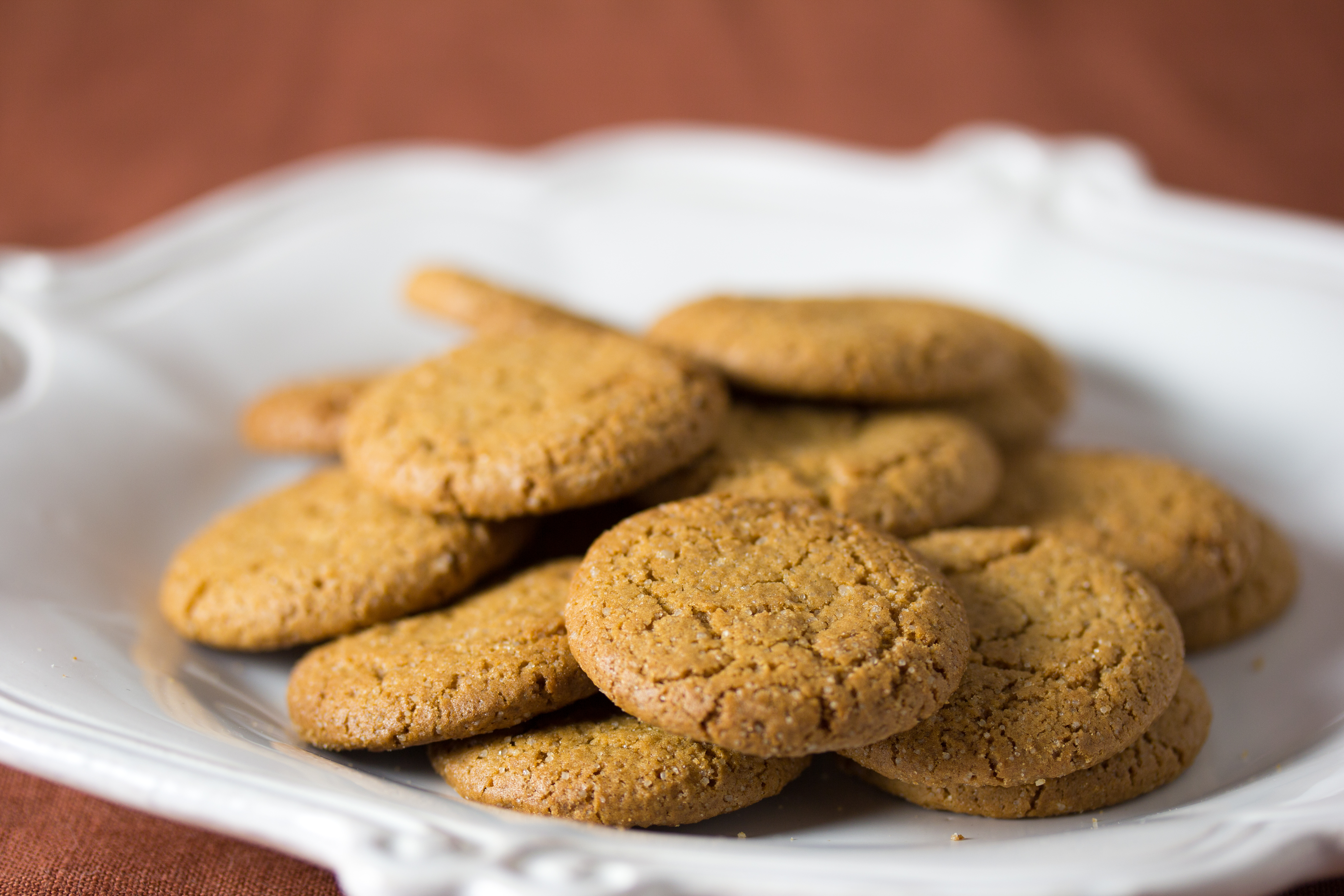
A plate of ingefærnøtter

- Jødekake – a group of cookies with Sephardic origins in Scandinavian cooking. The cookies are baked with beaten egg, sugar, flour and vegetable oil (e.g. olive oil) as a base.
- Julekake or julebrød – a Christmas yeast cake made with butter and sugar, spiced with cardamom, and containing candied fruits, raisins, and almonds. It can be eaten warm or toasted and served with butter.

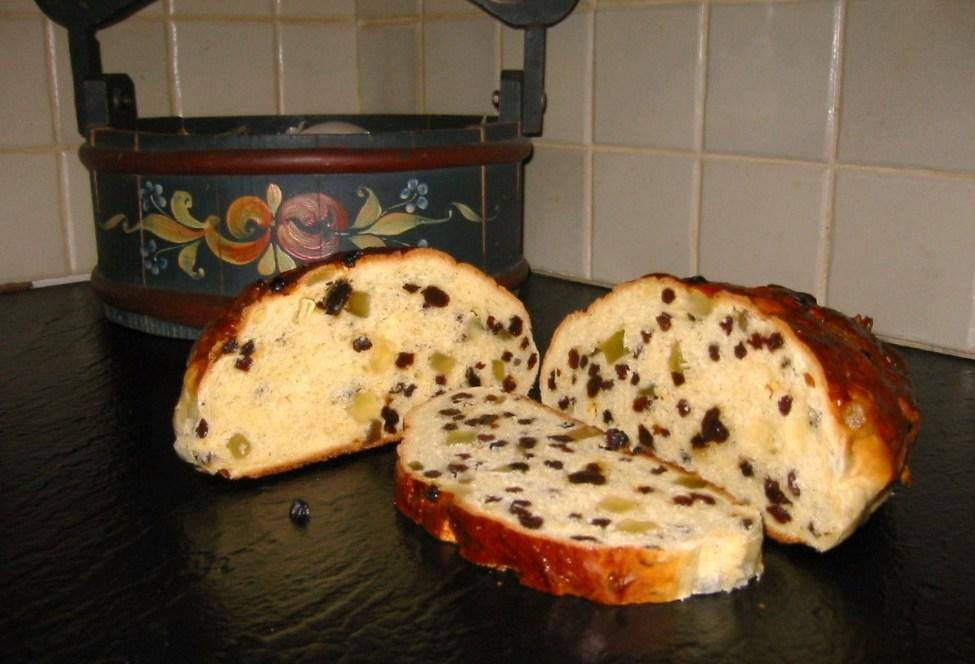
Julekake with raisins and succade

- Kakemann – a traditional Christmas cake especially in the southern part of Norway. It contains wheat flour, margarine, butter, milk, corn salt, sugar, but the recipe varies slightly within certain family traditions. Kakemann is usually decorated with food coloring and sugar, but chocolate is also used.
- Kalvedans – a classical Scandinavian dessert, made from unpasteurized colostrum milk, the first milk produced by a cow after giving birth.
- Kanelbolle or Skillingsbolle – a sweet roll consisting of a rolled sheet of yeast-leavened dough onto which a cinnamon and sugar mixture (and raisins or other ingredients in some cases) is sprinkled over a thin coat of butter. The dough is then rolled, cut into individual portions and baked.
- Klippekrans – a woven baked pastry sprinkled with cinnamon and sugar.
- Kokosmakroner – a traditional sweet Christmas cake, made from eggs, sugar, wheat flour and coconut mass. A perfect coconut macaroon is crispy on top and chewy inside. Some choose to have a chocolate glaze on top of the coconut macaroon.
- Kransekake – a traditional Danish and Norwegian confection, often eaten on special occasions. It is often prepared for Constitution Day celebrations, Christmas, weddings, and baptisms.
  - Kransekakestenger – bite-sized versions of the cake, are often prepared for Christmas. The cake is prepared in the same way as with the original version, but instead of being formed into rings they are set into small, straight portions between 5–8 cm (2–3 inches) long. They are then similarly decorated with white icing, though they may also be dipped in chocolate.

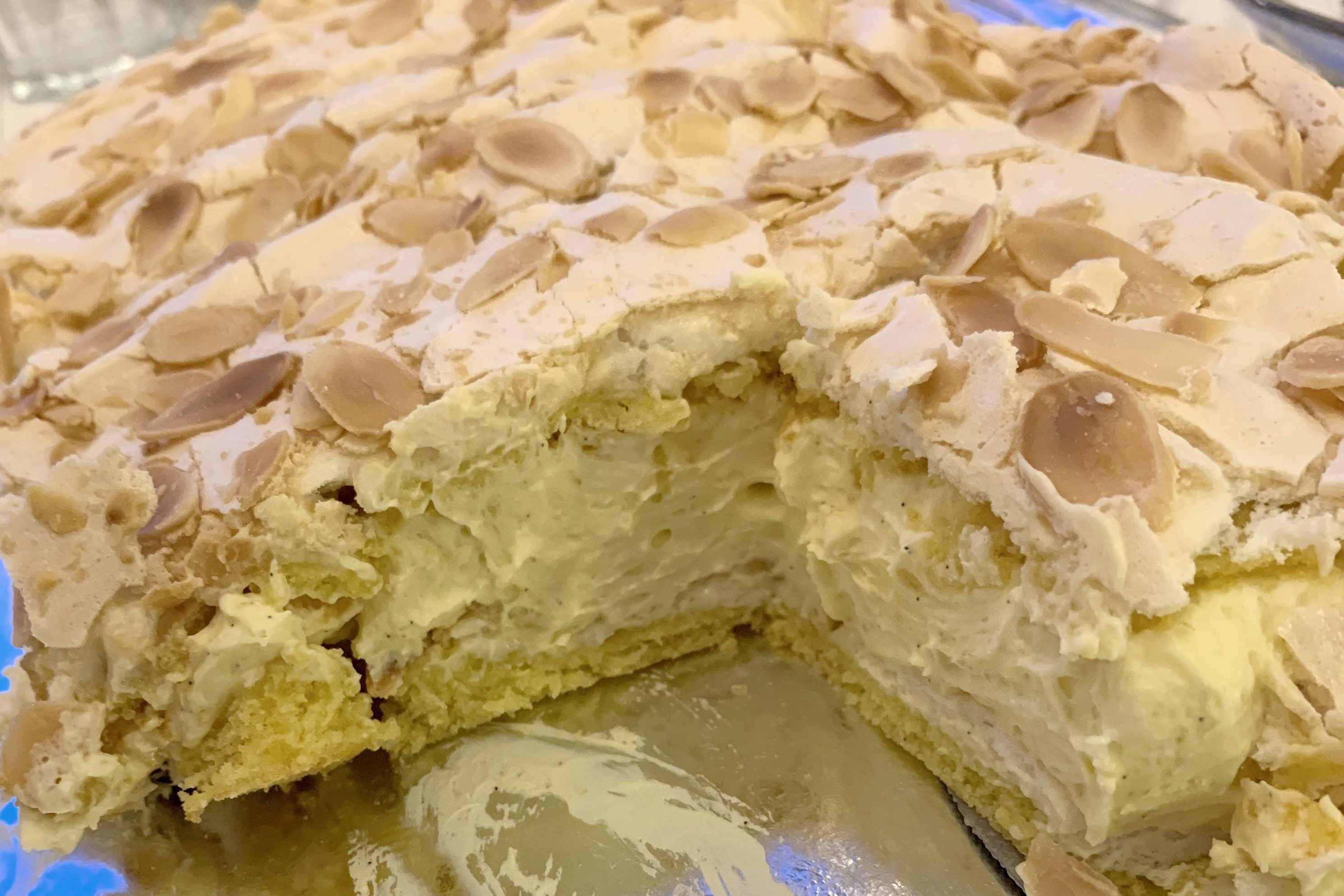
Kvæfjordkake

- Kringle – a Northern European pastry, a variety of pretzel. Kringler may be made from puff pastry (like Danish pastry) or yeast dough, filled with remonce or marzipan and raisins, sprinkled with coarse sugar, nut flakes or icing. Other types include saltkringler, small salty kringler – the Scandinavian equivalent of pretzels.
- Krydderkake – a spice cake flavored with a mixture of spices. The cake can be prepared in many varieties. Predominant flavorings include spices such as cinnamon, cloves, allspice, ginger, and nutmeg.
- Kvæfjordkake – a sponge cake baked with meringue, vanilla cream and almonds. Often seen at birthdays and family celebrations.
- Krumkake – a waffle cookie made of flour, butter, eggs, sugar, and cream. They can be eaten plain or filled with whipped cream (often multekrem) or other fillings.

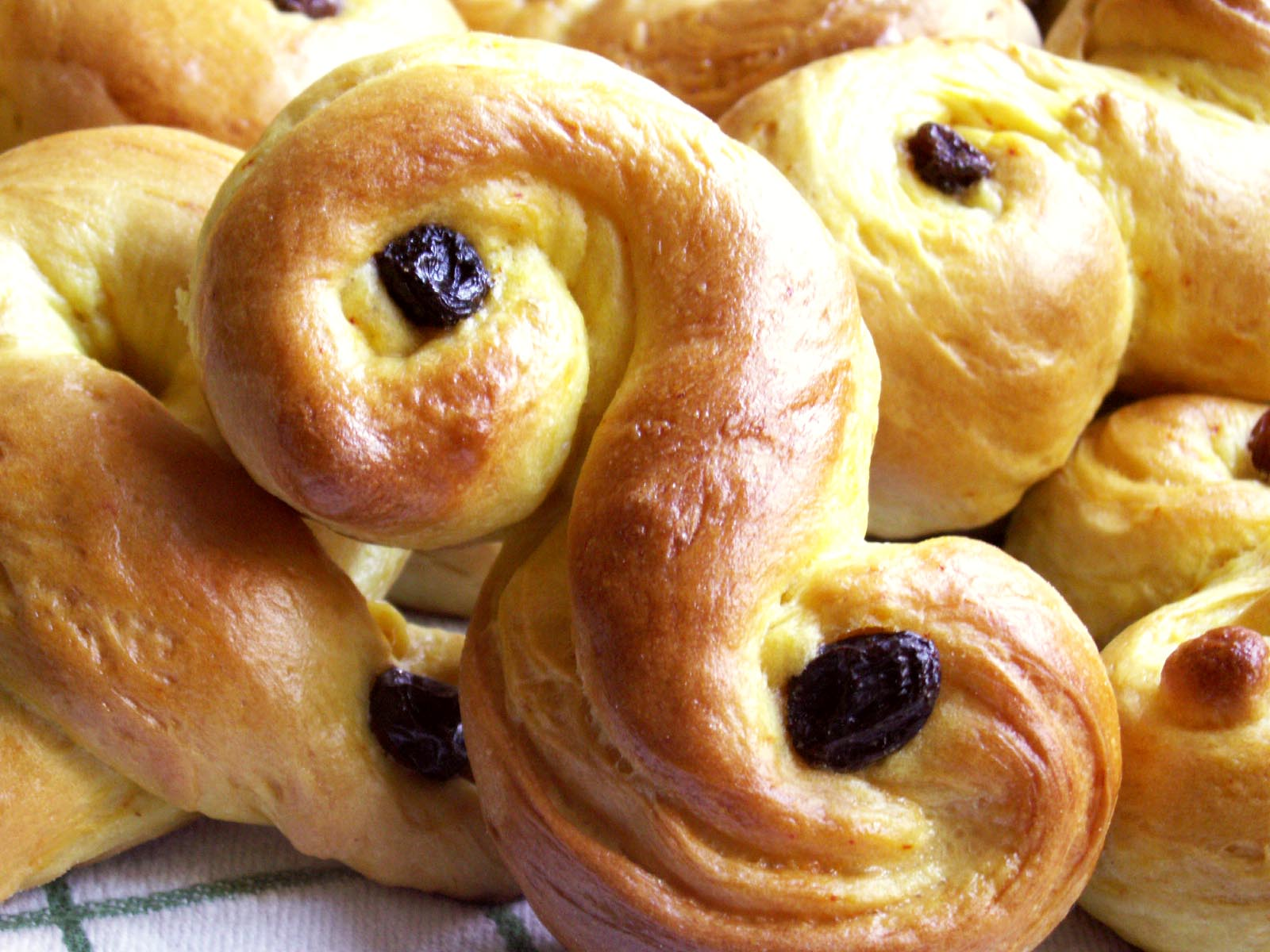
Lussekatter ready for serving, here with raisins

- Lussekatt – a type of yeast baked good which is primarily baked for St. Lucia's Day on 13 December. They are shaped like small S-shaped pretzels, and they should be yellow, and to get the right taste, the spice saffron is used. They are sometimes garnished with raisins.
- Marsipan – a confection consisting primarily of sugar, honey, and almond meal (ground almonds), sometimes augmented with almond oil or extract.
  - Marsipangris – During Christmas in Norway, a tradition is to eat a rice porridge known as risgrøt; a single almond is hidden in the porridge. Whoever finds the almond receives a marzipan pig as a prize.
- Marsipankake – a dessert featuring layers of sponge cake, vanilla cream, various puddings, jams, and other additives before being topped in a layer of marzipan.

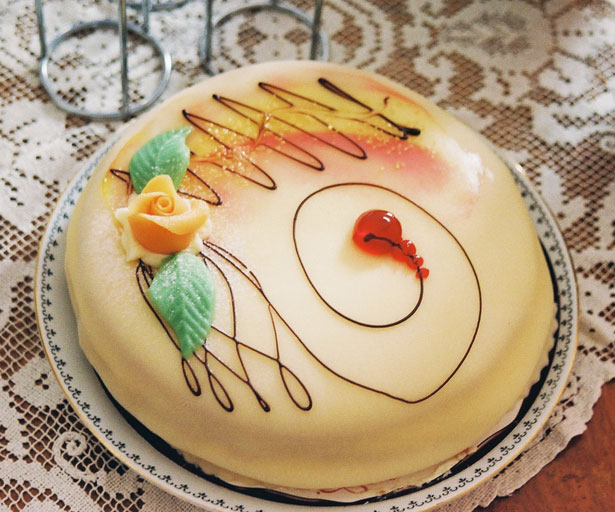
A marsipankake filled with vanilla cream and strawberry jam

- Marvpostei – a classic Christmas cake with the taste of almonds and cognac.
- Mor Monsen – a cake that is baked in a long pan and is often made for Christmas. It consists of butter, sugar, eggs, wheat flour, baking powder, almonds, coriander and preferably granulated sugar on top for decoration. When the cake is finished baking, it is divided into suitable serving pieces.
- Multekrem – a traditional Norwegian dessert made by mixing cloudberries with whipped cream and sugar. The cloudberries can be served as-is or heated. It is common to serve the multekrem with krumkake or kransekake. Multekrem is also a traditional Norwegian Christmas dinner dessert.
- Munker – a pastry that is baked in a special cast iron. Munker can be made with both yeast, baking soda, baking powder or eggs as a leavening agent. They are the Norwegian version of the Danish æbleskiver.
- Ostekake – a Norwegian cheesecake contains quark (or another unsalted cream cheese), eggs, milk and sugar. It is not baked but is instead kept in the fridge and has a jelly layer on top and a cookie foundation on the bottom.
- Pepperkake – a type of biscuit that is most often around the Christmas season. Common ingredients are wheat flour, sugar, margarine (or butter), syrup (or honey), baking soda, and the spices cinnamon, cloves, ginger and cardamom.
  - Pepperkakehus – a traditional pastry consisting of baked gingerbread, a binding agent (caster sugar or melted sugar) and decoration. The dough must be rolled out a little thicker than for thin gingerbread, preferably 4-8 mm before baking. The house is prepared before Christmas eve and is usually crushed and eaten by children after Christmastime.

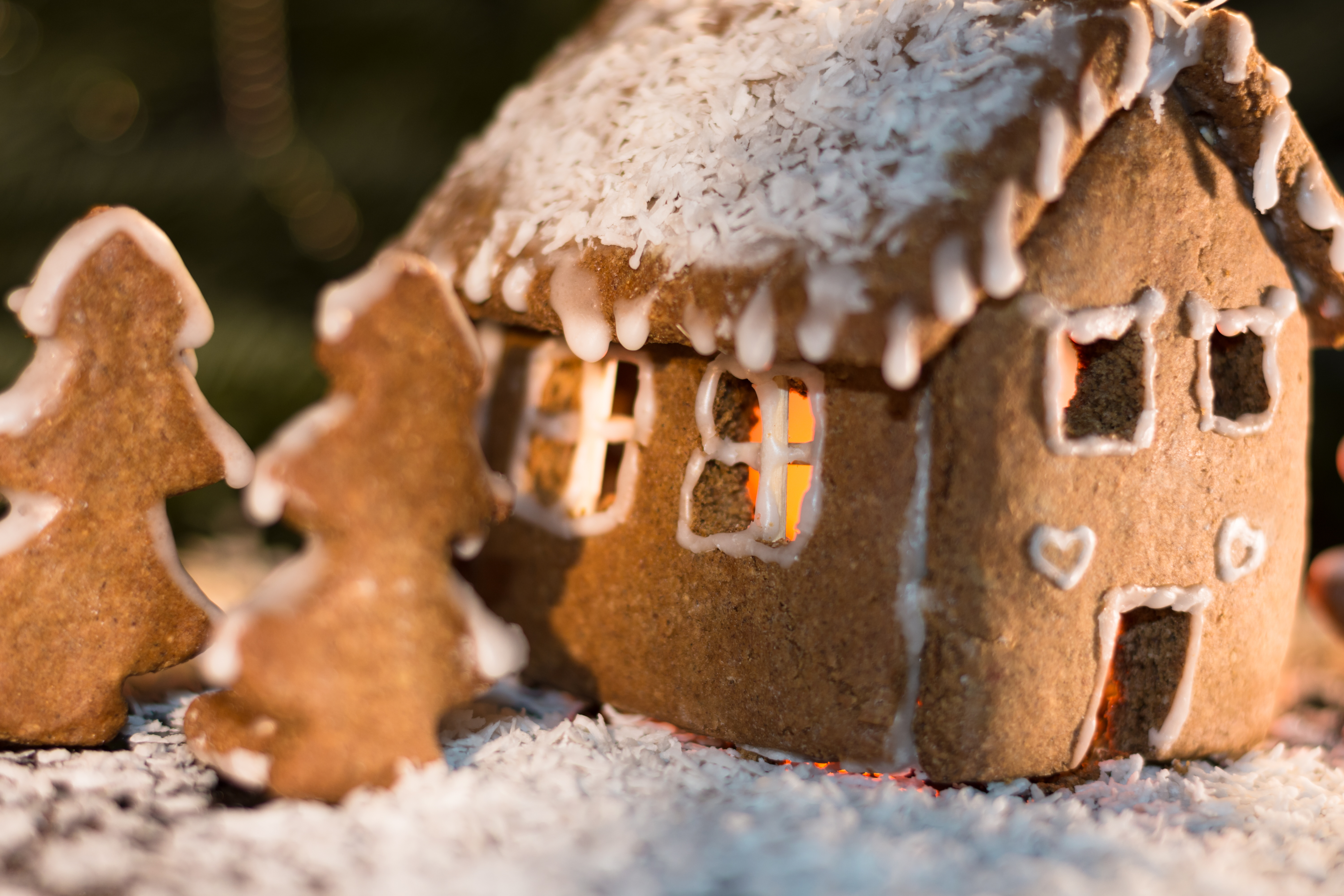
A gingerbread house with decorations

- Peppernøtter – small, hard cakes that are often baked at Christmas. The dough consists of eggs, sugar, syrup, butter and wheat flour as well as a spice mixture consisting of cinnamon, ginger, pepper and star anise. Horn salt is used as a leavening agent.
- Pikekyss (Girl's kisses) – light confectionary cakes of stiffly beaten egg whites and sugar or caster sugar fried at low heat. Meringue is often flavored with, for example, chocolate to make it taste better.
- Prinsessepudding / Semulepudding – a dessert pudding made from semolina, served with red sauce, and garnish with fresh berries. Sago pudding and polenta pudding are made in the same way – with sago or polenta grits.
- Rabarbrapai – a rhubarb pie or tart with sugar and often served with cream on top or ice cream on the side.
- Riskrem – a dessert consisting of cold rice porridge, sugar, vanilla sugar and whipped cream. It is served cold, preferably with lukewarm red sauce. It is common to have one or more whole almonds in the rice cream, where whoever finds this gets an "almond gift", preferably in the form of something edible such as marzipan pig or a chocolate.
  - Rød saus (Red sauce) – a collective term for dessert sauces made on the basis of red berries. The best red sauces are often made on the basis of concentrated raspberry or cherry juice, or a mixture of these. Mixtures with strawberries, blackcurrants, currants, blueberries or even lingonberries and gooseberries can be used, as long as the desired red color is retained.

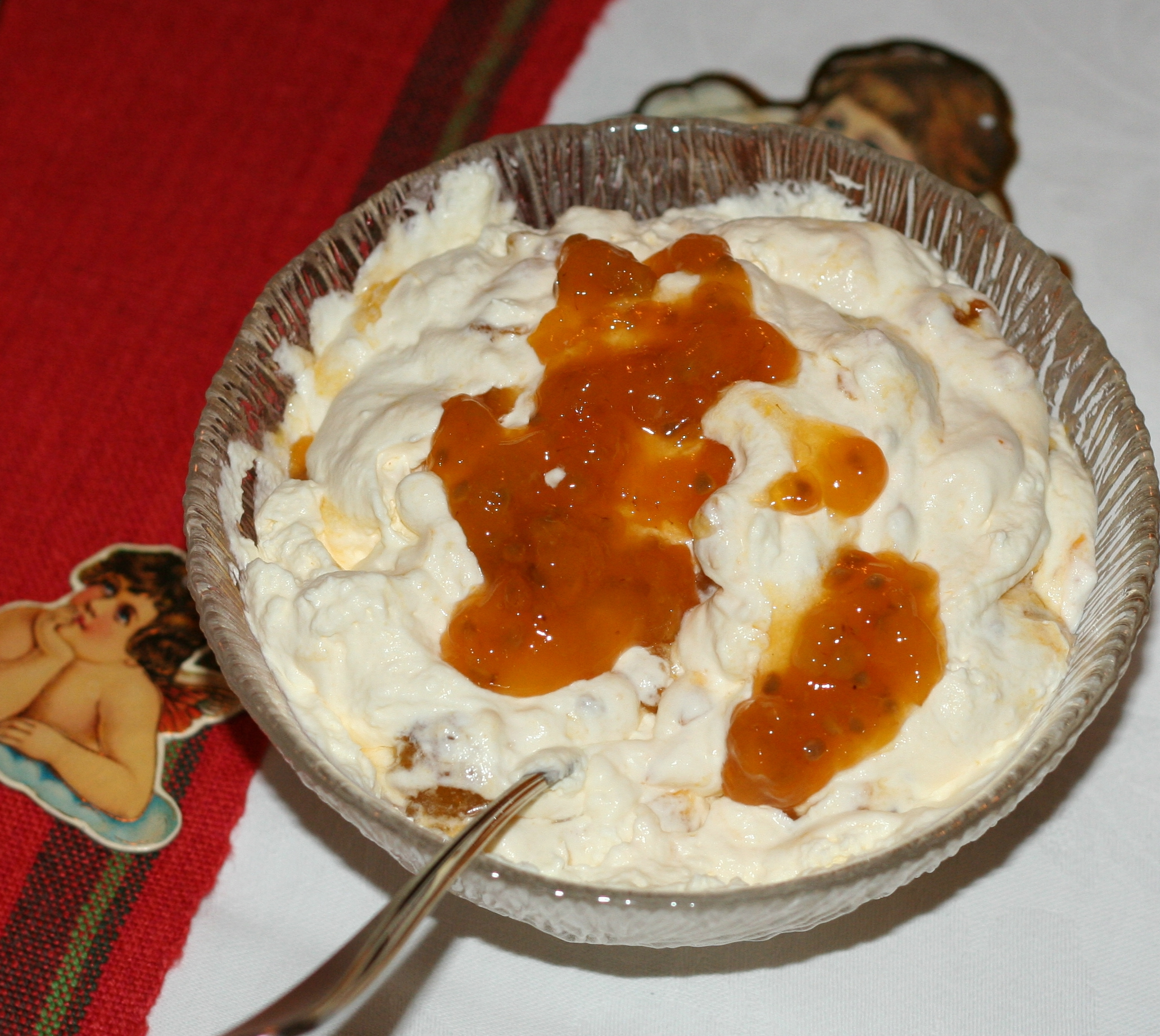
A bowl of multekrem

- Rosettbakkelse – thin, cookie-like fritters made with iron molds. Rosettes are crispy and typified by their lacy pattern, and traditionally made during Christmas time.
- Russedessert – a sweet, wheat semolina (manna) dessert porridge made with berries, usually lingonberries. The dessert is usually served with milk and optionally sugar. Other berries and fruit that can be used are redcurrants, cranberries, apricots, gooseberries and strawberries.
- Rømmebrød – a dessert which is baked in several places in Norway, made with sour cream and baked in a distinct iron.
- Saftsuppe – a dessert soup made from various juices, water, and a thickening agent, usually either potato flour or cornstarch. Dried fruit such as raisins or sago groats are added as well. It is frequently served with pancakes or vanilla ice cream. It can be made from a variety of juices, such as blueberry juice, pineapple juice, and currant juice.

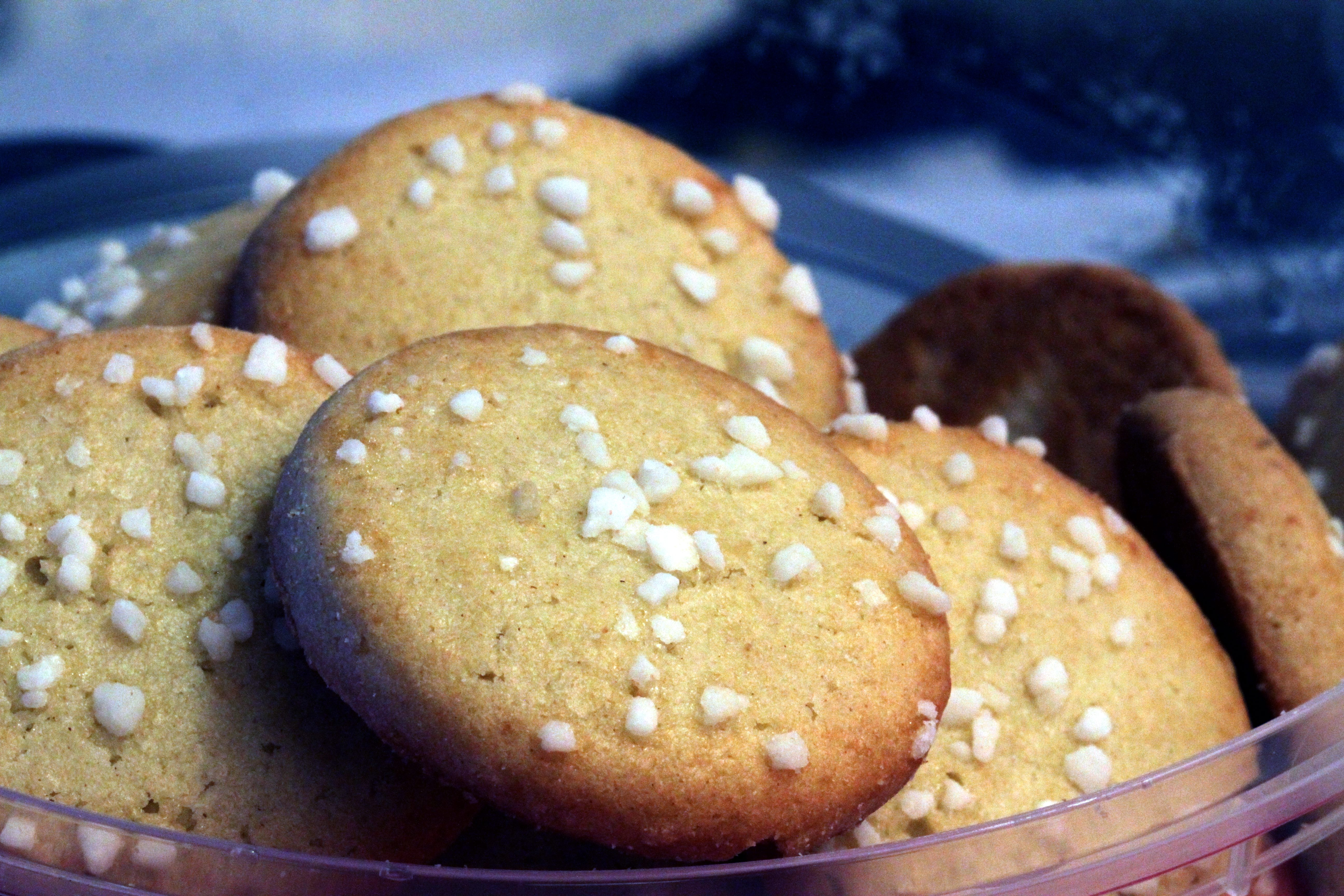
A plate with serinakaker

- Sandbakelse or Sandkake – a type of a sugar cookie commonly served during Christmas in Norway. Sandbakelse are made of flour, ground almond, butter, eggs, sugar, and almond extract—possibly with vanilla or rarely cardamom. After the dough is mixed and cooled, it is pressed into fluted tins. They can be eaten as is with coffee or filled with berries, jam and cream.
- Sandnøtter – a light and porous Christmas cookie made with butter, sugar, eggs and flour.
- Sarah Bernard – a cake with a chewy almond base with soft chocolate cream and chocolate glaze on top.
- Serinakaker – a butter cookie made with flour, granulated sugar, eggs, and topped with pearl sugar. They have a similar texture to shortbread and are served around Christmastime. Occasionally, they are topped with slivered almonds or various nuts.
- Sirupssnipp – traditional Christmas cookies consisting of a dough of syrup, butter, eggs, sugar, milk, flour, and baking powder or horn salt with various spices. The dough is rolled out thinly and the cakes are cut into slices or cut out with shapes and decorated with half an almond.

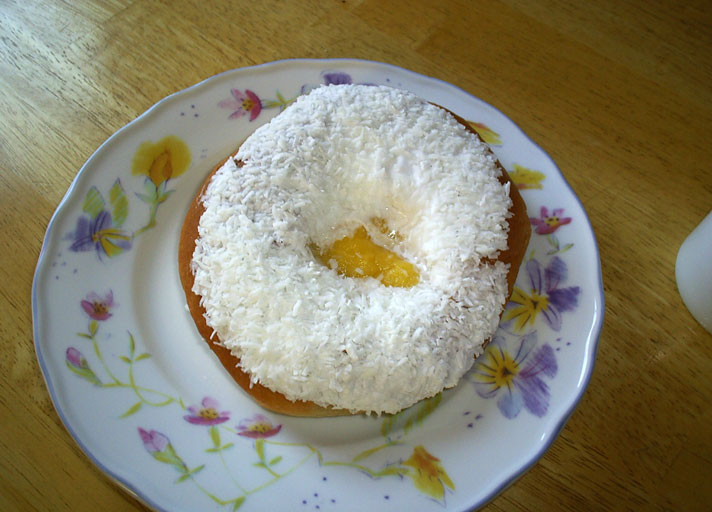
A skolebrød bun

- Skolebrød – a type of sweet roll made from yeasted dough filled with custard and decorated with icing dipped in grated coconut.
- Skrivarbrød – a small, flat cake that has been drawn or written on during baking. It is a form of goro or avletter that is covered with a little batter after they have been fried, and decorated in a pattern.
- Solbolle – In Arctic Norway, a sweet roll with cinnamon, and without icing and coconut is eaten to celebrate the return of the sun after polar night.
  - Mørketidsbolle – a solbolle but coated with dark chocolate on the outside and vanilla cream inside, eaten in Tromsø when the sun is gone.
- Smultring – cake donuts, they are small and usually prepared without glazing or filling and are often spiced with cardamom, cinnamon, lemon or orange zest, as well as various liqueurs.
- Suksessterte – a cake with two layers: an almond base and an egg-based cream layer. Decoration on the top layer can come in the form of, among other things, edible flowers, almond flakes, nuts and chocolate powder or stripes, but it is also common to present the cake without decoration on the top layer.

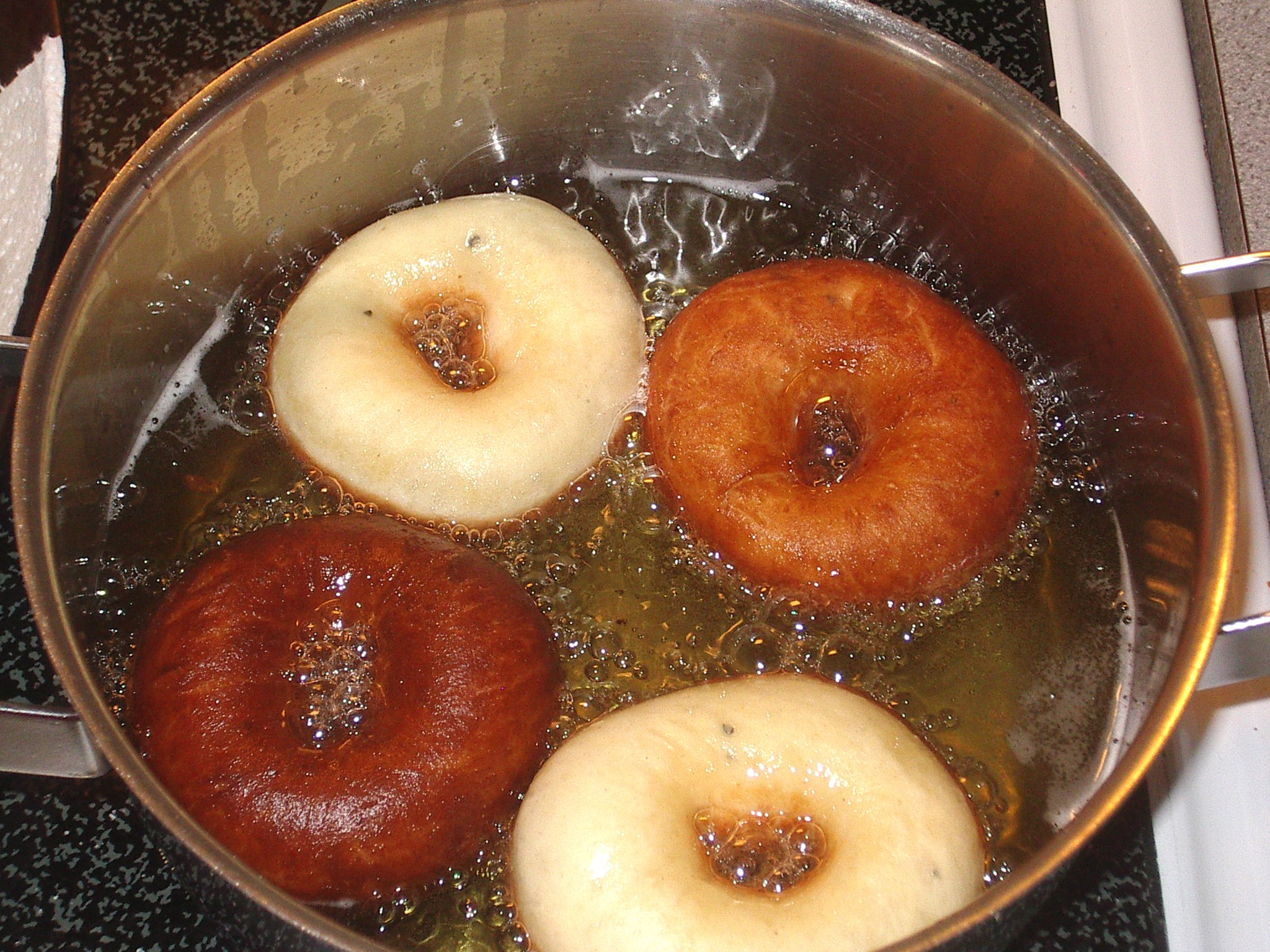
Deep-frying smultringer

- Surmelkskake – a sheet cake made with sour milk, often topped with a chocolate glaze.
- Søsterkake – a yeast pastry, typical for the coastal areas of Aust-Agder. The cake is raised with yeast and baked in a toaster oven or oven. The ingredients in the sister cake dough are wheat flour, sugar, milk, margarine, yeast, cardamom and raisins, and the cake is baked in a mold.
- Tilslørte bondepiker – a traditional dessert, typically served in transparent in glass or bowls. Mashed apples (or other mashed fruits) are spread out at the bottom, followed by a layer of whipped cream, a layer of toasted bread- or rusk crumbs, followed by another layer of whipped cream and usually a thin layer of crumbs on top. Possible decorations also include hazelnuts or flaked almonds.
- Toscakake – a Scandinavian cake consisting of sugar bread with a lid of roasted almonds.
- Treak – a distinctive sweet made from brown sugar, cream and juniper, and reminiscent of toffee in texture, with a mild taste of juniper.
- Troikakake – a layered cake with an almond base, dark chocolate, raspberry jelly, chocolate truffle cream, marzipan and chocolate glaze.
- Trollkrem – a dessert made from lingonberries, sugar and whipped egg whites. Some also use some vanilla sugar. The dessert is sometimes served with custard. Trollkrem is most commonly used in the autumn when fresh lingonberries are available.
- Vørterkake or vørterbrød – a bread or cake-shaped yeast pastry made from rye and wheat flour with added herbs, milk, spices, syrup and other things.

== See also ==
- Norwegian cuisine
- List of Norwegian cheeses
- List of Norwegian desserts
