= Ingefærnøtter =

Norwegian ginger cookie

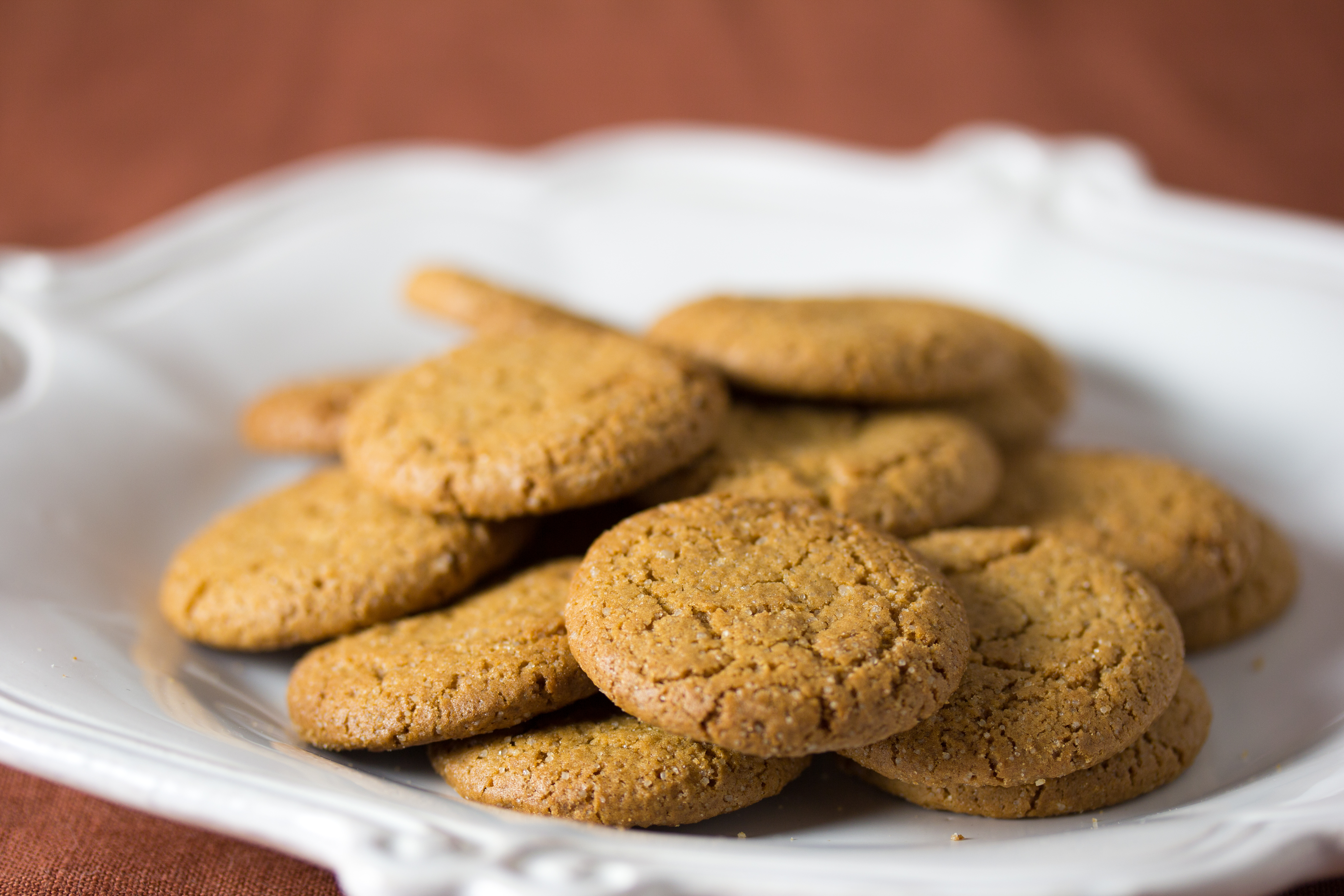
- Plate of ingefærnøtter
- Type: Cookie
- Course: Dessert
- Place of origin: Norway
- Main ingredients: Ginger
- Ingredients generally used: Flour, sugar, spices
- Similar dishes: Gingersnap

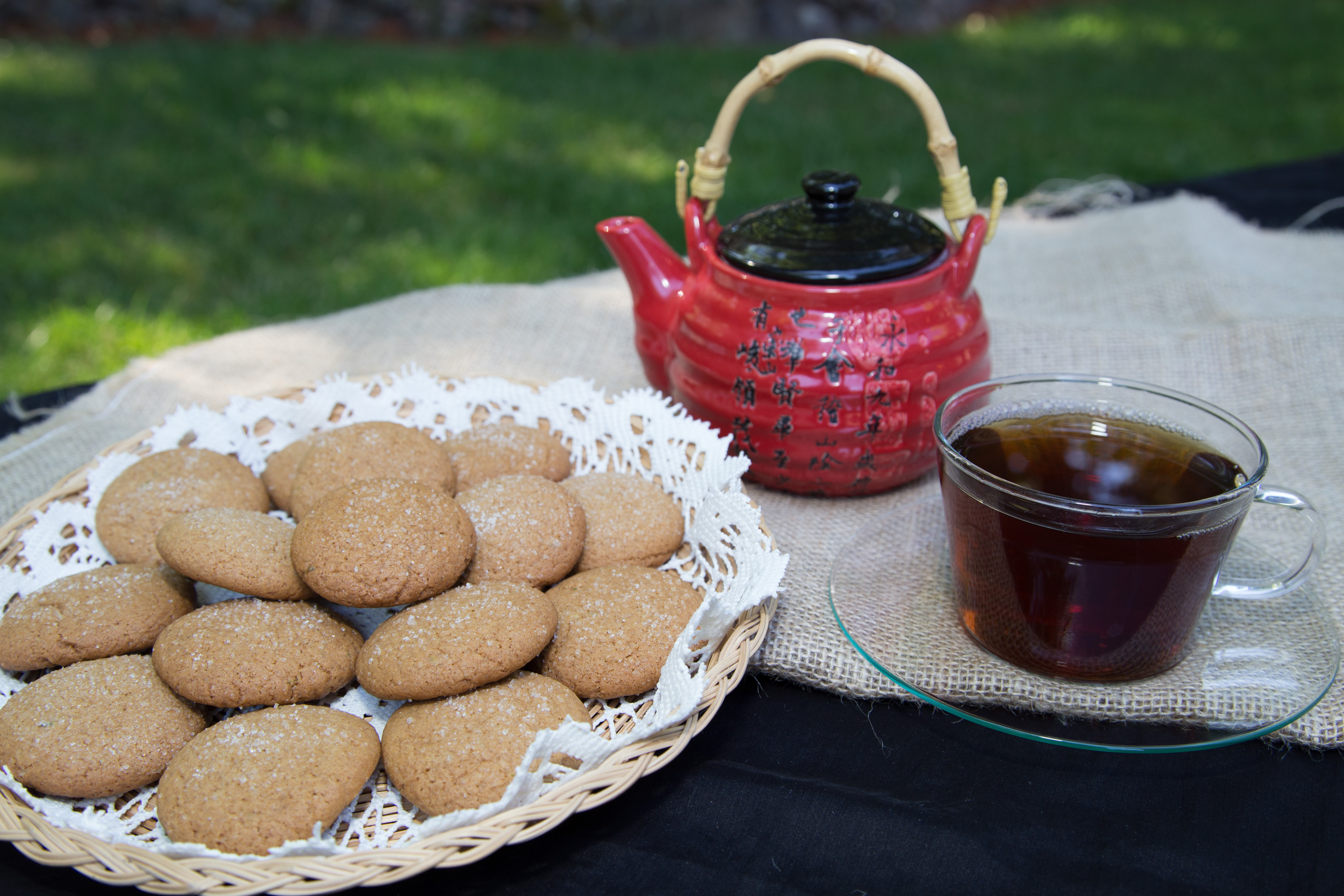
Tray of ingefærnøtter with tea

Ingefærnøtter, or ginger nuts, are a Norwegian cookie known for their spiced taste, utilizing ginger, cinnamon, nutmeg, cardamom, and black pepper in their recipes. They are frequently baked during Christmastime in regions throughout Norway as one of the syv slag, or "seven kinds (of christmas cookies)", served.

== Gallery ==
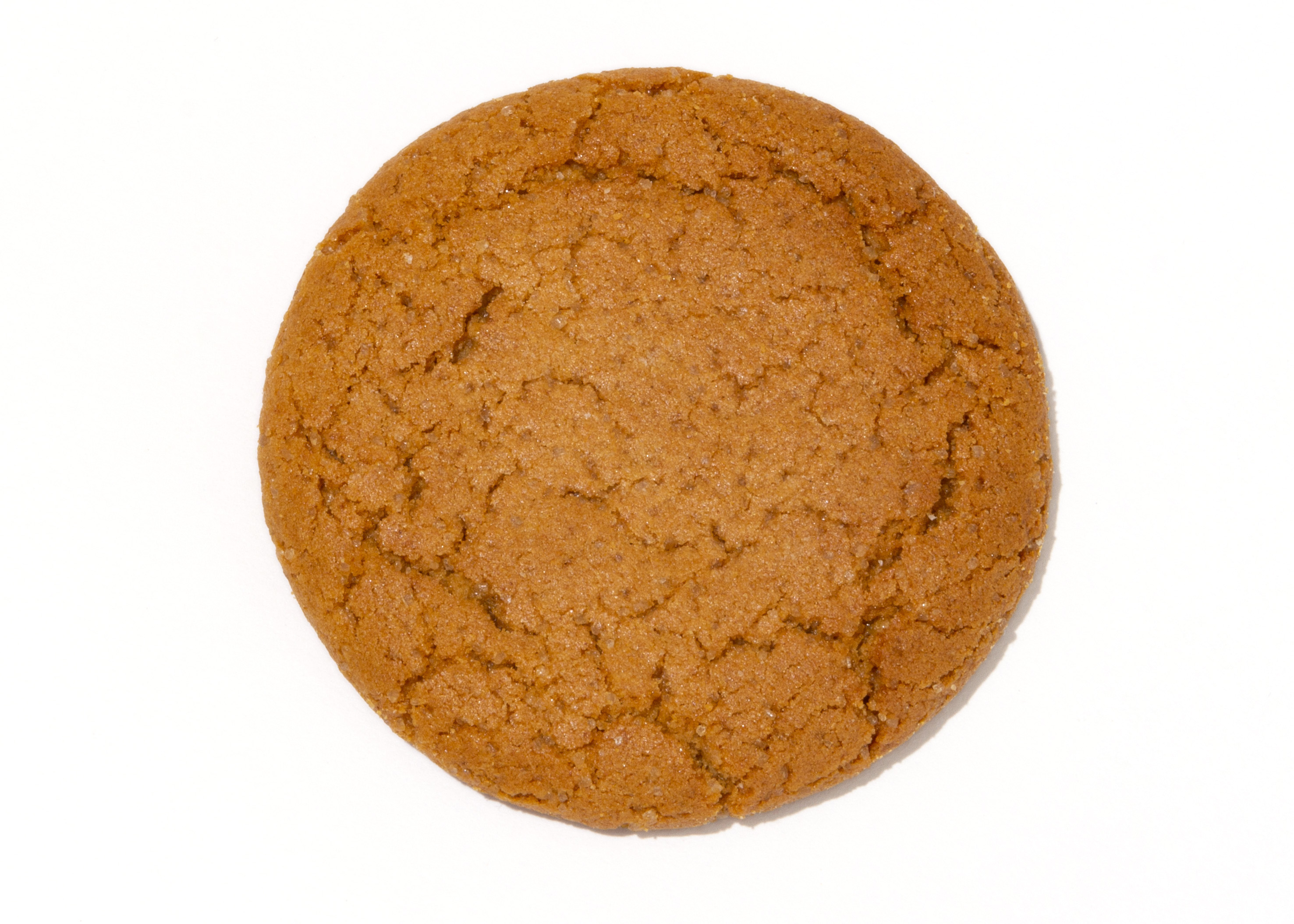
Individual ingefærnøtter

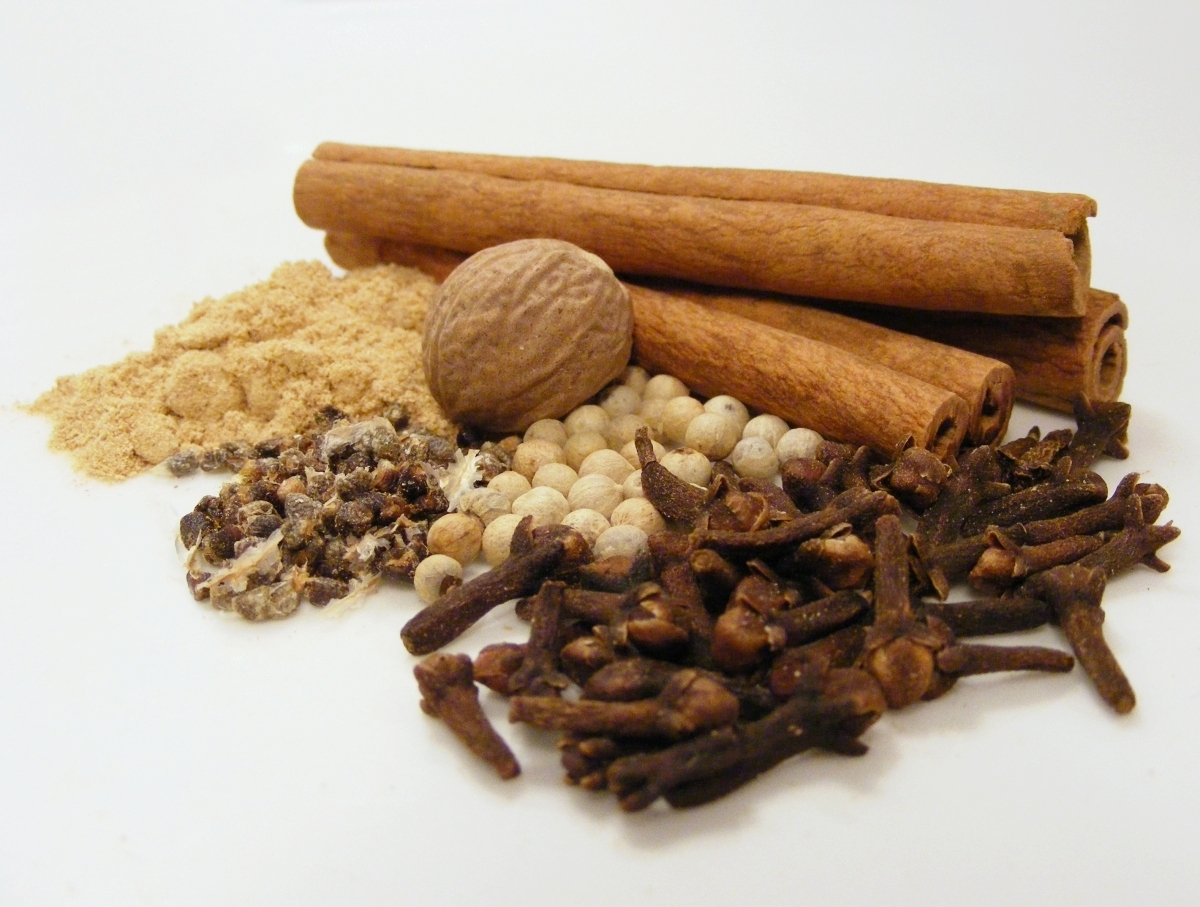
Variety of spices used

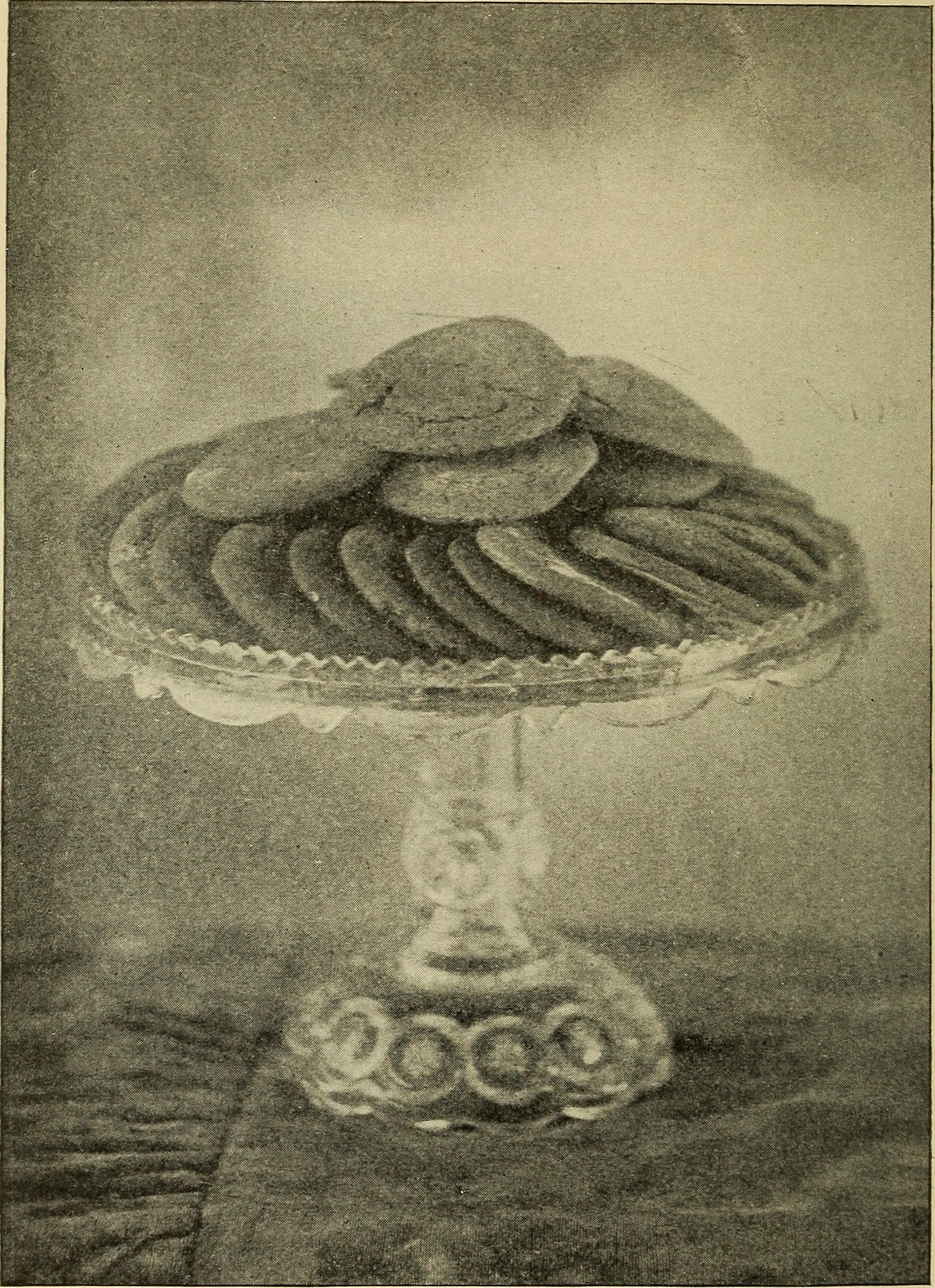
Tray of ingefærnøtter

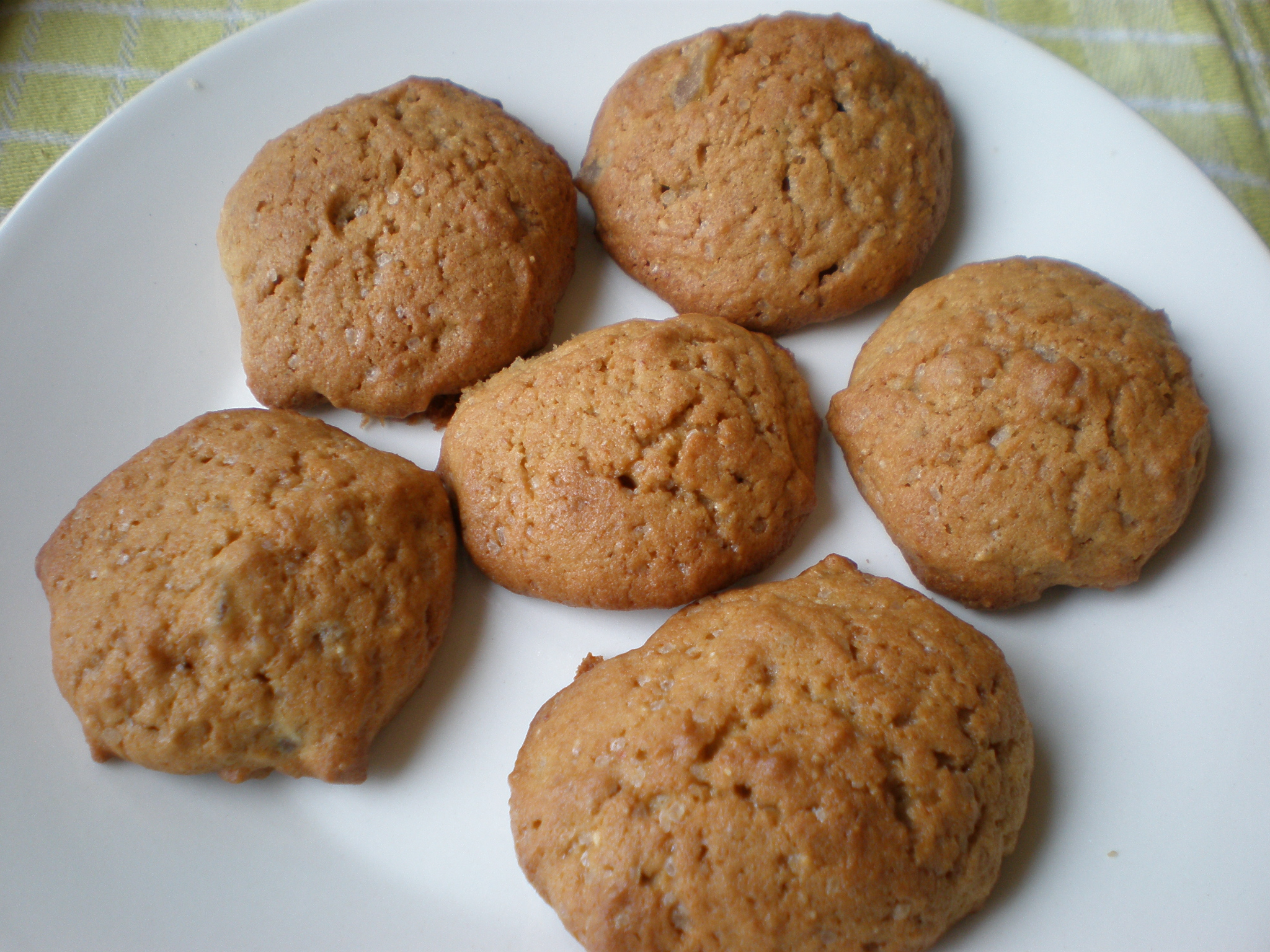
More ingefærnøtter

== See also ==
- List of Norwegian desserts
- Norwegian cuisine
- Gingersnap
