= List of Norwegian desserts =

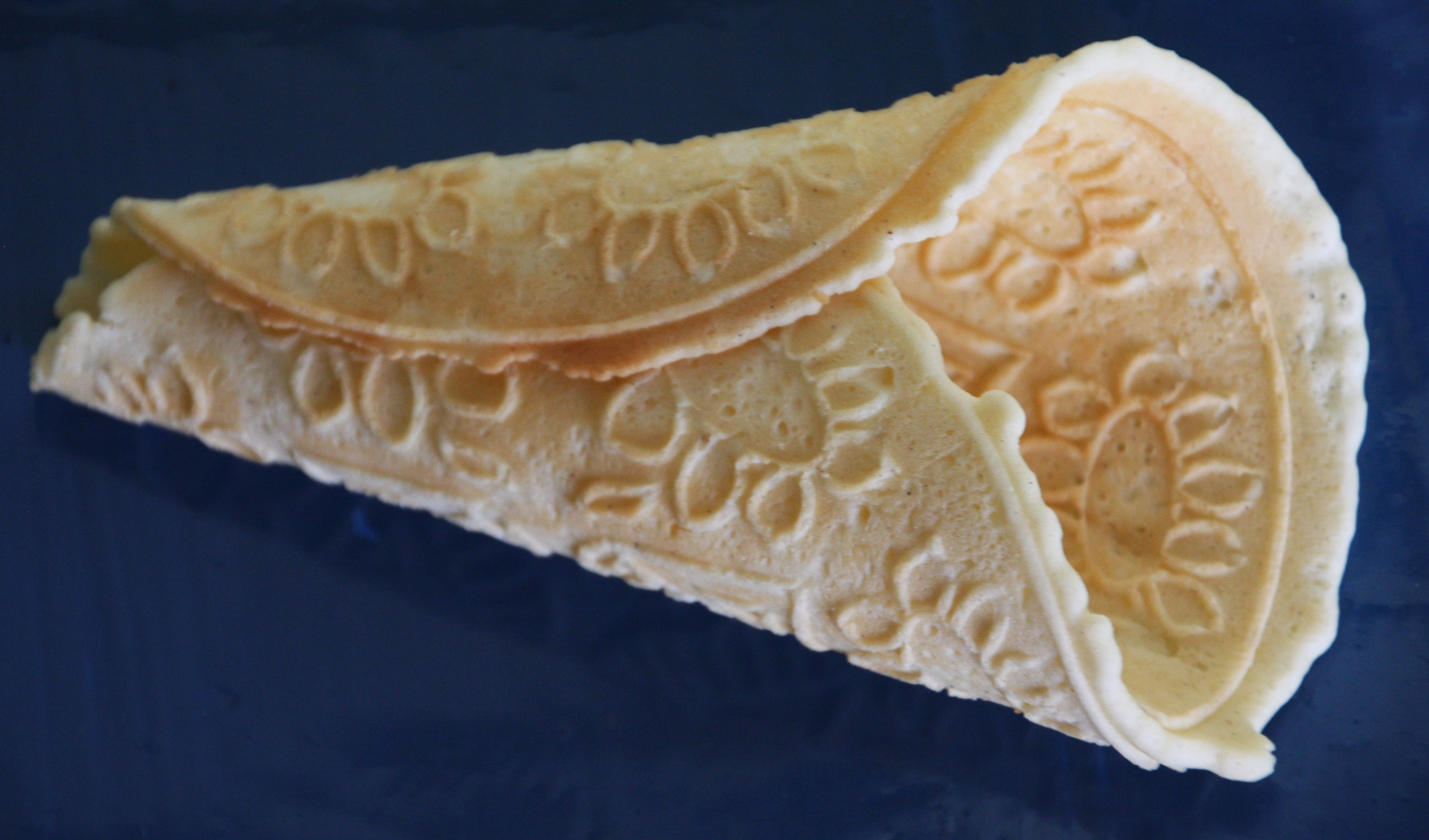
Krumkake is a Norwegian waffle cookie

This is a list of Norwegian sweets and desserts. The cuisine of Norway refers to food preparation originating from Norway or having a played a great historic part in Norwegian cuisine. Norway also shares many dishes and influences with surrounding Scandinavian countries, such as Sweden, Finland, and Denmark.

== Characteristics ==
Norwegian desserts mainly feature small, tart fruits, such as strawberries, blueberries, lingonberries, gooseberries, and cloudberries, due to their ability to grow in colder climates. Rye flour is a very common ingredient in bread-based recipes, as well as almonds and almond flavoring.

Holidays in Norway feature particularly decadent and intricate desserts, as Christmas is an important holiday in Norwegian culture.

== Norwegian desserts ==
Name	Image	Description
Almond cake		Moist, sweet cake flavored and topped with almonds, typically featuring layers of cream in between cake layers
Berlinerkrans		Known as Berlin wreaths. A butter cookie curled into a wreath formation, typically served during Christmas
Bløtkake		Cream cake topped with a mixture of berries and frequently served during Constitution Day
Brødpudding		Pudding made from day-old bread, cream, eggs, syrup, and occasionally fruit or other toppings
Brune pinnar		Spiced, stick-shaped almond cookies made with syrup. Translates to brown pins
Byggrynskrem		Barley-based cream dessert, usually served with berries
Delfiakake		Uncooked flat, square or bar-shaped chocolate snack/dessert, similar to a fudgey chocolate brownie but with alternating lighter and darker areas
Dessertsuppe		Sweet soup made from sugar and fruit
Diplomatpudding		Pudding made in a mold, featuring ladyfingers soaked in rum or Kirsch flavored syrup, layered with candied fruit, apricot jam, and an egg custard or Bavarian cream
Dronning Mauds pudding		Pudding dessert that predominantly consists of cream, kogel mogel and chocolate
Eggedosis		Dessert made from sugar and eggs, whipped into a fluffy cream
Fastelavnsbolle		Traditional sweet roll filled with cream
Fattigmannsbakkels		Otherwise known as angel wings. Deep-fried and served during Christmas
Fruktkake		Cake made with candied or dried fruit, nuts, and spices, and optionally soaked in spirits
Fruktsuppe		Dessert soup made from pureed fruit
Fyrstekake		Cake filled with almond, rum, and other fillings
Gløgg		Alcoholic drink usually made with red wine, along with various mulling spices and sometimes raisins, served hot or warm
Goro		Cookie similar to a cracker or thin waffle, made in a press
Havreflarn		Traditional oatmeal cookies
Ingefærkaker		Cake made with ginger, cardamom, cinnamon, allspice, and nutmeg, as well as molasses
Julekake / Julebrød		Christmas bread filled with raisins and candied fruit and scented with cardamom
Jødekake		Round shortbread biscuit
Kalvedans (Råmjølkspudding)		Classic Scandinavian dessert. It is a pudding made from unpasteurized colostrum milk, the first milk produced by a cow after giving birth
Kanelstenger		Stick shaped cookies rolled in cinnamon
Karamellpudding		Pudding made with caramel and vanilla flavouring
Kokosmakroner		Coconut macaroons made of eggs, sugar, wheat flour and coconut
Kompott		Whole or pieces of fruit in sugar syrup. Whole fruits are cooked in water with sugar and spices
Kransekake		Rings of cakes stacked together with layers of vanilla icing in between
Norsk Kringle		Soft pastry typically topped with melted sugar
Krumkake		Thin waffle cookie rolled in a cone
Lefse		Thin pastry topped with different additives. Incarnations of it includeTynnlefse, Tjukklefse / Tykklefse, Nordlandslefse, and Anislefse
Marmorkake / Tigerkake		Cake with different flavors, usually chocolate and vanilla, mixed into one cake to create a marble texture
Marsipan		Confection consisting primarily of sugar, honey, and almond meal, sometimes augmented with almond oil or extract
Marsipankake		Sponge cake filled with jam or cream, topped with marzipan
Multekrem		Dessert made by mixing cloudberries with whipped cream and sugar
Munker		Fluffy fried pastry, rolled in a ball shape
Ostekake		Cake made from cream cheese and featuring a graham-cracker crust
Pepperkake		Crispy cookie made from ginger, cinnamon, and other spices
Peppernøtt		Small anise-flavored cookies
Pikekyss (marengs)		Cream dessert made from whipped egg whites and sugar, and occasionally an acidic ingredient such as lemon, vinegar, or cream of tartar
Pleskener		Thick cookie made from sugar, butter, and flour.
Rabarbrapai		Pie stuffed with rhubarb and sugar, to balance out the tartness of the fruit
Riskrem		Dessert made of rice pudding mixed with whipped cream, sugar, vanilla, and chopped almonds
Russedessert		Sweet, wheat semolina dessert porridge made with berries, usually lingonberries
Rosettes (Rosettbakkels)		Thin, cookie-like fritters made with iron molds
Saftsuppe		Dessert soup made from various juices, water, and a thickening agent, usually either potato flour or cornstarch
Sago pudding		Sweet pudding made by combining sago pearls with either water or milk and adding sugar and sometimes additional flavourings
Sandbakelse		Butter cookies flavored with almond extract
Serinakaker		Almond-flavored butter cookies with sliced almonds and pearled sugar on top
Skolebrød		Buns filled with custard and topped with powdered sugar
Smultring		Traditional Norwegian doughnut
Spice cake (Krydderkake)		Moist cake spiced with various flavorings, usually cinnamon or allspice
Svele		Thick, pancake-like dessert served with brunost
Tilslørte bondepiker		Apple and cream trifle served in glasses
Troikakake		Layered chocolate cake
Trollkrem		Mousse made from lingonberries
Verdens Beste / Kvæfjordkake		Cake flavored with almonds and custard
Wreath cake rods (Kransekakestenger)		Small sticks of kransekake with a chocolate or icing sugar coating

== Gallery ==
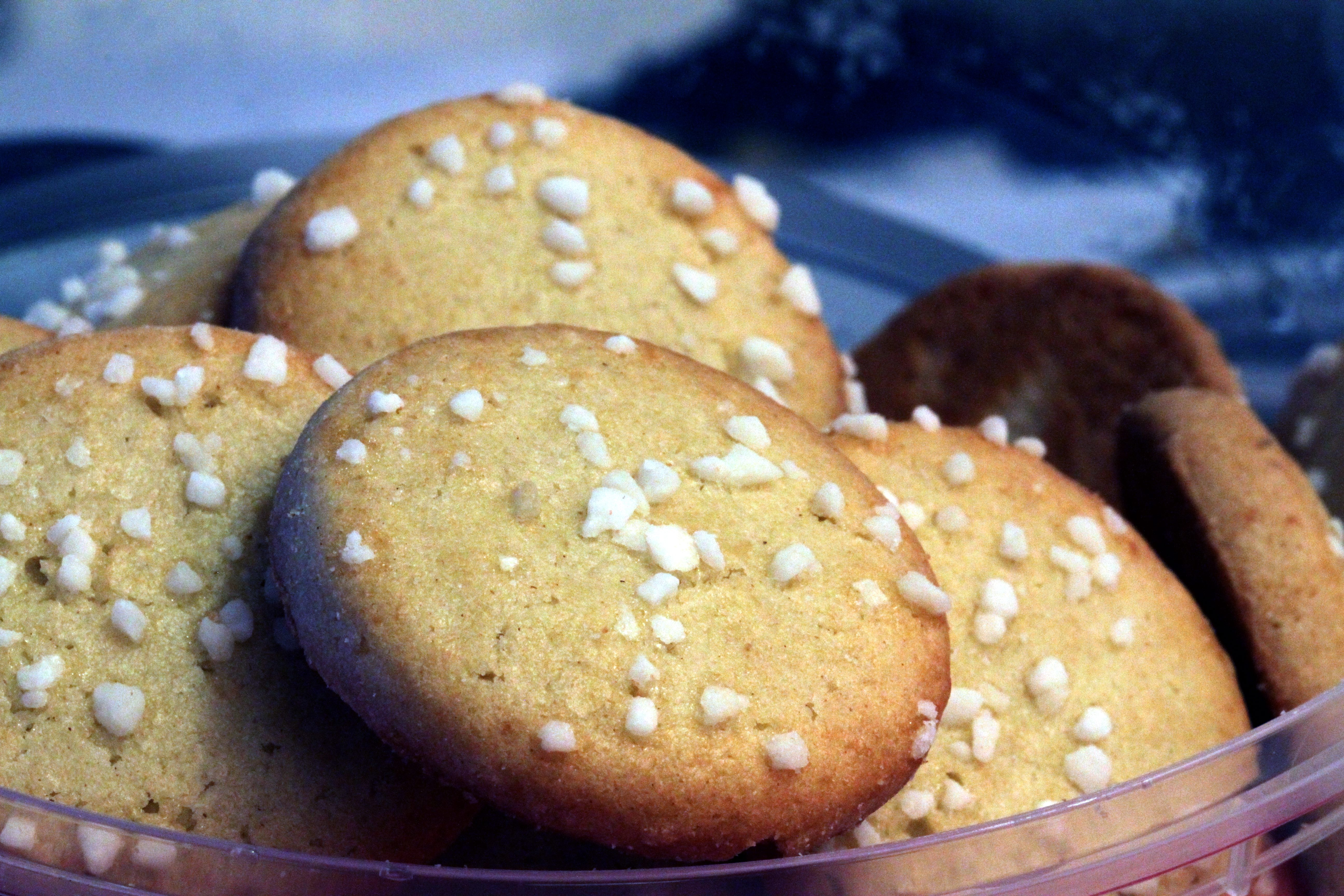
Serinakaker cookies topped with pearled sugar

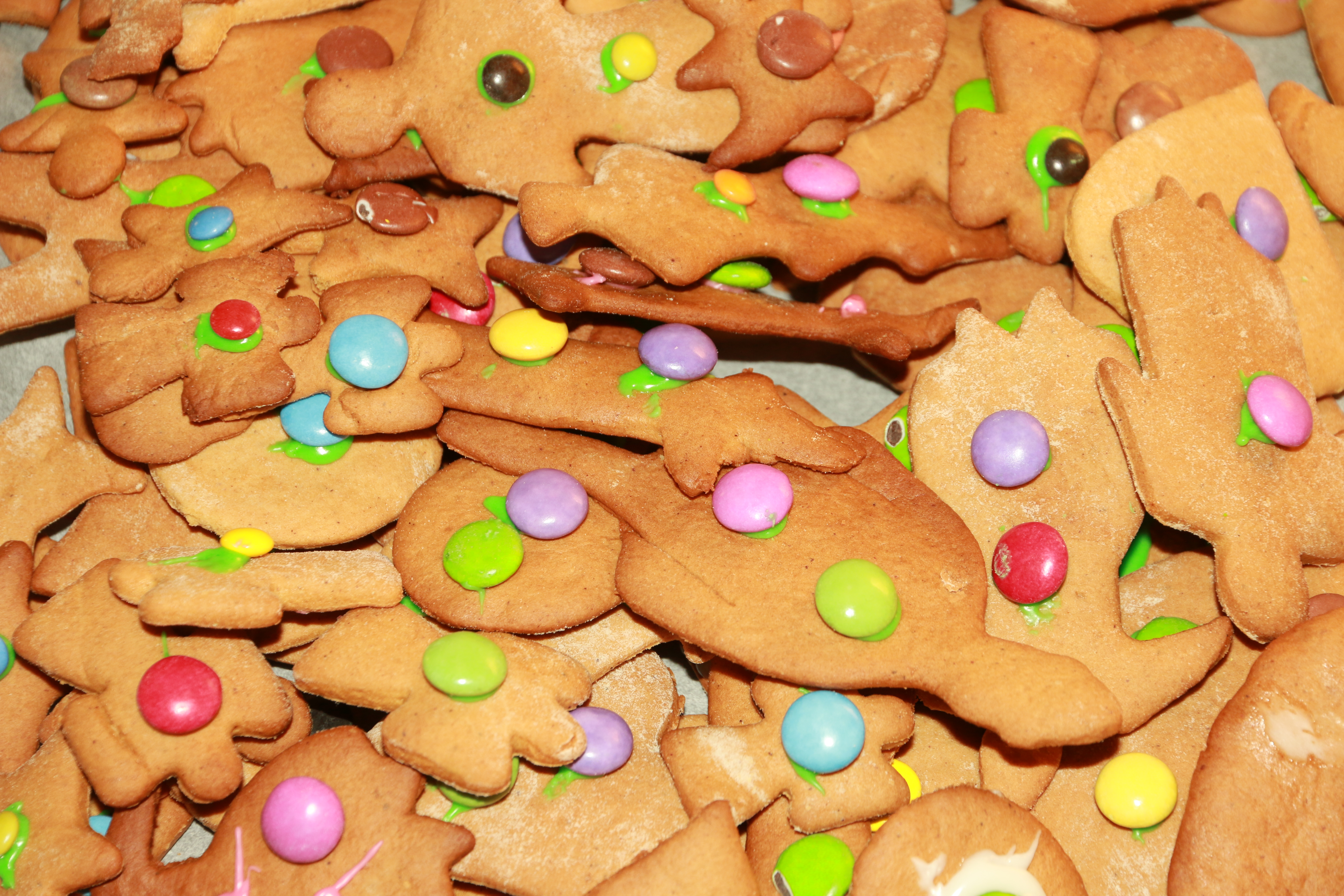
Decorated pepperkaker cookies

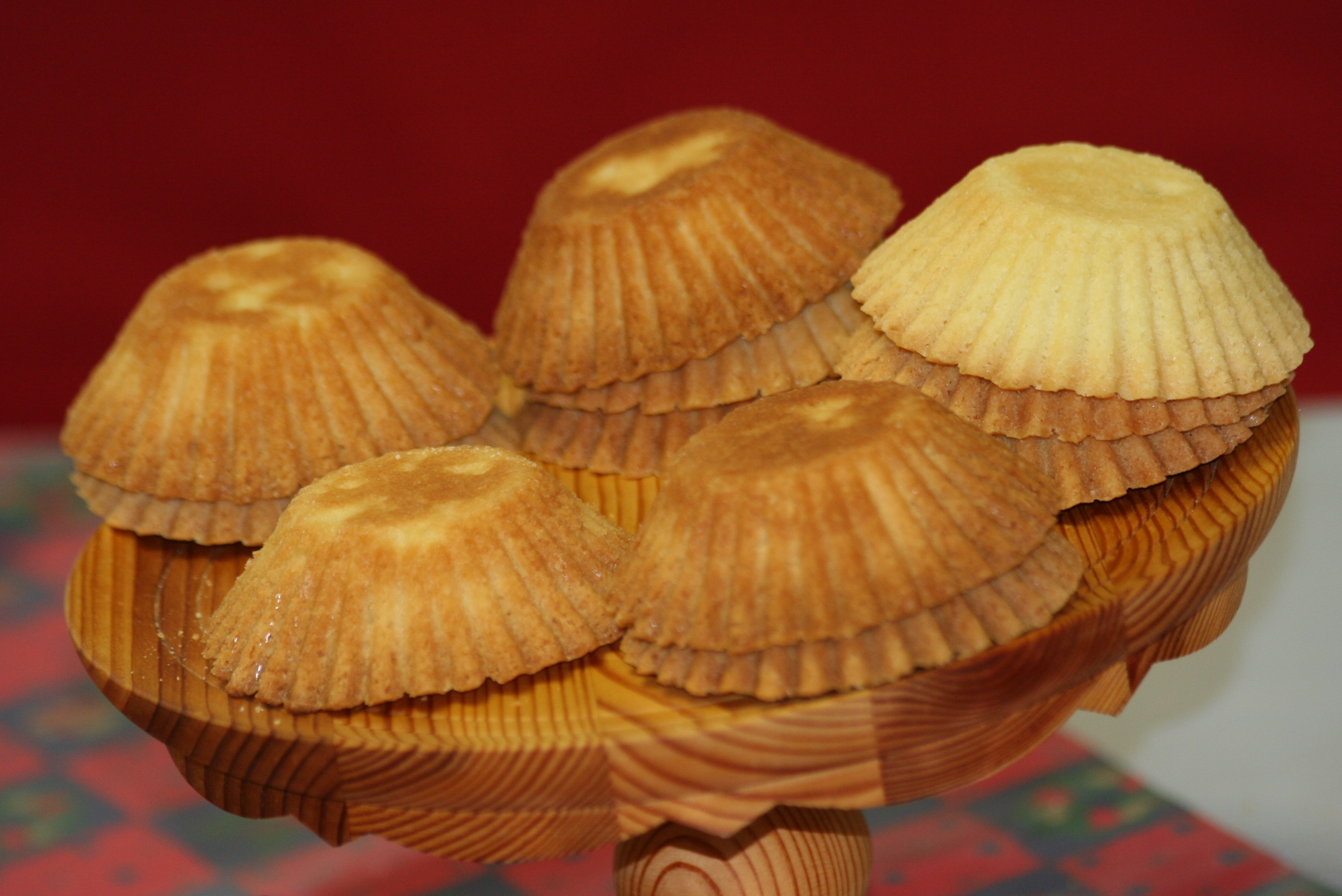
Sandkaker

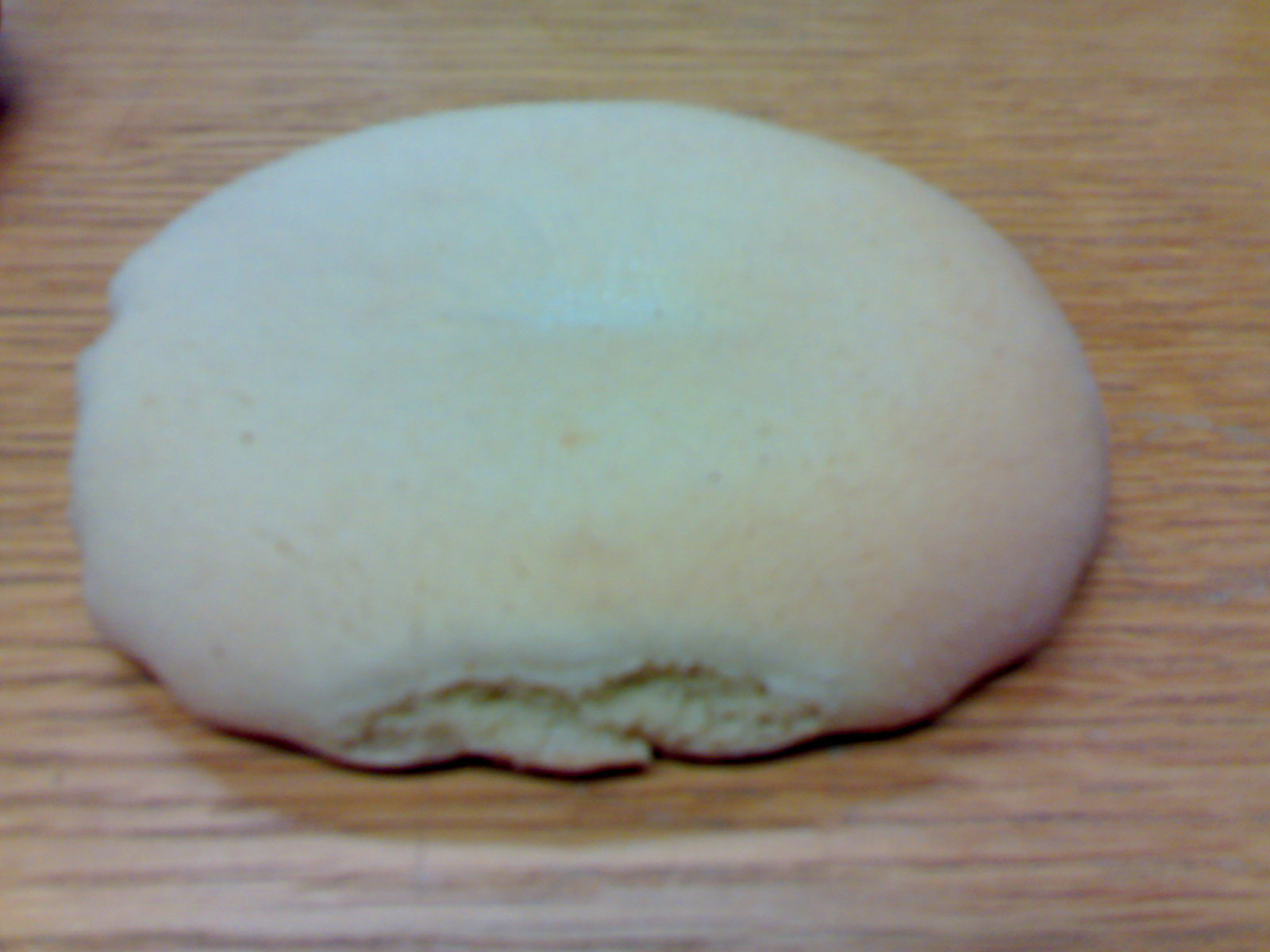
Jødekake

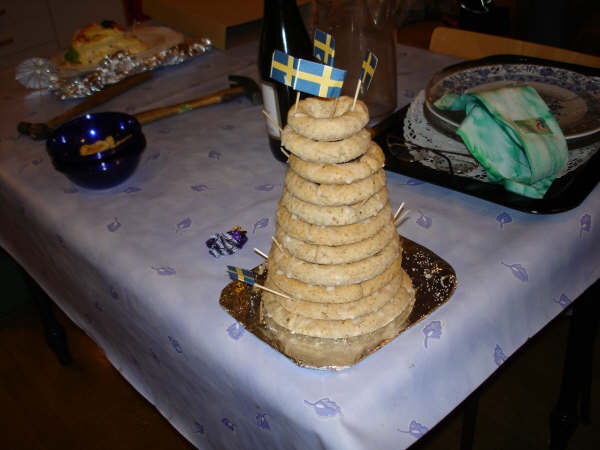
Kransekake

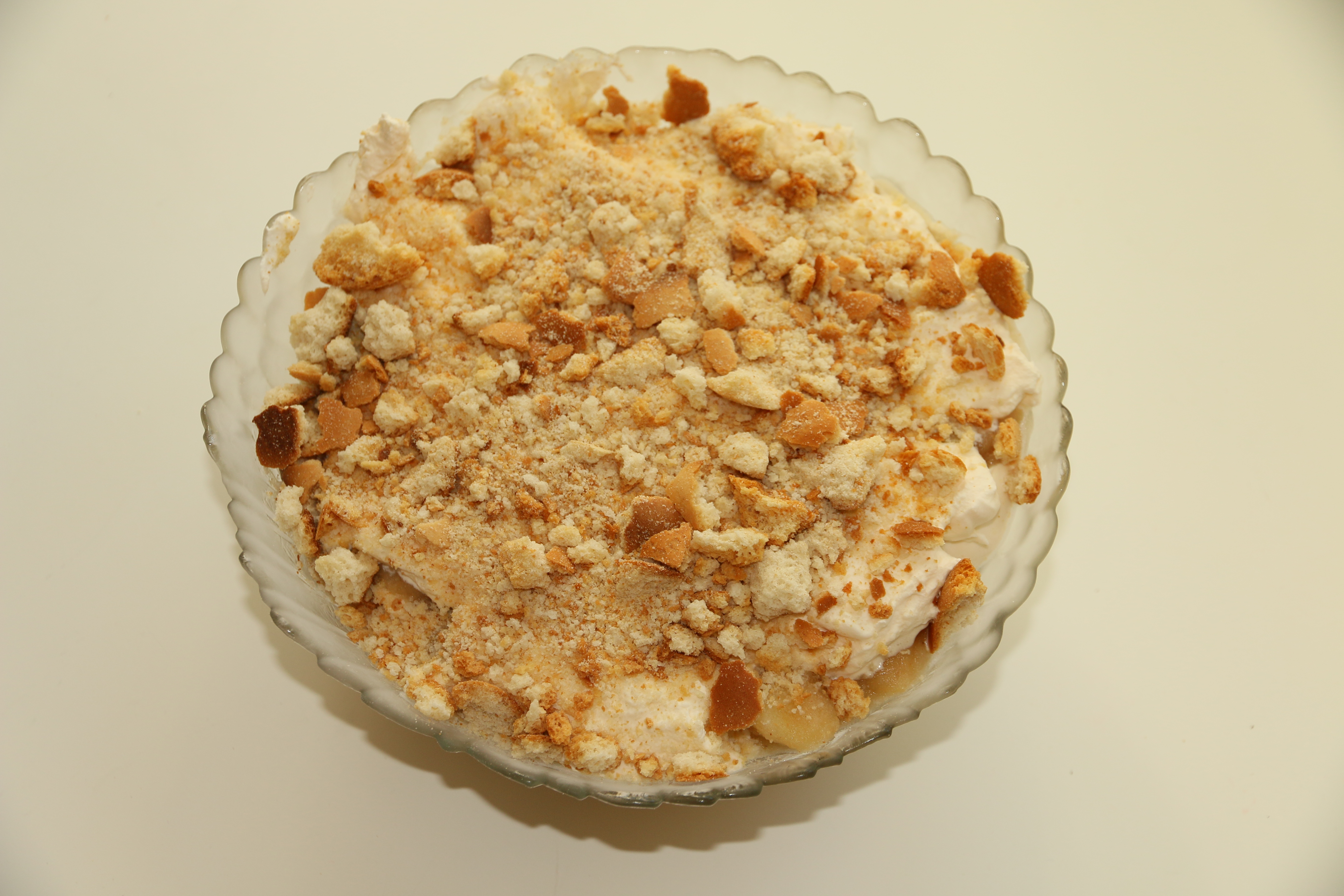
Bondepiker topped with bread crumbs and almond slivers

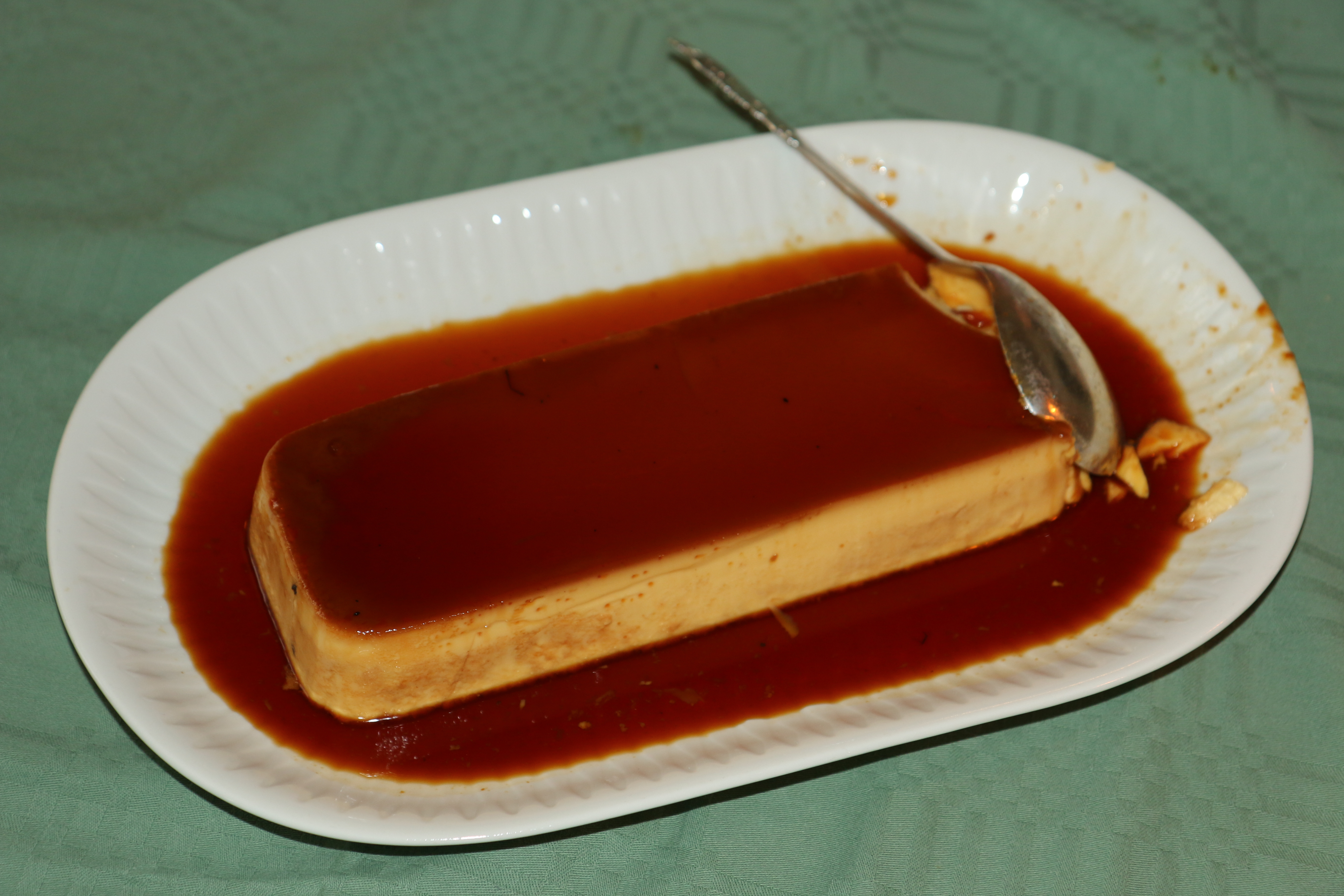
Karamellpudding served in a dish

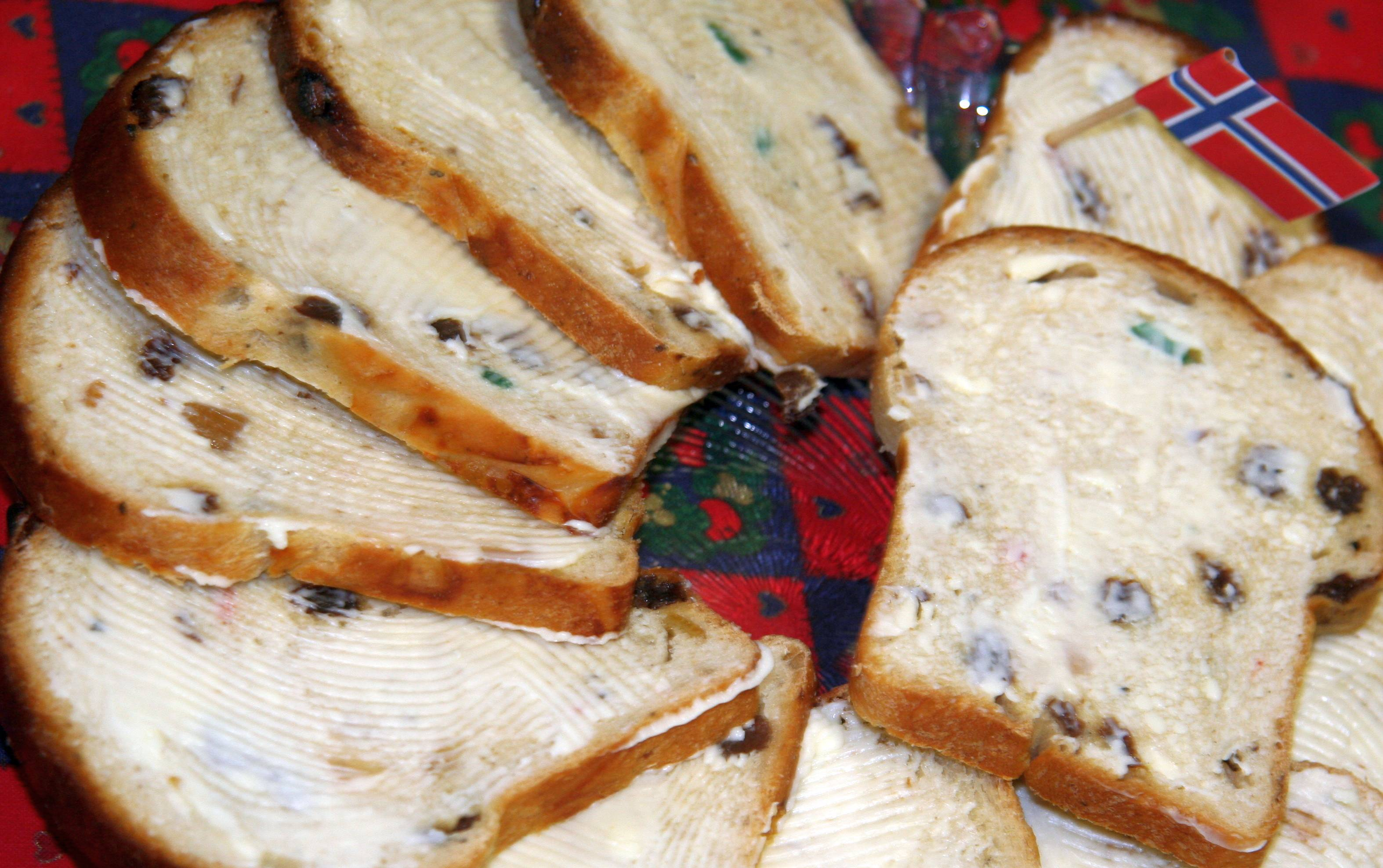
Julebrød with berries

== See also ==
- Norwegian cuisine
- List of Norwegian dishes
- List of desserts
