= Sandbakelse =

Norwegian Christmas cookie

Sandkaker
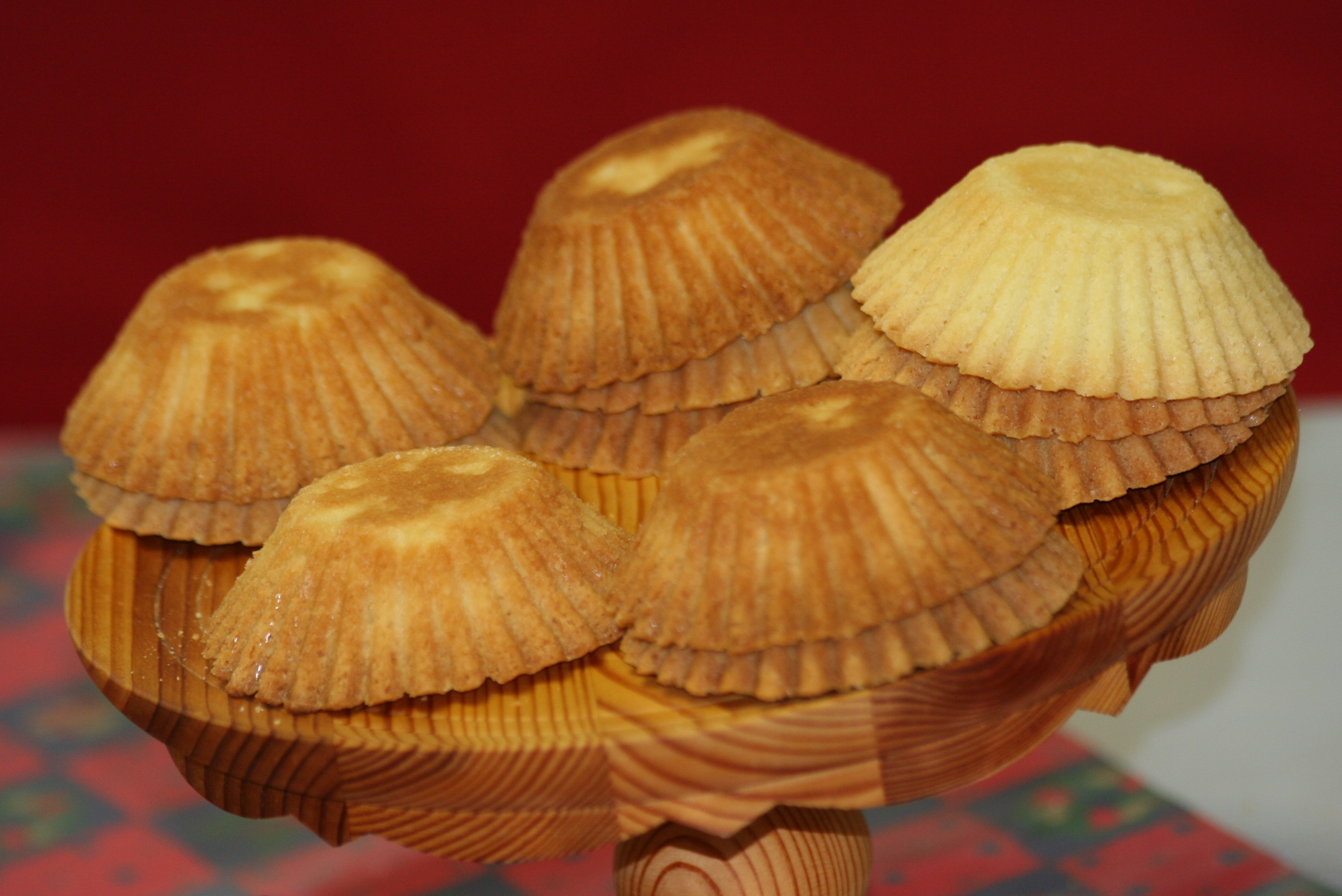
- Stacked sandkaker
- Alternative names: Sandbakkels, sandbakelse, hiekkahentuset (FI)
- Type: Shortbread-style cookie
- Place of origin: Norway, Finland
- Main ingredients: Flour, butter, sugar, and finely chopped almonds

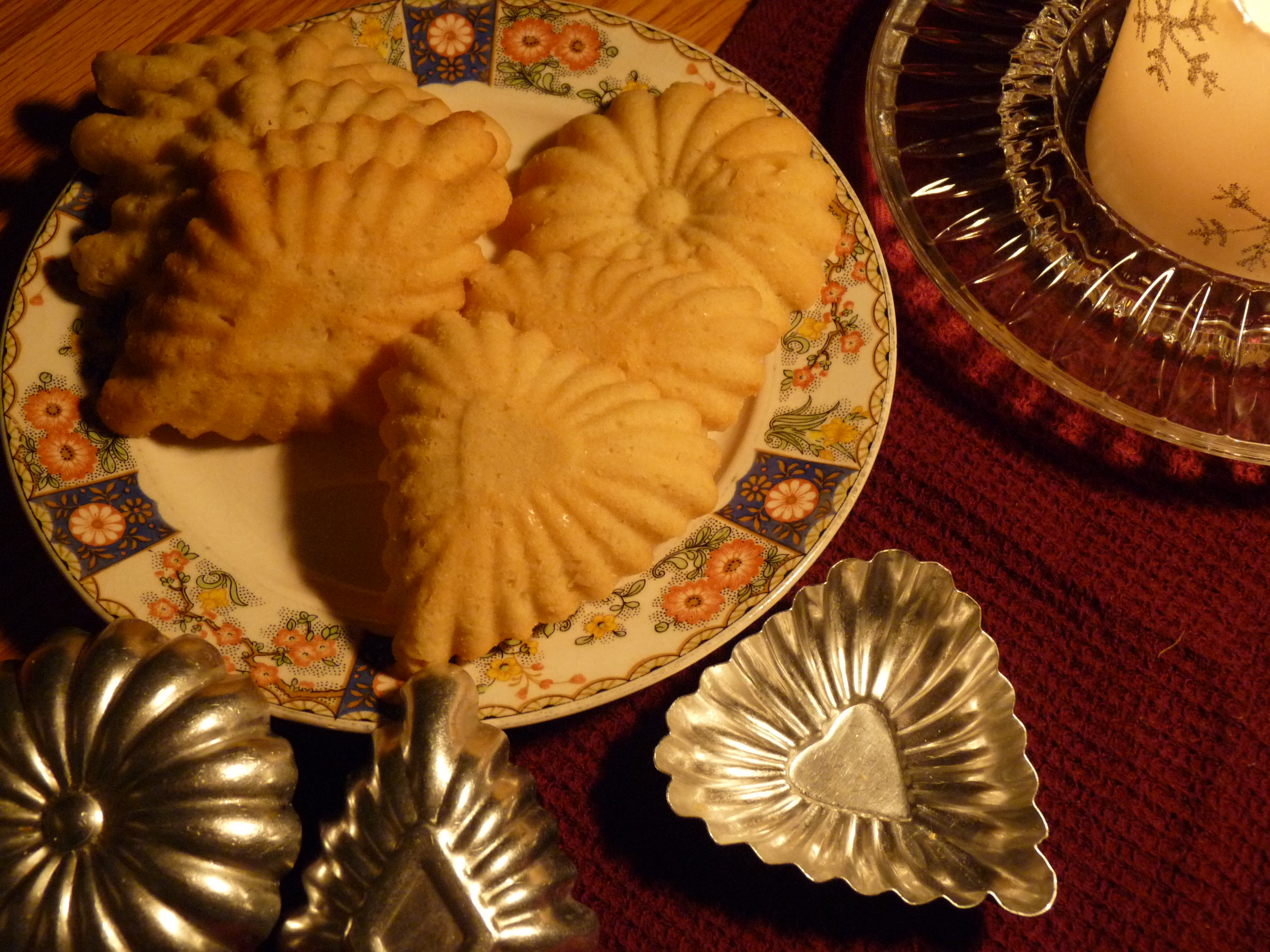
Sandbakelse and their tins

Sandkake, also known as sandbakkels and less commonly sandbakelse, is a Norwegian shortbread-style cookie baked in small fluted molds and traditionally served during Christmas in Norway. In Norway, sandkake is the usual name for the cookie. They are also popular in Finland where they are known as hiekkahentuset.

Sandkaker (plural -r) are made of flour, ground almond, butter, eggs, sugar, and almond extract—possibly with vanilla or rarely cardamom.

After the dough is mixed and cooled, it is pressed into fluted tins. After ten minutes in the oven, the cookies are carefully removed from the hot tins. They may be eaten plain or filled with whipped cream and jam, especially cloudberries.

In 1845 a recipe for sandbakelse appeared in a Norwegian cookbook, but they were not widespread until later in the 19th century. They became popular later than the similar krumkake because sandbakelse required fine flour, which was not yet widely available. Emigrants took their tins and recipes west across the sea, where sandbakelse remain an "old-country" Christmas tradition for many Norwegian-Americans.

== See also ==
- Cuisine of Norway
- List of Norwegian desserts
- Rosette (cookie)
- Krumkake
- Serinakaker
