= Kvæfjord cake =

Norwegian sponge cake baked with meringue, vanilla cream and almonds

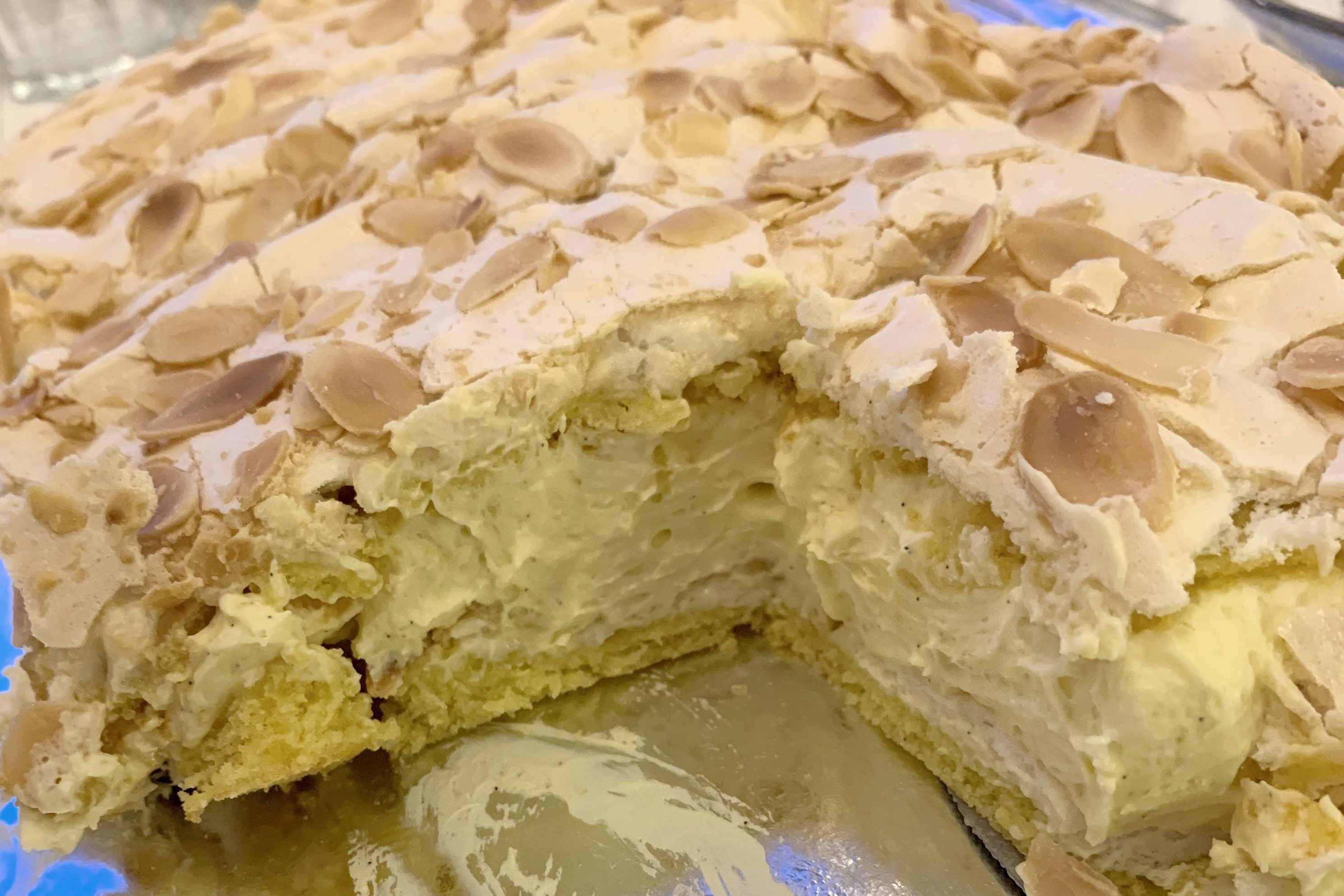
- Alternative names: Kvæfjordkake, verdens beste
- Type: Cake
- Course: Dessert
- Place of origin: Norway
- Region or state: Kvæfjord, Troms
- Created by: Hulda Ottestad
- Main ingredients: meringue, vanilla, almonds
- Food energy (per 100 g serving): 302 kcal (1,260 kJ)

Kvæfjord cake (Norwegian: Kvæfjordkake), or Verdens beste (lit. 'the world's best'), is a sponge cake baked with meringue, vanilla cream, and almonds.

The cake is named for Kvæfjord Municipality in Troms county, Norway. In September 2002, the cake was named Norway's national cake by listeners of Nitimen, a Norwegian entertainment show. Other participants included marzipan cake, carrot cake, kransekake, and chocolate cake.

In Sweden and Finland, the cake is known as Brita cake (Swedish: Britatårta, Finnish: Brita-kakku) after Brita Edland, who popularized the cake through a series of magazine articles. In both countries, the cake is commonly decorated with fresh berries. Other names include Pinocchio cake, manor cake (herrgårdstårta), and summer cake (sommartårta).

== See also ==
- Norwegian cuisine – Culinary traditions of Norway
- List of Norwegian desserts
