= Kanelstenger =

Norwegian cinnamon cookie

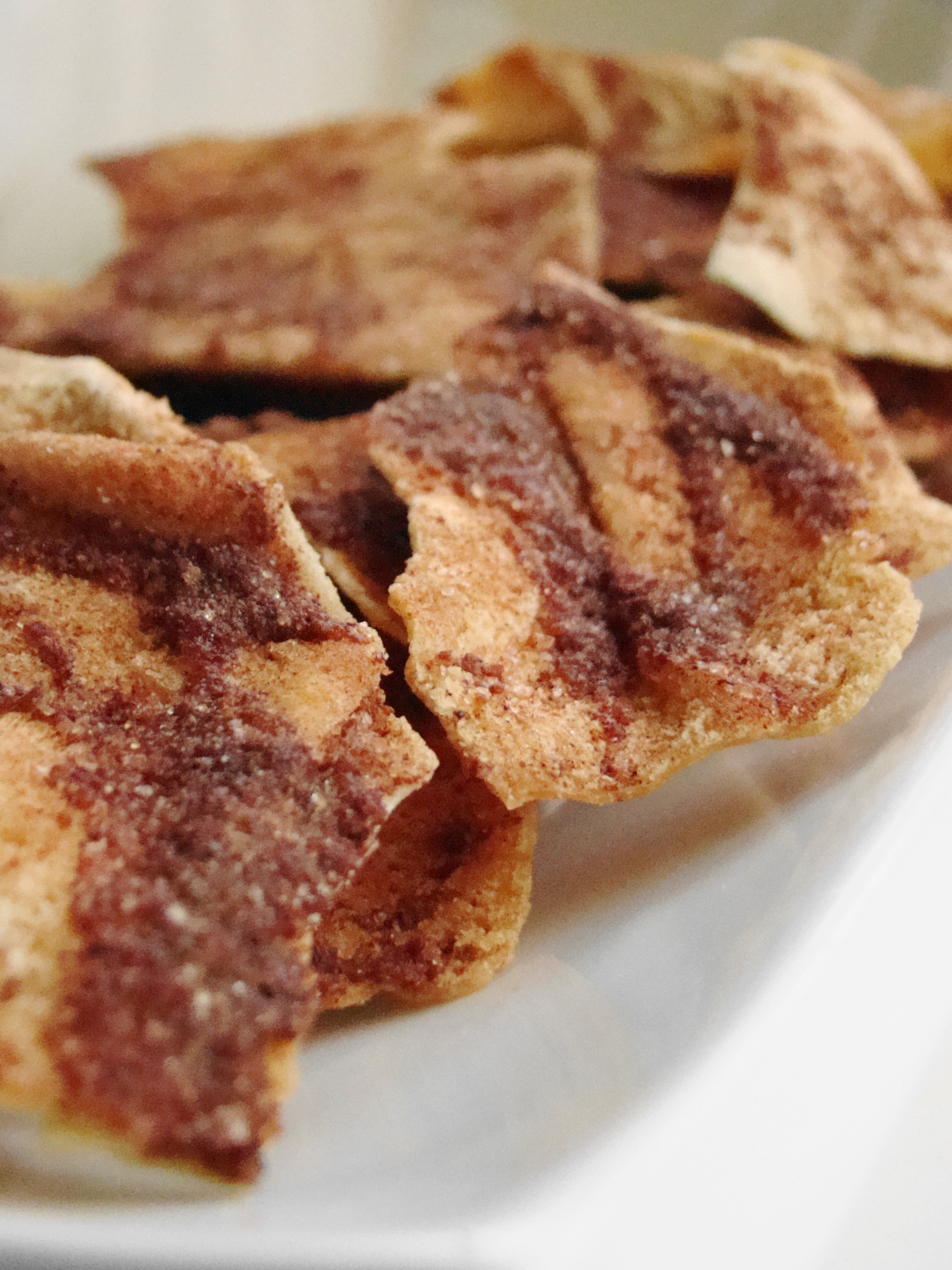
- Closeup of kanelstenger
- Type: Cookie
- Course: Dessert
- Place of origin: Norway
- Main ingredients: Cinnamon
- Ingredients generally used: Flour, sugar, spices

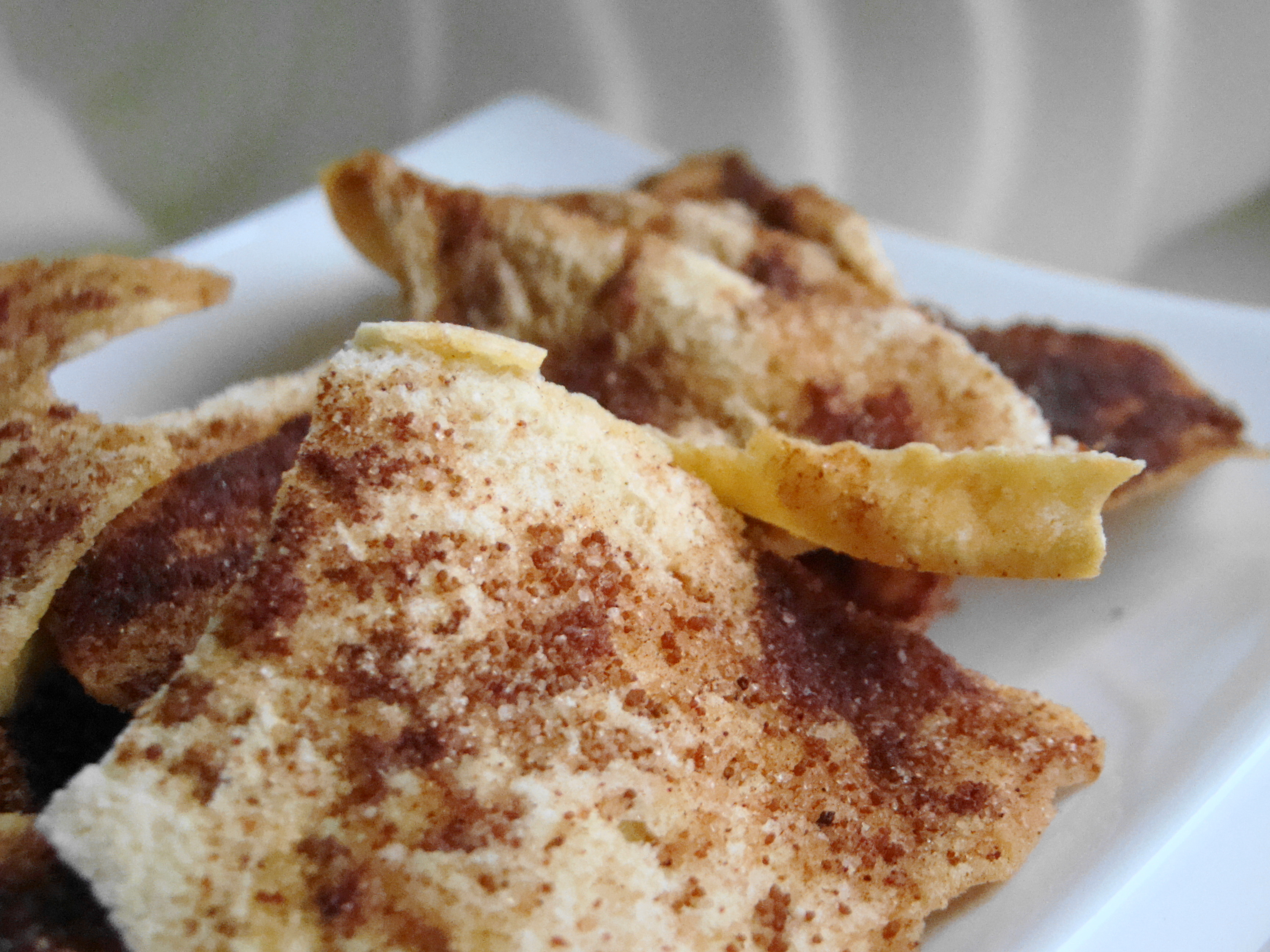
Cinnamon on plate of kanelstenger

Kanelstenger, or brune pinner, is a Norwegian cookie coated in cinnamon, syrup, and chopped almonds frequently served during Christmastime. It is characterized by its crispy texture and flat, stick shape, typically served in bundles.

== See also ==
- List of Norwegian desserts
- Norwegian cuisine
