= Fyrstekake =

Norwegian cake

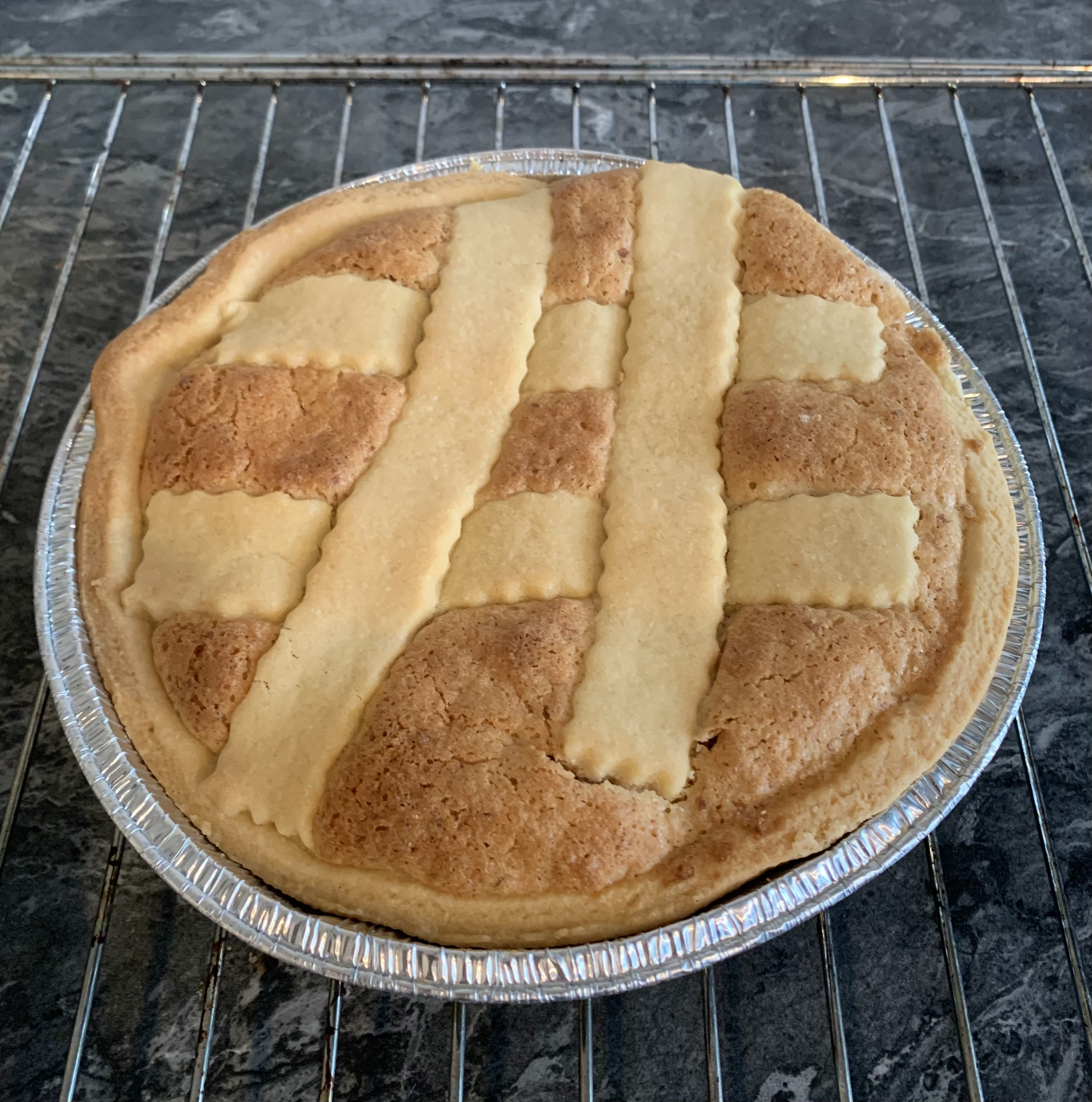
- Freshly baked fyrstekake
- Type: Cake
- Course: Dessert
- Place of origin: Norway
- Main ingredients: Almond filling
- Ingredients generally used: Rum, almond flour, powdered sugar

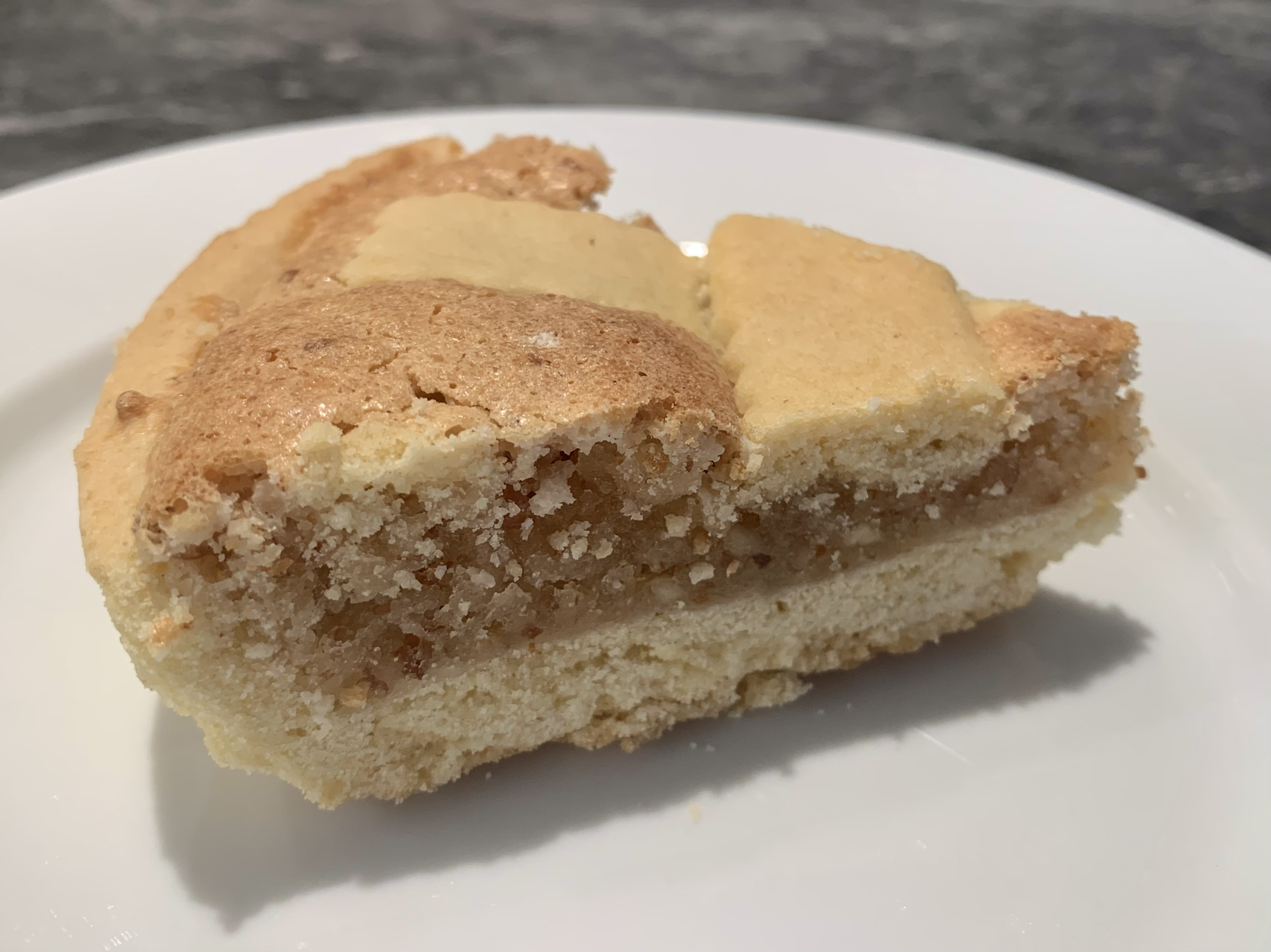
Sliced fyrstekake

Fyrstekake or prince's cake is a Norwegian cake consisting of shortcrust pastry, almond filling or marzipan, rum, powdered sugar, butter, cardamom, cinnamon, and eggs. It typically has a signature lattice pattern on top and a decadent, moist filling. It is occasionally topped with whipped cream and served during Christmas, along with coffee or tea.

== History ==
Fyrstekake was developed by a confectioner in Trondheim in 1856 and has been a staple in Norwegian bakeries ever since.

== See also ==
- List of Norwegian desserts
- Norwegian cuisine
