= Krumkake =

Norwegian cone-shaped cookie

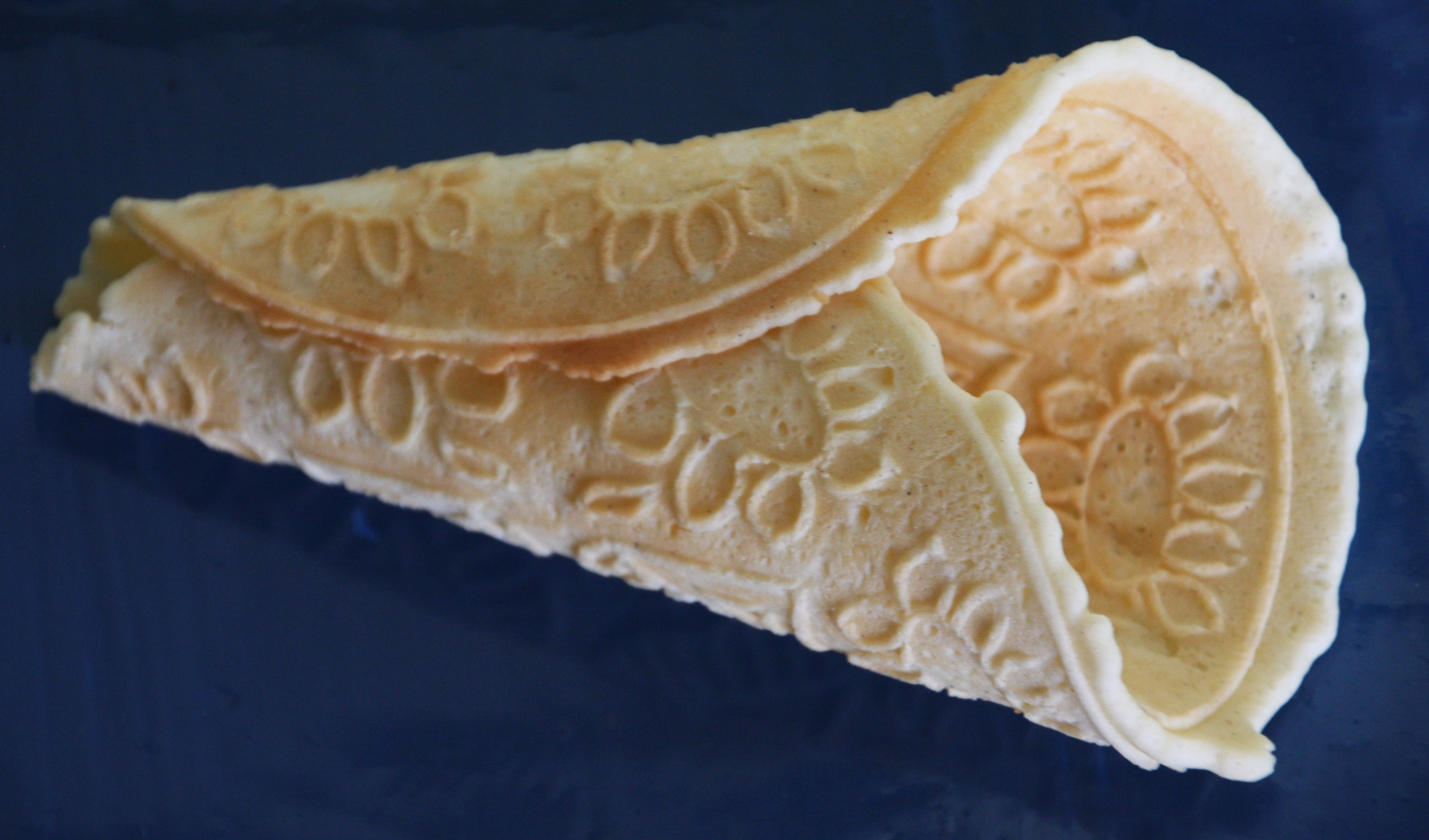
- Type: Biscuit
- Place of origin: Norway
- Main ingredients: Flour, butter, eggs, sugar,

Krumkake (Norwegian: [ˈkrʊ̀mˌkɑːkə]; meaning 'curved cake'; pl.: krumkaker) is a Norwegian cookie made of flour, butter, eggs, and sugar.

A special decorative two-sided iron griddle similar to a waffle iron is traditionally used to bake the thin round cakes, similar to Italian pizzelle and cannoli. Older irons are used over the stove, but modern electric irons offer the convenience of nonstick surfaces, automatic timing, and multiple cakes per batch. While hot, the 13–20 cm (5.1–7.9 in) krumkaker are rolled into small cones around a wooden or plastic cone form. Krumkaker can be eaten plain or filled with whipped cream (often multekrem) or other fillings.

These biscuits are popular not only in Norway but due to contributions of Norwegian immigrants and their descendants they are found in the cuisines of New England and the American Midwest. Krumkaker are traditionally made in preparation for Christmas, along with other cookies of Nordic origin including sandbakelse and rosettes. They offer a sweet dessert after the traditional Christmas Eve dinner.

In Germany, the cookies are commonly filled with sweet stuffings. They are also used as a type of ice cream cone.

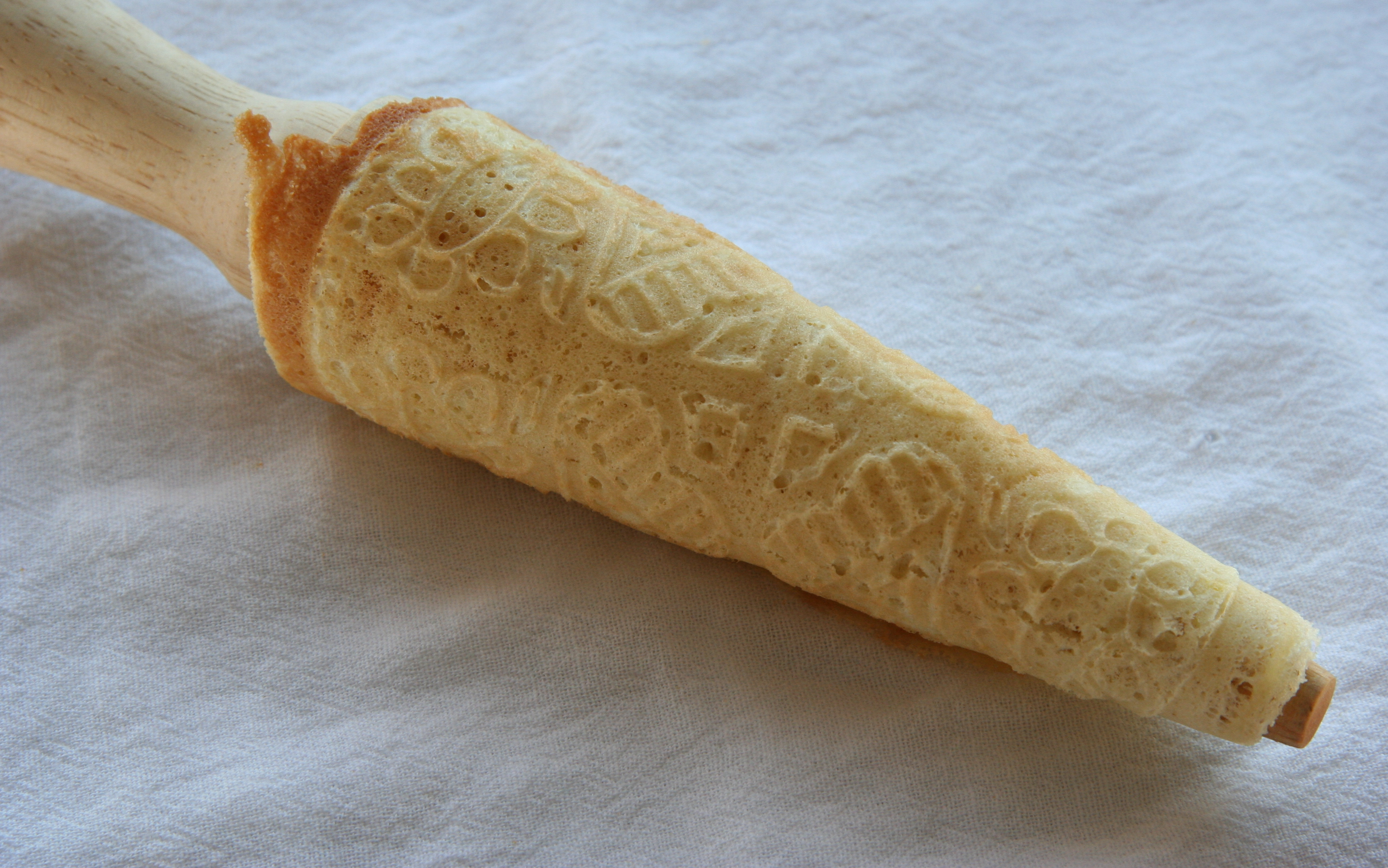
Krumkake just off the hot iron, being shaped on a conical rolling pin

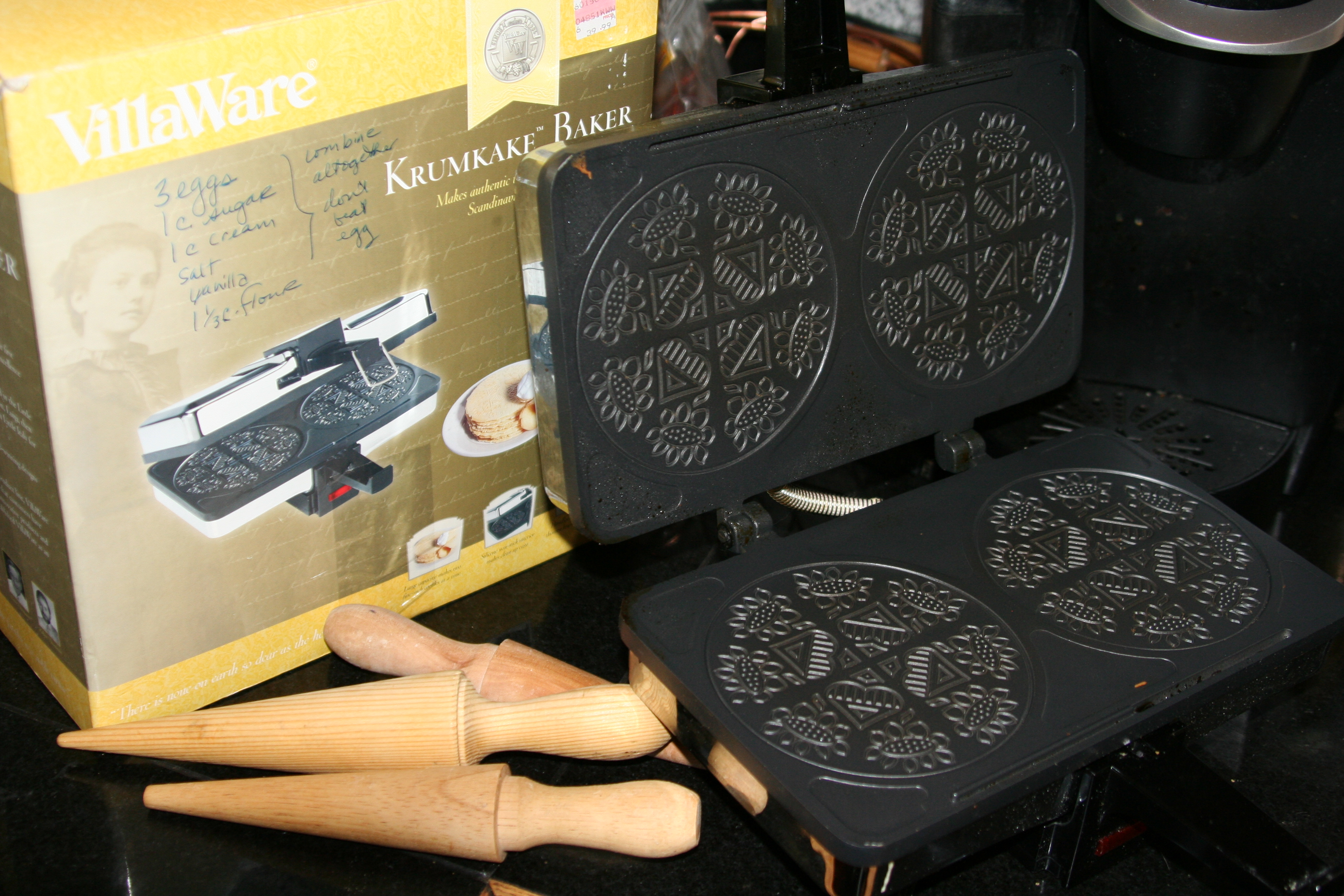
Electric krumkake iron and wooden krumkake rollers

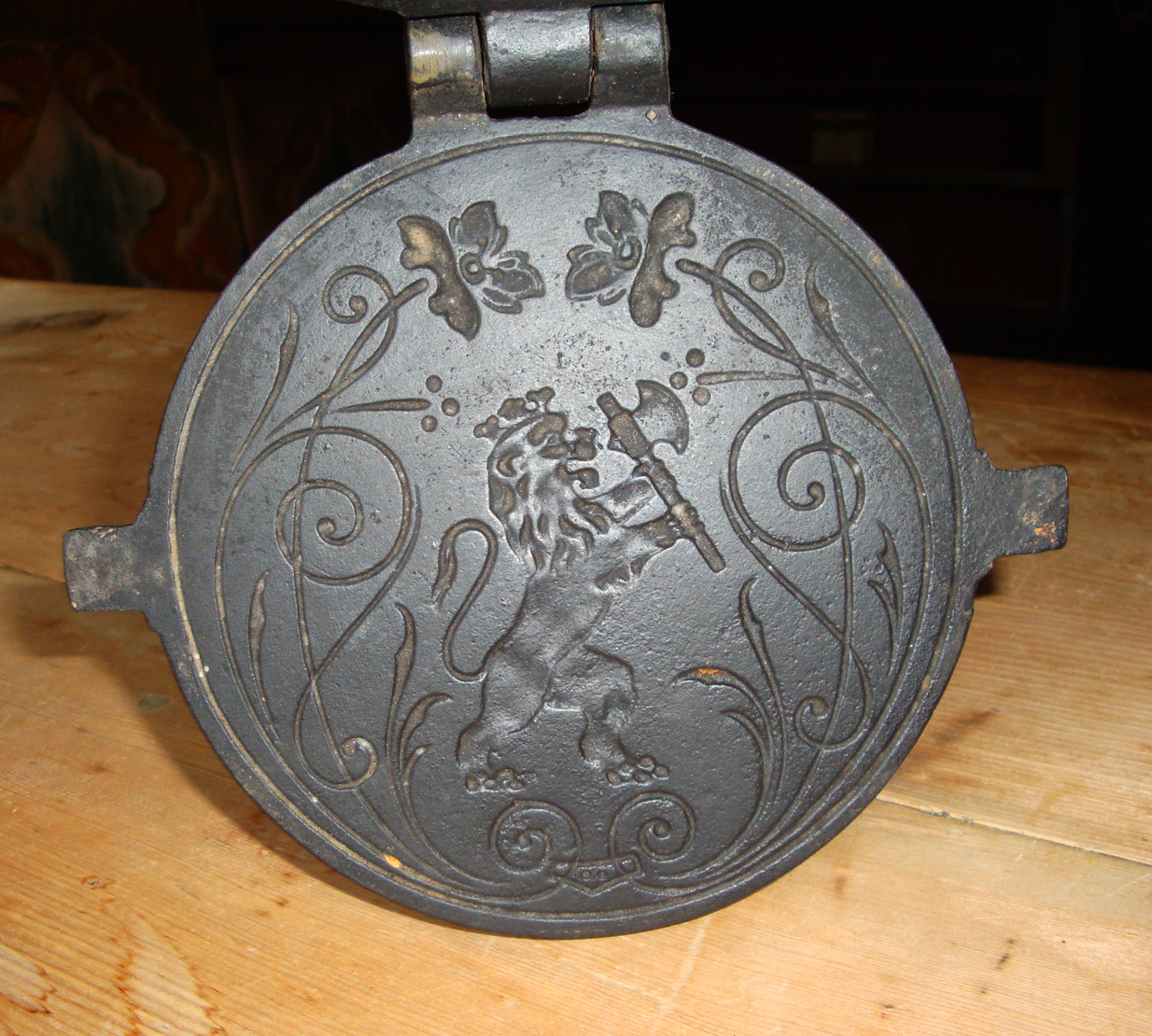
19th century krumkake iron decorated with national coat of arms

Videoclip: baking a krumkake

== See also ==
- List of Norwegian desserts
