= Queen Maud fromage =

Norwegian dessert

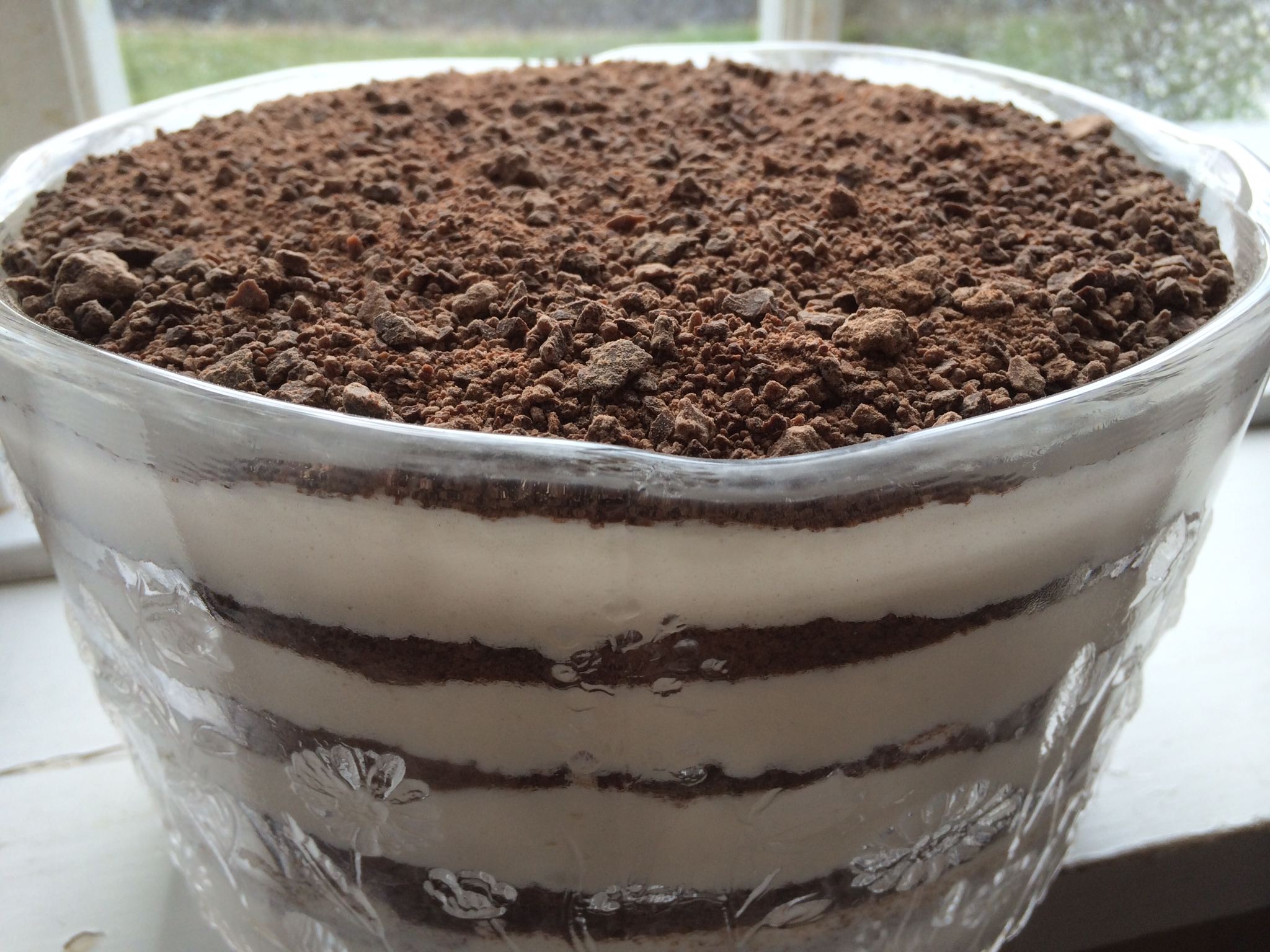
Queen Maud fromage

Queen Maud fromage or Queen Maud Pudding (Norwegian: Dronning Mauds pudding; also called Haugesund Dessert) is a traditional Norwegian dessert consisting of whipped cream, egg yolks, sugar, gelatin, and grated chocolate. It was created in the early 20th century and named in honour of Maud of Wales, who became queen consort of Norway in 1905 following the dissolution of the Union between Sweden and Norway; The dessert was presented to Queen Maud and King Haakon during their coronation expedition in 1906. The dessert is particularly associated with western Norway, where it is traditionally served at Christmas celebrations, weddings, confirmations, and other festive occasions. Although similar in texture to a mousse, Queen Maud fromage is set with gelatin, giving it a firmer consistency. It remains a popular and culturally significant dish in Norwegian cuisine, commonly served at Christmas celebrations, weddings, and other festive occasions.

== History ==
Queen Maud fromage is believed to have originated in the early 20th century, shortly after Maud of Wales became queen of Norway in 1905. According to culinary tradition, the dessert was first prepared in honour of the queen during one of her visits to western Norway. It is often associated particularly with the city of Haugesund, where local accounts state that it was served to the royal couple at a civic or private function. Over time, the dessert gained popularity in western Norway, especially in the region of Vestlandet. While originally linked to royal visits and formal occasions, it gradually became incorporated into local festive traditions. By the mid-20th century, Queen Maud fromage had become a customary dish at Christmas celebrations, weddings, and confirmations in parts of western Norway. Although widely accepted as a regional specialty, details regarding its precise origin and first documented preparation remain uncertain, and accounts vary among local traditions.

== Ingredients and preparation ==
Queen Maud fromage is typically made from egg yolks, sugar, whipped cream, gelatin, and grated dark chocolate. The egg yolks and sugar are beaten together until pale and thick, after which dissolved gelatin is incorporated to provide structure. Whipped cream is then folded gently into the mixture to create a light, airy texture. The dessert is usually assembled in a glass bowl or serving dish in alternating layers of cream mixture and finely grated chocolate, although in some variations the chocolate is folded throughout. Once assembled, the fromage is refrigerated until set. The use of gelatin gives the dessert a firmer consistency than a mousse, while retaining a smooth and delicate texture. The proportion of chocolate varies, and some modern versions include additional flavourings such as vanilla. Despite minor variations, the essential components—cream, egg yolks, gelatin, and chocolate—remain consistent across most traditional preparations.

== Cultural significance ==
Queen Maud fromage holds a particularly strong association with western Norway, where it is regarded as a traditional festive dessert. It is commonly served during Christmas celebrations and at major family occasions such as weddings and confirmations. In some communities, especially along the western coast, the dish has become a customary part of holiday meals.

== See also ==
- List of Norwegian desserts
