= Svele =

Norwegian food similar to pancakes

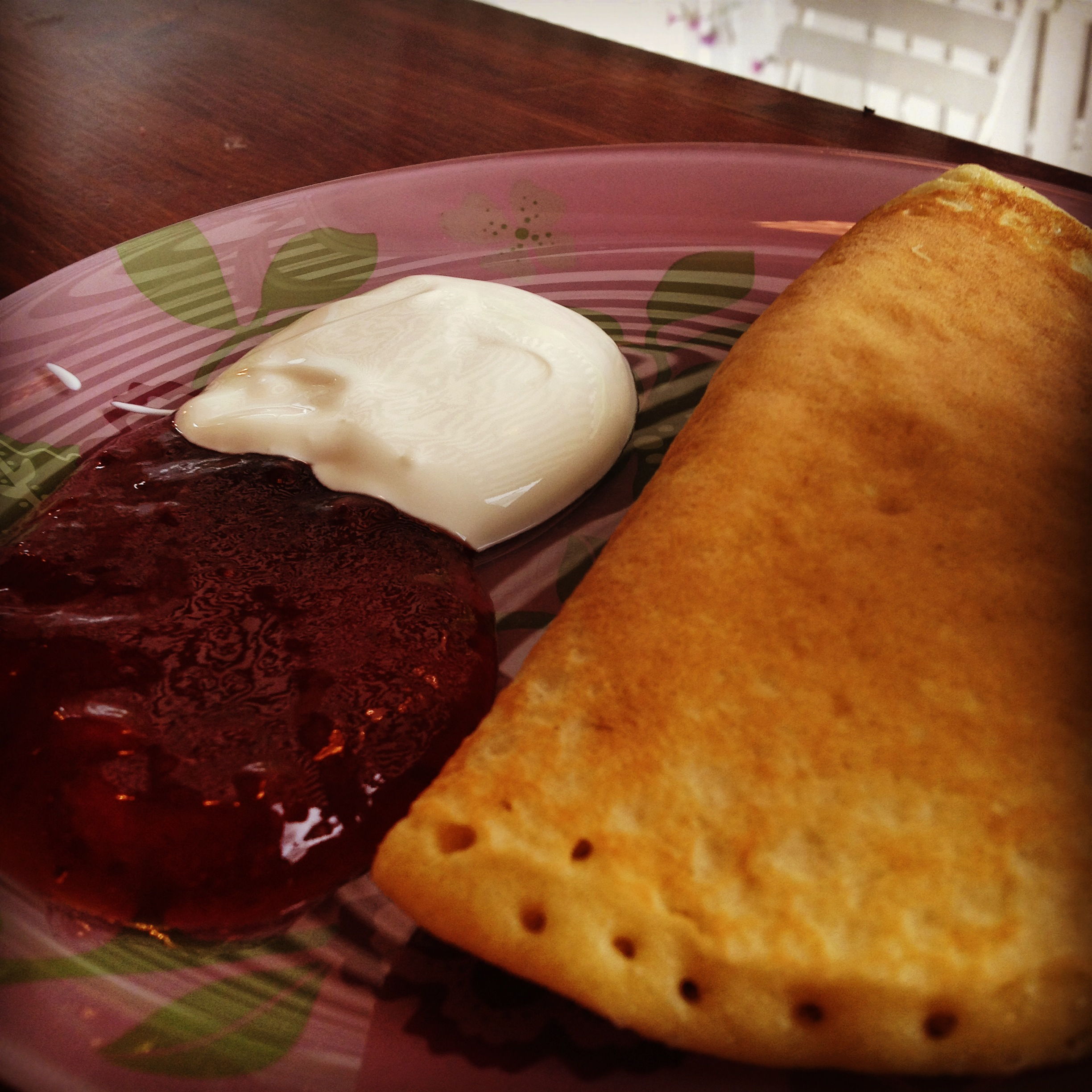
Svele with jam and sour cream

Svele (plural: sveler (indefinite), svelene (definite)), also known as lapp (plural: lapper), is a Norwegian batter-based cake. By size and texture they may bear some resemblance to American pancakes, but are usually eaten for afternoon coffee or as a snack between meals, served with butter and either sugar or brunost, folded in half to the shape of a crescent. Baking soda and salt of hartshorn are used as rising agent in svele, which give this cake its characteristic flavour. Recipes may differ slightly according to region or to house recipes, but usually include egg, sugar, kefir, wheat flour, and butter in addition to the above-mentioned rising agents. The svele is fried on a griddle or in a lightly buttered frying pan.

The svele is typical to the Møre og Romsdal region where since 1971 sveler have been served on board the ferries that connect communities across fjords and on islands. This tradition has spread throughout Western Norway, where svele is largely associated with ferry travels.

== See also ==
- List of Norwegian desserts
