= Multekrem =

Norwegian dessert

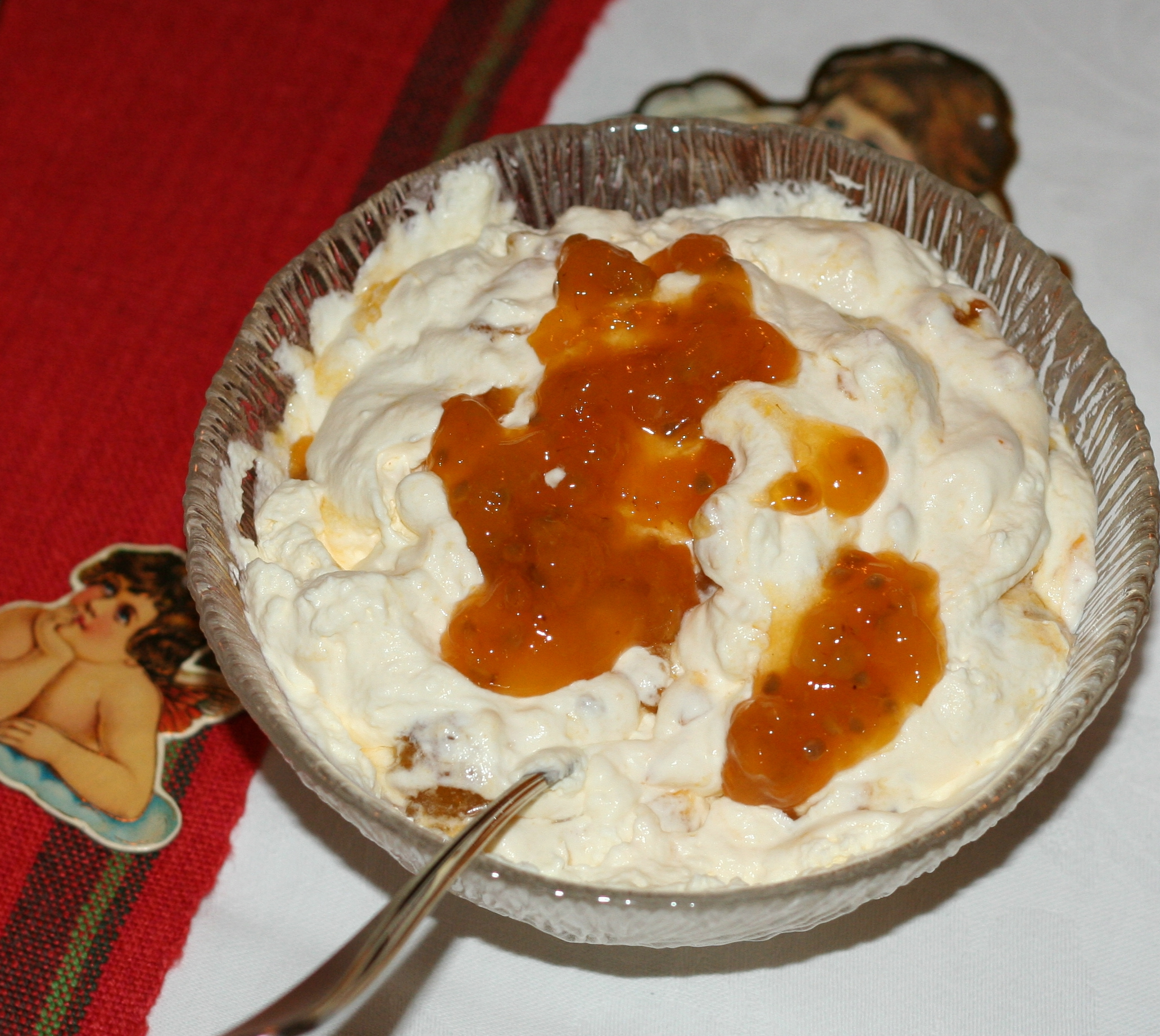
- Type: Dessert
- Place of origin: Norway
- Main ingredients: Cloudberries, whipped cream, sugar

Multekrem is a traditional Norwegian dessert made by mixing cloudberries with whipped cream and sugar.

The cloudberries can be served as-is or heated. It is common to serve the multekrem with krumkake or kransekake. Multekrem is also a traditional Norwegian Christmas dinner dessert.

== See also ==
- List of Norwegian desserts
