= Saftsuppe =

Juice soup

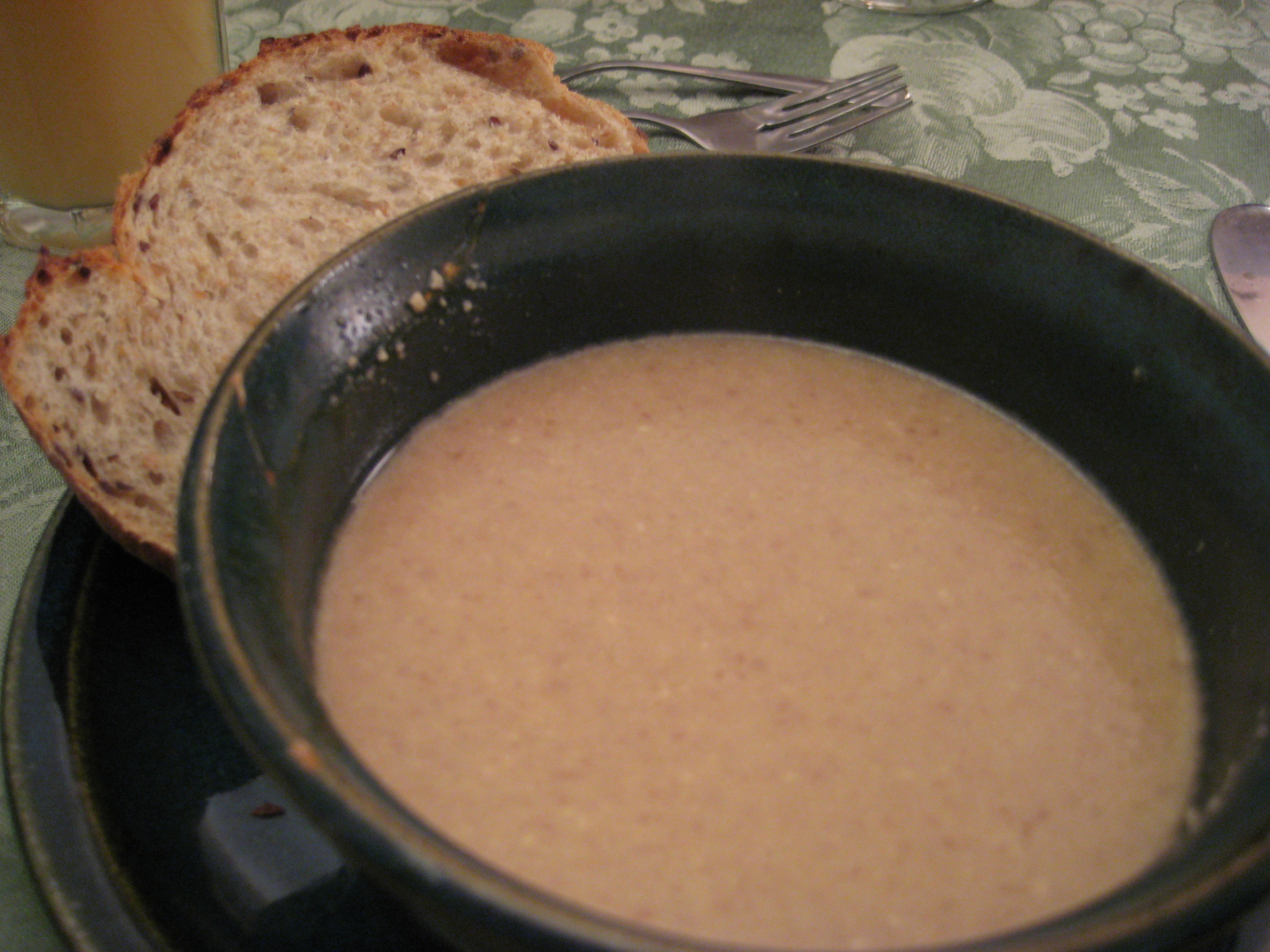
- Saftsuppe made with walnuts and pineapple juice
- Type: Soup
- Course: Dessert
- Place of origin: Norway
- Main ingredients: Juice
- Ingredients generally used: Corn starch, raisins, dried fruit

Saftsuppe or sago groat soup is a dessert soup made from various juices, water, and a thickening agent, usually either potato flour or cornstarch. Dried fruit such as raisins or sago groats are added as well. It is frequently served with pancakes or vanilla ice cream. It can be made from a variety of juices, such as blueberry juice, pineapple juice, and currant juice.

== History ==
In Scouting circles, it is known as Gasmann soup, being named after scout leader and pastor Hans Møller Gasmann.

== See also ==
- List of Norwegian desserts
