= Serinakaker =

Norwegian butter cookie

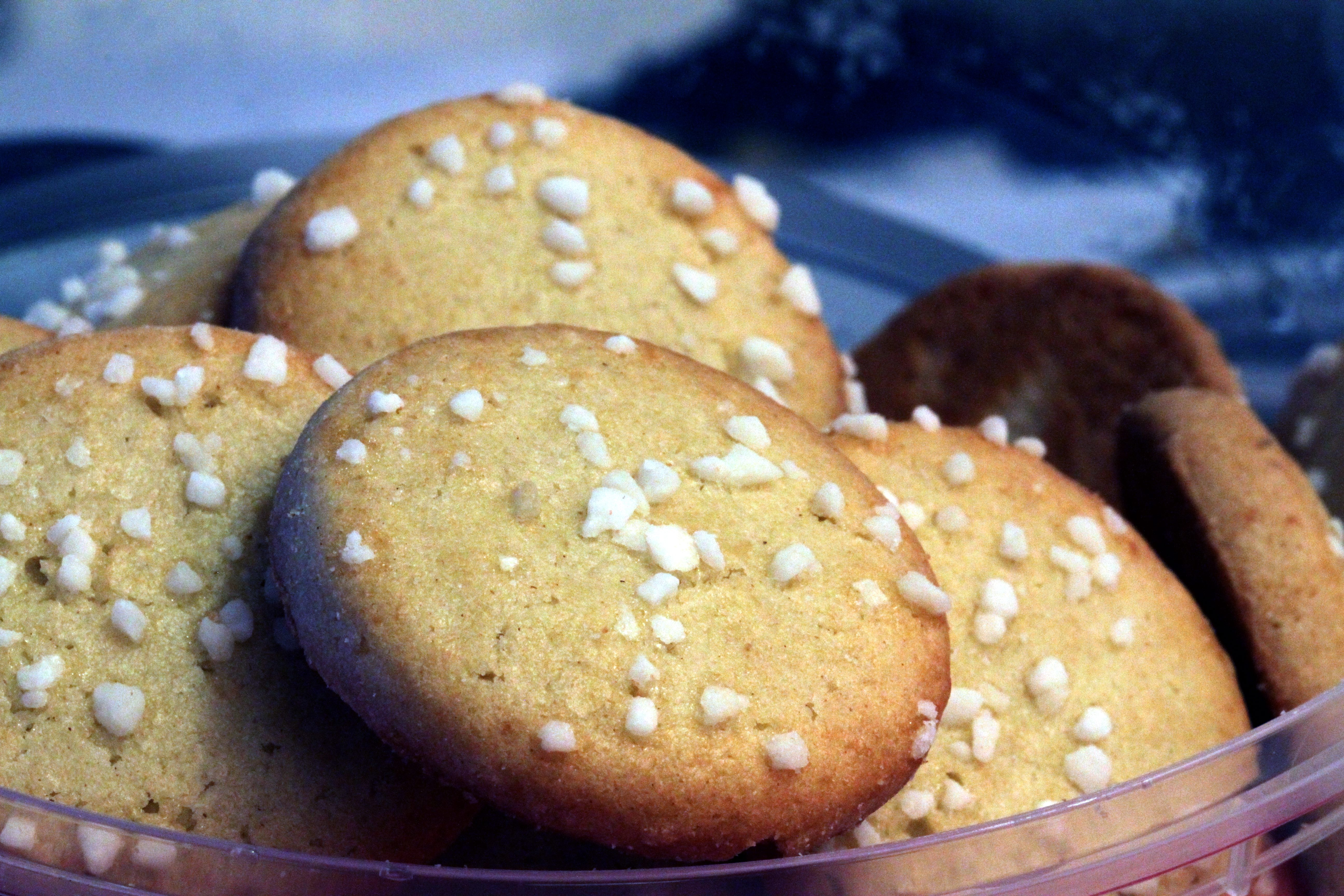
- Plate of serinakaker
- Type: Cookie
- Course: Dessert
- Place of origin: Norway
- Main ingredients: Butter
- Ingredients generally used: Granulated sugar, flour, pearl sugar

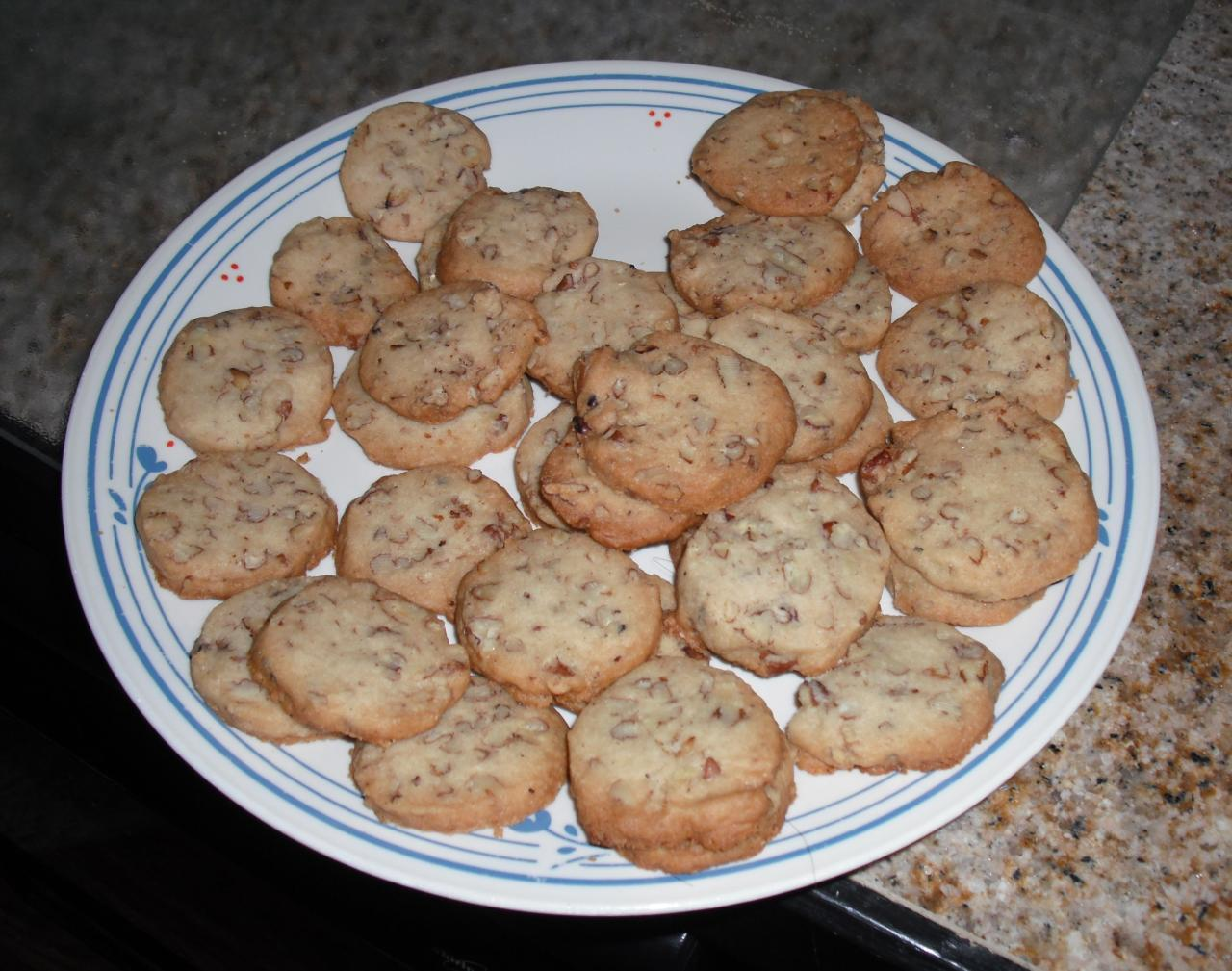
Serinakaker with pecans

Serinakaker is a Norwegian butter cookie made with flour, granulated sugar, eggs, and topped with pearl sugar. They have a similar texture to shortbread and are served around Christmastime. Occasionally, they are topped with slivered almonds or various nuts.

== History ==
The first incarnation of serinakaker was in a household management text by Hanna Winsnes from 1845 called “Textbook in the various branches of the household”. Serinakaker have been prevalent in Norway, since before the introduction of the oven, being originally prepared using a hot iron.

While the origin of the name is still debated, the common theory is that it was named after a woman named Serena, who would bake them frequently.

== See also ==
- List of Norwegian desserts
- Norwegian cuisine
