= Marsipankake =

Norwegian marzipan cake

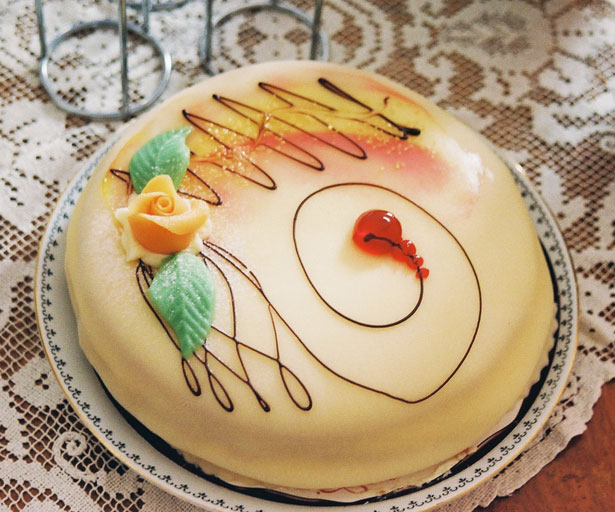
- Marsipankake filled with vanilla cream and strawberry jam
- Type: Cake
- Course: Dessert
- Place of origin: Norway
- Main ingredients: Marzipan
- Ingredients generally used: Sponge cake, vanilla cream, raspberry jam

Marsipankake (Norwegian, "marzipan cake"), also known as marzipan princess cake or hvit dame ("white lady"), is a dessert from Norway featuring layers of sponge cake, vanilla cream, various puddings, jams, and other additives before being topped in a layer of marzipan.

== History ==
The name of the cake was coined by the German Kaiser Wilhelm II on a trip to Bergen. During his visits, he would be served marsipankake, in which he would respond with, "Ah, nochmal die weisse Dame," or, "Ah, again the white lady." While originating in Bergen, the cake has since found its way to bakeries across Norway and other Scandinavian regions.

== See also ==
- List of Norwegian desserts
- Norwegian cuisine
