= Havreflarn =

Norwegian oatmeal cookies

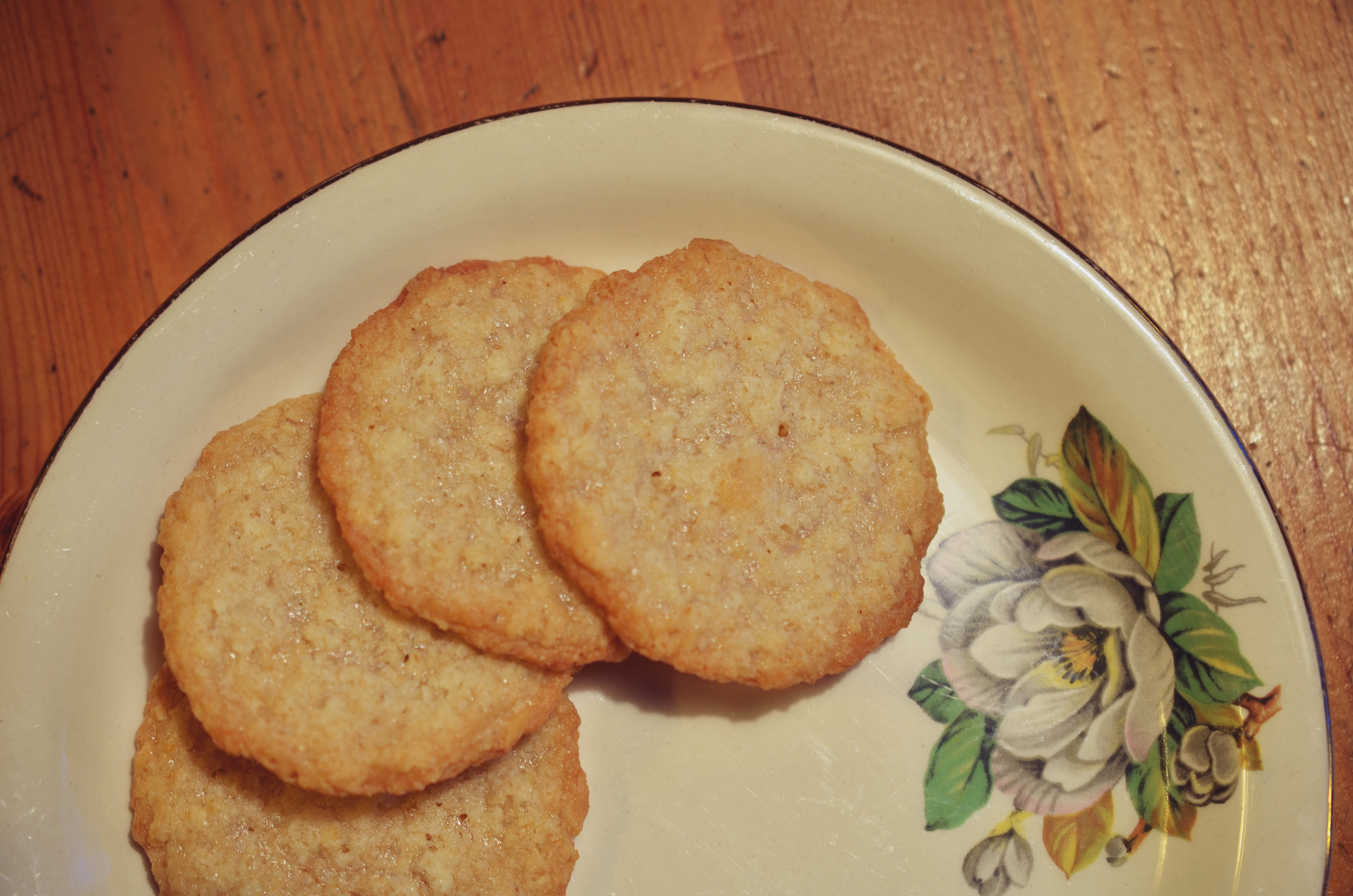
- Plate of Havreflarn
- Type: Cookie
- Course: Dessert
- Place of origin: Norway
- Main ingredients: Oats
- Ingredients generally used: Butter, flour, brown sugar
- Food energy (per 100 g serving): 100kcal
Nutritional value
(per 100 g serving)
- Protein: 1g g
- Fat: 6g g
- Carbohydrate: 11g g
- Similar dishes: Oatmeal raisin cookies

Havreflarn, or havrekakor in Sweden, are Nordic oatmeal cookies with a brittle, crisp texture. They are traditionally made all the way from Denmark to Finland. It is prepared traditionally with rolled oats, brown sugar, flour, and various spices, such as cinnamon and nutmeg.

Occasionally, they are topped with a chocolate drizzle for added flavor. They can also be sandwiched together with a thin layer of chocolate between them; in Norway, this version is often called sjokoladeflarn (chocolate flarn).

== Recipes ==
- True North Kitchen
- A Kitchen Hoor's Adventure
- Sons of Norway
