= Trollkrem =

Norwegian dessert

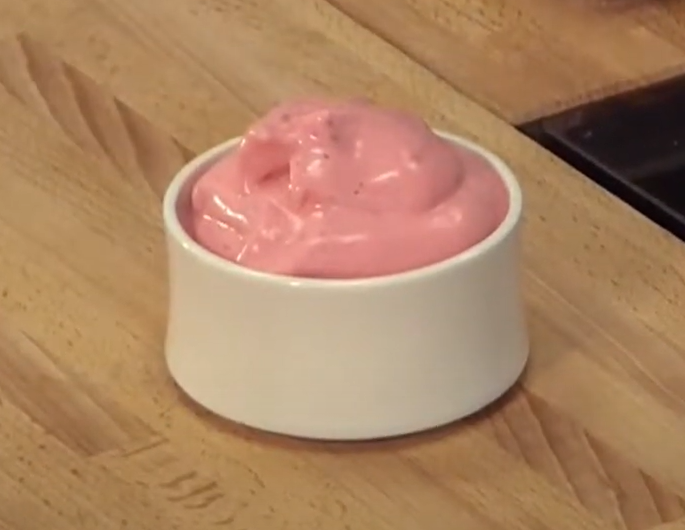
- Type: Mousse
- Course: Dessert
- Associated cuisine: Norway
- Main ingredients: Lingonberry

Trollkrem is a Norwegian mousse primarily made from lingonberries. Mainly served for dessert, its name means "troll cream" in Norwegian due to the berries also being known as "troll berries" because they inhabit the mountains. It consists of lingonberries, sugar, whipped egg whites, and a small amount of vanilla. It is sometimes served with custard and is a common dessert in the fall when lingonberries are in season. It is also popular during celebrations of the New Year.
