= Lefse =

Traditional Norwegian flatbread

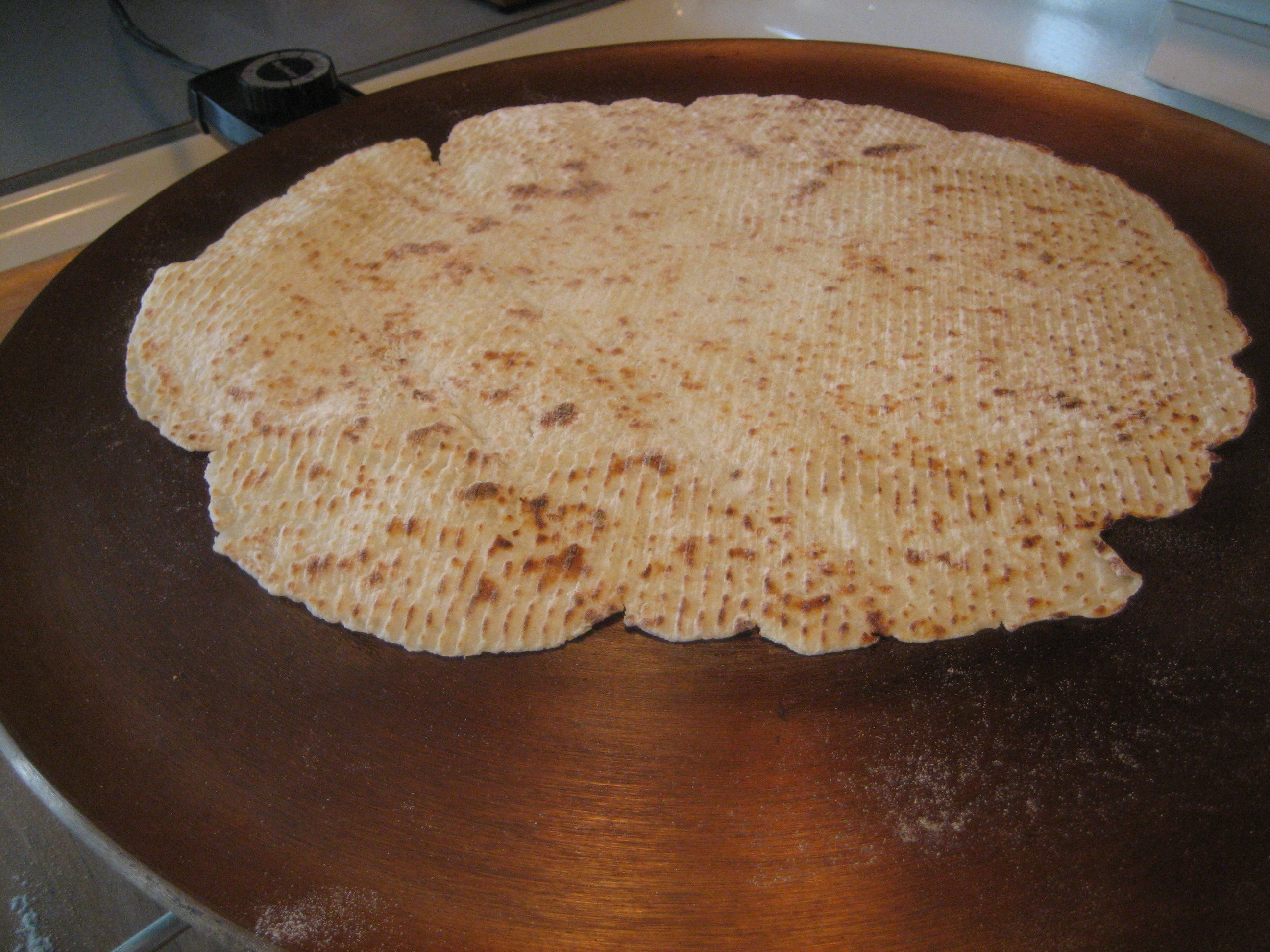
- Lefse on a griddle
- Type: Flatbread
- Place of origin: Norway
- Main ingredients: Flour with or without potatoes; milk or cream

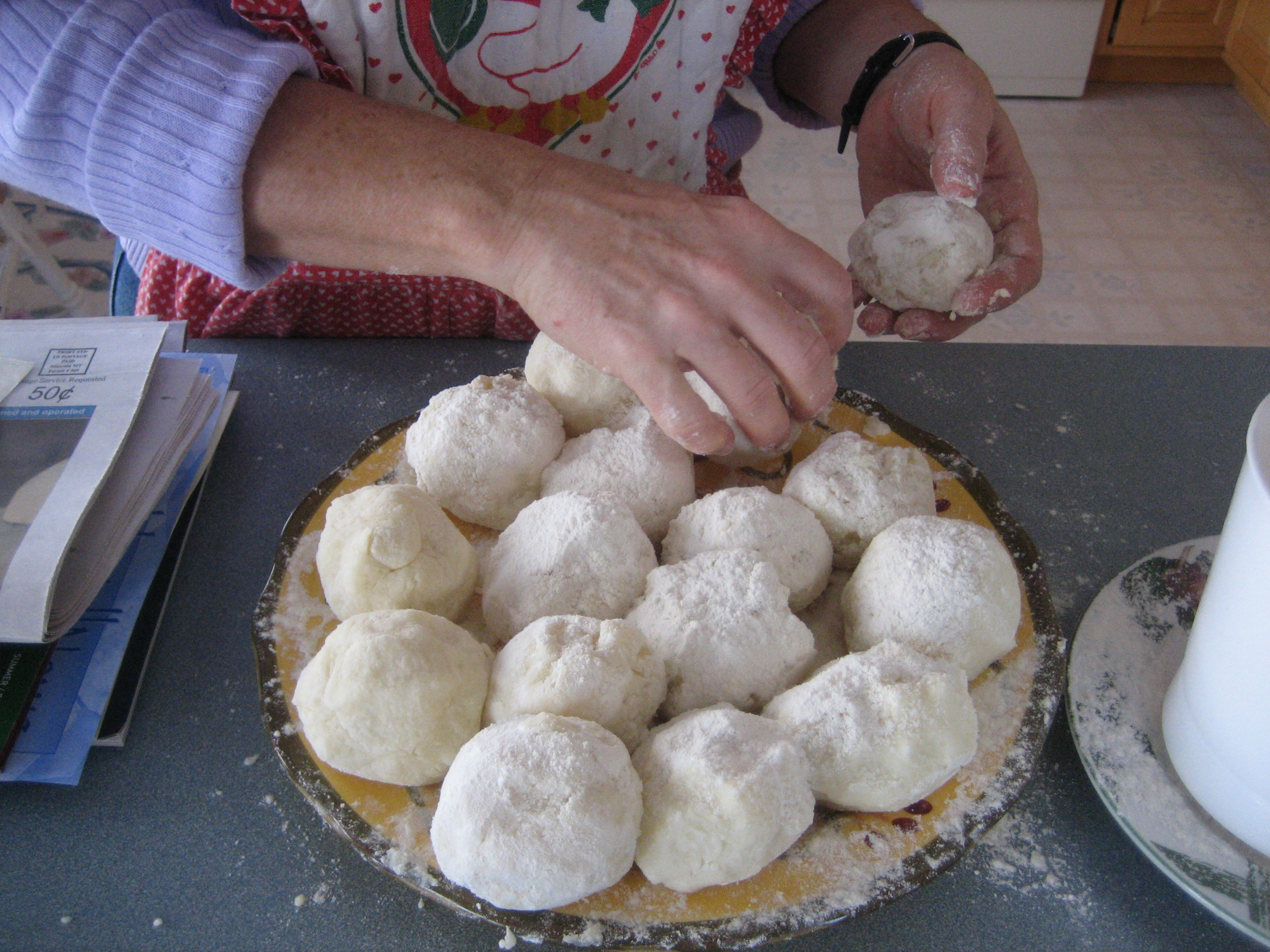
Balls of lefse dough

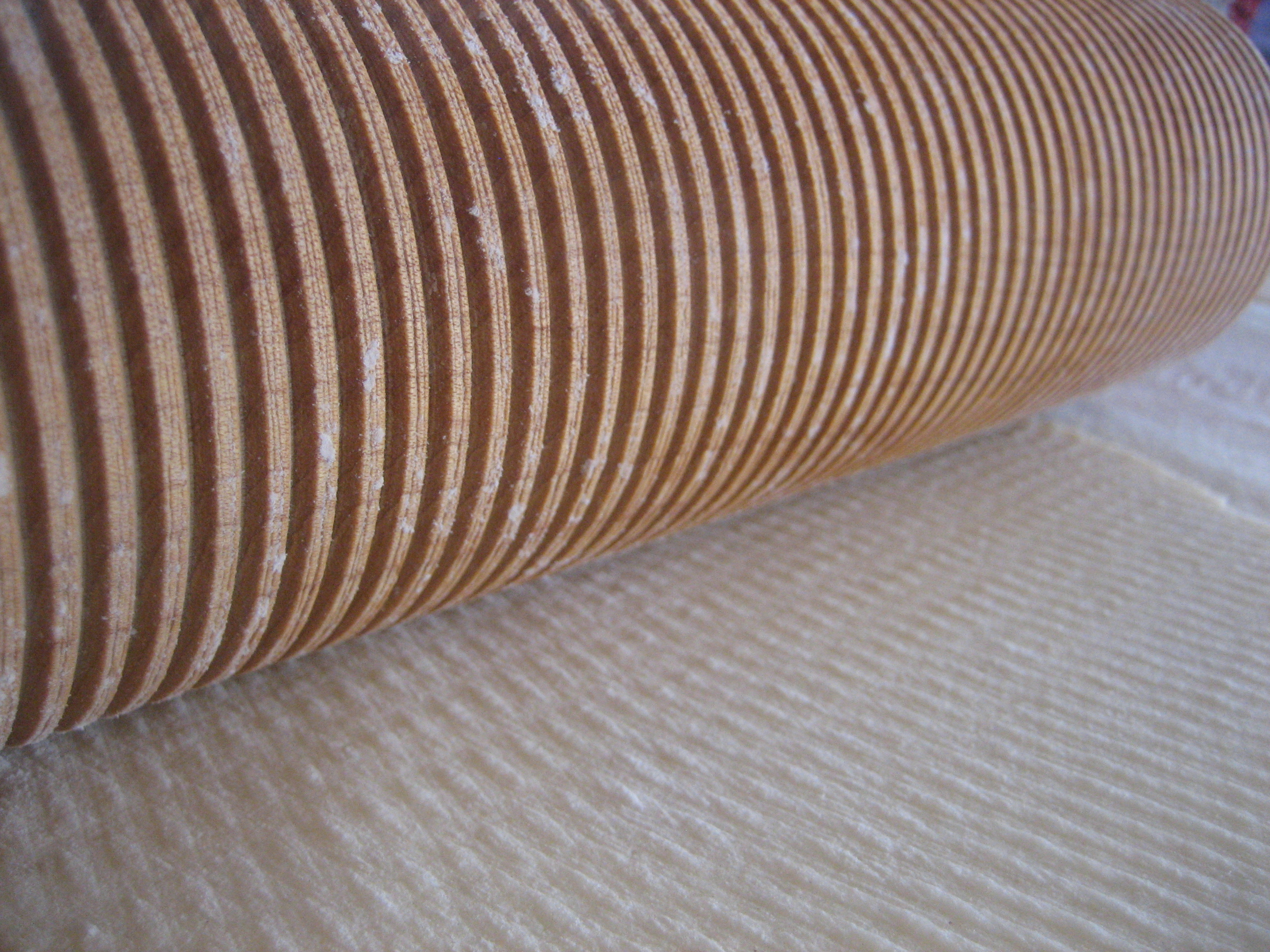
Lefse rolling pin

Lefse (Norwegian pronunciation: [ˈlɛ́fsə̌], cognate to loaf), dialectally also lefsa (among others), is a traditional soft Norwegian flatbread, also found regionally in Sweden (Swedish: läfsa, löfsa). It is made with riced potatoes, can include all purpose (wheat) flour, and includes butter, and milk, cream, or lard. It is cooked on a large, flat griddle. Special tools are used to prepare lefse, including a potato ricer, long wooden turning sticks and special rolling pins with deep grooves.

== Flavoring ==
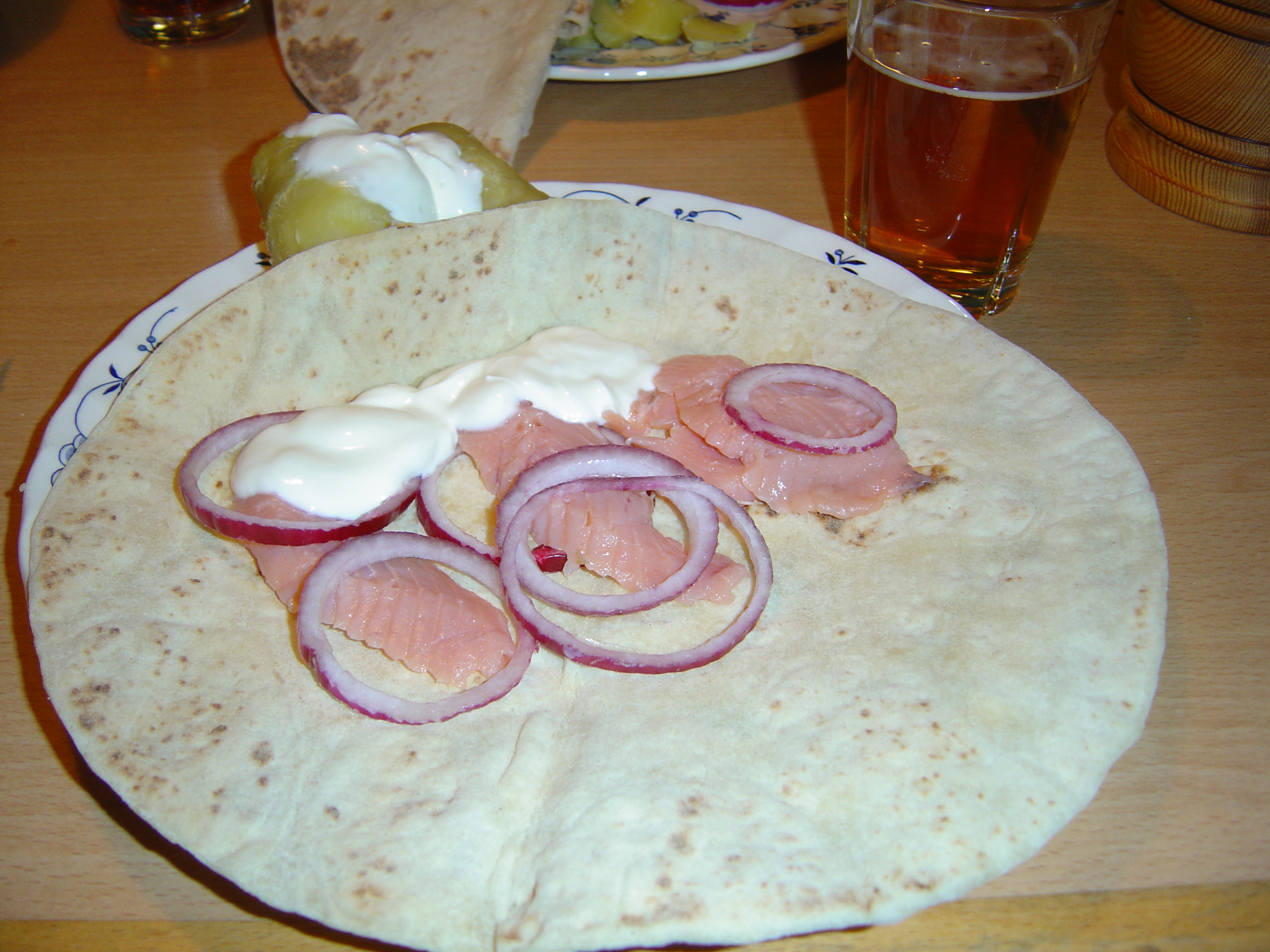
A lefse topped with rakfisk, served with onion and sour cream

There are many ways of flavoring lefse. The most common is adding butter and sugar to the lefse and rolling it up. In Norway, this is known as lefse-klenning. Other options include adding cinnamon, or spreading jelly, lingonberries, or gomme on it. Scandinavian-American variations include rolling it with a thin layer of peanut butter and sugar, with butter and white or brown sugar, with butter and corn syrup, or with butter and salt, or with ham and eggs. Also eaten with beef and other savory items like ribberull and mustard, it is comparable to a tortilla. Lefse is a traditional accompaniment to lutefisk, and the fish is often rolled up in the lefse.

== Variations ==
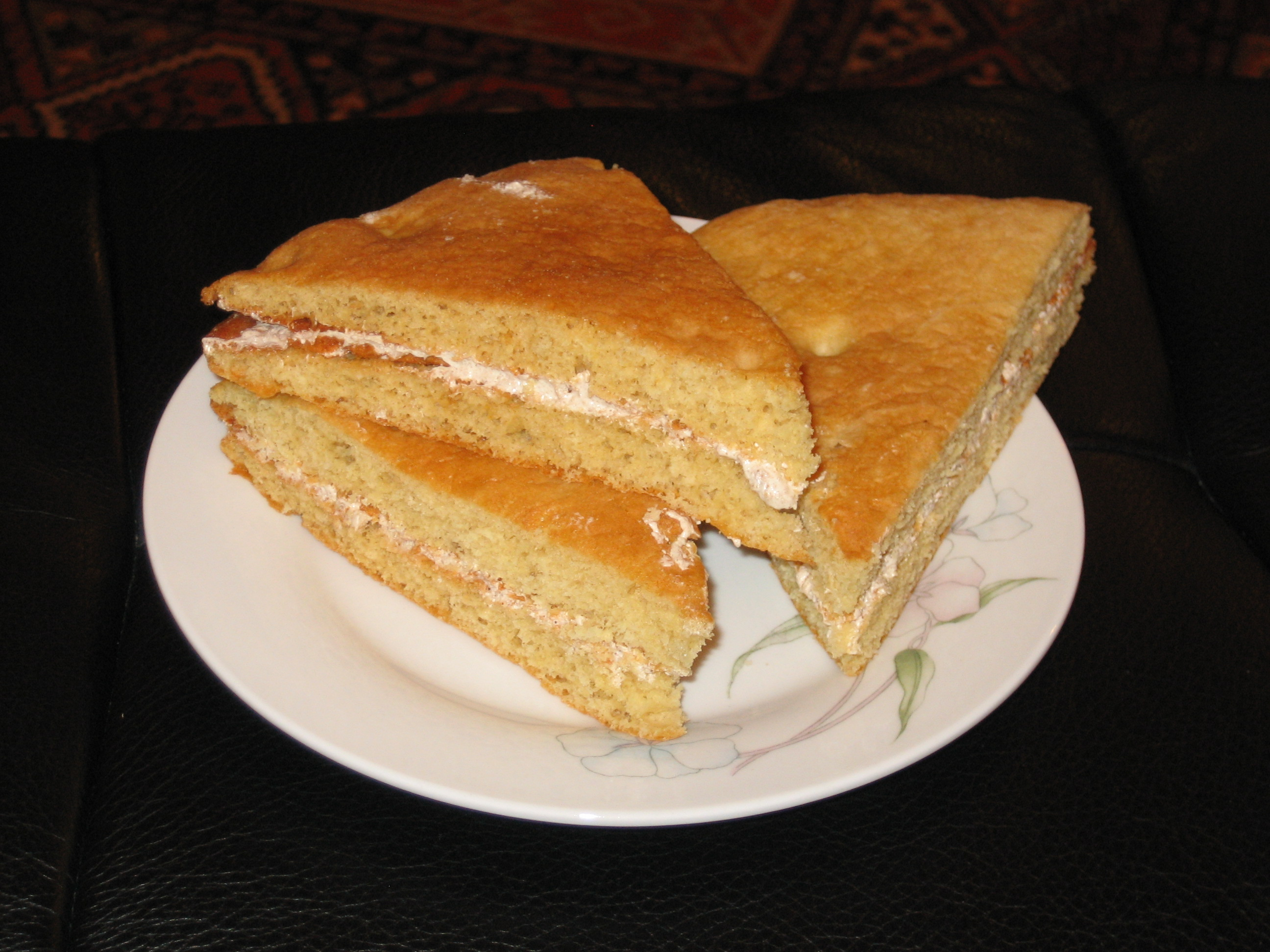
Norwegian tykklefse

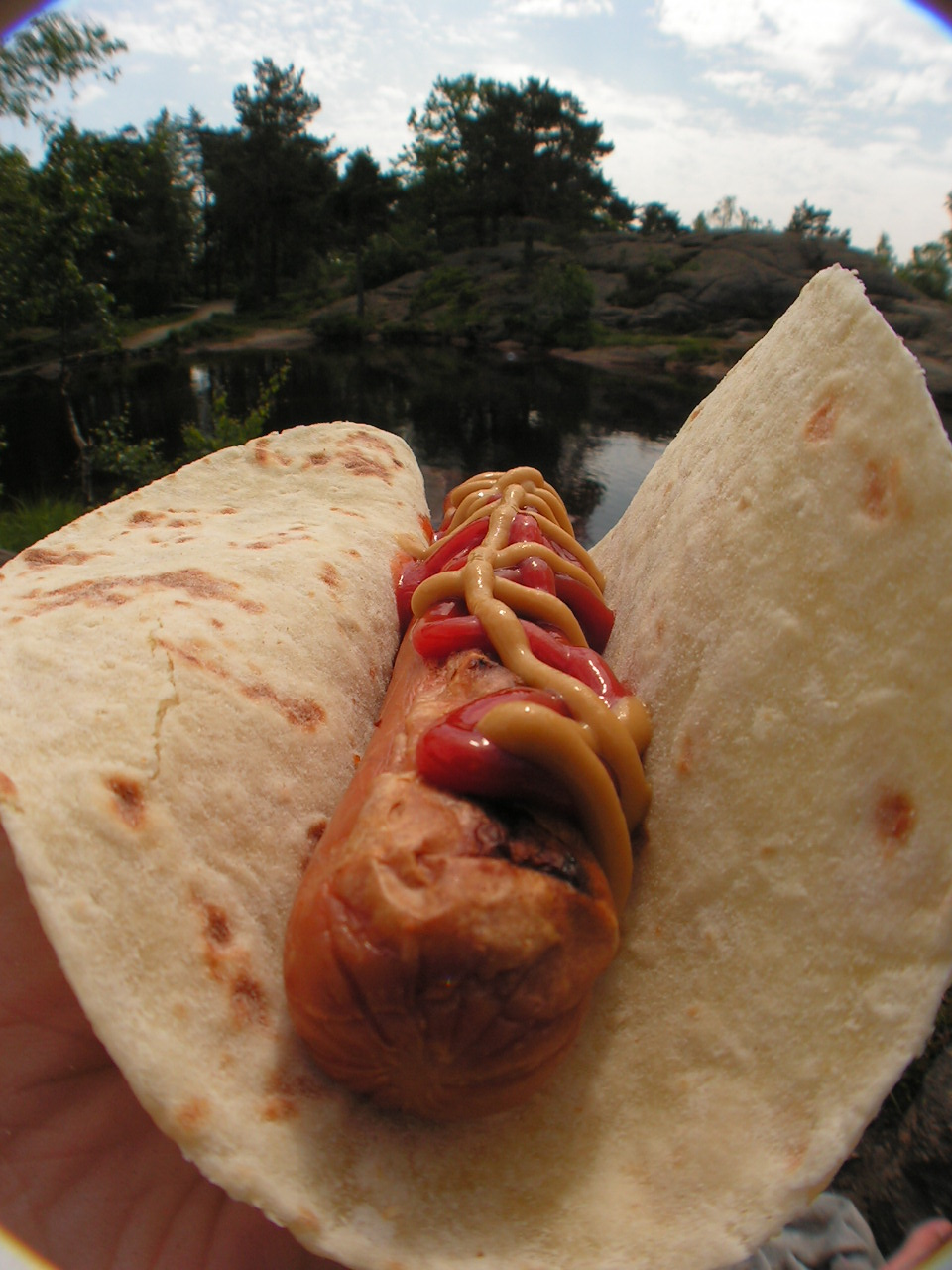
Pølse med lompe (en: sausage with lompe) is a popular Norwegian dish. Preferred toppings are added to taste.

There are significant regional variations in Norway in the way lefse is made and eaten, but it generally resembles a flatbread, although in many parts of Norway, especially Valdres, it is far thinner.

Tynnlefse ('thin lefse') is a variation made in central Norway. Tynnlefse is rolled up with butter, sugar, and cinnamon (or with butter and brown sugar).

Tjukklefse or tykklefse is thicker and often served with coffee as a cake.

Potetlefse ('potato lefse') is similar to and used like tynnlefse, but made with potatoes.

Lompe or potetkake is the smaller version of the potato lefse, and usually made with only boiled potatoes, flour and salt. It is often used in place of a hot dog bun and can be used to roll up sausages. This is also known as pølse med lompe in Norway. Norway's Constitution Day on May 17 is one of the most popular days to eat the dish. Toppings include ketchup and mustard, but can also include raw or crispy onions, and other types of relish.

Møsbrømlefse is a variation common to Salten district in Nordland in Northern Norway. Møsbrømmen is eaten with a sweetened sauce made of brunost, a type of cheese, flour, and sugar. It is ready when møsbrømmen is warm and the butter is melted.

Nordlandslefse is a chunky small lefse. Made of butter, syrup, sugar, eggs, and flour. Originally created in western Norway as a treat for fishermen who worked at the Lofoten Fishery.

Anislefse is made on the coast of Hordaland. It resembles thin lefse but is slightly thicker, and it is stained by large amounts of whole aniseed.

== Hardangerlefse ==
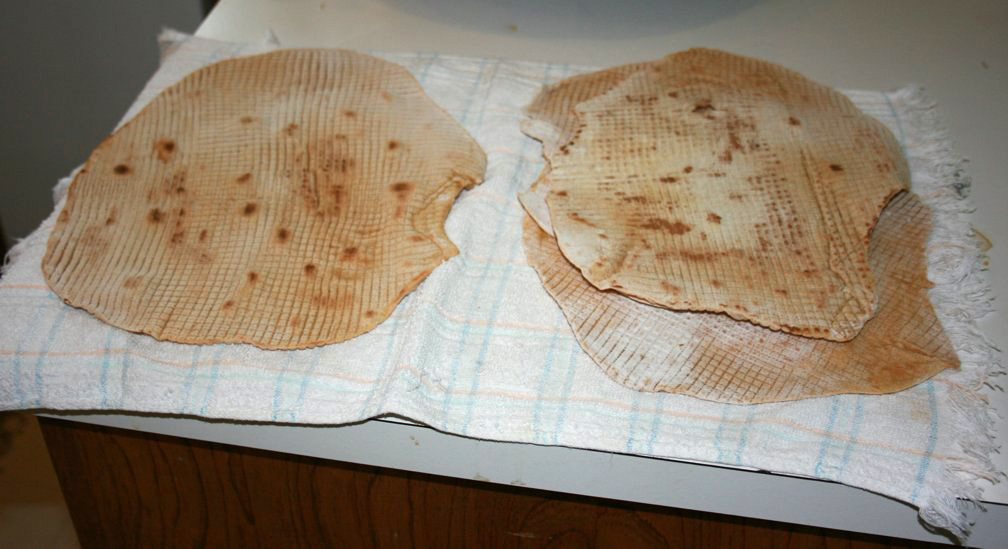
Hardangerlefse

Another variety, the Hardangerlefse (from Hardanger in Norway), is made from yeast-risen Graham flour or a fine ground whole wheat flour (krotekake). It is often made with egg yolks and buttermilk instead of potatoes. The dough is rolled with a conventional rolling pin (and much more flour) until it is thin and does not stick to the surface. It is then cut with a grooved rolling pin in perpendicular directions, cutting a grid into the dough which prevents it from creating air pockets as it cooks. The grid cut can also aid in thinner rolling of the lefse, as the ridges help preserve structural integrity. The lefse is cooked at high temperature (400 °F or 205 °C) until browned, and then left to dry. It can also be freeze-dried by repeatedly freezing and thawing.

Dried Hardangerlefse can be stored without refrigeration for six months or more, so long as it is kept dry. It is customarily thought that the bread (along with lutefisk) was a staple on the seagoing voyages as far back as Viking times.

The dry lefse is dipped in water, and then placed within a towel which has also been dipped in water and wrung out. Many people maintain that dipping in salted or seawater enhances the flavor. The dry lefse regains its bread-like texture in about 60 minutes. Often that time is used to prepare such ingredients as eggs or herring, which are wrapped in the lefse once it has softened.

== Lefse in the United States ==
=== Holidays ===
Lefse is a Norwegian treat that is especially popular around the Christmas holidays. Many Nordic and Scandinavian Americans eat lefse primarily around Thanksgiving and Christmas.

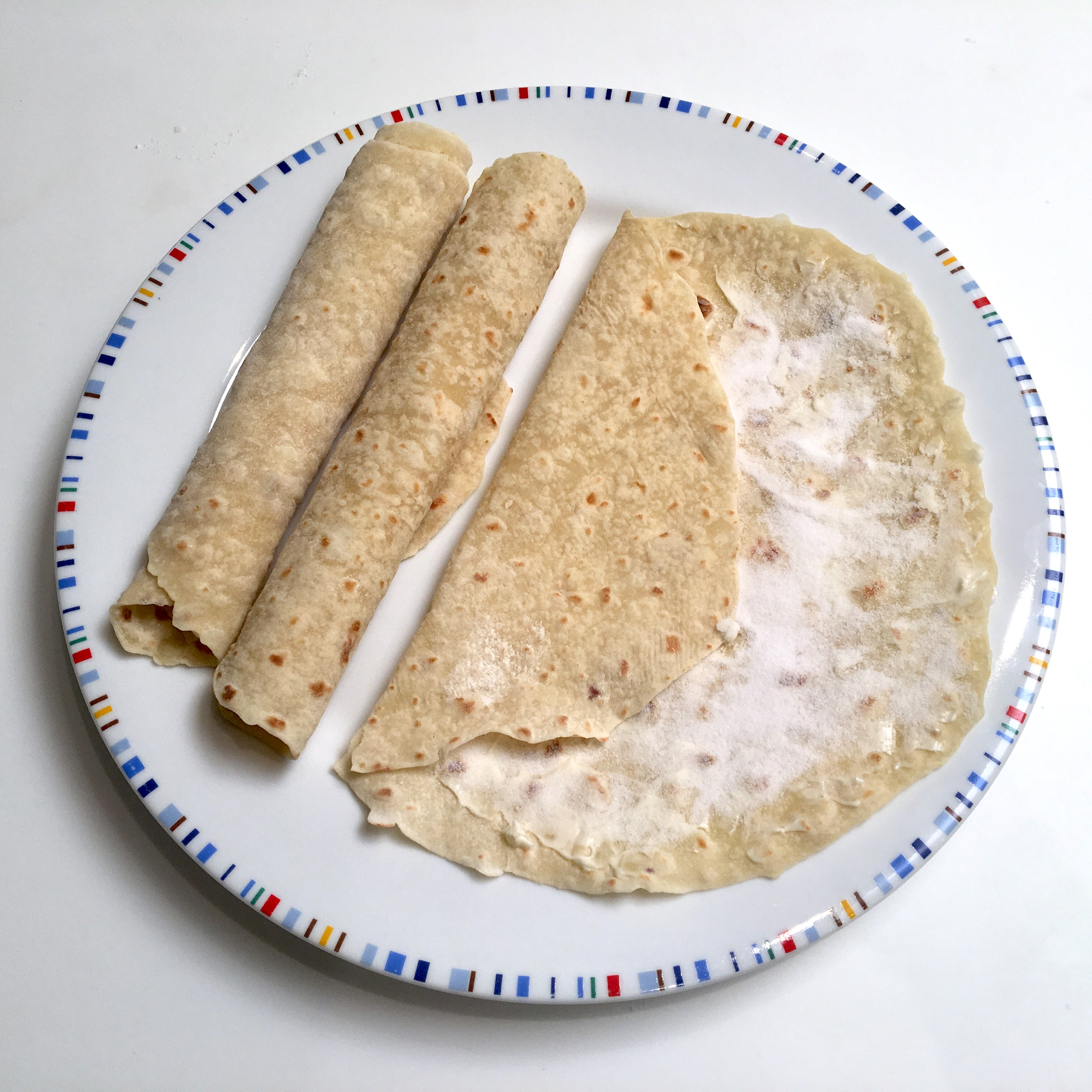
Dessert lefse, butter and sugar

=== History ===
==== General ====
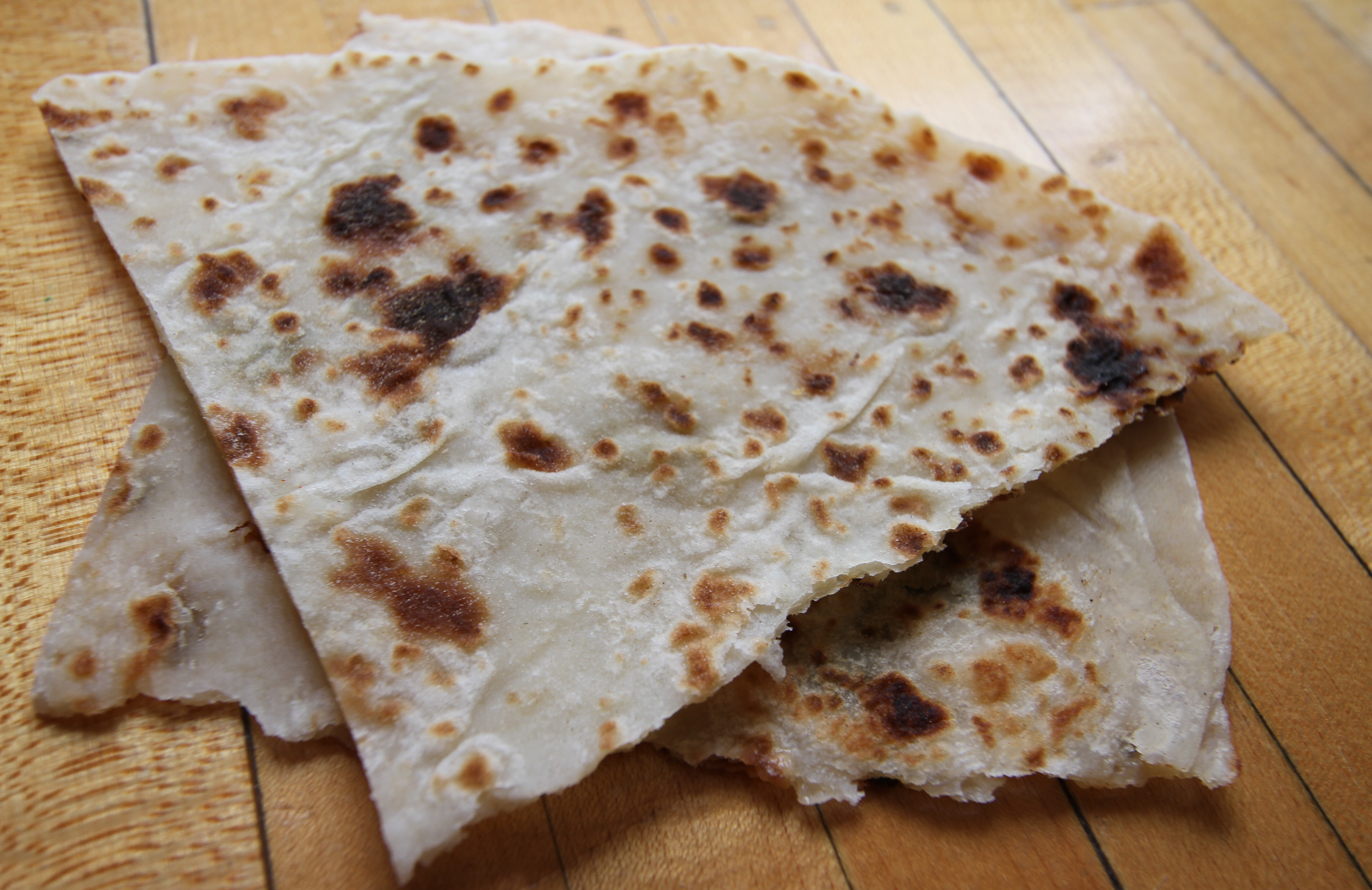
Potato lefse sold at the Syttende mai festival in Spring Grove, Minnesota

While the Midwest almost always makes its lefse with potatoes, this is not necessarily the case in Norway. When one uses the term lefse in the United States, it typically refers to what Norwegians call potato lefse. Norwegians, however, also make Hardangerlefse with egg yolks and buttermilk. The tradition of making lefse was brought over by Norwegian Americans, and potato lefse itself was made when their potato crop was successful. Due to this, it became more prevalent than other types in the United States. When lefse was able to be made, it was stored in small storage buildings called bryggerhus. When Norwegian immigrants first arrived in America, they did not have the usual foods they were used to back home, including milk and porridge, dried meat, and lefse, but early Norwegian-American immigrants brought folded lefse to eat for the beginning stages of their journey via ship. After these were eaten, the lack of food they were used to is likely why they turned back to tradition so quickly.

During World War I, Americans were encouraged to eat potatoes to be patriotic, as wheat was needed to feed the troops on the front lines. Lefse, a staple for Norwegian Americans, was eaten with gusto during this time.

While lefse is generally not eaten with day-to-day meals in Norway today, Norwegian Americans traditionally give prominence to having lefse with dinner.

==== Keeping the tradition alive ====
- Family members often gather to cook lefse as a group effort because the process is more enjoyable as a traditional holiday activity. This gathering also provides training to younger generations keeping the tradition alive.
- The Sons of Norway have lodges to teach making lefse to younger generations. A lodge in Vancouver, Washington, uses up to 60 pounds (27 kg) of potatoes to make lefse every month. While lefse used to be eaten as a snack food, it is now more often made in large quantities for such lutefisk dinners.
- Some professional lefse makers can roll 85 to 100 lefse per hour, or even up to 140.

=== Where lefse is found ===
In Norway today, most families tend to purchase their lefse rather than making it. While today's Norwegian Americans consider making lefse at Christmas a tradition, more families are turning to purchase it from the store instead. Lefse can also be found in many grocery stores around Midwestern states and the Pacific Northwest states, including Minnesota, North Dakota, South Dakota, Iowa, Wisconsin, Oregon, Alaska, and Washington. Norsland Lefse, a factory in Rushford, Minnesota, produces about a half million rounds of lefse each year. The foodway of Scandinavian lefse stretches from the Midwest all the way through northeastern Montana. Small lefse factories dot the landscape throughout this area, mostly in Norwegian communities. In the larger of these communities, Lefse can be found in grocery stores year round. In the Red River Valley specifically, "restaurants, supermarkets, and clubs all serve fish, lefse, and other specialties." Many United States Scandinavian festivals have booths to sell lefse, and it can also be ordered online.

=== World's largest lefse ===
The town of Starbuck, Minnesota, is the home of the world's largest lefse. It was made on July 1, 1983.

=== Celebrations and festivals ===
Lefse is celebrated in cities and towns with large Scandinavian populations. Fargo, North Dakota, hosts the popular Lutefisk and Lefse Festival in August each year. Fosston, Minnesota, invites area lefse makers to compete for the title of Champion Lefse Maker at its Lefse Fest in November. In Mankato, Minnesota, Minnesotans of Scandinavian descent celebrate lefse day, a day for cooking lefse, on the Sunday after Thanksgiving. The Potato Days festival has been taking place in Barnesville, Minnesota, since the early 1930s; this festival also takes part in the National Lefse Cookoff.

=== Rumors and jokes ===
Rumors surrounding the initial use of lefse are the claims by Norwegian Americans that it was made by and used to sustain the Vikings, but potatoes were not introduced into Norway until long after the Vikings' time.

Although many Scandinavian-Americans do enjoy and eat the foods of their ethnic traditions, there is no shortage of tall-tales and jokes surrounding certain food, as well. Lefse was not excluded from these rumors. Among other things, lefse has been said to be "so tasteless that many mistakenly eat the paper doily under the stack and do not know the difference."

=== Integrating lefse into other foodways ===
Sometimes Norwegian foods are integrated into other ethnic foodways. For example, one may use lefse to make enchilada. American lefse is sometimes served with butter, cinnamon sugar, brown sugar, or lingonberry jelly before being rolled, to be eaten like a crêpe. One may also add eggs, sausage, and cheese to make it into a breakfast burrito. One may even roll smørrebrød into their lefse.

== See also ==
- Chapati
- Farl
- Flatbrød
- Potato scone
- Svele
- Tunnbröd

== Other sources ==
- Legwold, Gary (1991). The Last Word on Lefse. Adventure Publication. ISBN 978-0-934860-78-9.
- Ojakangas, Beatrice (1999). The Great Scandinavian Baking Book. University of Minnesota Press. ISBN 978-0-8166-3496-5.
