= Rullepølse =

Traditional Danish spiced cold cut meat roll

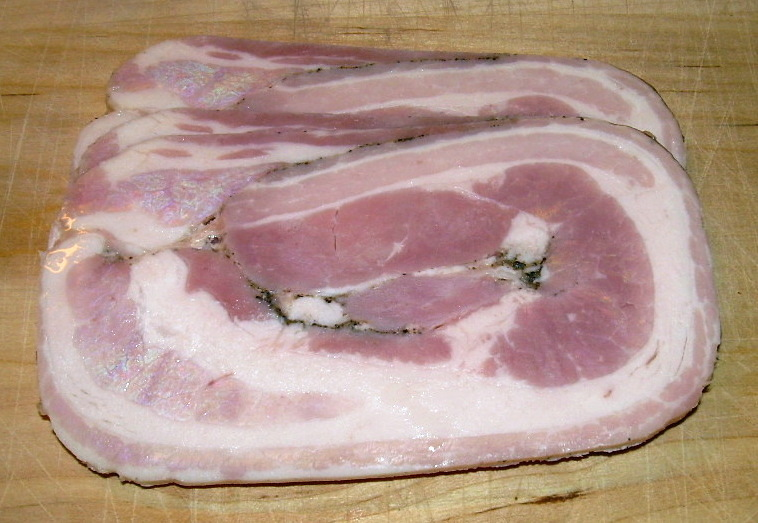
Rullepølse

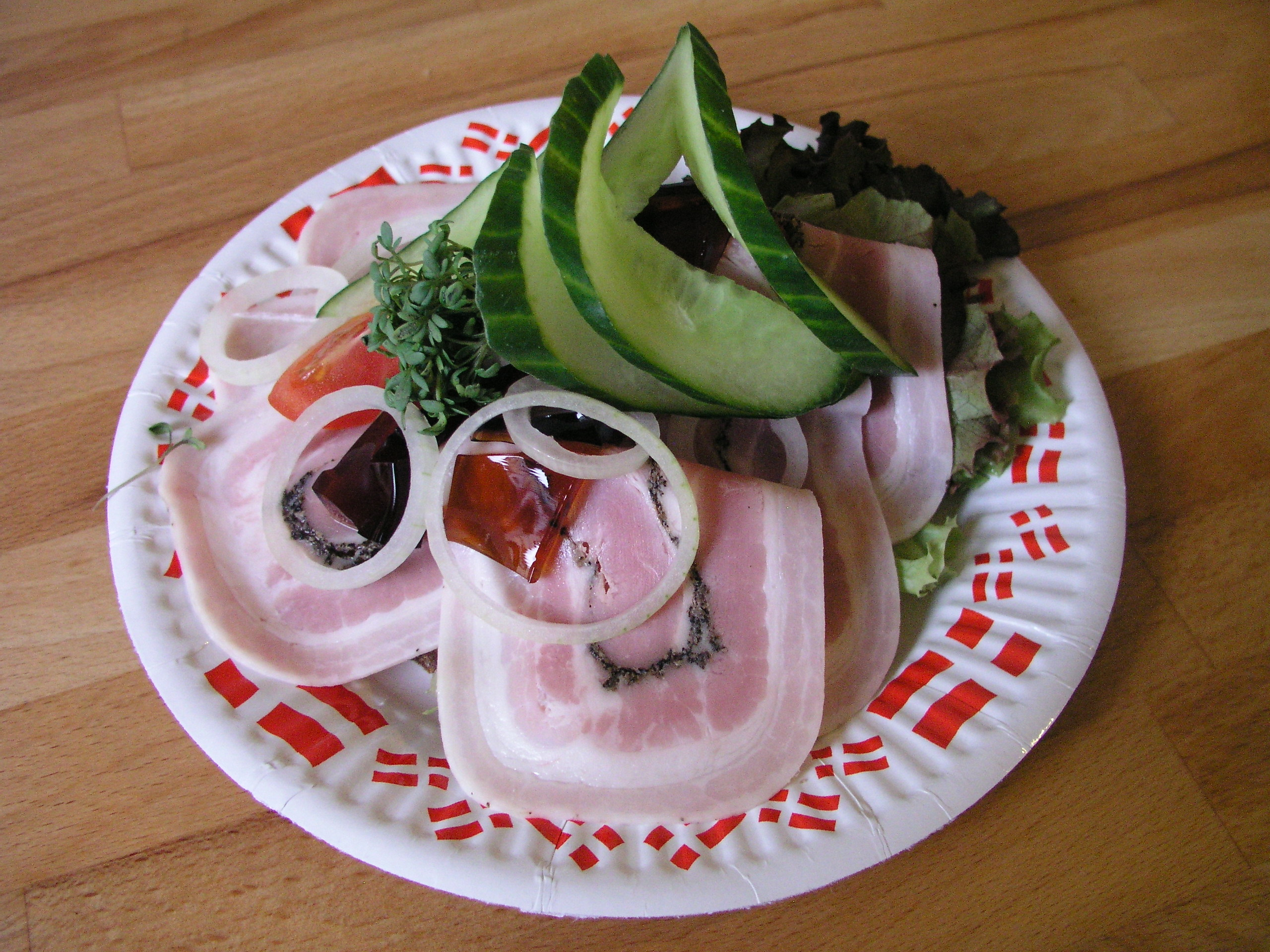
Rullepølse on smørrebrød

Rullepølse (Danish pronunciation: [ˈʁuləˌpʰølsə], rolled sausage) is a traditional Danish cold cut. A piece of pork belly – variants use beef flank or lamb – is flattened out and is spread with herbs and seasoning (salt, pepper, allspice), chopped onions, and in some variants, parsley. It is then rolled up and placed in a brine for a number of days, before being boiled, placed in a special press, cooled, and sliced thinly. It is often used on rugbrød to make the traditional Danish open-faced sandwich, smørrebrød, usually garnished with a thick slice of sky and rings of raw onion.

Similar items also exist in a Swedish version, rullsylta, and a Norwegian version, ribberull, which is made of a lamb shoulder – boned, flattened, sewn to form a long rectangle, rolled, pressed, and steamed.

== See also ==
- List of pork dishes
