= Thanksgiving sandwich =

Sandwich made from traditional Thanksgiving food

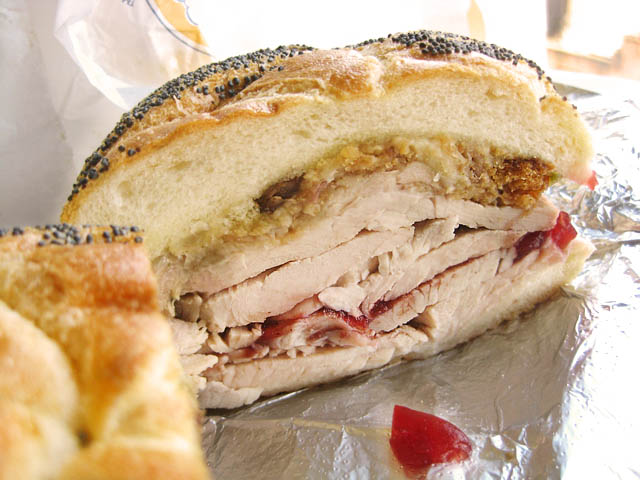
- Alternative names: Gobbler; Pilgrim; Puritan
- Type: Sandwich
- Place of origin: United States
- Region or state: New England

A Thanksgiving sandwich or Thanksgiving leftovers sandwich, also called a Gobbler, Pilgrim, or Puritan, is an American sandwich constructed from traditional foods eaten on American Thanksgiving, such as roast turkey, stuffing, cranberry sauce, and gravy.

== History ==
The origin of the Thanksgiving sandwich is disputed. It may have originated in New England, with recipes and local restaurant claimants by the 1950s. A recipe for a "Thanksgiving Sandwich Special" sandwich featuring a meat salad of turkey, veal and optionally cranberry jelly is given in a 1915 Chicago trade journal.

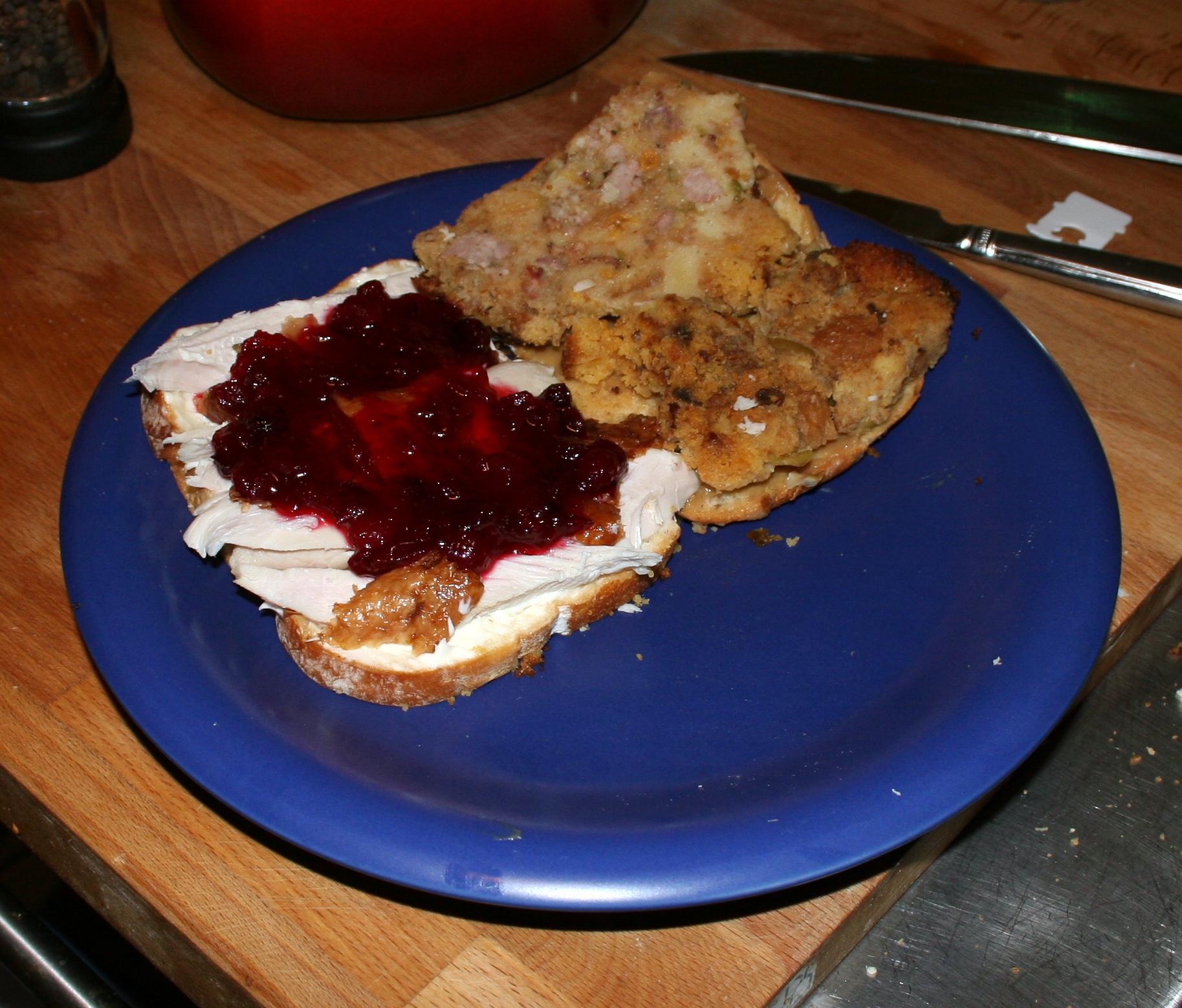
Open-faced Thanksgiving sandwich

== Variations ==
=== Hot turkey commercial ===
In Minnesota, a variation of the Thanksgiving sandwich known as the hot turkey commercial is commonly eaten after Thanksgiving. This sandwich is open faced and consists of turkey, turkey gravy, and mashed potatoes on white bread.

=== Commercial versions ===
The Thanksgiving sandwich has been adapted to chain store menus:

Capriotti's, the Bobbie (1976)
pulled turkey, stuffing, cranberry sauce, mayonnaise
Wawa, the Gobbler (2005)
hoagie with hot turkey, stuffing, cranberry sauce, gravy
GetGo, the Pilgrim (circa 2014)
sliced turkey, cranberry sauce, cheddar cheese, gravy on stuffing bread
Publix, Turkey Cranberry Holiday Sub (2020)
sliced deli turkey, cranberry-orange relish, bacon, Gruyère

== Popular culture ==
In the 1998 episode of Friends, S5E9 "The One with Ross' Sandwich", character Monica Geller constructs a double-decker Thanksgiving leftovers sandwich for her brother Ross Geller, featuring a so-called "moist maker"—the middle bread slice soaked in gravy. Ross's sandwich, referred by fans by the synecdoche "The Moist Maker", features in the show's official cookbook, released in 2020.

== See also ==
- Turkey Devonshire
- List of American sandwiches
- Christmas sandwich
