= Capriotti's Sandwich Shop =

American fast casual restaurant chain

Coordinates: 39.750222°N 75.572142°W

Capriotti's Sandwich Shop, Inc.
- Type: Private
- Industry: Restaurants Franchising
- Genre: Fast Casual
- Founded: 1976; 50 years ago Wilmington, Delaware, US
- Founders: Lois and Alan Margolet
- Headquarters: Las Vegas, Nevada, U.S.
- Number of locations: 160+
- Area served: United States
- Key people: Ashley Morris (CEO); Jason Smylie (President); Kim Lewis (CMO/CTO); David Bloom (CDO); George Chanos (Chairman)
- Products: Sandwiches; Subs; Soups; Salads; Snacks; Soft drinks
- Revenue: ▲US$150 million (FEB 2021)
- Number of employees: About 1,000
- Website: www.capriottis.com

Capriotti's Sandwich Shop, Inc. (also called Capriotti's) is a fast casual restaurant chain in the United States. The restaurant chain was founded in Wilmington, Delaware in 1976. As of July 2025, Capriotti's has more than 175 company-owned and franchise locations in 33 states.

== History ==
Capriotti's was founded in Little Italy, Wilmington, Delaware in 1976. The restaurant is named after the founders' grandfather, Philip Capriotti. In 1988, the second restaurant location opened in New Castle, Delaware. In 1991, Capriotti's began franchising their restaurants.

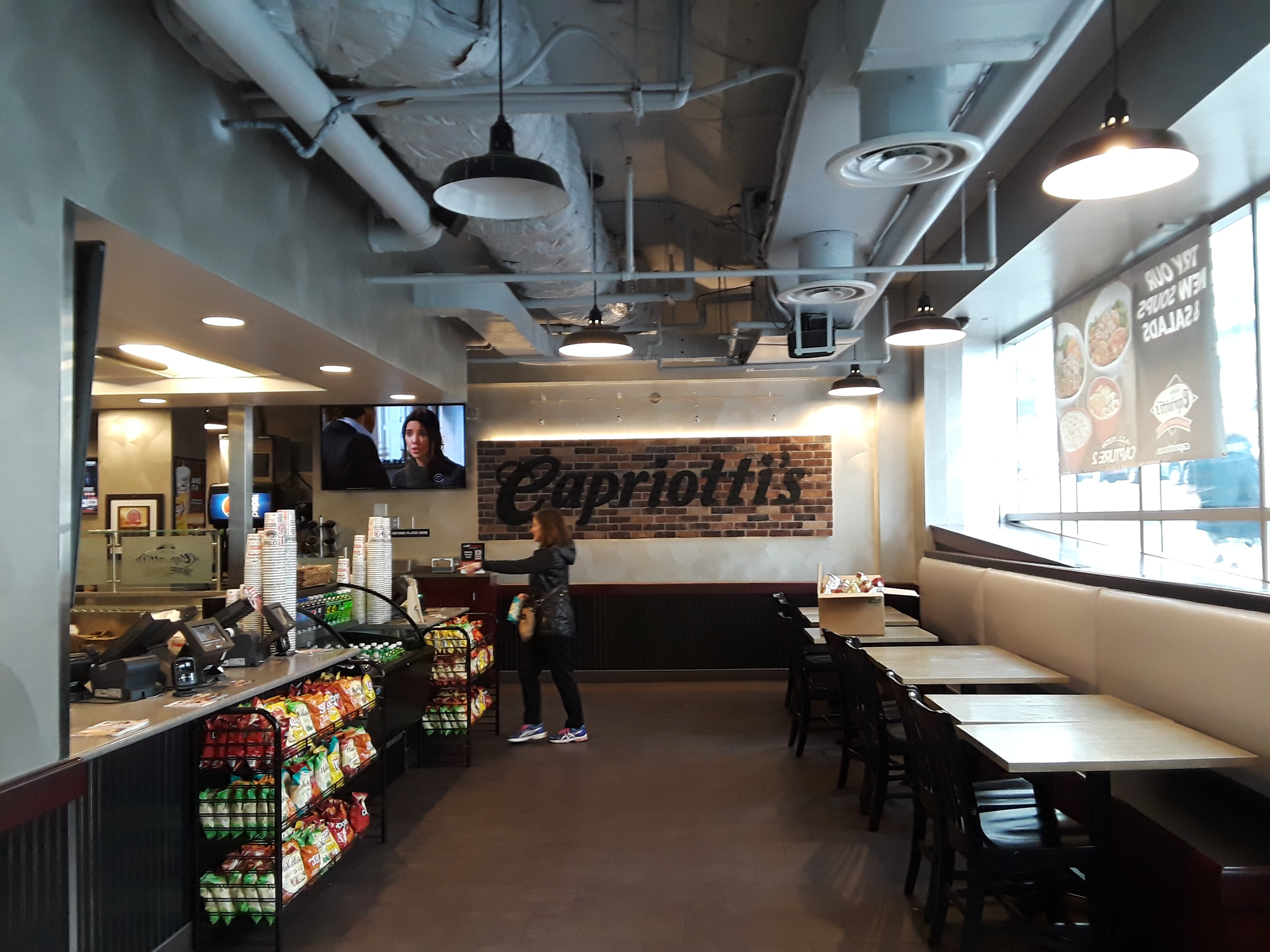
Counter area of a Capriotti's in Rosslyn, Arlington, Virginia (now closed)

In 1993, the first restaurant location in Las Vegas, Nevada was opened on Sahara Avenue, near Las Vegas Boulevard. In 2004, Ashley Morris and Jason Smylie opened a franchise in Las Vegas. At the time, Morris was the youngest financial adviser at Wells Fargo. Smylie was a software engineer at Bechtel Nevada. Morris and Smylie were also investors in the housing market and made the decision to invest in a franchise after learning that the return on investment was higher than anything they were looking at investing in. In 2007, Morris and Smylie put the company in escrow. In the following year Morris, Smylie and a group of investors consisting of 95% Las Vegans bought Capriotti's. Capriotti's had 44 restaurant locations by the end of 2008. Morris is the CEO of the company. In 2008 and 2009 the chain was the official sandwich sponsor of the World Series of Poker in Las Vegas. Capriotti's was ranked in Entrepreneur magazine's top 500 franchise list in 2010 and remained ranked through 2014.

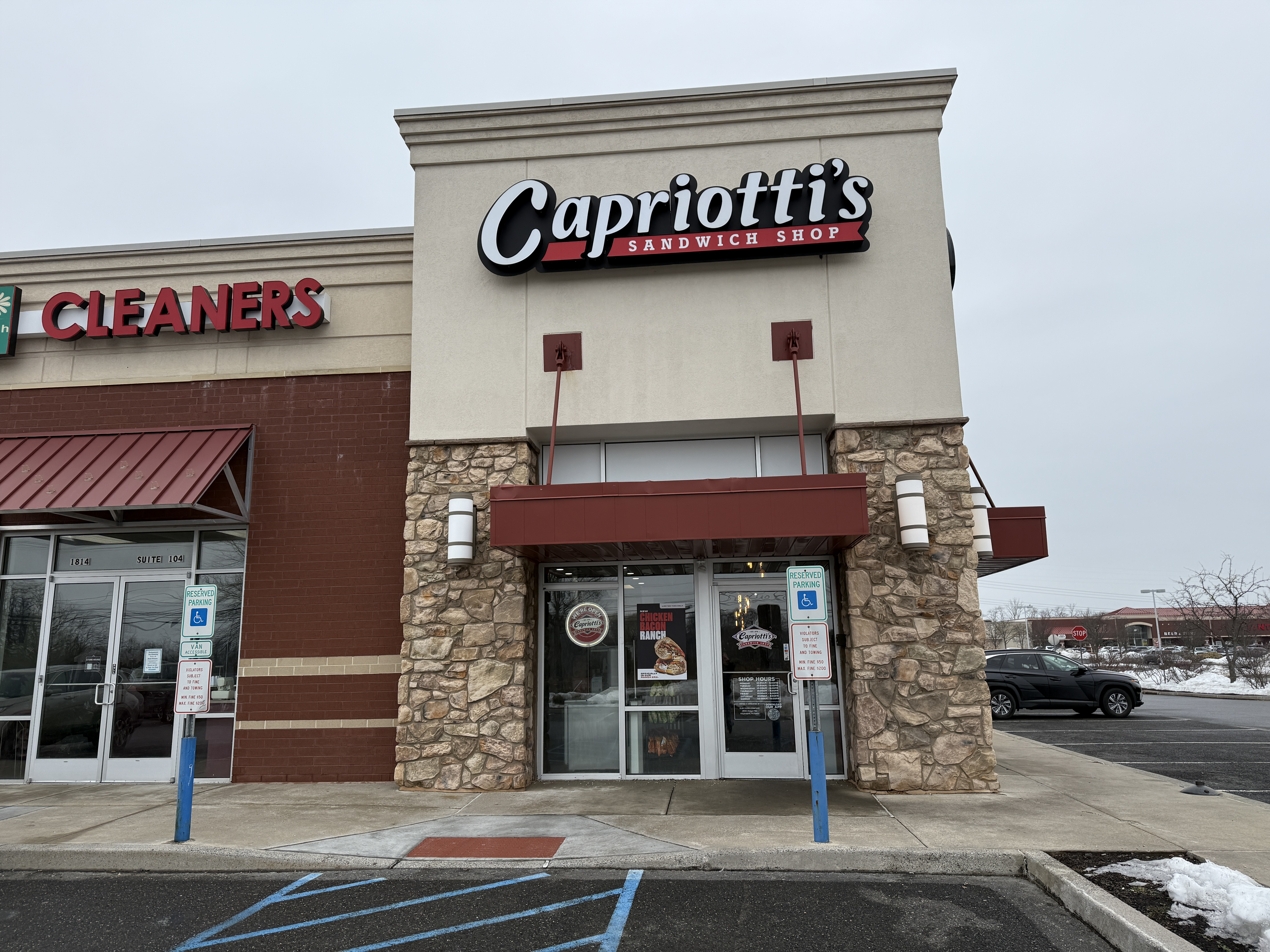
Capriotti's location near Royersford, Pennsylvania

Capriotti's starred on Food Network's Unwrapped in December 2011. In November 2013, Capriotti's expanded its presence on the East Coast by opening its first location in Washington DC. Joe Biden was the first customer served at the store's grand opening. That year, Capriotti's brought in over $58 million in revenue and experienced a 48% growth over the previous three years. In 2014, the company was named one of the "Top 10 Best Food Franchises for Your Buck" and one of "America's Best Franchises" by Forbes magazine.

The Sandelman & Associates Quick Track Study on the Top 10 Quick Service Restaurant Concepts ranked Capriotti's among the top ten in overall satisfaction and won the award for highest quality and taste in the 2014 study.

== Business operations ==
Capriotti's is now based in Las Vegas, Nevada and has its largest concentration of shops there. The restaurant chain has over 175 locations in 33 states including: Arizona, Arkansas, California, Colorado, Connecticut, Delaware, Florida, Georgia, Hawaii, Idaho, Illinois, Indiana, Iowa, Kansas, Maryland, Massachusetts, Minnesota, Mississippi, Missouri, Nebraska, Nevada, New Jersey, New York, North Carolina, Ohio, Oklahoma, Oregon, Pennsylvania, South Carolina, South Dakota, Texas, Utah and Virginia. In 2014, it ranked #293 in Entrepreneur's Franchise 500. In 2016, Capriotti's was ranked #264 in Entrepreneur's Franchise 500. The chain expects to open 750 stores by 2032.

== Products ==
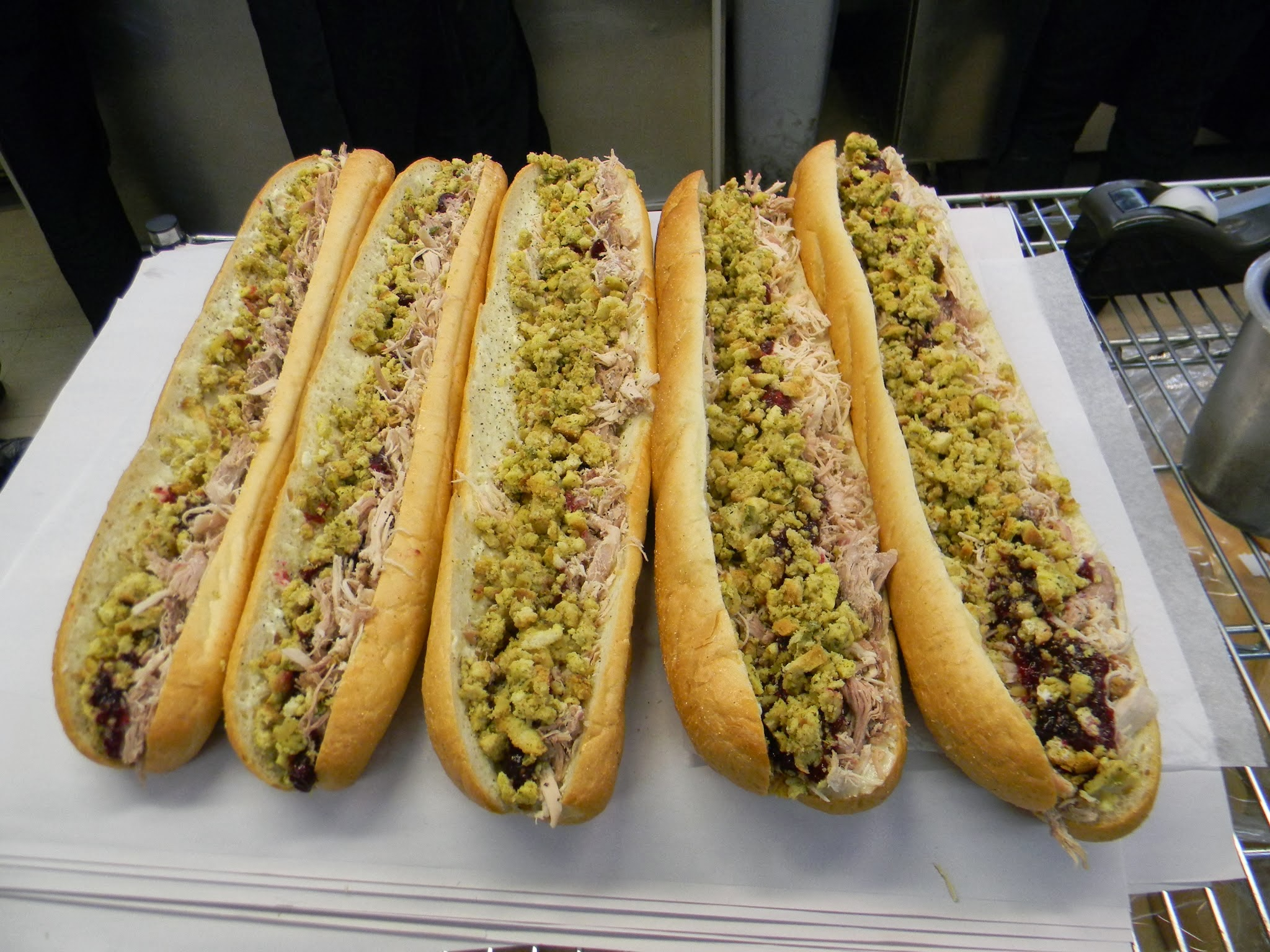
Bobbies from Capriotti's

Capriotti's specializes in cold, grilled, and vegetarian hoagies or submarine sandwiches. Each restaurant roasts whole turkeys for 12 hours nightly, hand pulls meats, and makes their own meatballs and coleslaw.

In November 2009, the Bobbie, one of Capriotti's signature sandwiches, was voted "The Greatest Sandwich in America" by AOL.com. The sandwich is a Thanksgiving sandwich made with pulled turkey, cranberry sauce, stuffing and mayonnaise. The Margolets named it after their aunt. In 2012, USA Today named Capriotti's one of the "10 Great Places for a Surprising Sandwich".
