= Braunschweiger (sausage) =

Sausage named after Braunschweig, Germany

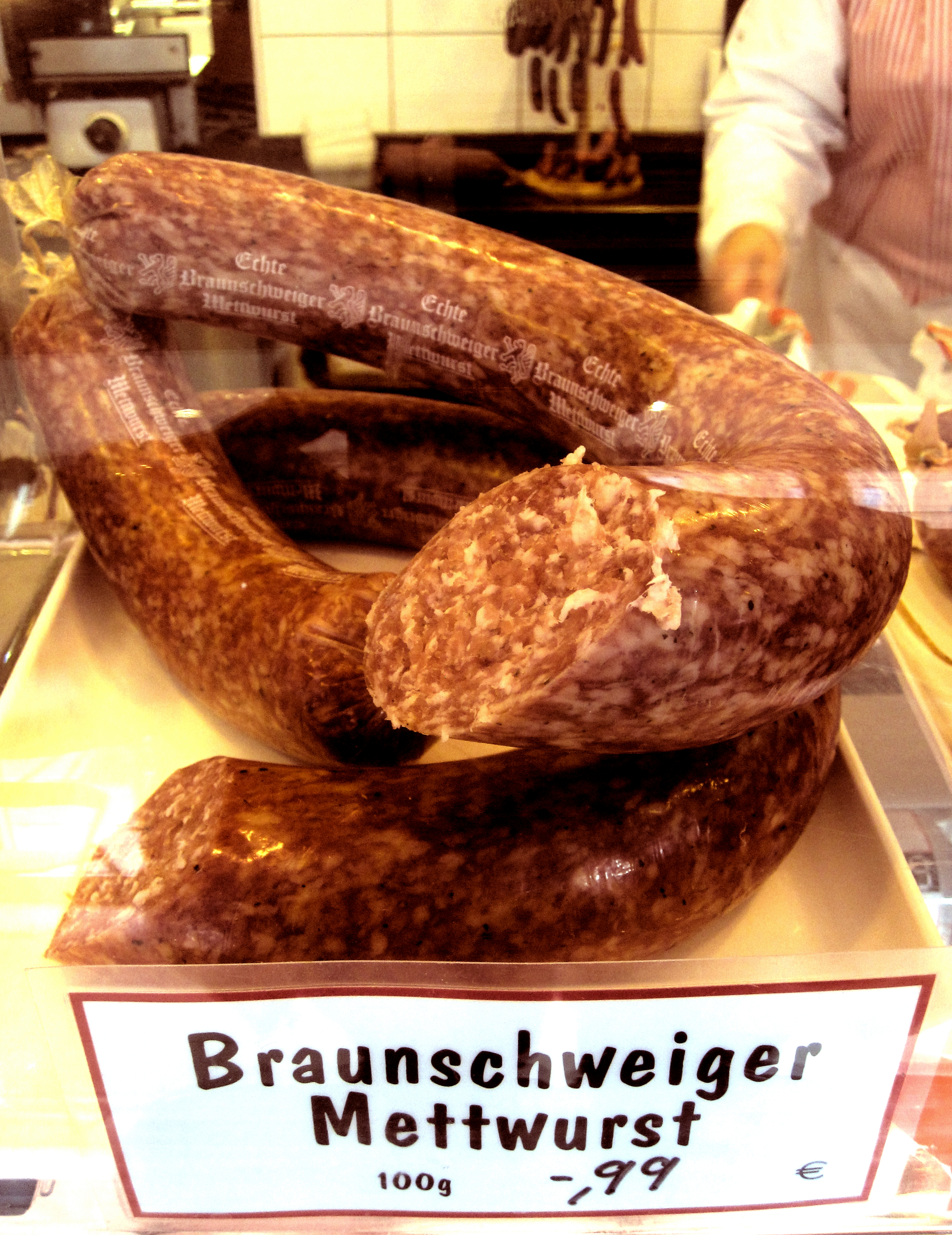
- Braunschweiger Mettwurst in a Brunswick butcher's shop
- Type: Fresh sausage
- Place of origin: Germany
- Region or state: Braunschweig
- Main ingredients: Pork
- Variations: Braunschweiger

Braunschweiger (/ˈbɹɑʊ̯nˌʃwɑɪgɚ/, named after Braunschweig, Germany) is a type of sausage. The type of sausage the term refers to varies by region. In the German language, Braunschweiger is the demonym for people from Brunswick (German name Braunschweig), but under German food law refers to a variety of mettwurst. In Austria, Braunschweiger is known as a type of parboiled sausage (Brühwurst), while American Braunschweiger is often confused with liverwurst.

== Germany ==
Braunschweiger Mettwurst is a smoked, soft and spreadable sausage usually made from raw minced pork and spiced with garlic, salt and pepper. Produced by Brunswick butchers as a regional speciality since the early 19th century, it became widespread with the advent of food preservation by canning. Several different recipes exist, some also including beef and fat.

== Austria ==
In Austria, Braunschweiger is a Brühwurst variant which is similar to Jagdwurst ("hunting sausage"), made with a mixture of pork and beef, bacon and nitrite curing salt. This type of sausage is usually eaten between meals.

== North America ==
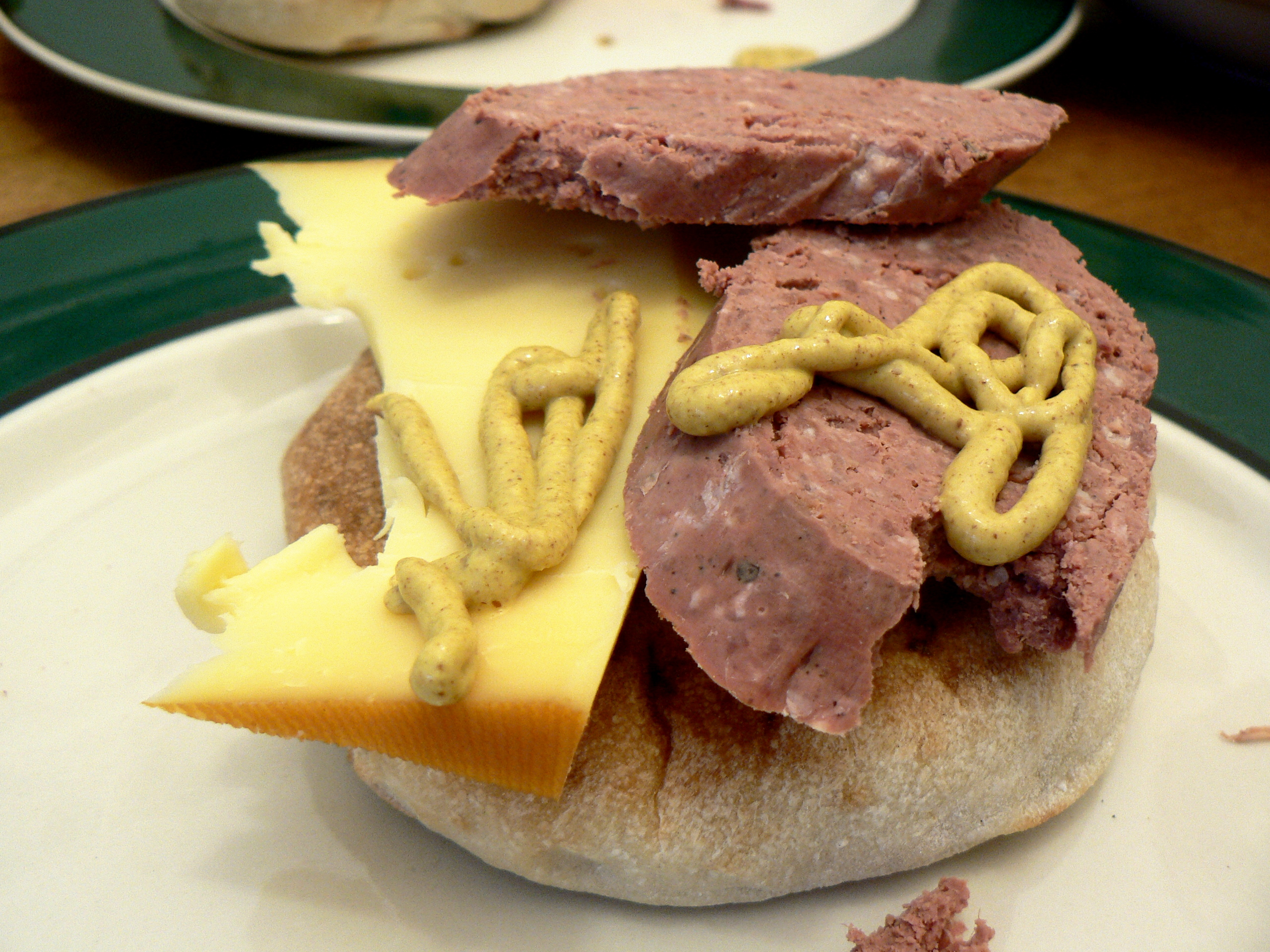
Braunschweiger on bread with cheese and mustard

In the United States and Canada, Braunschweiger refers to a type of pork liver sausage which, if stuffed in natural casings, is almost always smoked. Commercial products often contain smoked bacon, and are stuffed into fibrous casings. Liverwurst (another type of pork liver sausage), however, is never smoked, nor does it contain bacon.

The USDA requires that the product contain a minimum of 30% liver. A typical commercial formula is about 40% pork liver or scalded beef liver, 30% scalded pork jowl, 20% lean pork trimmings and 10% bacon ends and pieces. Added seasonings include salt and often include white pepper, onion powder or chopped onion, and mace. Curing ingredients (sodium erythorbate and sodium nitrite) are optional.

Braunschweiger has a very high amount of vitamin A, iron, protein and fat. The meat has a very soft, spread-like texture and a distinctive spicy liver-based flavor, very similar to the Nordic leverpostej. It is usually used as a spread for toast, but can also be used as a filling for sandwiches, often paired with stone-ground mustard, sliced tomato, onion and cheese. In the Midwestern United States, braunschweiger is typically eaten in a sandwich with various condiments such as ketchup, mustard, and dill pickles, or simply spread on crackers. There are also a few recipes for pâté and cheese balls which use braunschweiger as a primary ingredient. However, pâté is creamier than braunschweiger.

== See also ==
- List of smoked foods
