= Christmas sandwich =

Sandwich of Christmas meal leftovers

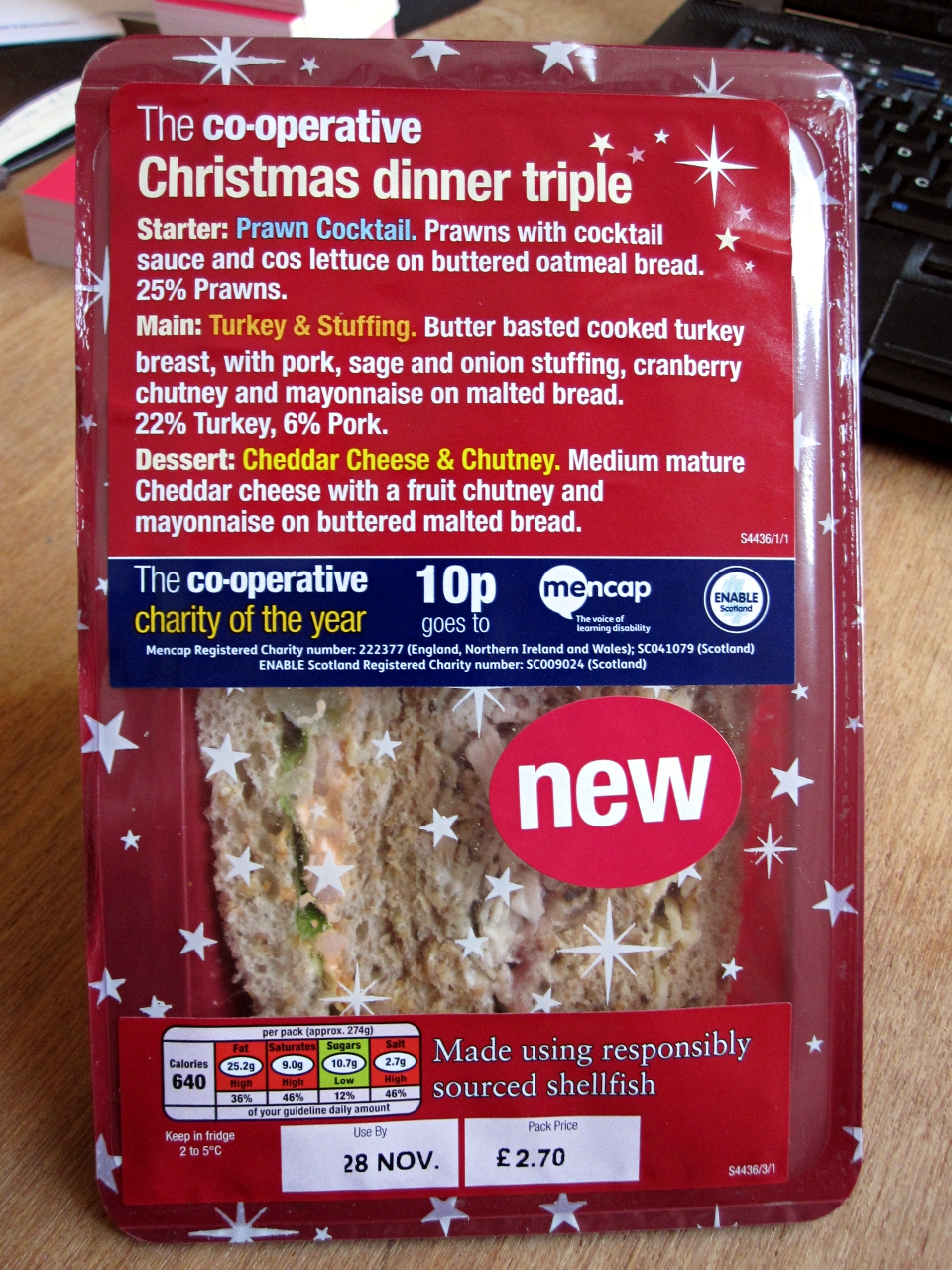
- 2011 Co-op Food 'Christmas dinner triple' sandwich package
- Alternative names: Boxing Day sandwich
- Type: Sandwich, Leftovers
- Associated cuisine: Christmas dinner
- Main ingredients: Bread & leftovers from Christmas dinner
- Similar dishes: Thanksgiving sandwich

A Christmas sandwich or Christmas dinner leftovers sandwich (also sarnie, butty), also known as a Boxing Day sandwich, is a sandwich made of leftovers from Christmas dinner. Popular in the United Kingdom as a seasonal meal, a Christmas sandwich can incorporate various traditional Christmas dinner foods, including Christmas ham, roast turkey, stuffing, and cranberry sauce.

In the 21st century, Christmas sandwiches have become a regular seasonal offering at sandwich shops and chain stores in the UK. In November 2024, a multi-day 'Christmas Sarnie Party' food festival was held in Peckham, London.

== See also ==
- Julmacka, a Swedish Christmas dinner leftover open-faced sandwich
- Thanksgiving sandwich
