= Flæskesteg =

Danish roast pork

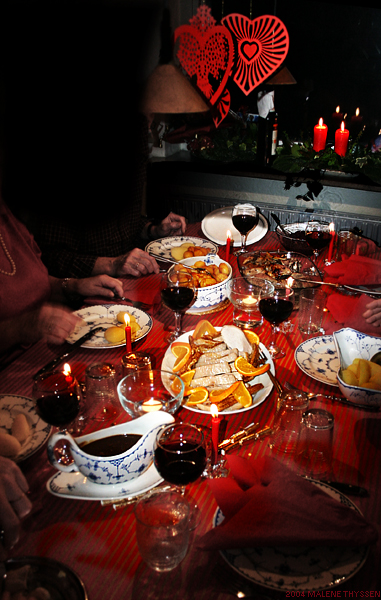
- Flæskesteg with red cabbage and caramelized potatoes served for Christmas dinner
- Place of origin: Denmark
- Main ingredients: Roast pork, crackling

Flæskesteg (Danish pronunciation: ['flɛskə.stɐ̯j]), the Danish version of roast pork, is considered to be one of Denmark's principal national dishes. Always prepared with crackling, it is traditionally on the menu for the Danish Christmas dinner served as the evening meal on Christmas Eve.

== History ==
Pork has been eaten by Danes for centuries, but it was after the Industrial Revolution in the 1860s when wood-fired ovens were introduced for use in the home that, in addition to sausages and hams, roast pork became a common dish. From the beginning, joints were always cooked together with the rind in order to provide crackling. Ever since, this has remained a prerequisite for the dish.

== Traditional recipe ==
The traditional method of preparation is to roast a joint of pork from the breast or neck without removing the rind. So as to obtain crispy crackling, a sharp knife should be used to cut the skin through to the meat in narrow strips. The skin is rubbed with salt, pepper is added, while bay leaves and optionally cloves are inserted into the cuts. The joint is then roasted in a hot oven. The dish is traditionally accompanied by both boiled potatoes and caramelized potatoes (brunede kartofler). The caramelized potatoes are prepared by melting sugar in a frying pan over strong heat, adding a clump of butter, and allowing a portion of small, round, peeled, preboiled potatoes (available in cans) to bathe in the mixture until they become richly browned or caramelized. Red cabbage (rødkål), which can be bought in a jar or a can, is always included too. If the cabbage is prepared from scratch, sliced apples are often added. Many Danes consider the traditional recipe to be the one described by Frk. Jensen in her 1901 cookbook.

== Sandwiches ==
Flæskesteg med rødkål (roast pork with red cabbage) is also served cold on dark Danish rye bread as an open sandwich, known in Denmark as smørrebrød. The thin slice(s) of pork should, of course, be served with their crispy crackling. The sandwich may be decorated with red cabbage, prunes, a slice of orange and pickled cucumber. Hot flæskestegssandwichs in a burger bun are available from many Danish hot dog stands and other fast food providers.

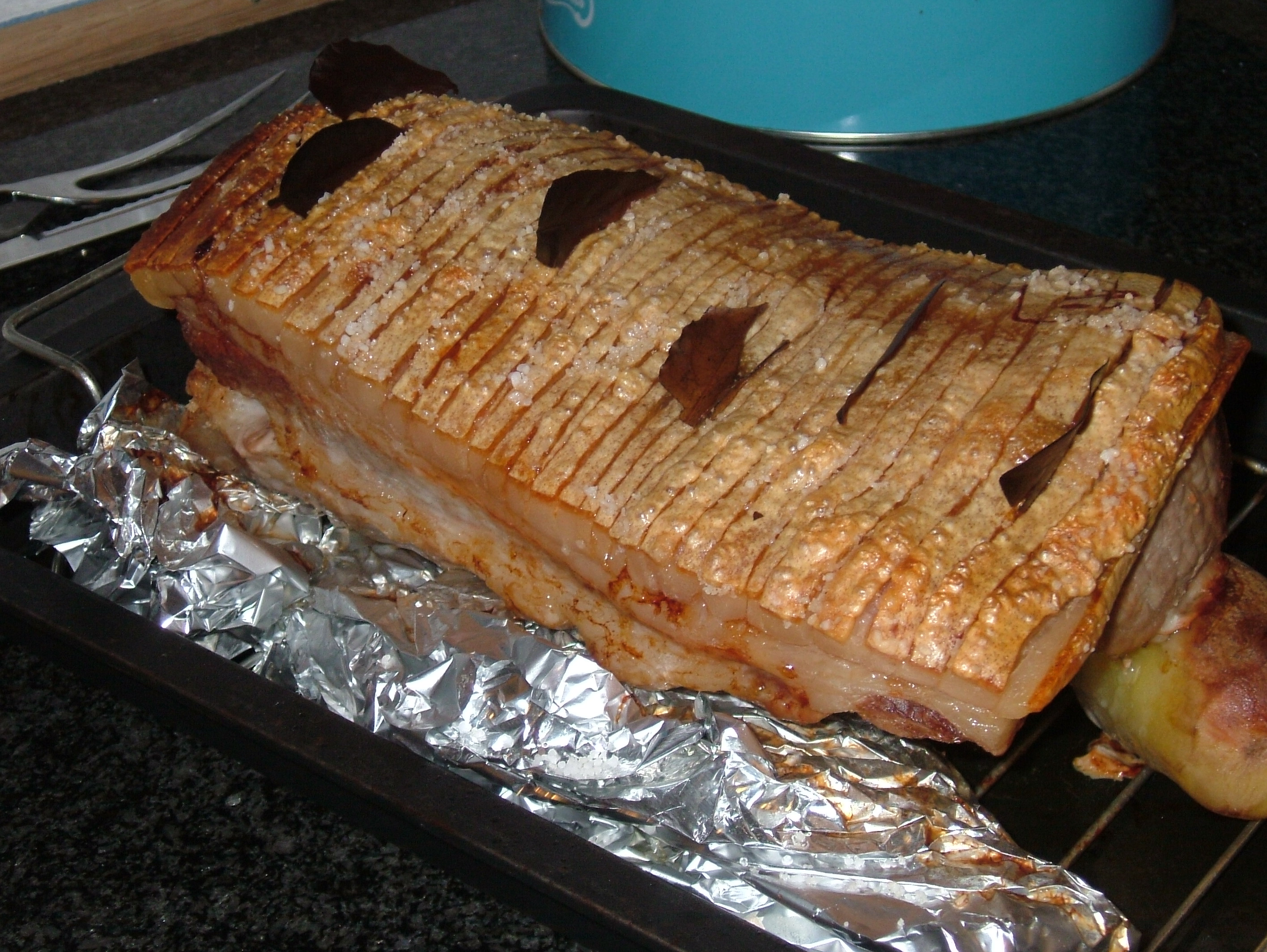
Joint with crackling

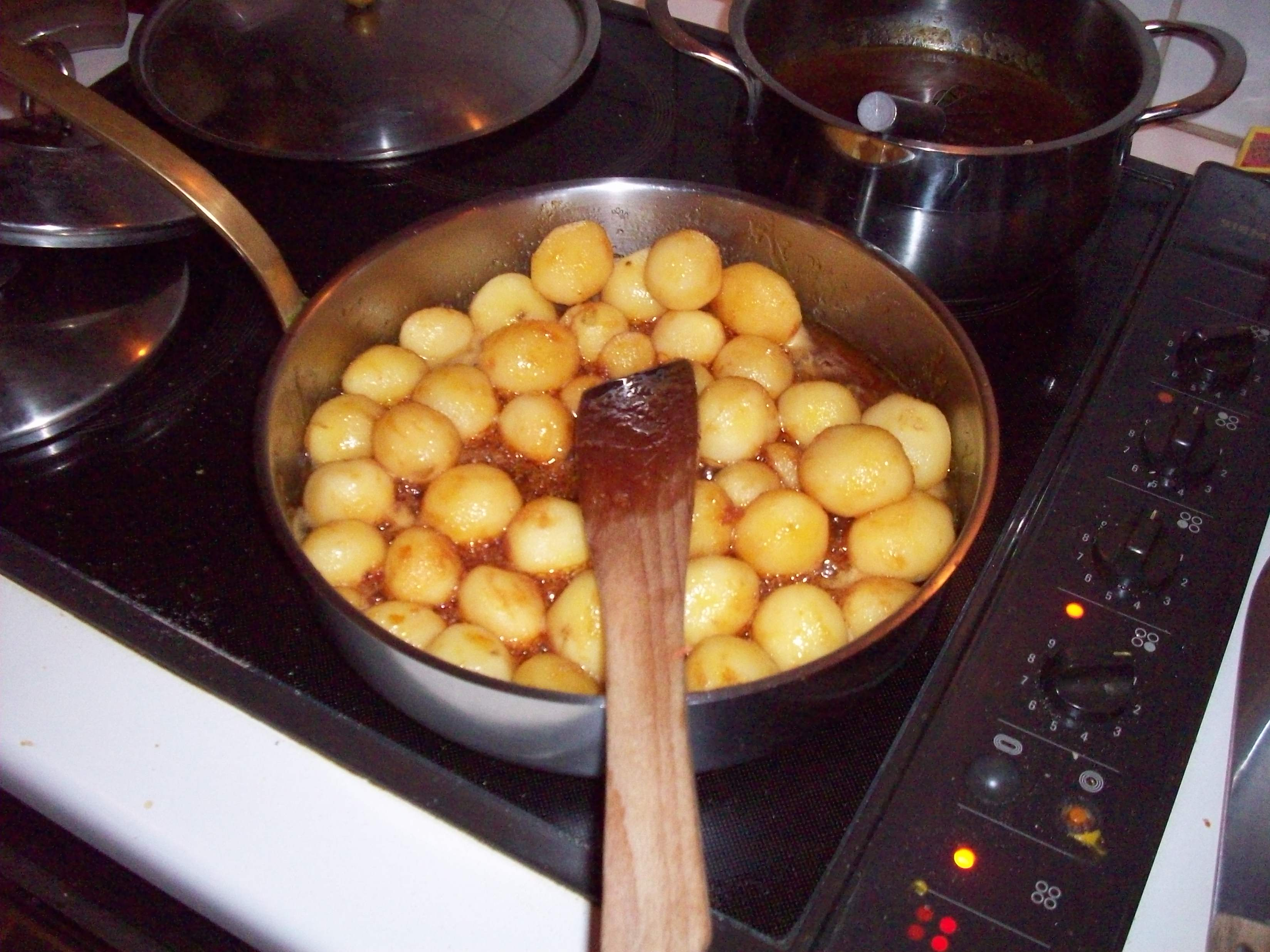
Preparing caramelized potatoes

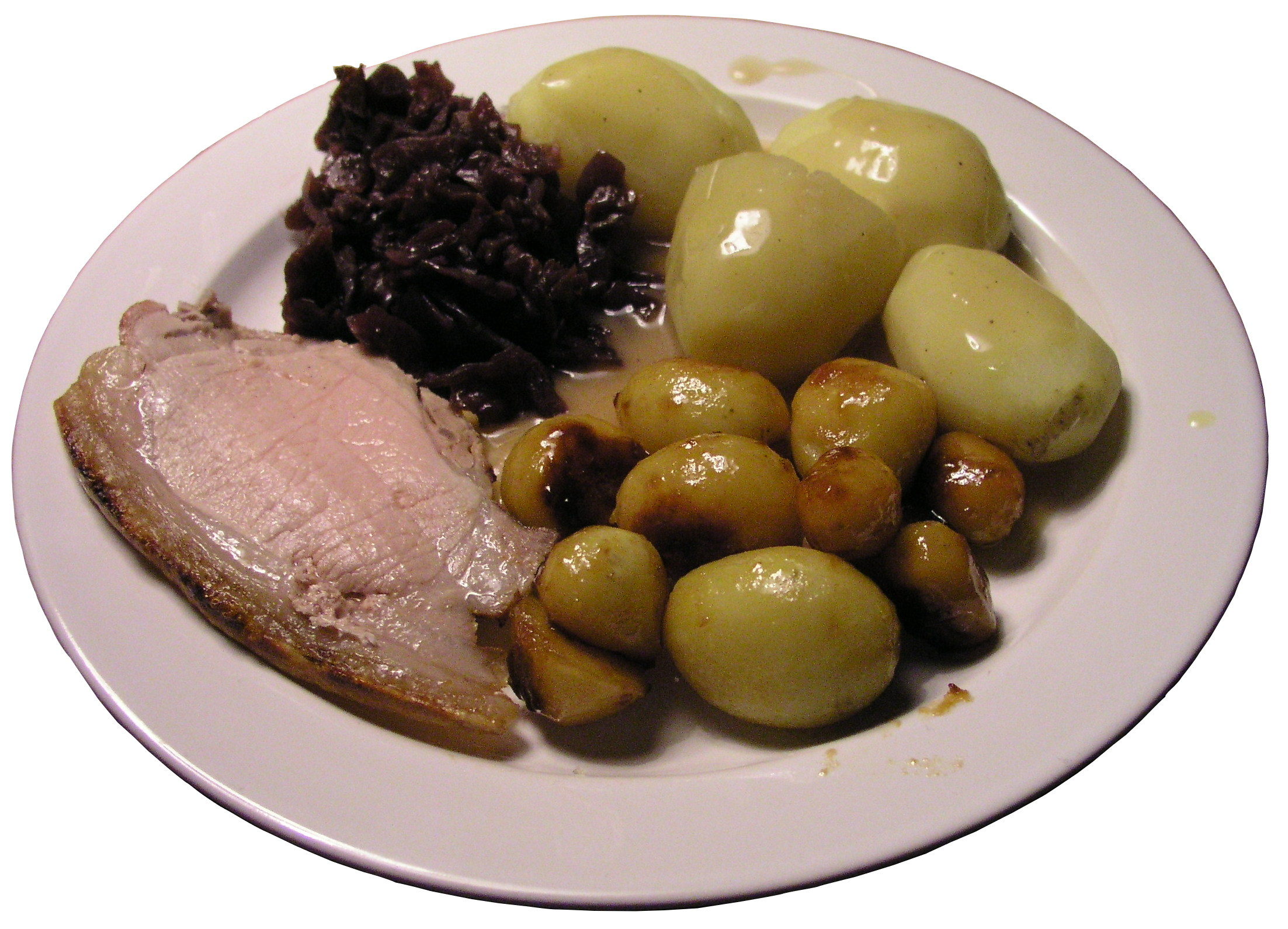
Served with two kinds of potatoes and red cabbage

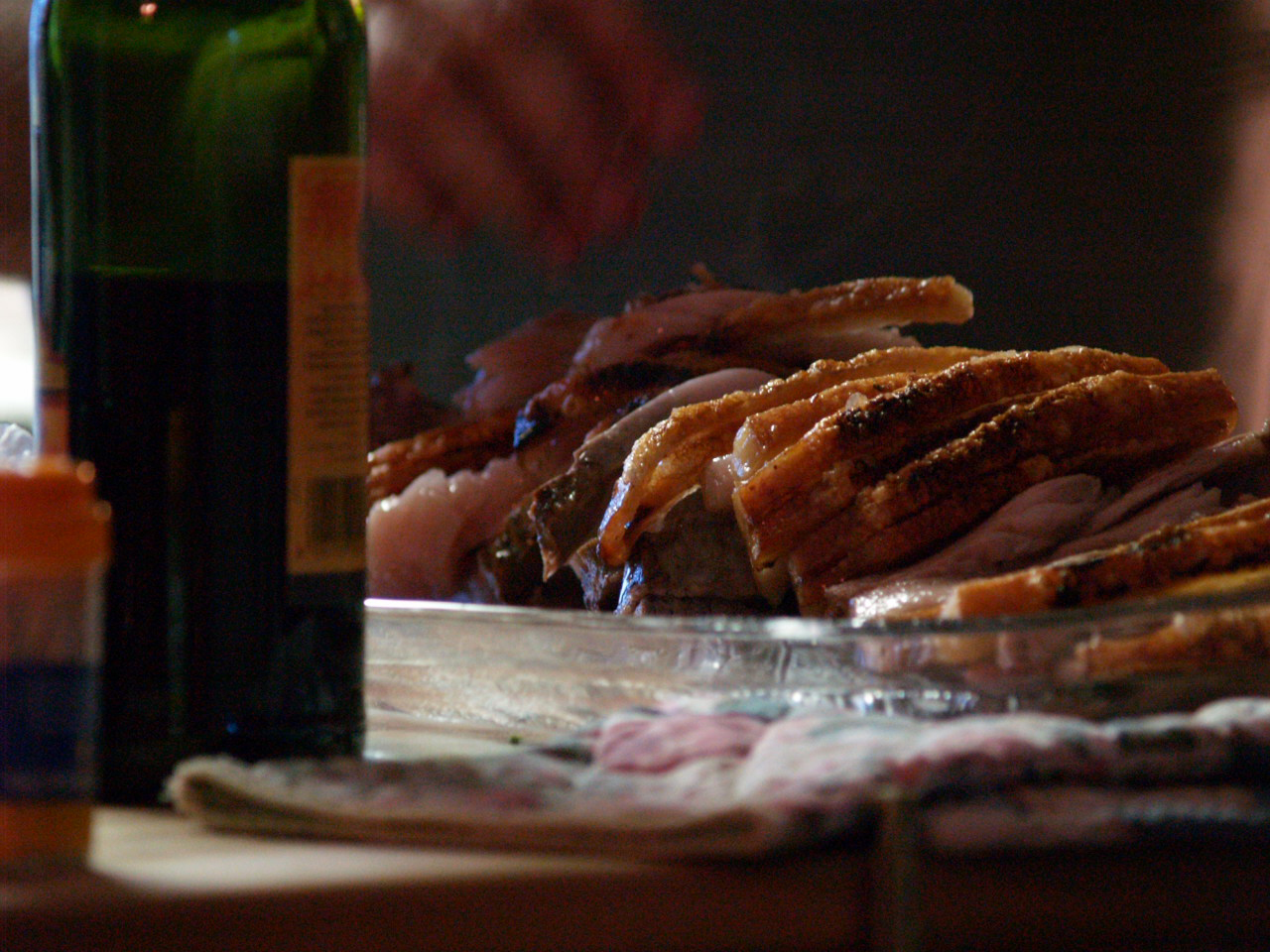
Crispy crackling

== See also ==
- Danish cuisine
- List of pork dishes

== Literature ==
- Jensen, Kristine Marie (edited and updated by Lundsgaard, Bente Nissen and Bloch, Hanne): Frøken Jensens kogebog, Copenhagen, Gyldendal, 2003, 366 p. (in Danish) ISBN 87-00-21271-7
