= Dyrlægens natmad =

Danish open-faced sandwich

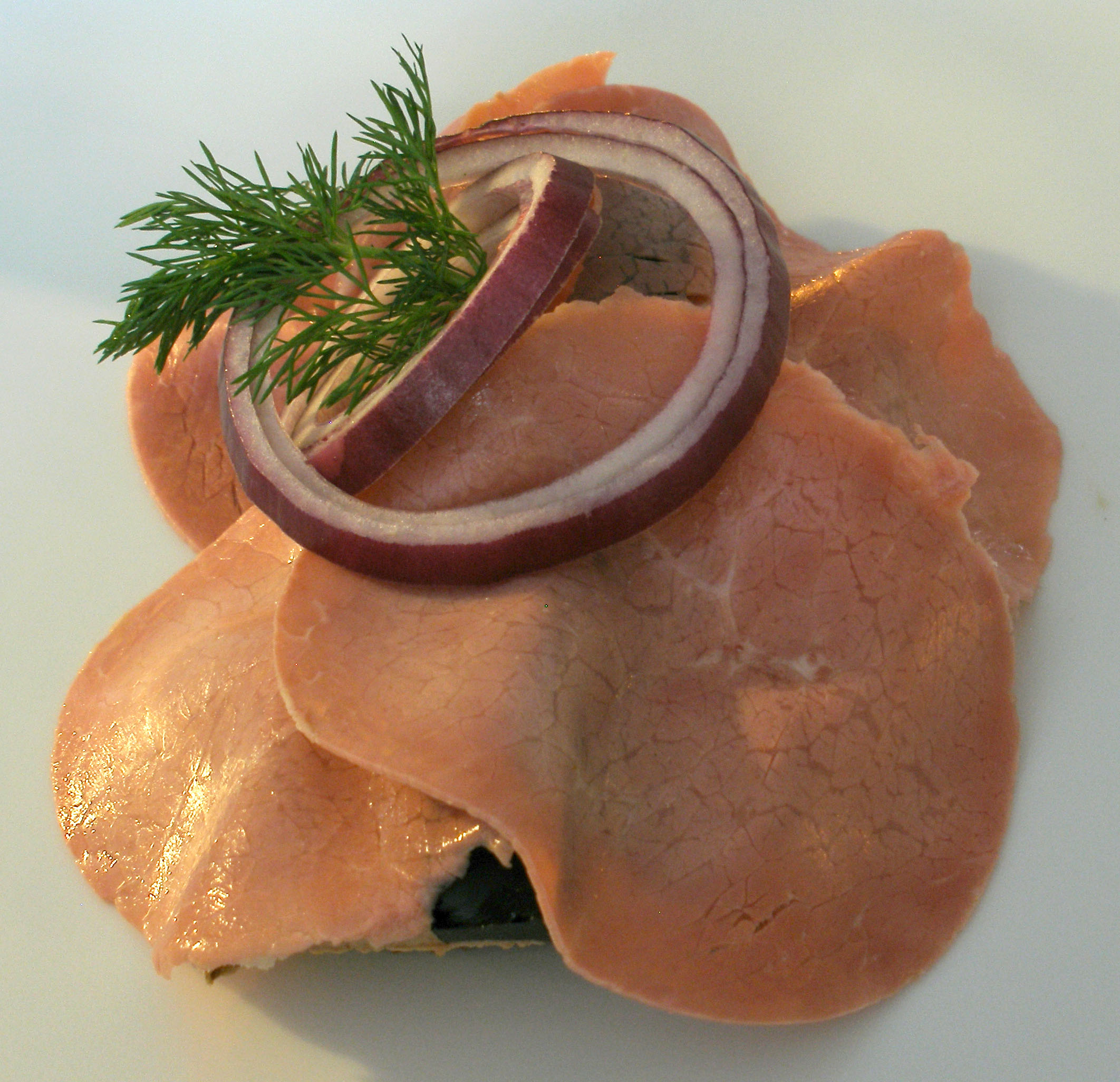
- Type: Sandwich
- Place of origin: Denmark
- Main ingredients: Smørrebrød, meat

Dyrlægens natmad ("veterinarian's night food") is the Danish name for a smørrebrød, also known as an open-faced sandwich, made with a particular selection of toppings. The name of this snack originated in the 1920s in Oskar Davidsen's sandwich bread restaurant in Copenhagen. According to food historian Nina Bauer the famous sandwich is named after one of the restaurant's regulars, a distinguished veterinarian named Sigurd Kejlgaard, who was employed to look after the horses in the royal stables and the contemporary Circus Miehe.

The simplest form of dyrlægens natmad consists of a slice of rugbrød with a base spread of butter or fat, a layer of leverpostej, sliced salt beef, meat stock aspic and slices of red onion and cress on top.

== See also ==
- Danish cuisine
