= Krotekake =

Norwegian flatbread

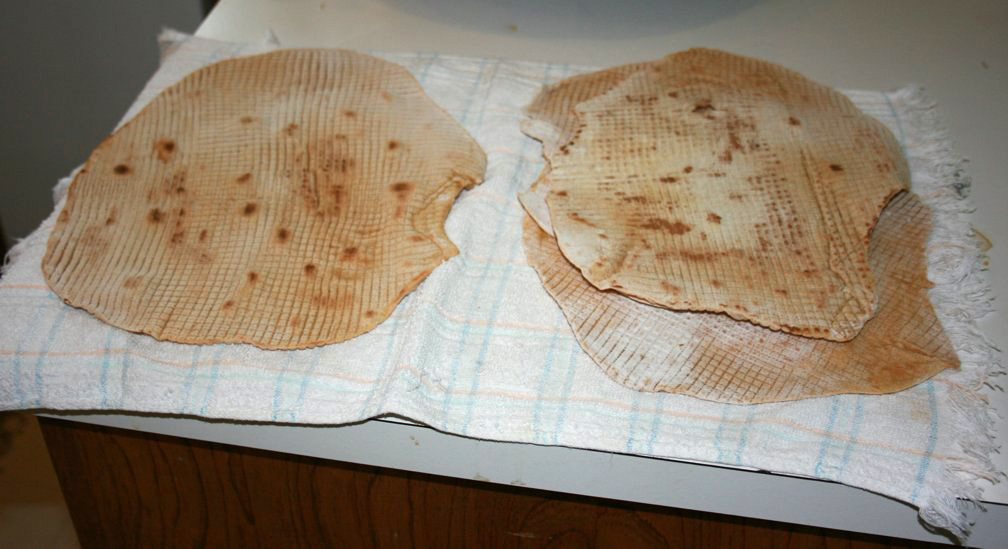
- Type: Flatbread
- Place of origin: Norway
- Region or state: Hardanger
- Main ingredients: Flour, yeast, water

Krotekake is a traditional Norwegian flatbread. It is traditionally associated with the region of Hardanger and is commonly decorated with a cross-hatch pattern. Outside of the region it is often known as hardangerkaker.

Krotekake is a kind of lefse thin pastry. The name lefse covers many different kinds of thin or thick, soft or hard pastry. In the Norwegian language krote means "a scroll" and kake is a cake or pastry. Dried krotekake can be made in quantity and stored without refrigeration for extended periods of time.

== Process ==
The making of krotekake is an opportunity for small gatherings of neighbors in this largely rural fjord coastline. There are typically three or four participants in this activity. The preparation and assembly can take much of the day and provides plenty of time to share stories and catch up on neighborhood information while producing a bounty of staple foodstuff.

The first step in the process is to mix a simple whole-wheat yeast dough and let it rise. A handful of dough approximately 1.5 inches (3.8 cm) in diameter is pulled from the whole. This is formed by turning the edges of the dough-ball down and tucking them into the middle of the bottom of the ball. If the ball feels sticky, the maker adds a dusting of flour. A ball is formed which has been pulled smooth on top and has a dimple on the bottom. The ball is then placed on the floured surface – dimple down. The biscuit maker should have one or two of these finished balls ready so that they have a minute or two to rest before they are rolled.

The roller is responsible for shaping the round. A dough is rolled with a smooth round rolling pin until it is three or four inches (100 mm) in diameter and about 1/2 inch (13 mm) thick. It is then flipped over and rolled again until it is larger and thinner and shaped like a disk. If it appears to be getting sticky it should be flipped onto a new dusting of flour. The round is flipped and rolled and dusted until it is about 1/8 inch thick and twelve inches (300 mm) in diameter. If the round ends up sticking it needs to be scraped off the table or pin and placed back with the mass of dough.

Next the round is rolled with a special rolling pin. The pin has deep grooves about 1/8 inch wide and 1/8 inch apart. It is also cut laterally at 1/8 inch intervals. The rolling pin presses creases into the round but because of the lateral grooves it does not cut the round into ribbons of dough. This rolling pin is firmly rolled across the round and then again at right angles to the original direction leaving a cross-hatch pattern which seals the top and bottom surfaces of the round to each other. The round may also be slightly sealed to the tabletop. A lefse stick is a thin, flat, wooden stick with straight sides about 2 feet (0.61 m) long and 1½ inches wide which has been sanded smooth. This stick is used to slide under the krotekake to release it from the floured surface. It is also used to scrape the table or pin clean of dough.

The same person who rolls the dough thin usually cuts the round with the Hardanger rolling pin. Since the making of krotekake is a social event as well as a cooking technique, the role of using this special rolling pin is sometimes delegated to a guest or child who is just learning the tradition.

The cook takes the scored round from the table and places it on a hot (~400 °F) flat grill. Thee cook is responsible for grill temperature which be determined by the amount of time a drop of water takes to boil off. The grill is not oiled but relies on an excess of flour to prevent any sticking. The burnt flour must be periodically brushed off. In a traditional oven, the round must be tossed onto the grill since there is no room to place it carefully.

Each of these steps takes approximately the same amount of time. This means the team can get into a rhythm where their work and conversation are in sync. A fourth member if available usually stacks the drying product, and divides it into shares for the participants. Team members can frequently exchange roles depending on their preferences.

In Hardanger, many dwellings have a special arched oven in a separate building in which the Krotekake is cooked. The separate building is a guard against a house fire. The arched oven reflects the heat of the fire and so the Krotekake cooks on both sides at the same time. There is no need to flip it.
