= Liver pâté =

Meat dish from Europe

Liver pate
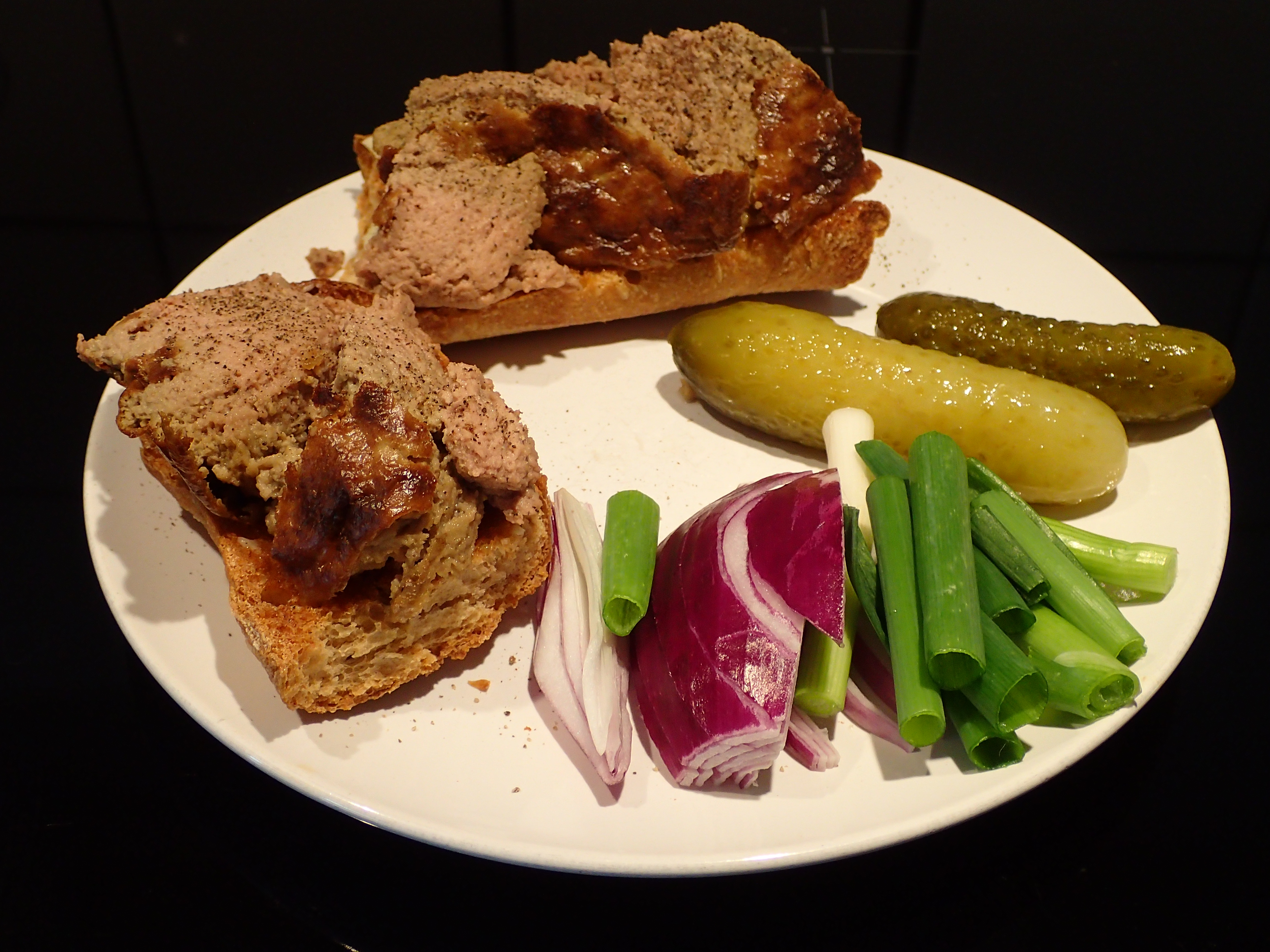
- Liver pâté on toasted, buttered bread with accompaniments
- Type: Spread
- Place of origin: France
- Region or state: Northern and Eastern Europe
- Serving temperature: Warm or cold
- Main ingredients: Ground pork liver, lard
- Variations: Ground chicken liver

Liver pate is a pâté and meat spread popular in Northern and Eastern Europe. Made from finely or coarsely ground pork liver and lard, it is similar to certain types of French and Belgian pâtés.

== Scandinavia ==
Liver pâté is a popular food item in Scandinavia, where it is known as leverpostej (Denmark), leverpostei (Norway), leverpastej (Sweden) and lifrarkæfa (Iceland). It is made from a mixture of pork liver, lard (or fatback), onion, flour, egg, salt, pepper and spices, poured into a loaf pan and then baked in the oven. The liver is usually finely ground, but coarsely ground variations are also made. Typical spices include allspice and some recipes also include a small amount of cured anchovy. In Norway, leverpostei is made with a bit of pork meat.

Leverpostej is served with bread in a variety of ways. It is served both hot and cold and can be bought premade in supermarkets, butcher shops and delicatessens.

Baguette and rugbrød with leverpostej

A popular everyday version is to spread cold leverpostej on a slice of rugbrød (Danish dark wholemeal rye bread) and eat it as a simple open-faced sandwich. More extravagant variations include the smørrebrød known as Dyrlægens natmad. Swedes often use it on crispbread. It may be topped with a variety of accompaniments, such as pickled beets or cucumbers, raw onions, fried onions, fried bacon or slices of fresh cucumber.

Warm servings of leverpostej are eaten with either rugbrød or white bread and traditionally accompanied by pickled beets or gherkins and either fried bacon or sautéed mushrooms.

In Denmark, leverpostej was introduced in 1847 by the Frenchman François Louis Beauvais in Copenhagen. At that time it was considered a luxury dish, and was expensive. Today, it is a common and affordable food item. In two 1992 surveys, Danes ranked leverpostej as their favorite sandwich topping. Stryhn's is one of the main producers in Denmark with 85,000 units produced daily. The company was established in 1945 on the isle of Amager, east of Copenhagen.

== See also ==
- Braunschweiger (sausage)
- Chopped liver
- Foie gras
- List of spreads
- Liverwurst
- Offal
