= Ribberull =

Norwegian seasoned meat roll

Ribberull is a Norwegian seasoned meat roll. It consists of pork ribs boned, flattened, sewn to form a long rectangle, rolled, pressed, and steamed. A seasoned filling is spread over it before it is rolled, often containing a variety of peppers and spices blended with a paste of nuts and/or dried fruits. It can be served as a cold cut or as a hot dish. It is similar in concept to Danish rullepølse and Swedish rullsylta.

== See also ==
- List of pork dishes
