= Smørrebrød =

Open-faced sandwich

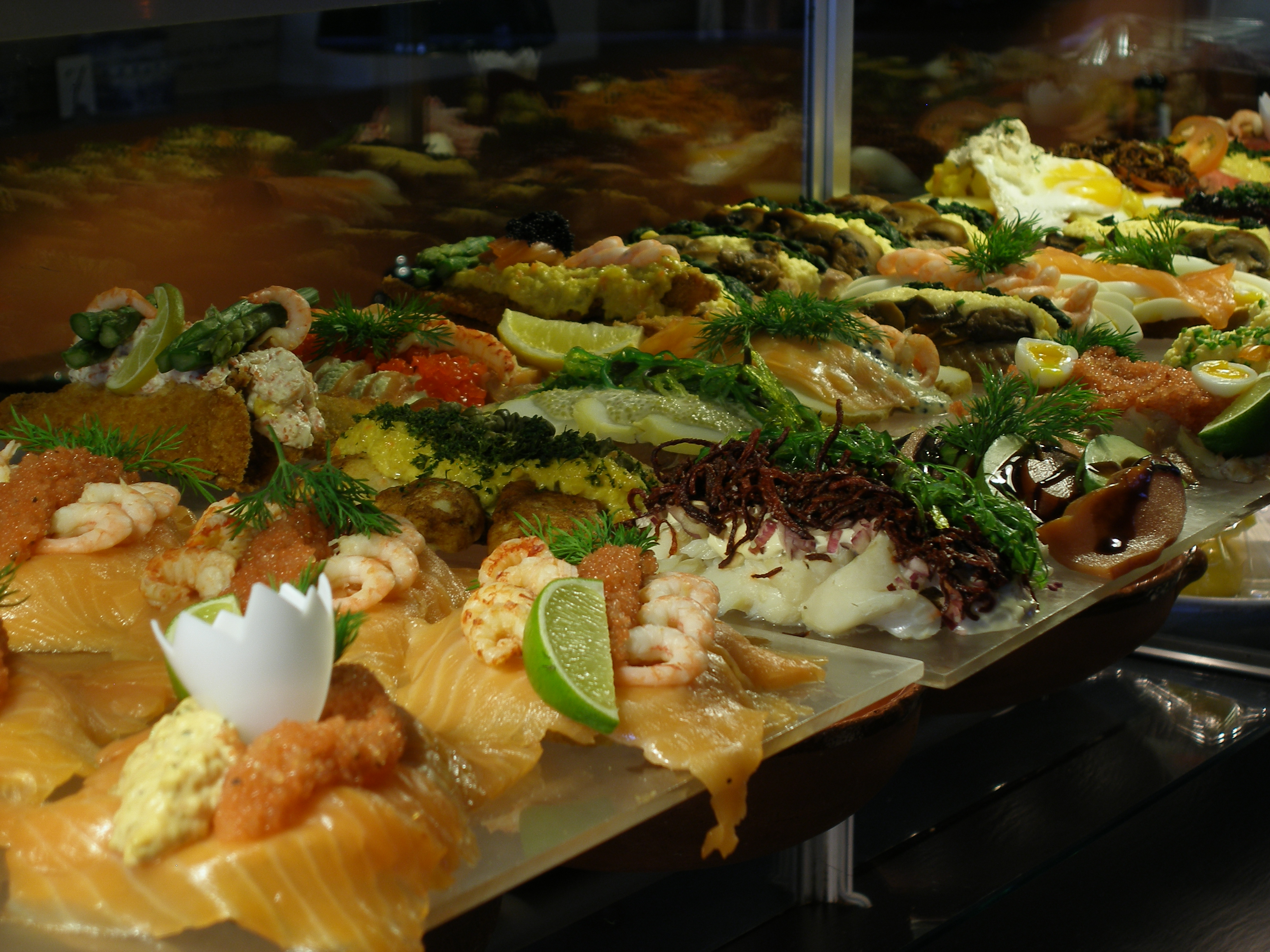
- A selection of Danish smørrebrød. Here, dark rye bread covered with salmon topped with either remoulade or prawns. In the background are other kinds.
- Type: Open sandwich
- Place of origin: Scandinavia
- Region or state: Northern Europe
- Main ingredients: Rugbrød, butter, cold cuts, pieces of meat or fish, cheese, spreads, and garnishes.

Smørrebrød (Danish pronunciation: [ˈsmɶɐ̯ˌpʁœðˀ]; originally smør og brød, "butter and bread"), smørbrød "butter bread" (Norwegian), or smörgås [ˈsmœrˌɡoːs] "butter goose" (Swedish), is a traditional open-faced sandwich in the cuisines of Denmark, Norway and Sweden that usually consists of a piece of buttered rugbrød (a dense, dark rye bread) topped with commercial or homemade cold cuts, pieces of meat or fish, cheese or spreads, and garnishes.

== Bread ==
Bread is a very important part of the Scandinavian diet, primarily rugbrød, which is sourdough rye bread. It is a dark, heavy bread which is often bought sliced, in varieties from light-coloured rye to very dark, and from refined to whole-grain. Some toppings are served on franskbrød ('French bread'), a very light, crusty wheat bread. The bread is usually buttered, though for some variants, a spread of lard is customary.

== Toppings ==
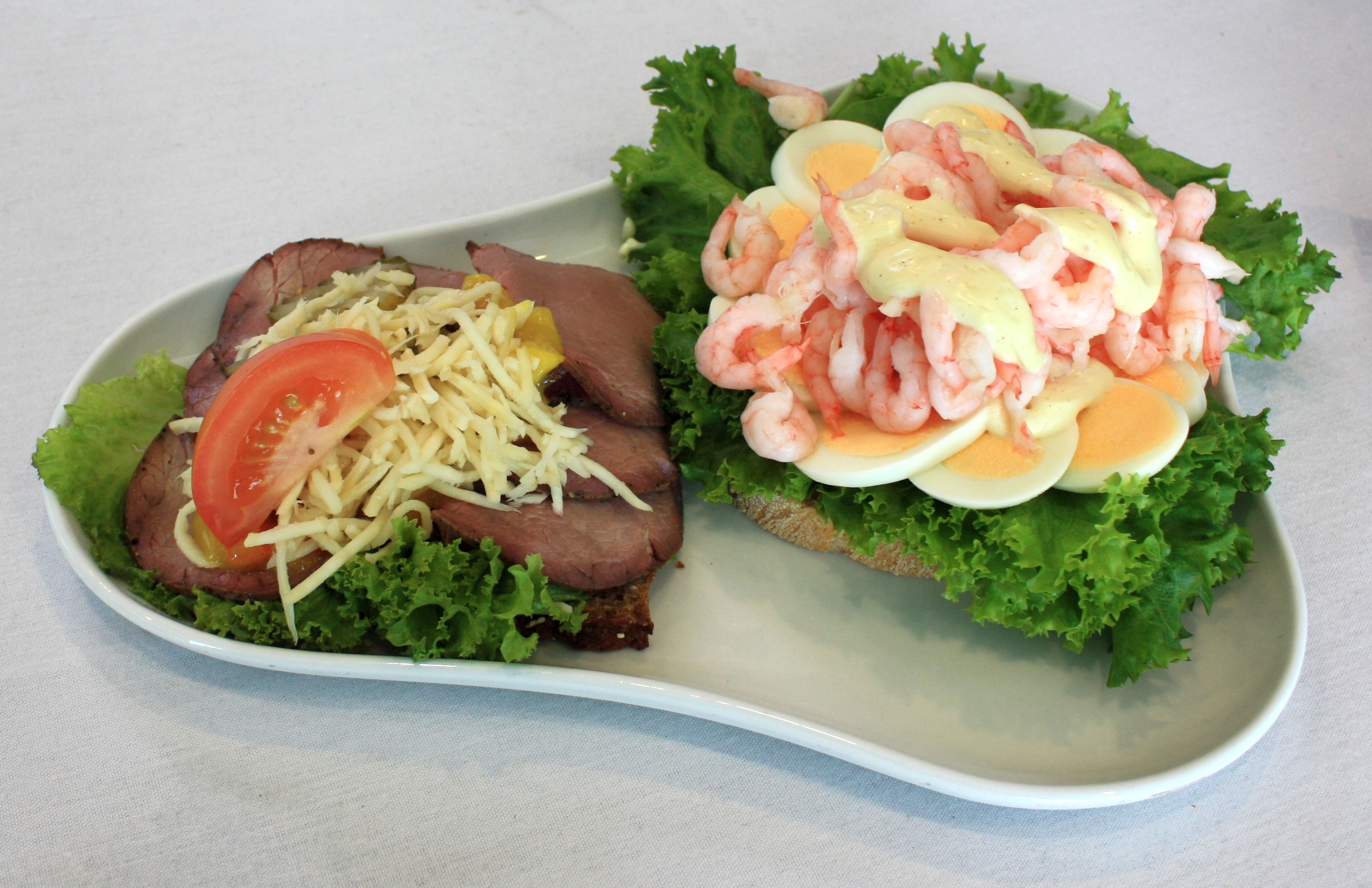
Smørrebrød. Left: Roast beef with remoulade, tomato and shredded horseradish on Danish rye bread; right: egg, prawns, lemon and mayonnaise on white bread.

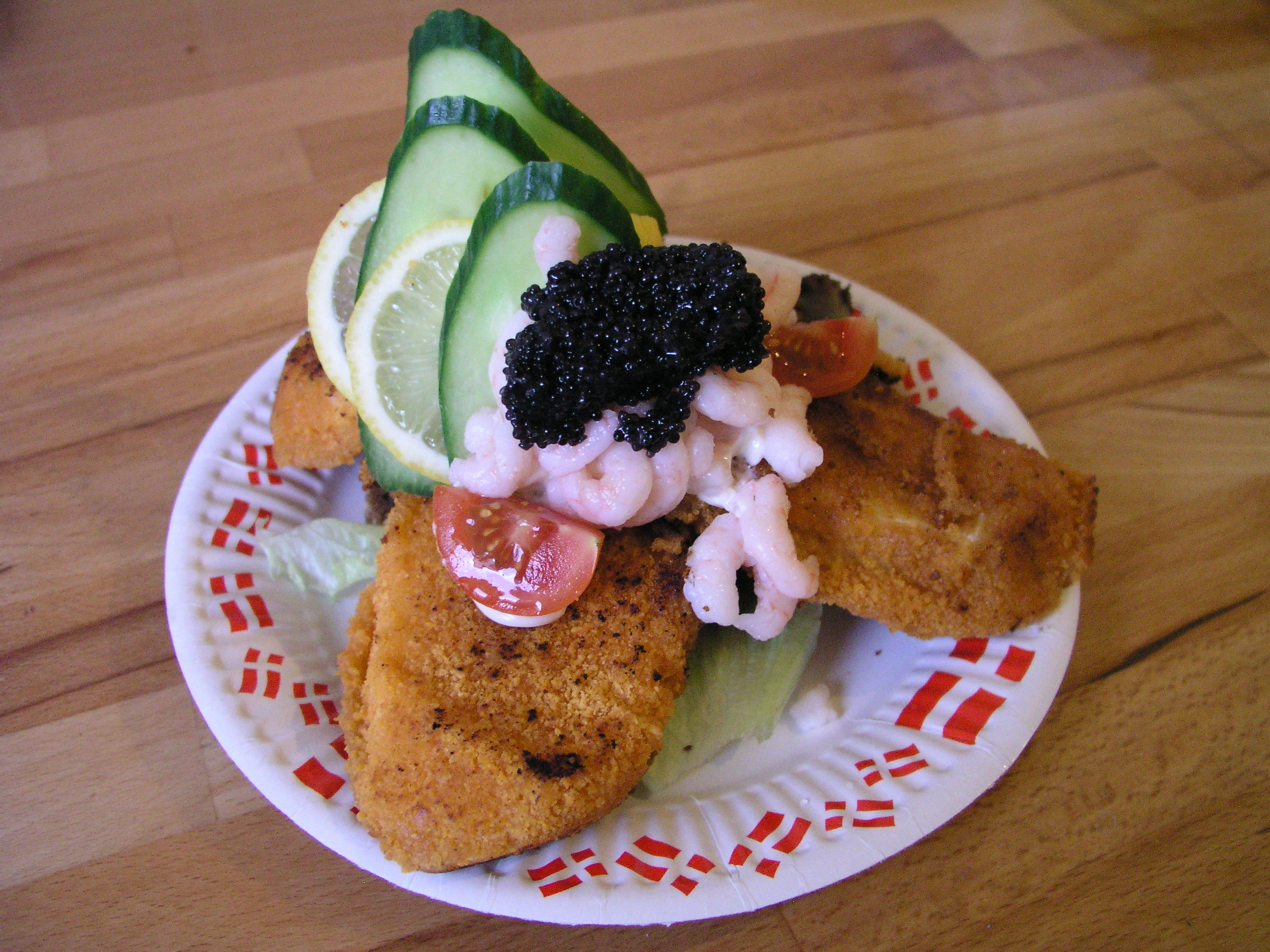
Dark rye bread topped with breaded fish, salad, cucumber, shrimp, black lumpfish roe, and tomato

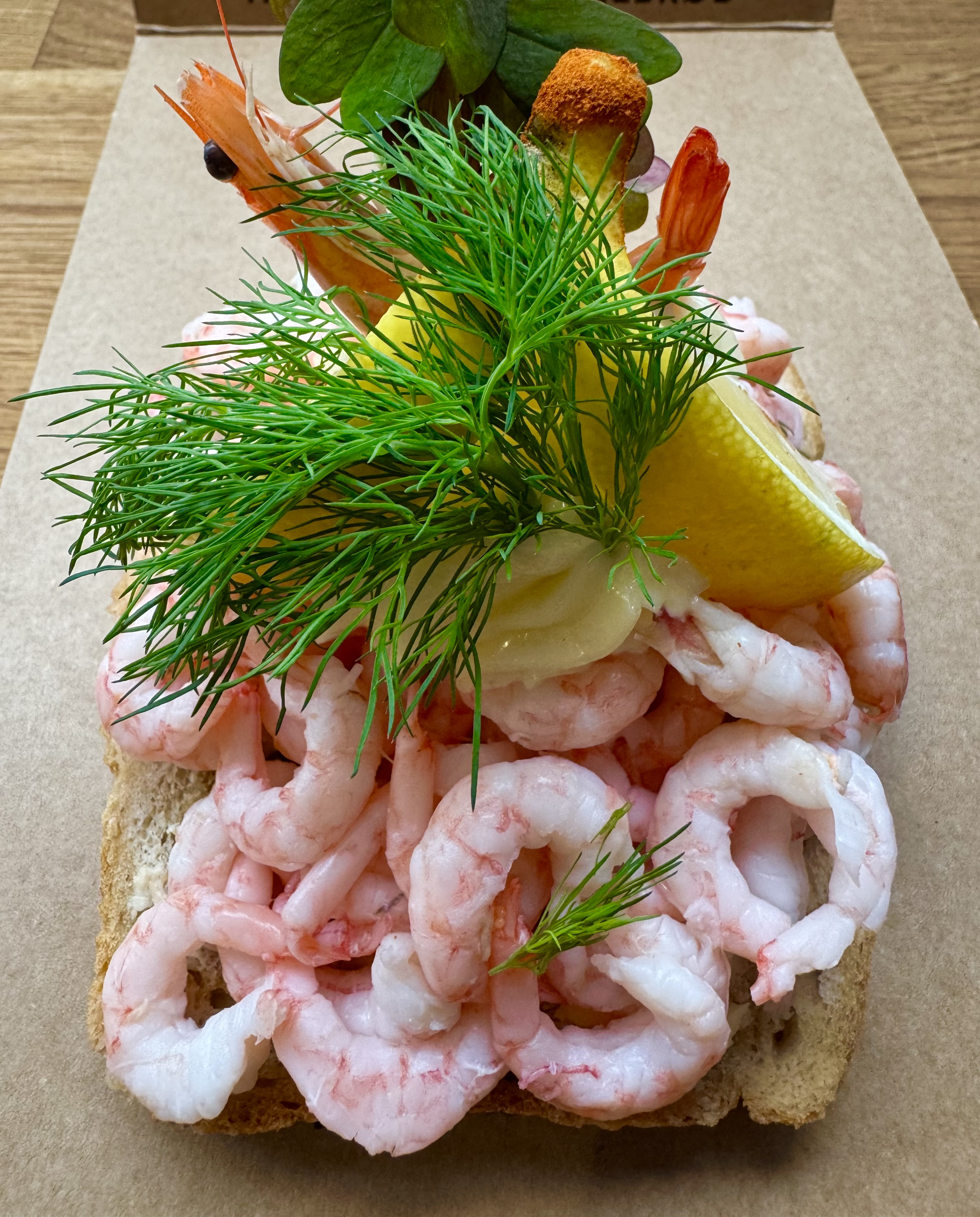
Shrimp on French bread. Torvehallerne Copenhagen, Denmark

Traditional toppings include pickled herring (plain, spiced or curried), slightly sweeter than Dutch or German herring; thinly sliced cheese in many varieties; sliced cucumber, tomato and boiled eggs; pork liver-paste; dozens of types of cured or processed meat in thin slices, or smoked fish such as salmon; mackerel in tomato sauce; pickled cucumber; boiled egg, and rings of red onion. Mayonnaise mixed with peas, sliced boiled asparagus and diced carrot, called italiensk salat ('Italian salad'), remoulade or other thick sauces often top the layered open sandwich, which is usually eaten with utensils. It is customary to pass the dish of sliced bread around the table, and then to pass around each dish of toppings, from which people help themselves.

More festive meals can be loosely divided into courses: fish toppings first (such as herring, shrimp, or smoked salmon) followed by cold cuts and salads, and finally cheese with bread or crackers and fruit. One or several warm dishes are often served with the meats on special occasions, such as breaded plaice filet, fried medister sausage, frikadeller with pickled red cabbage, or mørbradbøf (pork tenderloin with sauteed onions or a creamy mushroom sauce). Toppings change with the seasons and some are mostly associated with Easter or Christmas lunches, like head cheese and æbleflæsk (lit. 'apple pork', roast pork or bacon in apple sauce). Summer offers lighter fare such as smoked mackerel, sommersalat (lit. 'summer salad', radish and cucumber in a smoked cheese dressing), new potatoes, and freshly peeled shrimp.

Hundreds of combinations and varieties of smørrebrød are available, and some traditional examples include:

- Dyrlægens natmad (Danish: 'veterinarian's midnight snack') – on a piece of dark rye bread, a layer of liver pâté, topped with a slice of salt beef and a slice of meat aspic. This is all garnished with raw onion rings and garden cress.
- Eel – smoked eel on dark rye bread, topped with scrambled eggs and sliced radishes or chopped chives.
- Leverpostej – warm rough-chopped liver pâté served on dark rye bread, topped with bacon, and sautéed mushrooms.
- Roast beef – thinly sliced and served on dark rye bread, topped with a portion of remoulade, and decorated with a sprinkling of shredded horseradish and toasted onion.
- Eggs and prawns – Thin slices of egg and prawns on either rye bread or white bread topped with tomato, mayonnaise, and lemon, and garnished with garden cress.
- Roast pork – thinly sliced and served on dark rye bread, topped with red sweet and sour cabbage and thinly sliced pickles and garnished with a slice of orange.
- Salmon – slices of cold-smoked salmon or gravlax (cured salmon) on white bread, topped with shrimp and garnished with a slice of lemon and fresh dill.
- Spiced meat roll – thin-sliced cold cut, garnished with a thick slice of sky, raw onion rings and garden cress.
- Julmacka (pl. julmackor, transl. Christmas sandwich) – a Christmas sandwich made from the leftovers of a traditional Swedish Christmas dinner, or julbord; common ingredients include Swedish meatballs, Swedish Christmas ham, and beetroot salad.
- Stjerneskud (lit. "shooting star") – on a base of buttered white bread, two pieces of fish: a piece of steamed white fish on one half, a piece of fried, battered plaice on the other half. On top is piled a mound of shrimp, which is then garnished with a dollop of mayonnaise, red caviar, and a lemon slice.
- Tartar – raw lean beef mince with salt and pepper, served on dark rye bread, topped with raw onion rings, grated horseradish and a raw egg yolk.

== See also ==
- Butterbrot
- Smörgåsbord
- Tapas
- Chlebíček

== Literature ==
- Katrine Klinken, Smørrebrød – Danish open, Thaning & Appel, 2008.
- Ida Davidsen and Mia Davidsen, Open your heart to the Danish open... the Davidsen dynasty and their best recipes, Lindhardt og Ringhof, 2006. ISBN 978-87-614-0400-8.
- Inge Lotz, Danish open sandwiches, Aschehoug Fakta, 1997. ISBN 87-7512-668-0.
- Troelsø, Ole (2012), Smørrebrød i Danmark - Stederne, stykkerne og historien, København: Forlaget Lucullus, ISBN 9788799551606.
