= Norwegian cuisine =

Culinary traditions of Norway

Norwegian cuisine (Norwegian: Norsk mat) in its traditional form is based largely on the raw materials readily available in Norway. It differs in many respects from continental cuisine with a stronger focus on game and fish. Many of the traditional dishes are the result of using conserved materials because of the long winters.

Modern Norwegian cuisine, although still strongly influenced by its traditional background, has been influenced by globalization: pasta, spicebags, pizza, burgers, fries, soda, martinis, tacos, and the like are as common as meatballs and cod as staple foods.

== Typical main meals ==
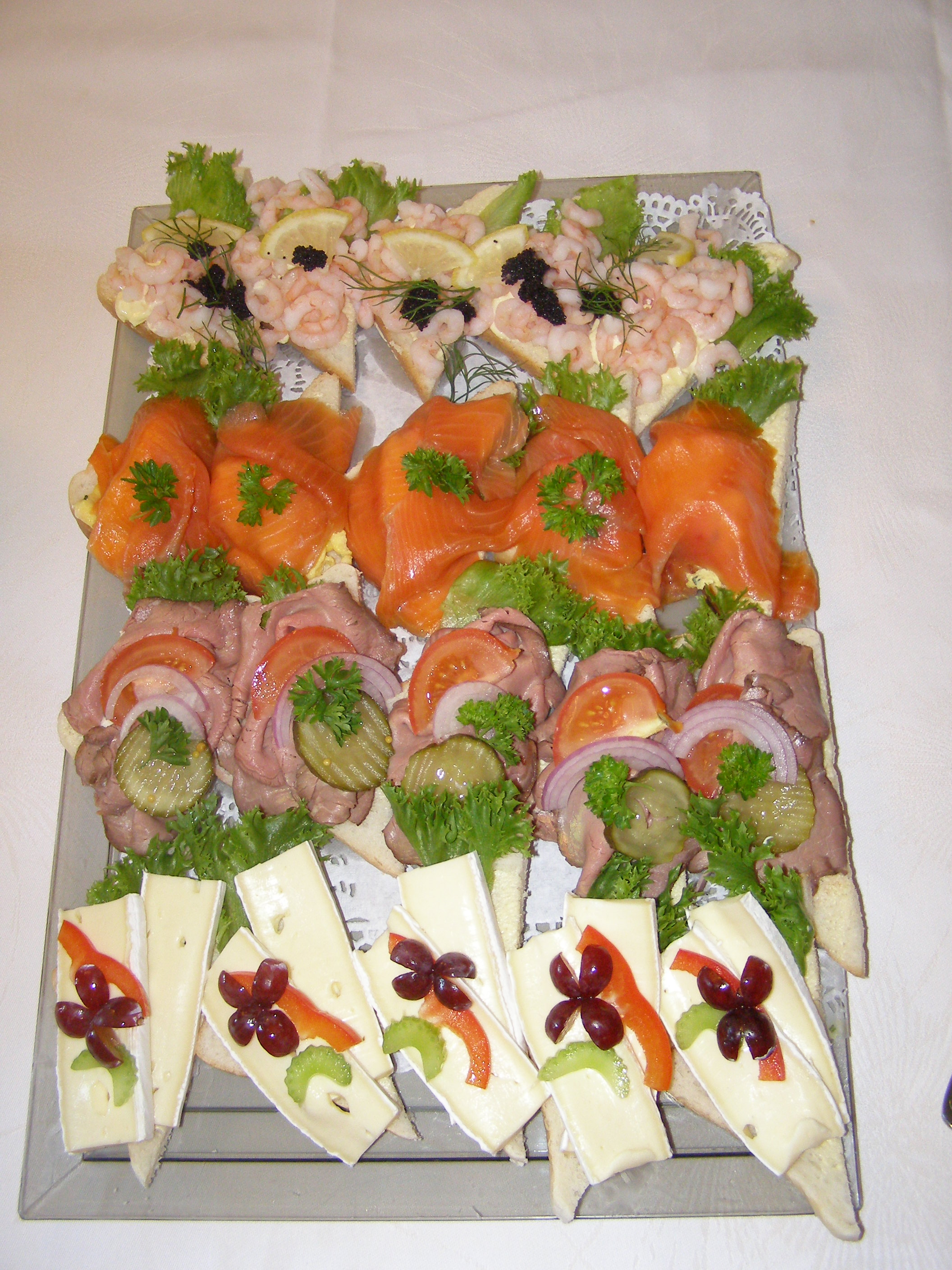
Smørbrød, an open Norwegian sandwich

=== Breakfast (frokost) ===
The Norwegian breakfast consists of bread, berries, cheese, and milk. Traditionally this meal included a porridge such as grøt (flour and groats boiled with milk). Different kinds of grøt exist, including rømmegrøt (regular grøt but milk is replaced with sour cream) and risgrøt (regular grøt with rice instead of groats)

=== Lunch (lunsj) ===
For most Norwegians, a weekday packed lunch usually consists of very simple open-faced sandwiches known as matpakke (lit. 'lunchbox'), with each slice separated with smaller sheets of wax paper called mellomleggspapir. More extensive open-faced sandwiches (with multiple toppings) are considered smørbrød.

Cafeterias commonly feature salad bars, warm meals, and dairy products like yogurt, skyr and kvarg.

=== Dinner (middag) ===
Norwegians usually eat dinner starting around 4–7 PM. This is the most important meal of the day and typically includes carbohydrate-rich foods such as potatoes and protein-rich foods such as meat or fish.

=== Evening meal (kveldsmat) ===
Norwegians frequently eat a very small meal later in the evening before bed. This may consist of foods similar to what is prepared for breakfast.

== Meat ==
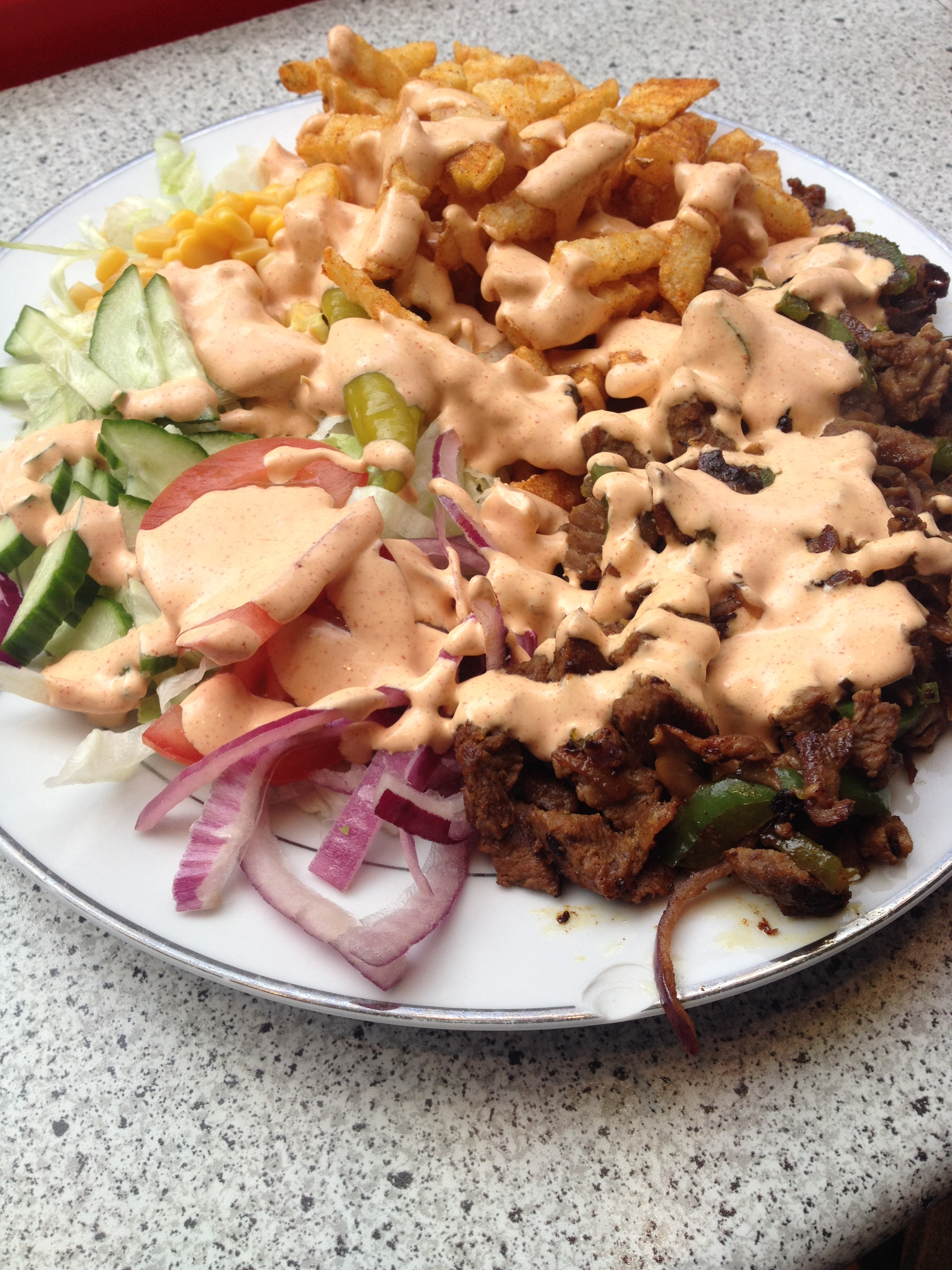
Biffsnadder

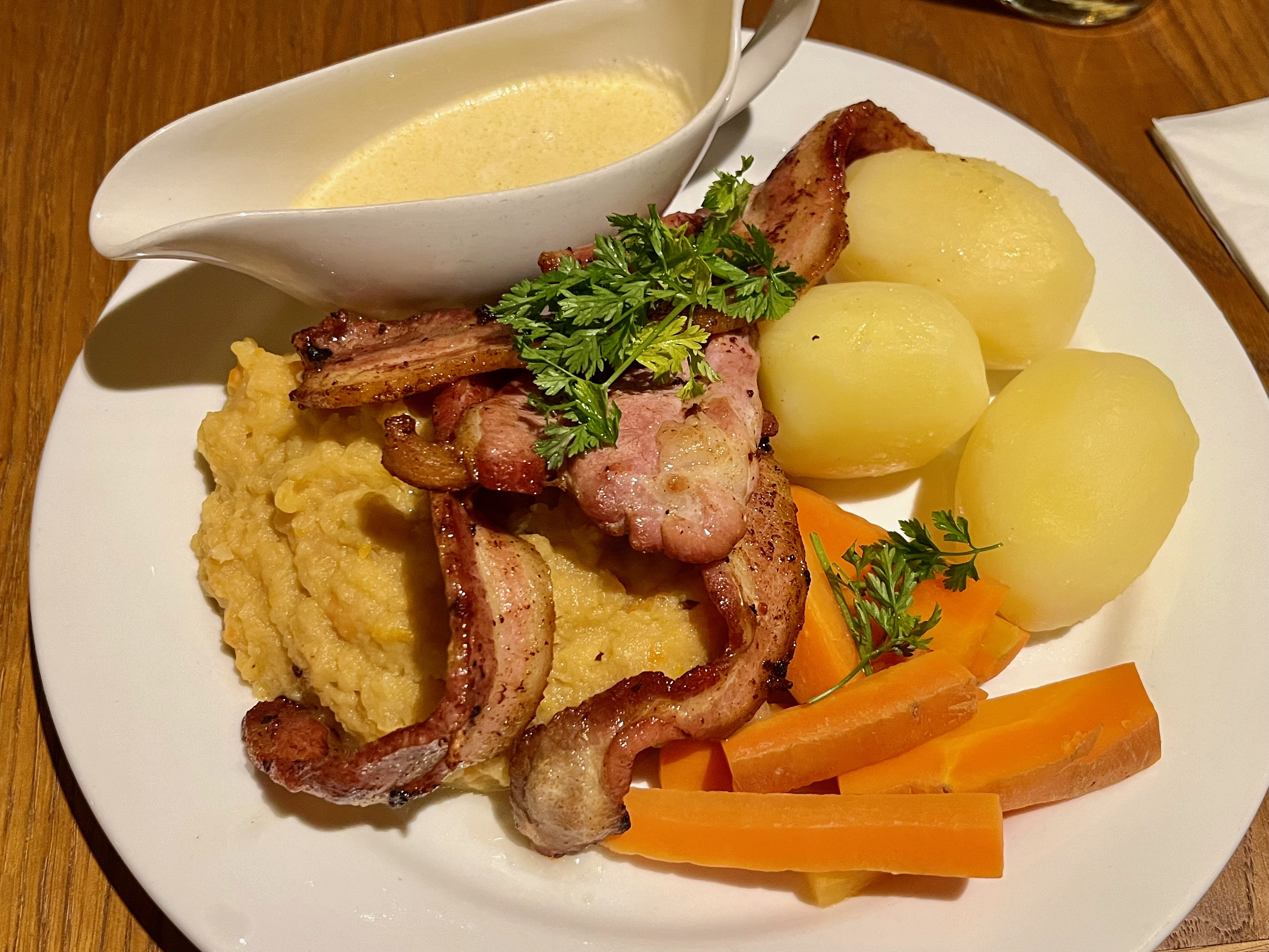
Flesk og duppe

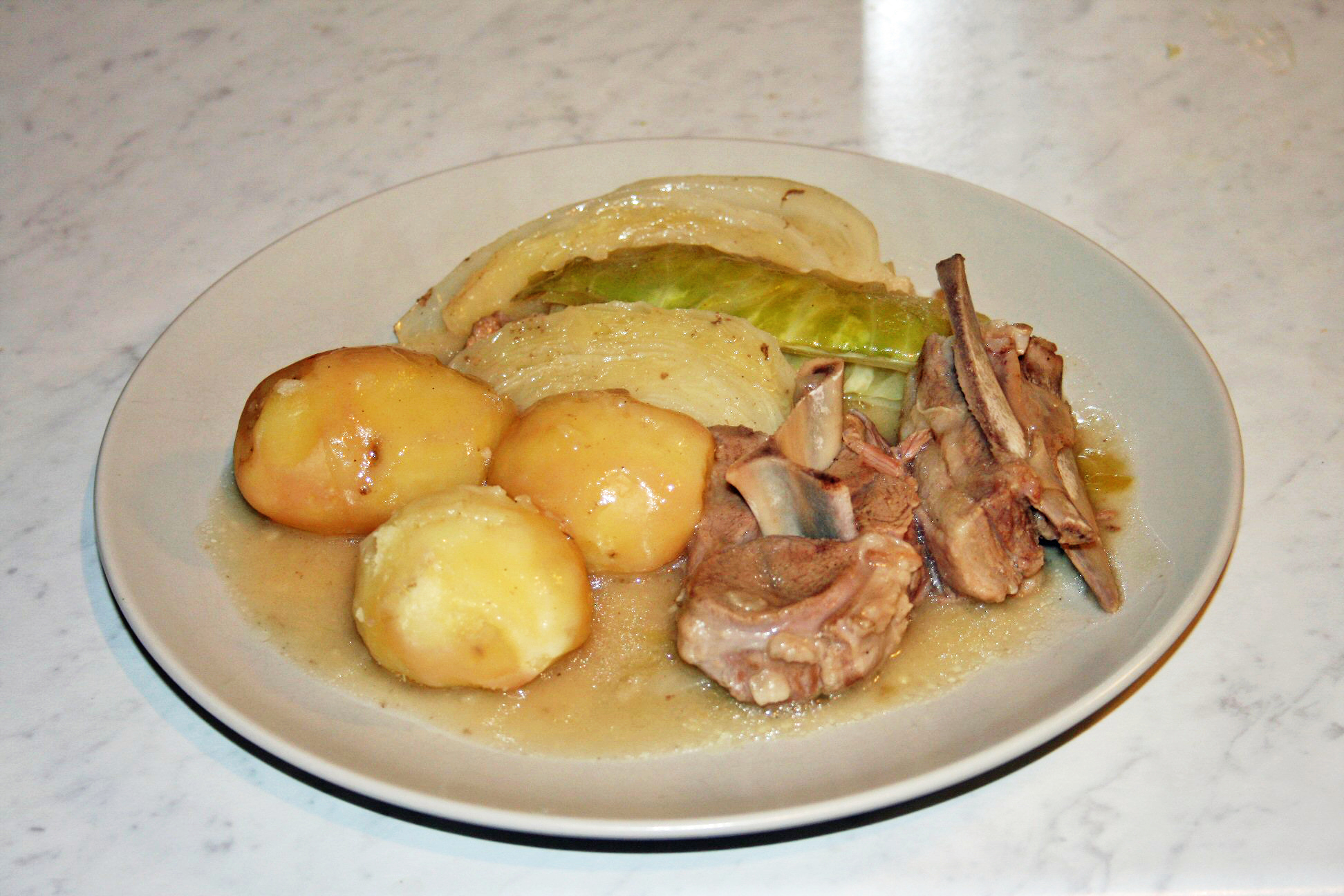
Fårikål

Preserved meat and sausages come in a variety of regional variations, and are sometimes accompanied by sour cream dishes and flatbread or wheat/potato wraps. Fenalår is a slow-cured lamb's leg. Morr is usually a smoked cured sausage, though the exact definition may vary regionally.

Lamb and mutton are popular in autumn, often used in fårikål (mutton stew with cabbage). Pinnekjøtt—steamed cured and sometimes smoked mutton ribs, traditionally on a bed of birch sticks, hence the name, meaning "stick meat" —is traditionally served as Christmas dinner in the western parts of Norway.

Other meat dishes include:

Kjøttkaker: meat patties or burgers about the size of a child's fist, made of ground beef, onion, salt, and pepper and generally served with sauce espagnole (Kjøttkakesaus or Brunsaus in Norwegian). Potatoes, stewed peas or cabbage and carrots are served on the side. Lingonberry jam is a common relish.

Kjøttboller – Meatballs: Similar to Swedish meatballs. Served with mashed potatoes and cream sauce or sauce espagnole depending on the locality.

Svinekoteletter – Pork chops: simply braised and served with potatoes and fried onions or whatever vegetables are available.

Svinestek – Roasted pork: a typical Sunday dinner, served with pickled cabbage (a sweeter variety of German sauerkraut), gravy, vegetables, and potatoes.

All good cuts of meat are roasted. Side dishes vary with season and their ability to complement the meat. Roast leg of lamb is an Easter classic, roast beef is not very common and game is often roasted for festive occasions.

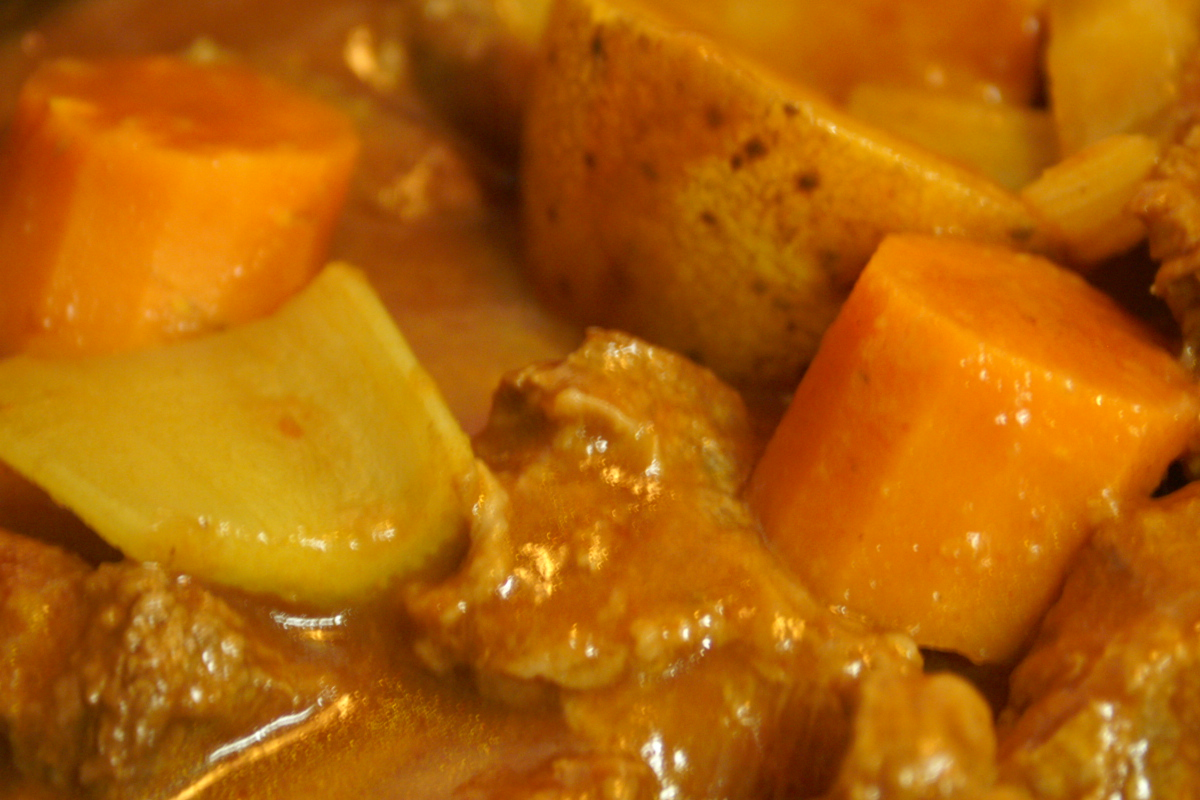
Lobscouse

Lapskaus – stew: A stew consisting of cooked meat and various vegetables like potatoes, carrots, swede and onion. Lobscouse is often served with flatbrød.

Fårikål – mutton stew: the national dish of Norway. Cabbage and mutton are layered in a pot along with black peppercorns and salt (and, in some recipes, wheat flour to thicken the sauce), covered with water and simmered until the meat is very tender. The dish is served with potatoes.

Stekte pølser – fried sausages: fresh sausages are fried and served with vegetables, potatoes, peas and perhaps some gravy.

Syltelabb is usually eaten around and before Christmas time, made from boiled, salt-cured pig's trotter. They are traditionally eaten using one's fingers, and served as a snack and sometimes served with beetroot, mustard, and fresh bread or with lefse or flatbread. Historically syltelabb is served with the traditional Norwegian juleøl (English: Christmas ale), beer and liquor (like aquavit). This is because Syltelabb is very salty food.

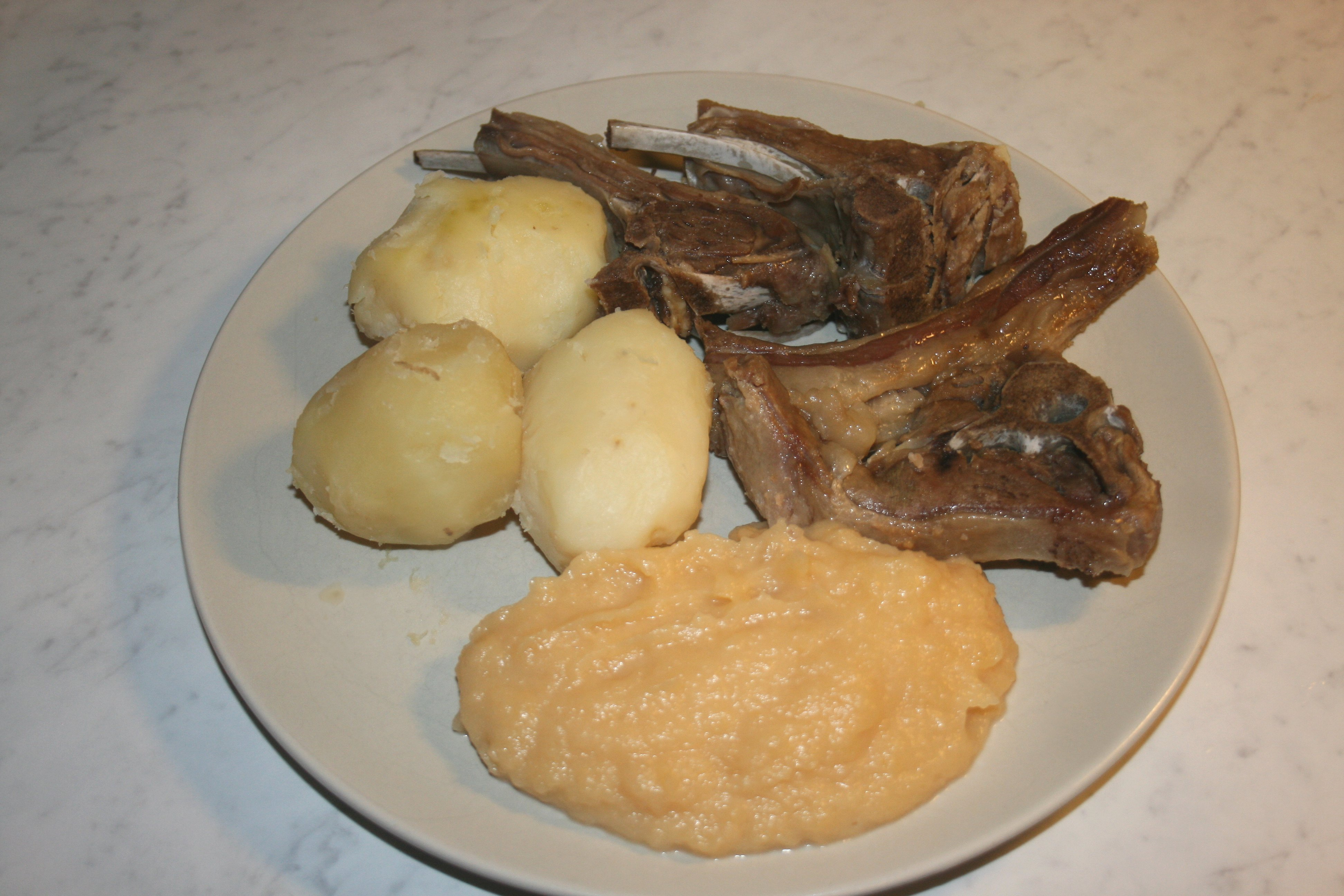
Pinnekjøtt with swede purée and potatoes

Pinnekjøtt is a main course dinner dish of lamb or mutton ribs, and this dish is largely associated with the celebration of Christmas in Western Norway and is rapidly gaining popularity in other regions as well. 31% of Norwegians say they eat pinnekjøtt for their family Christmas dinner. Pinnekjøtt is often served with puréed swede (rutabaga) and potatoes, beer and akevitt.

Smalahove is a traditional dish, but is often considered more of a local oddity, usually eaten around Christmas time and made from a sheep's head. The skin and fleece of the head are torched, the brain removed, and the head is salted, sometimes smoked, and dried. The head is boiled for about 3 hours and served with mashed swede and potatoes.

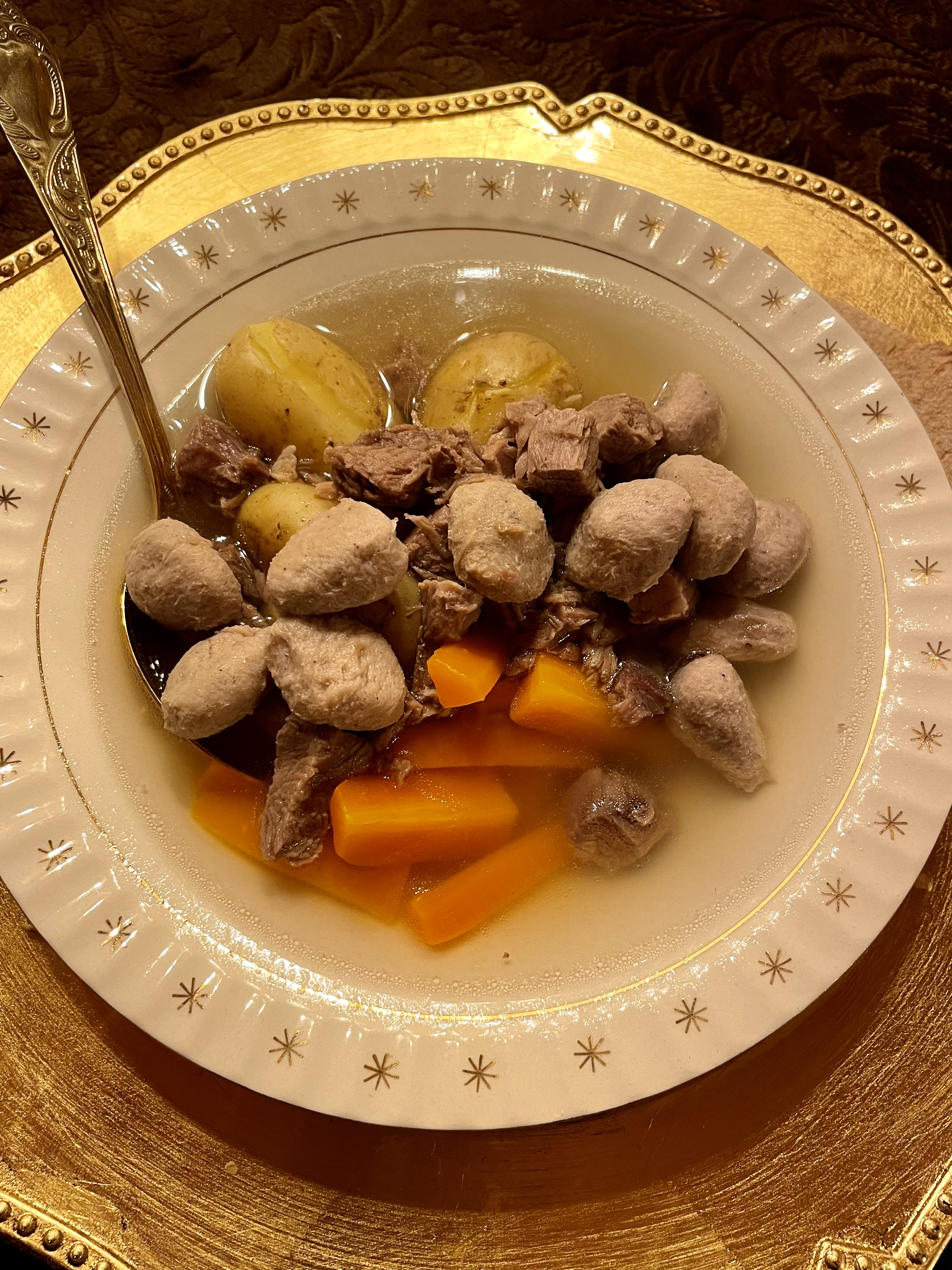
Sodd

Sodd is a traditional Norwegian soup-like meal with mutton and meatballs. Usually, vegetables such as potatoes or carrots are also included.

Gryterett (also known as gryte, literally "saucepan meal") are stews with ground beef or lamb, rice (sometimes replaced with pasta), tomato, mild spices, and small amounts of other vegetables like peppers, onion, kidney beans or mushrooms. The meal was popularised in the 1970s by Toro powderbag meals with often inaccurate geographical monikers (e.g. Mexican, American), but is now also found in homemade varieties.

=== Game ===
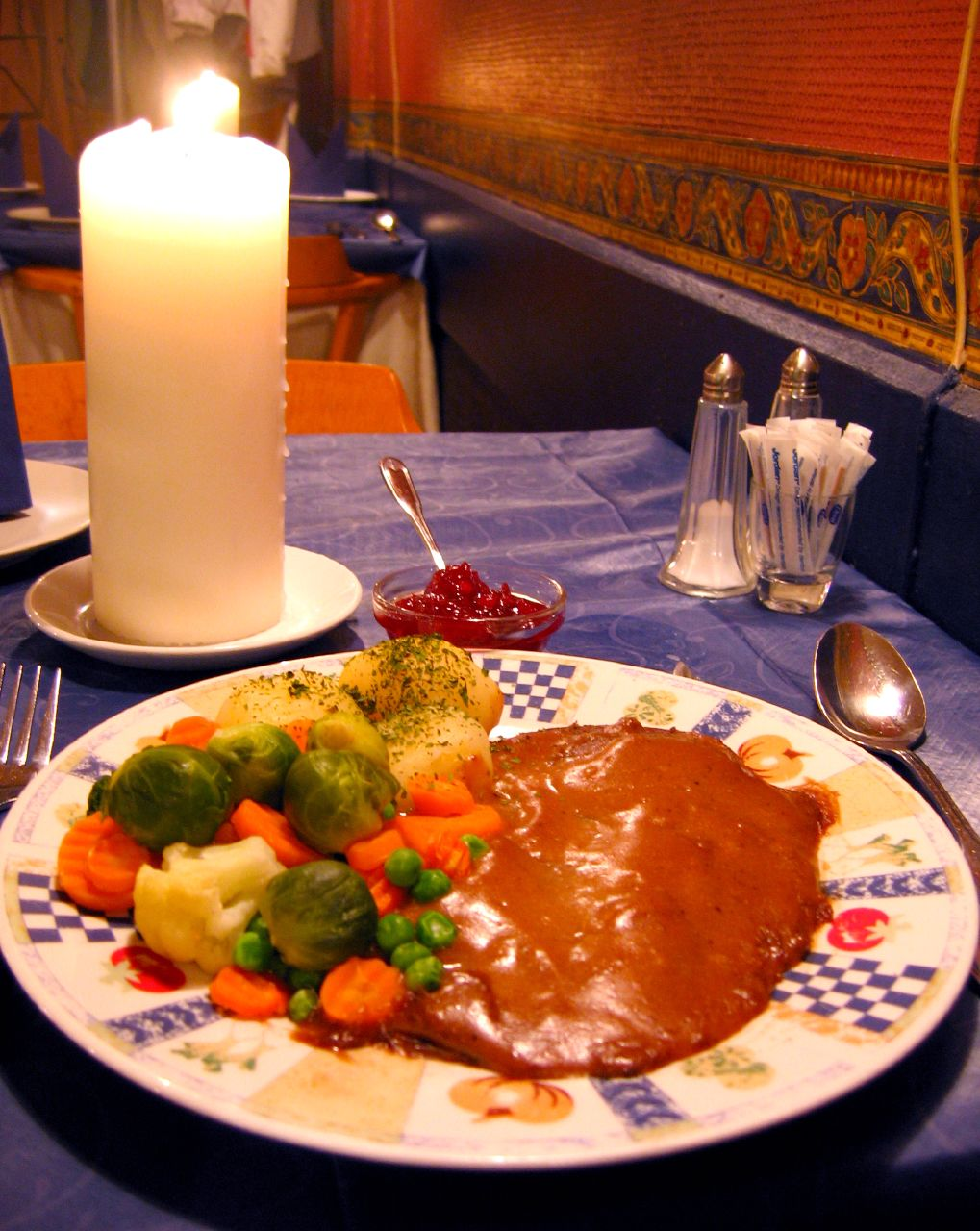
Reinsdyrsteik (reindeer roast) served with lingonberry jam

High cuisine is very reliant on game, such as moose, reindeer (strictly speaking not game, as nearly all Norwegian reindeer are semi-domesticated), mountain hare, duck, rock ptarmigan and fowl. These meats are often hunted and sold or passed around as gifts, but are also available at shops across Norway to be served at social occasions.

- Joika – Meatballs made from a mixture of meat from cow, reindeer, lamb, and pork rind, served with mashed potatoes in very thick gravy. The gravy includes brunost or goat milk. The term most commonly refers to a commercial brand with airsealed (prev. canned) packaging, with homemade varieties being uncommon.

=== Offal ===
Offal is eaten extensively, leverpostei (liver pâté) being one of the most common spreads for sandwiches, along with cold cuts such as sylte (brawn) and tunge (beef tongue).

=== Seafood ===
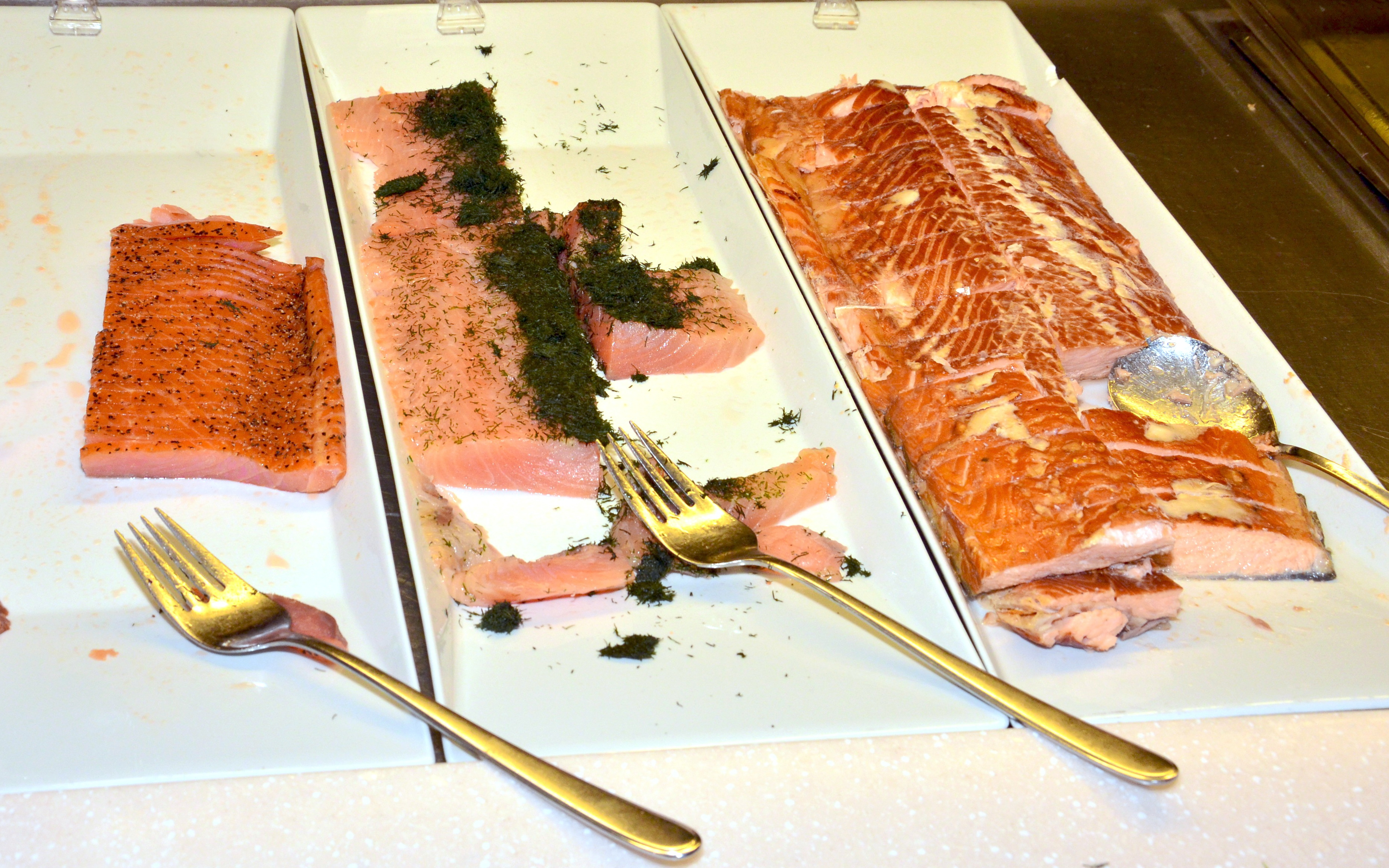
Salmon dishes: gravlax in the middle, cold-smoked on the left and warm-smoked on the right.

The one traditional Norse dish with a claim to international popularity is smoked salmon. It is now a major export, and could be considered the most important Scandinavian contribution to modern international cuisine. Smoked salmon exists traditionally in many varieties, and is often served with scrambled eggs, dill, sandwiches and mustard sauce. Another traditional salmon product is gravlaks (literally "buried salmon"). Traditionally, gravlaks would be cured for 24 hours in a mix of sugar, salt and herbs (dill). The salmon may then be frozen or kept in a chilled area. Since grav means "buried", it is a common misunderstanding that the salmon is buried in the ground (similar to how rakfisk is still prepared). This was the case in the medieval ages because the fermenting process was important; however, this is not the case today. Gravlaks is often sold under more sales-friendly names internationally. Another Norwegian fish dish is rakfisk, which consists of fermented trout, similar to Swedish surströmming.

Until the 20th century, shellfish were not eaten to any extent. This was partly due to the abundance of fish and the time involved in catching shellfish as compared to its nutritional value, as well as the fact that such food spoils rather quickly, even in a northern climate. However, prawns, crabs, and mussels have become quite popular, especially during summer. Lobster is popular, but restrictions on the catch (size and season) limit consumption. Lobster has become rather rare and expensive.

People gather for krabbefest, which translates to "crab party" feasts, either eating readily cooked crabs from a fishmonger or cooking live crabs in a large pan. This is typically done outdoors, the style being rather rustic with only bread, mayonnaise, and wedges of lemon to go with the crab. Crabs are caught in pots by both professionals and amateurs; prawns are caught by small trawlers and sold cooked at the quays. It is popular to buy half a kilogram of pie prawns and to eat it on the quay, feeding the waste to seagulls. Beer or white wine is the normal accompaniment.

The largest Norwegian food export (in fact the main Norwegian export of any kind for most of the country's history) in the past has been stockfish (tørrfisk in Norwegian). The Atlantic cod variety known as skrei because of its migrating habits, has been a source of wealth for millennia, fished annually in what is known as the Lofotfiske named for the island chain of Lofoten. Stockfish has been a staple food internationally for centuries, in particular on the Iberian peninsula and the African coast. Both during the age of sail and in the industrial age, stockfish played a part in world history as an enabling food for cross-Atlantic trade and the slave trade triangle.

A large number of fish dishes are popular today, based on such species as salmon, cod, herring, sardine, and mackerel. Seafood is used fresh, smoked, salted or pickled. Variations on creamed seafood soups are common along the coastline.

Mills Kaviar on sale in Norway, a form of fish roe-based spread

Due to seafood's availability, seafood dishes along the coast are usually based on fresh produce, typically poached (fish) and very lightly spiced with herbs, pepper, and salt. While coastal Norwegians may consider the head, roe, and liver an inseparable part of a seafood meal, most inland restaurants do not include these in the meal. In Northern Norway, a dish called mølje, consisting of poached fish, roe, and liver, is often considered a "national dish" of the region, and it is common for friends and family to get together at least once during winter for a møljekalas (loosely translated, "mølje feast"). A number of the fish species available have traditionally been avoided (especially those perceived as scavengers, due to a fear of indirectly eating friends or family members who had died at sea) or reserved for bait, but most common seafood is part of the modern menu.

Because of industrial whaling, whale meat was commonly used as a cheap substitute for beef early in the 20th century. Consumption has been declining over time, but it is still widely available in all parts of the country and most Norwegians eat it occasionally. It is not considered controversial in Norway.

Other fish dishes include:

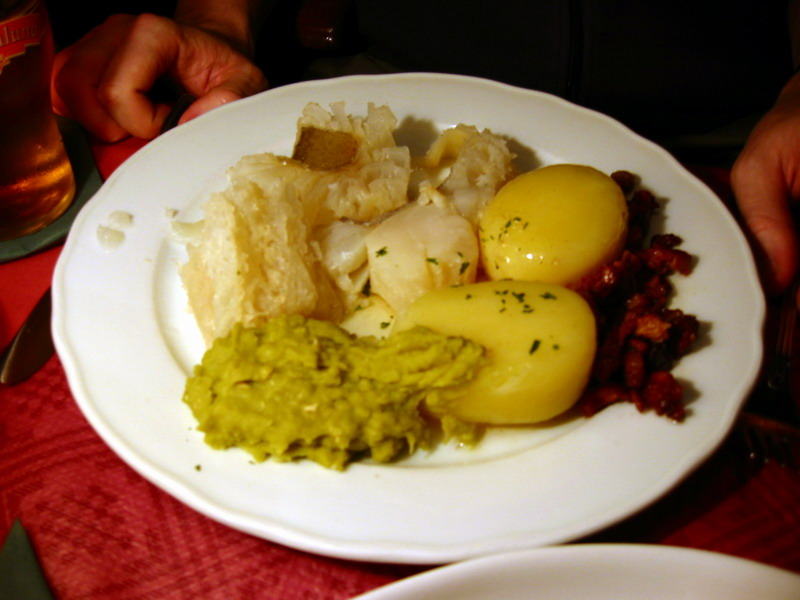
Lutefisk

Rakfisk – Norwegian fish dish made from trout or sometimes char, salted and fermented for two to three months, or even up to a year, then eaten without further cooking. Rakfisk must be prepared and stored very hygienically, due to the risk of developing Clostridium botulinum (which causes botulism) if the fish contain certain bacteria during the fermentation process.

Torsk – Cod: poached, simply served with boiled potatoes and melted butter. Carrots, fried bacon, roe and cod liver may also accompany the fish. A delicacy which is somewhat popular in Norway is torsketunger, cod's tongue.

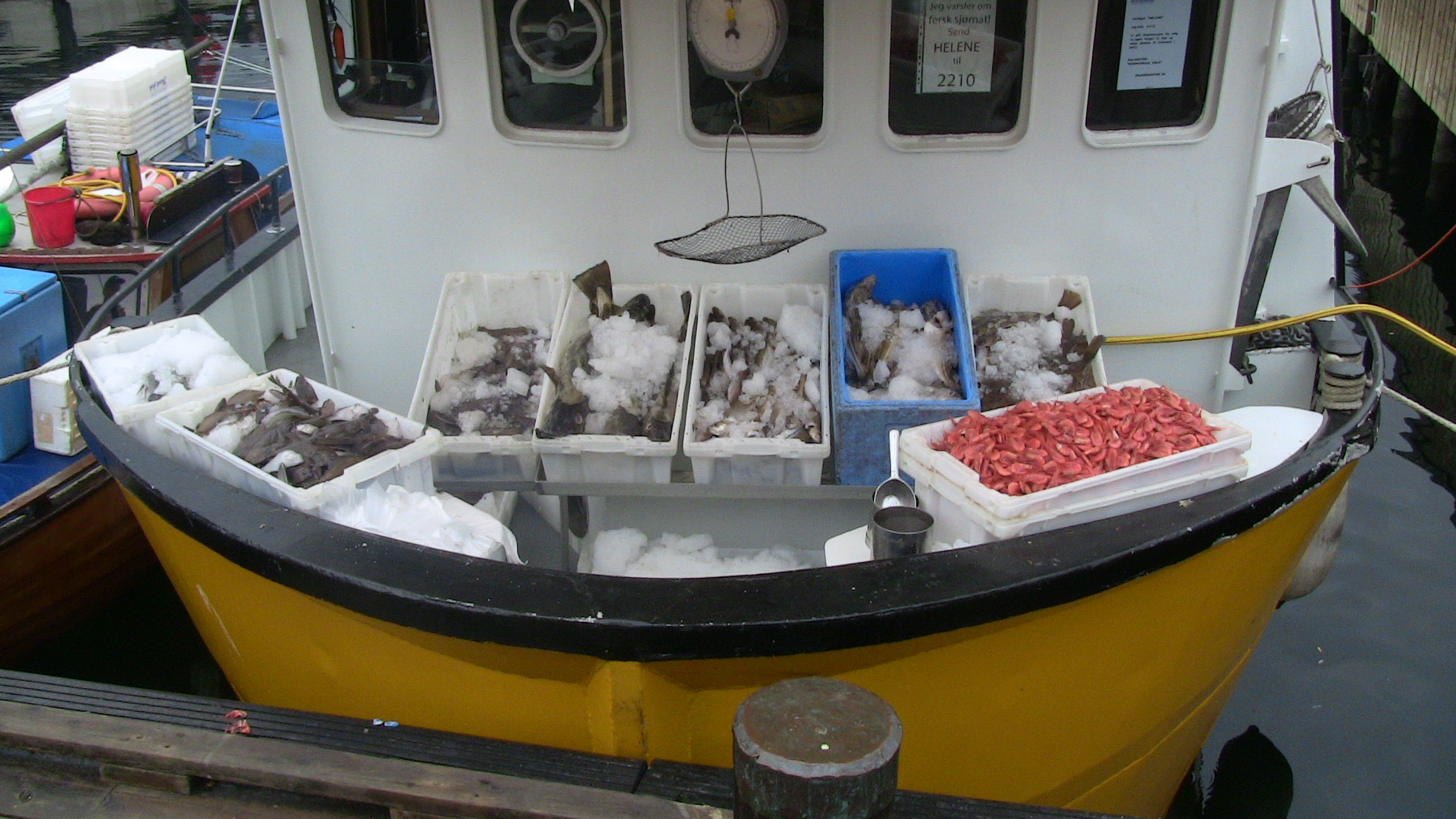
Fish Market in Oslo. Fish is an important part of Norwegian cuisine

Lutefisk – lyed fish: a modern preparation made of stockfish (dried cod or ling) or klippfisk (dried and salted cod) that has been steeped in lye. It was prepared this way as a way to preserve the fish for longer periods prior to refrigeration. It is somewhat popular in the United States as a heritage food. It retains a place in Norwegian cuisine (especially on the coast) as a traditional food around Christmas time.

Preparation and accompaniment is as for fresh cod, although beer and aquavit is served on the side.

Stekt fisk – braised fish: almost all fish are braised, but as a rule, the larger specimens tend to be poached and the smaller braised. The fish is filleted, dusted with flour, salt and pepper and braised in butter. Potatoes are served on the side, and the butter from the pan used as a sauce or food cream is added to the butter to make a creamy sauce.

Fatty fish like herring and brisling are given the same treatment. Popular accompaniments are sliced and fresh-pickled cucumbers and sour cream.

Fiskesuppe – fish soup: A white, milk-based soup with vegetables, usually carrots, onions, potato and various kinds of fish.

Spekesild – salt cured herring which for centuries was used to fight hunger, along with boiled potatoes, beets, raw onions, dill, butter and flatbrød.

Sursild – pickled herring: a variety of pickle-sauces are used, ranging from simple vinegar- sugar-based sauces with tomato, mustard, and sherry-based sauces. Pickled herring is served as an hors-d'oeuvre or on rye bread as a lunch buffet. This dish is a popular Christmas and New Year's Eve/holiday lunch in Norway.

=== Curing ===
The basic methods of curing are used: drying, salting, smoking and fermenting. Stockfish is fish (mainly cod) dried on racks, meats are dried, salt curing is common for both meats and fish. Fermenting (as in the preparation of sauerkraut) is used for trout. Smoking is mainly used on the west coast as an addition to drying and salting, perhaps due to the wet climate.

- Spekemat (lit. cured food) is Norwegian flatbread with scrambled eggs, cured ham, margarine and sour cream; usually served alongside rømmegrøt (Sourcream porridge) for dinner.

=== Sauces and marinades ===
Along with the rest of Scandinavia, Norway is one of the few places outside Asia where sweet and sour flavoring is used extensively. The sweet and sour flavor goes best with fish. There is also a treatment called "graving", literally burying, a curing method where salt and sugar are used as curing agents. Although salmon or trout are the most common, other fish and meat also get a treatment similar to gravlaks.

Sandefjordsmør – a traditional butter and cream sauce typically served with fish dishes such as salmon, garnished with fresh dill and peppercorn. This sauce was reputedly first concocted in Sandefjord, a coastal city in Vestfold, in 1959.

Gravlaks – sweet and salty cured salmon: a filleted side of salmon or trout that has been frozen for at least 24 hours to kill off parasites, is cured with the fillet and is covered with a half-salt, half-sugar mixture, spiced with black pepper, dill and akevitt, covered with clingfilm, and cured in the refrigerator for three days, turned once a day.

Gravet elg – sweet and salt-cured moose: this treatment may be used for all red meat, but works best with game and beef. It is the same procedure as for gravlaks, but aquavit is often substituted for brandy, and juniper berries for dill.

Pickled herring: a pickle is made with vinegar, sugar, herbs and spices like dill, mustard seed, black peppercorns, onion. The pickle must be acidic enough to prevent bacterial growth. Rinsed, salt-cured herring is added and allowed to stand for at least 24 hours.

== Fruit and desserts ==
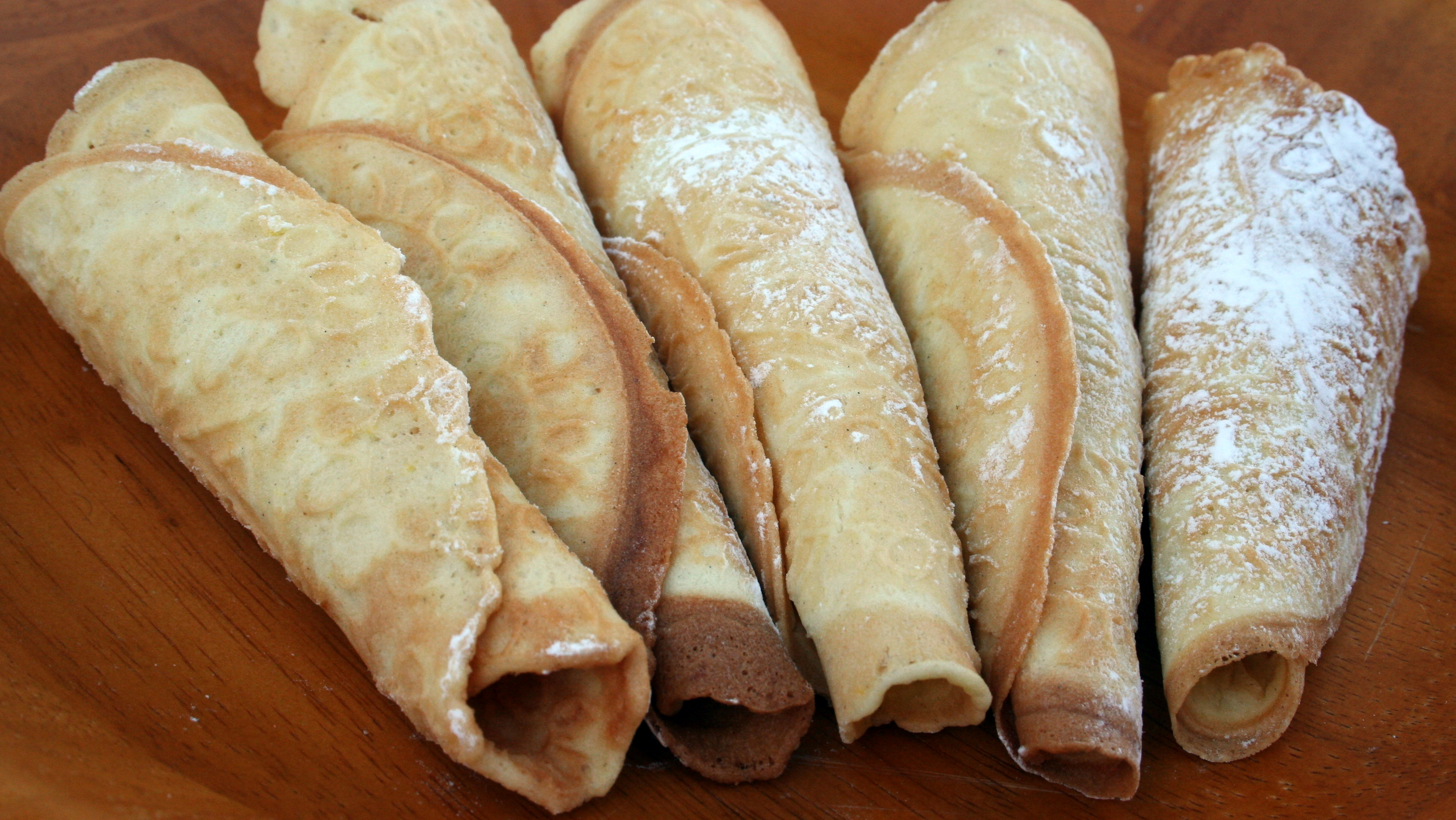
Krumkaker is a traditional pastry

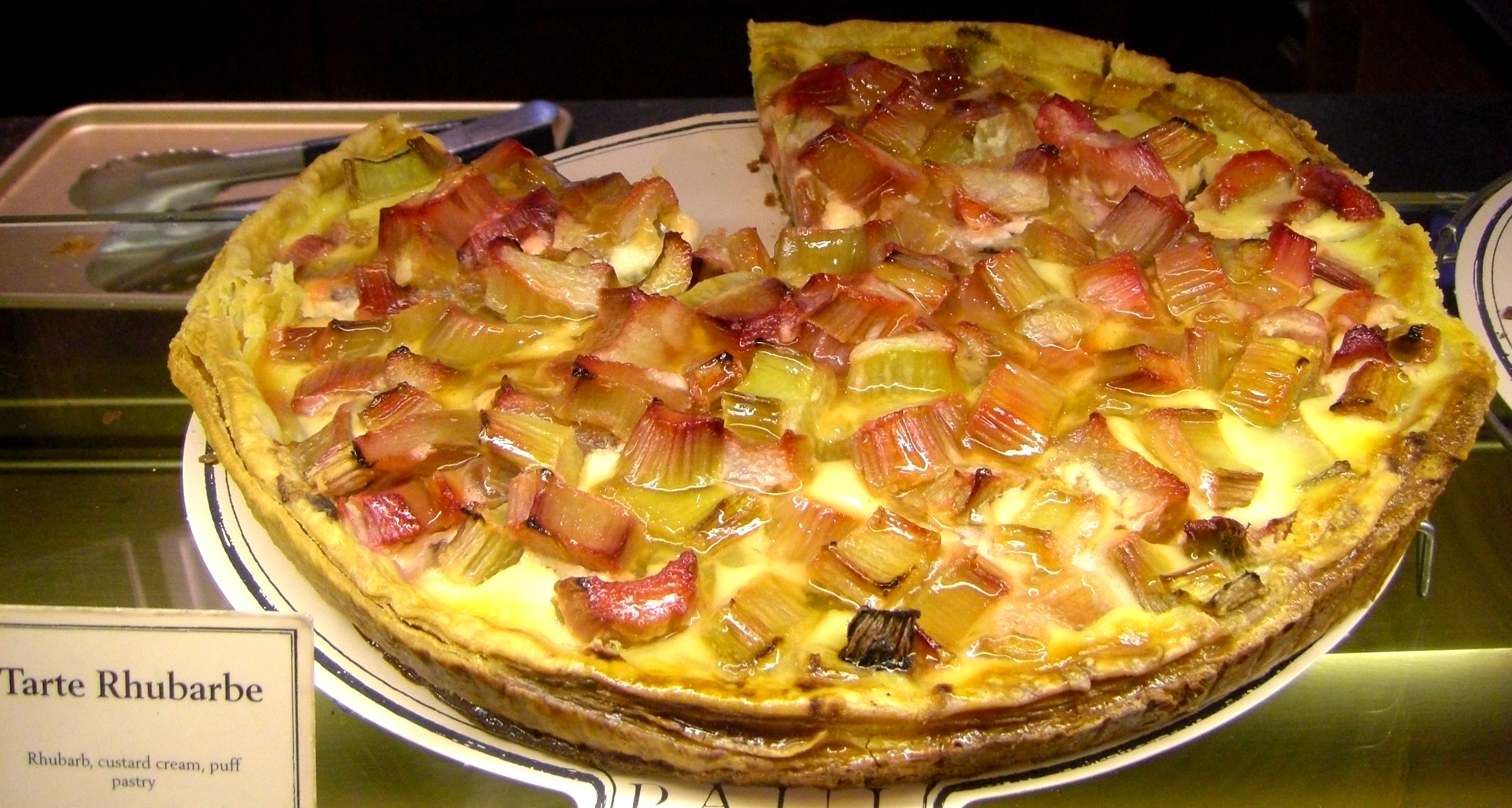
Rhubarb tart

Fruits and berries mature slowly in the cold climate. As a result, they are smaller with a more intense taste. Strawberries, bilberries, lingonberries, raspberries and apples are popular and are part of a variety of desserts, as are cherries in the parts of the country where they are grown. Wild cloudberry is regarded as a delicacy. A typical Norwegian dessert on special occasions is cloudberries with whipped or plain cream. Strawberry-apple pie is also popular because of its rich flavour. Rhubarb pie (rabarbrapai in Norwegian) is another favoured dish in Norway.

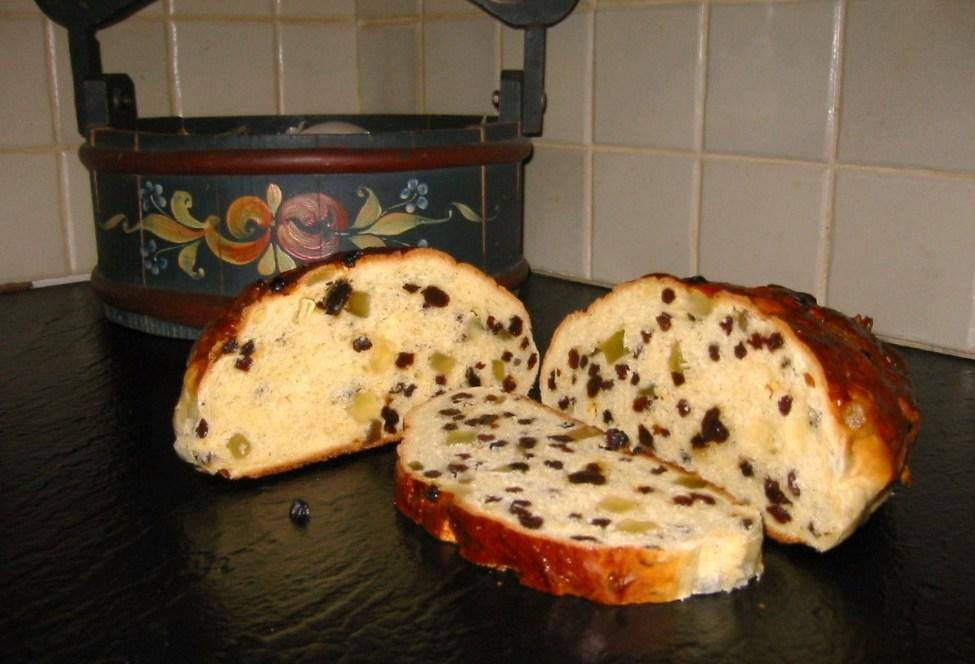
Julekake served during Christmas time.

German and Nordic-style cakes and pastries, such as sponge cakes and Danish pastry (known as wienerbrød, literal translation: "Viennese bread") share the table with a variety of homemade cakes, waffles and biscuits. Cardamom is a common flavoring. Another Norwegian cake is Krumkake, a paper-thin rolled cake filled with whipped cream. (Krumkake means 'Curved Cake' or 'Crooked Cake'). Baked meringues are known as pikekyss, literally translated as "girl's kiss".

During Christmas (jul), the traditional Norwegian holiday season, many different dessert dishes are served including Julekake, a heavily spiced leavened loaf often coated with sugar and cinnamon, and Multekrem (whipped cream with cloudberries).

== Breads ==
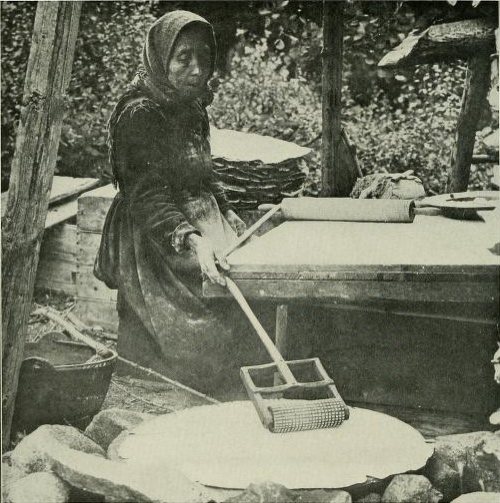
A Norwegian peasant making flatbread in the 1910s.

Bread is an important staple of the Norwegian diet and bakeries and supermarkets. Accommodations such as hotels in Norway offer a rich selection of breads. Breads containing a large proportion of whole grain flour (grovbrød, or "coarse bread") are popular, likely because bread makes up such a substantial part of the Norwegian diet and are therefore expected to be nutritious. 80% of Norwegians regularly eat bread, in the form of open-top sandwiches with butter for breakfast and lunch. A soft flat bread called lefse made out of potato, milk or cream (or sometimes lard) and flour is also very popular.

The variety of bread available in a common supermarket is rather large: wittenberger (crisp-crusted wheat bread), grovbrød (whole-wheat bread, often with syrup), loff (soft wheat bread), sourdough bread, Polarbrød and other German-style breads. Baguettes, ciabatta, bagels and so on are also popular. During the Hanseatic era, cereals were imported in exchange for fish by the Hanseatic League. Both the German Hanseatic League and the Danish colonizers influenced Norwegian cuisine, bringing continental habits, taste and produce. Norwegians are particularly fond of a crisp crust, regarding a soft crust as a sign of the bread being stale. Oats are used in addition to wheat and rye and constitute perhaps the most unusual cereal employed in bread-making, as compared to continental Europe and the UK. Nuts and seeds (such as sunflower seeds and walnuts) are rather common ingredients, along with olives and sun-dried pickles, used to improve the texture of the bread.

== Cheese ==
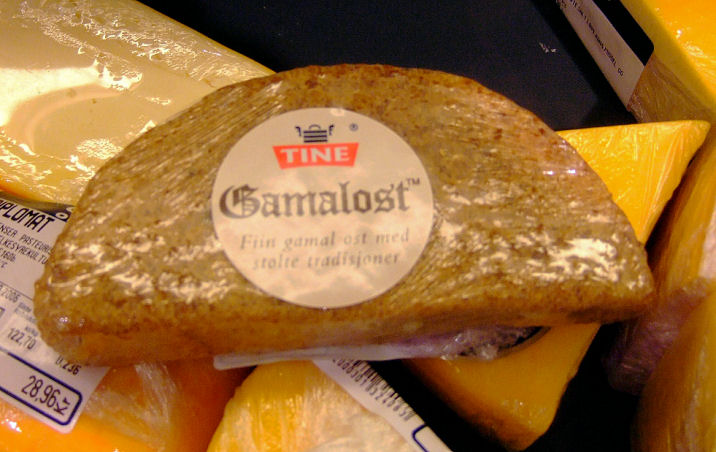
Gamalost with some of the granular texture visible

Cheese is still extremely popular in Norway, though the variety of traditional products available and commonly in use is severely reduced. Norvegia is a common yellow cheese (produced since the 1890s) as is Jarlsberg cheese which is also known as a Norwegian export (produced since the 1850s). The sweet brunost (lit. brown cheese; not a true cheese, but rather caramelized lactose from goat milk or a mix of goat and/or cow milk) is very popular in cooking and with bread. More sophisticated, traditional, or strong cheeses include gammalost (lit. "old cheese"), an over-matured, highly pungent cheese made from sour milk; pultost, made from sour milk and caraway seeds; and nøkkelost, flavored with cumin and cloves.

== Beverages ==
=== Coffee ===
Norway has a particularly strong affinity for coffee, with the average Norwegian drinking 142 L (31 imp gal; 38 US gal), or 9.5 kg (21 lb) of coffee in 2011. In 2018, Norway had the fourth highest per capita coffee consumption in the world, and it plays a large role in Norwegian culture. It is common to invite people over for coffee and cakes and to drink coffee with dessert after the main courses in get-togethers. Coffee is traditionally served black, usually in a mug, rather than a cup. As in the rest of the West, Italian-style coffee bars have become popular. Coffee is included in one of the most traditional alcoholic beverages in Norway, commonly known as karsk, from Trøndelag.

=== Alcohol ===
Both industrial and small-scale brewing have long traditions in Norway. In recent years, microbreweries and craft beer have become increasingly popular. Despite restrictive alcohol policies, there is a large community of brewers, and a colorful variety of beverages, some legal, some less so. The most popular industrial beers are usually pilsners and red beers (bayer), while traditional beer is much richer, with a high alcohol and malt content. The ancient practice of brewing Juleøl (Christmas beer) persists even today, and imitations of these are available before Christmas, in shops and, for the more potent versions, at state monopoly outlets. Many Norwegians brew their own beer, and there are also a large number of breweries and microbreweries. Cider brewing has faced tough barriers to commercial production due to alcohol regulations. The famous honey wine, mjød (mead), is mostly a drink for connoisseurs, Norse and medieval historical re-enactors, and practitioners of åsatru and other Norse neopagan religions. The climate has not been hospitable to grapes for millennia, and wines and more potent drinks are available only from the wine monopolies.

Distilled beverages include akevitt, a yellow-tinged liquor spiced with caraway seeds, also known as akvavit or other variations on the Latin aqua vitae – water of life. The Norwegian linie style is distinctive for its maturing process, crossing the equator in sherry casks stored in the hull of a ship, giving it more taste and character than the rawer styles of other Scandinavian akevittar. Norway also produces some vodkas, bottled water and fruit juices.

In rural Norway, it is still common to find hjemmebrent (moonshine, literally "home burnt"). Even for personal consumption, it is illegal by Norwegian law to produce distilled alcohol. If the product has more than 60% alcohol by volume, it is defined as a narcotic by the law and the punishments are even harsher than for other drugs. The traditional home distiller is mostly left alone by the law enforcers, but those who produce on a larger scale and sell the product are not.

In Norway, beer is available in stores from 09:00 to 20:00 on weekdays and from 09:00 to 18:00 on Saturdays. Wine and spirits can be bought until 18:00 on weekdays and until 16:00 on Saturdays in government-owned and run liquor shops (Vinmonopolet). Only "true" grocery stores are allowed to sell beer; gas stations and so-called "Fruit & Tobacco" marts (Frukt og Tobakk or kiosk in Norwegian) are not.

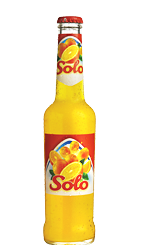
Solo soda water in a glass bottle

=== Soda water ===
The largest local soda brand is Solo, which was the first soda brand in Norway, introduced in 1934. Other well-known sodas from Norway include Urge, E. C. Dahls Brewery's ginger beer, which was created as a drink for sodd, and sodas from Oskar Sylte Mineral Water Company, such as «Brus med ananassmak» (soda with pineapple taste) and «Brus med pæresmak» (soda with pear taste). During Christmas season, it is normal to find Julebrus (Norwegian for "Christmas soda").

== People ==
Ingrid Espelid Hovig was a high-profile public figure within Norwegian cuisine, hosting TV cooking programs and authoring dozens of cookbooks. She was knighted in Norway for her work with cuisine.

== See also ==
- The Flying Culinary Circus, team of four chefs from Norway
- List of Norwegian dishes
