= Pultost =

Norwegian sour milk cheese flavored with caraway seeds

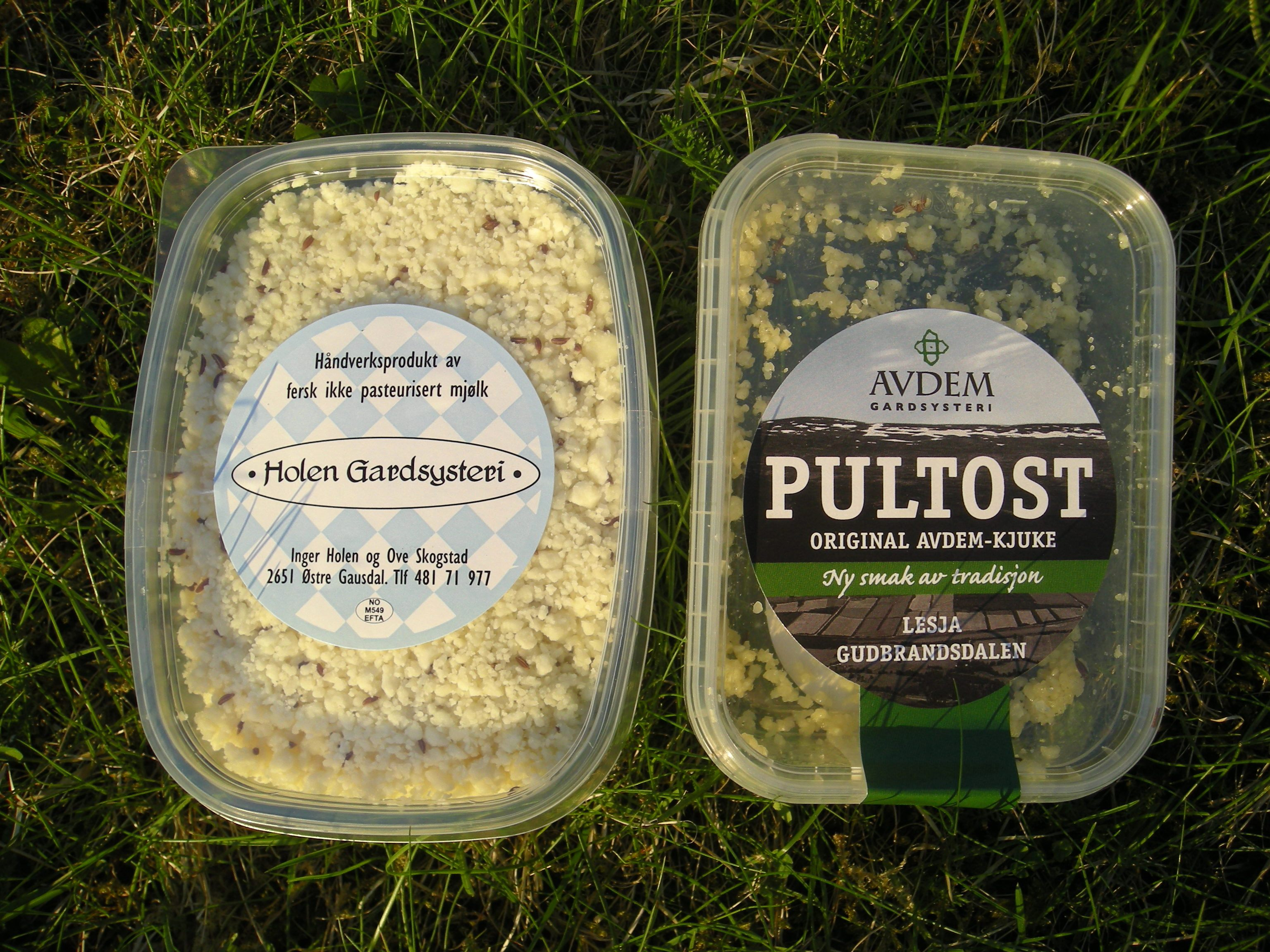
Pultost

Pultost is a soft, mature Norwegian sour milk cheese flavored with caraway seeds.

Like gamalost, pultost has a long history in Norway. The cheese is made from skimmed milk that has been soured, similar to cultured buttermilk, flavoured with caraway and preserved with salt. Pultost is an acid-set cheese, and very low in fat. Pultost is found in two variants, spreadable and grainy. The spreadable variant has a stronger taste. Pultost is commonly either spread on bread, lefse or flatbread or served with boiled potatoes.

Norwegian dairy products company Tine produces pultost at its dairy at Nybergsund in Trysil Municipality. Tine make three qualities: a spreadable, soft type called Løiten; a looser type with a dry and grainy texture called Hedemark; and another grainy type with stronger flavour called Lillehammer. Synnøve Finden is another manufacturer of pultost in Norway. The cheese mass is produced by Tine and processed further by Synnøve Finden. Synnøve Finden is promoting two types of pultost: Seterost and Hedmark.

== See also ==
- List of cheeses
