= Rakfisk =

Norwegian fermented fish dish made from trout or char

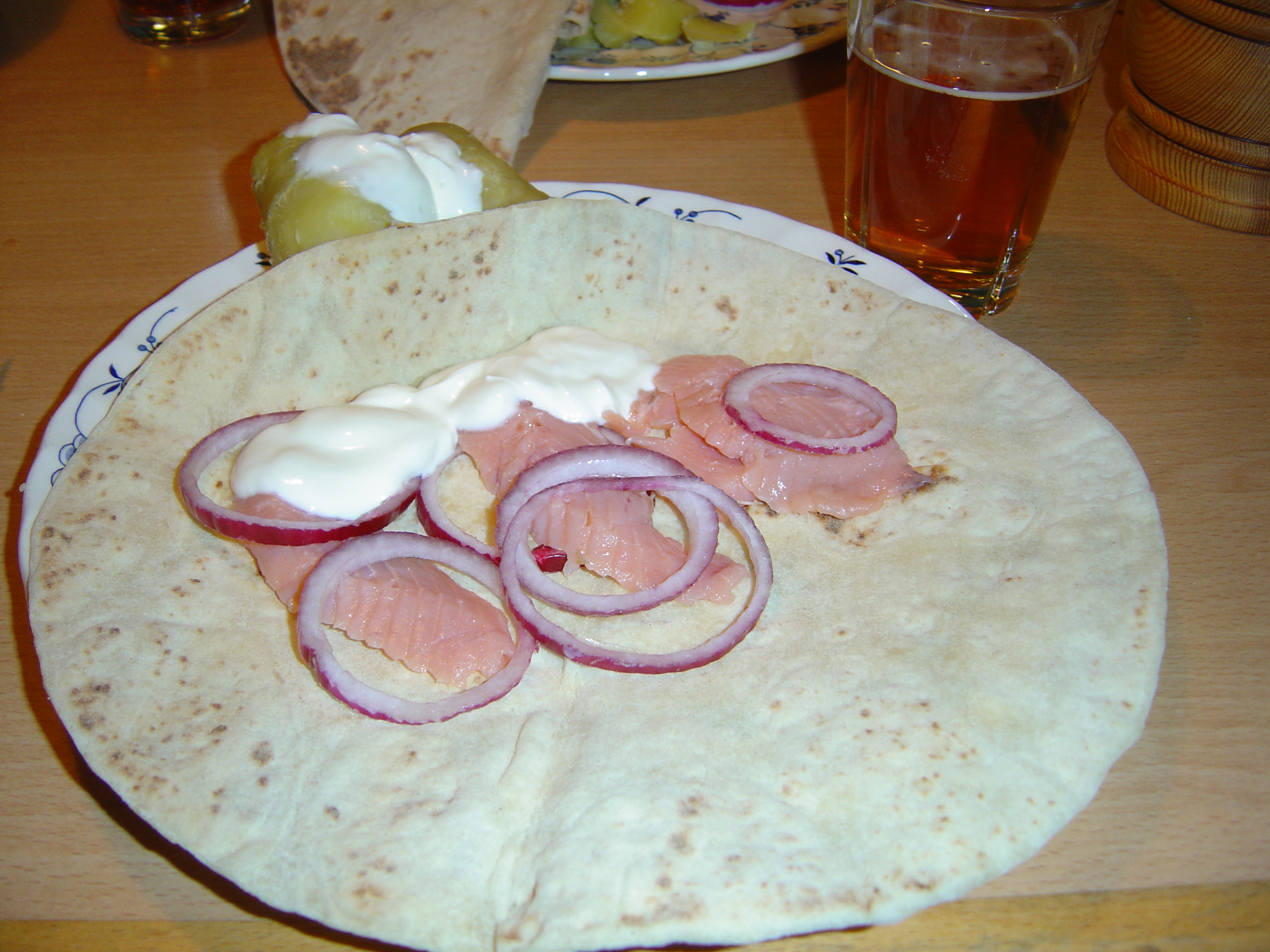
Rakfisk served on lefse with onions and sour cream.

Rakfisk ([ˈrɑ̂ːkfɪsk]) is a Norwegian fish dish made from trout or char, salted and autolysed for two to three months, or even up to a year. Rakfisk is then eaten without cooking and has a strong smell and a pungent salty flavour.

== Origin ==
The first record of the term rakfisk dates back to 1348, but the history of this food is probably even older. No sources are available as to the exact invention year of the rakfisk dish or the autolysis process that produces the raw material for it.

== General ==
=== Etymology ===
Fisk is the Norwegian word for "fish." Rak derives from the word rakr in Norse language, meaning "moist" or "soaked".

=== Preparation method ===
Rakfisk is made from fresh trout or char. After gutting and rinsing, the fish is placed in a bucket and salted. Small amounts of sugar may be added to speed up the autolysation process. The fish is then placed under pressure with a lid that fits down into the bucket and a weight on top. A brine is formed as the salt draws moisture from the fish. The rakfisk bucket is stored at under 5 degrees Celsius (41 degrees Fahrenheit) for one to three months.

=== Eating ===
The finished product does not need cooking and is eaten as it is. Traditionally, rakfisk is served sliced or as a fillet on flatbrød or lefse, with almond potatoes. Some also include thinly sliced raw red onion, sour cream, and mustard-sauce (a mild form of mustard with dill).

== See also ==
- Surströmming
- Hákarl
- Lutefisk
- Gravlax
- Fermented fish
- Acquired taste
