= Bløtkake =

Norwegian layer cake

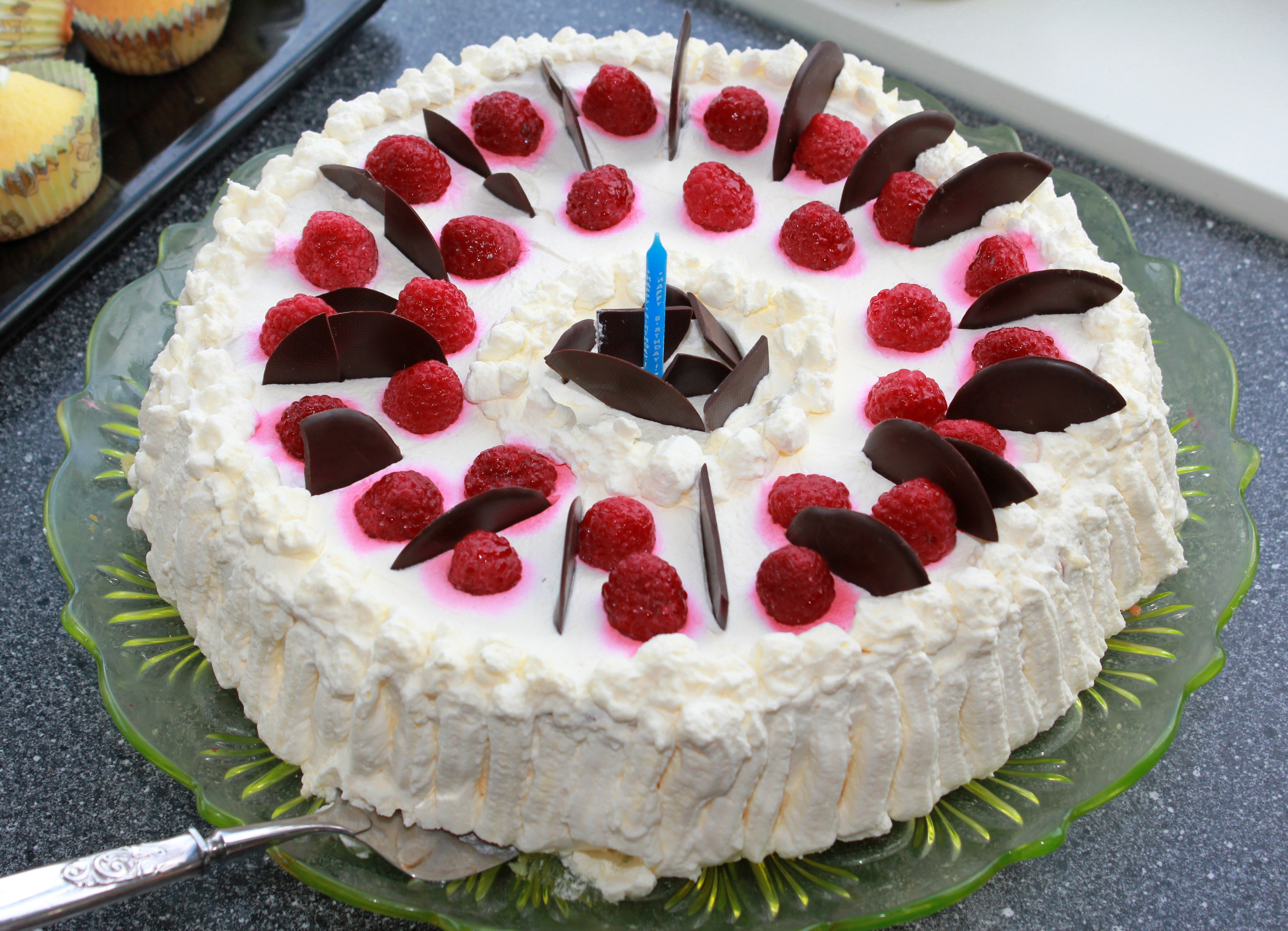
- Bløtkake topped with berries and chocolate
- Type: Cake
- Place of origin: Norway
- Region or state: Northern Europe
- Main ingredients: Cream, custard, and fruit

Bløtkake is a type of layer cake from Norway. It consists of layers of sukkerbrød, which bears resemblance to pound cake but is usually lighter, whipped cream or custard, and fresh or preserved fruit or berries. It is typically served to mark occasions such as birthdays, jubilees, or Constitution Day in Norway. In the summer months fresh berries are often included. The cake is topped with whipped cream and some sort of garnish, which often indicates which ingredients have been used between the layers in addition to the whipped cream or custard. Icing is not used in a traditional Norwegian bløtkake. For birthdays it is customary to decorate the cake also with candles, especially when celebrating a child or teenager.

The same cake is known in Sweden as gräddtårta, in Denmark as lagkage and in Finland as täytekakku.

== History ==
The earliest known recipe for bløtkake is in a cookbook written by Helle Schrøders in Denmark in 1692. In countries outside of Norway, it is commonly referred to as torte or whipped cream cake.

== Gallery ==
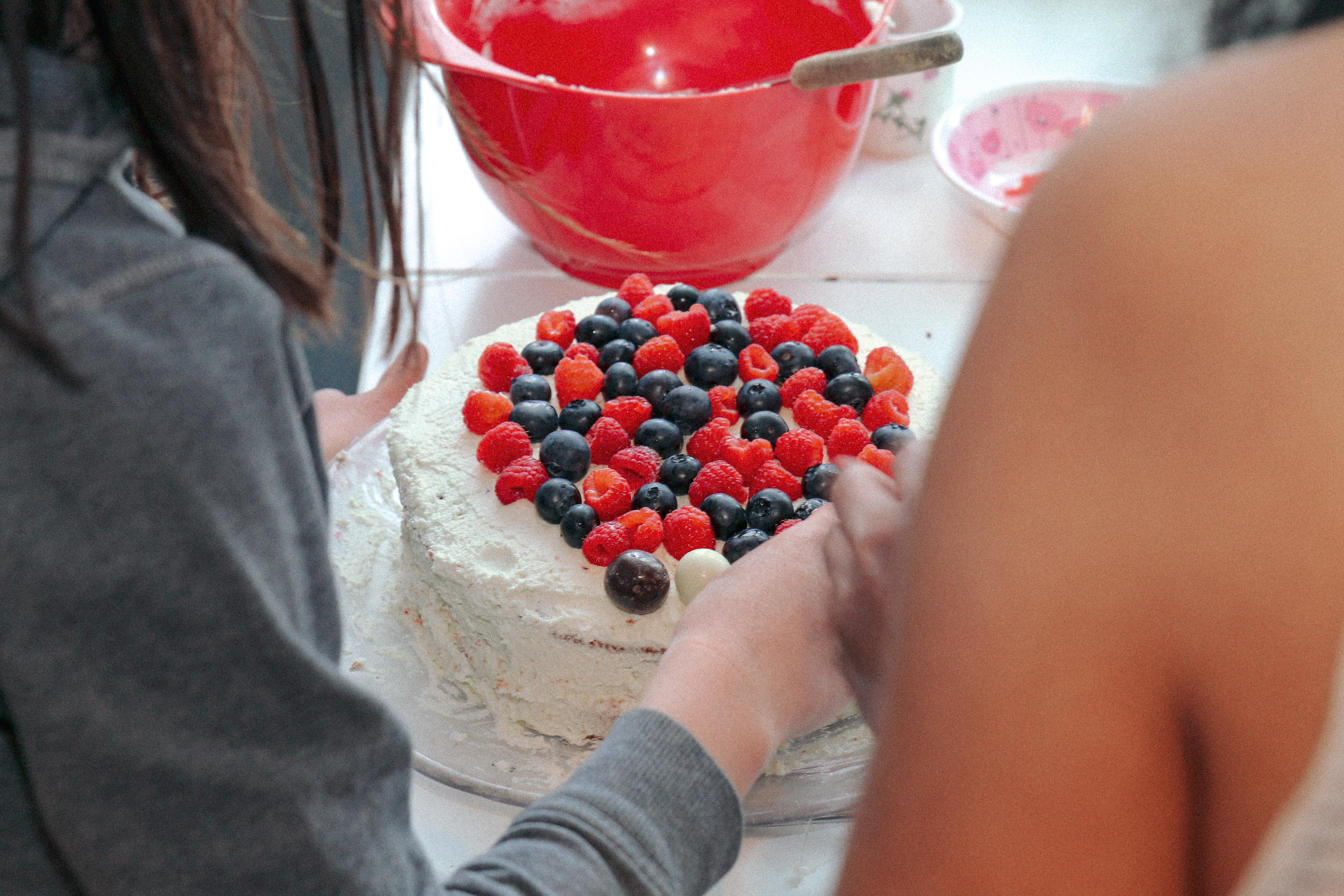
Bløtkake being served

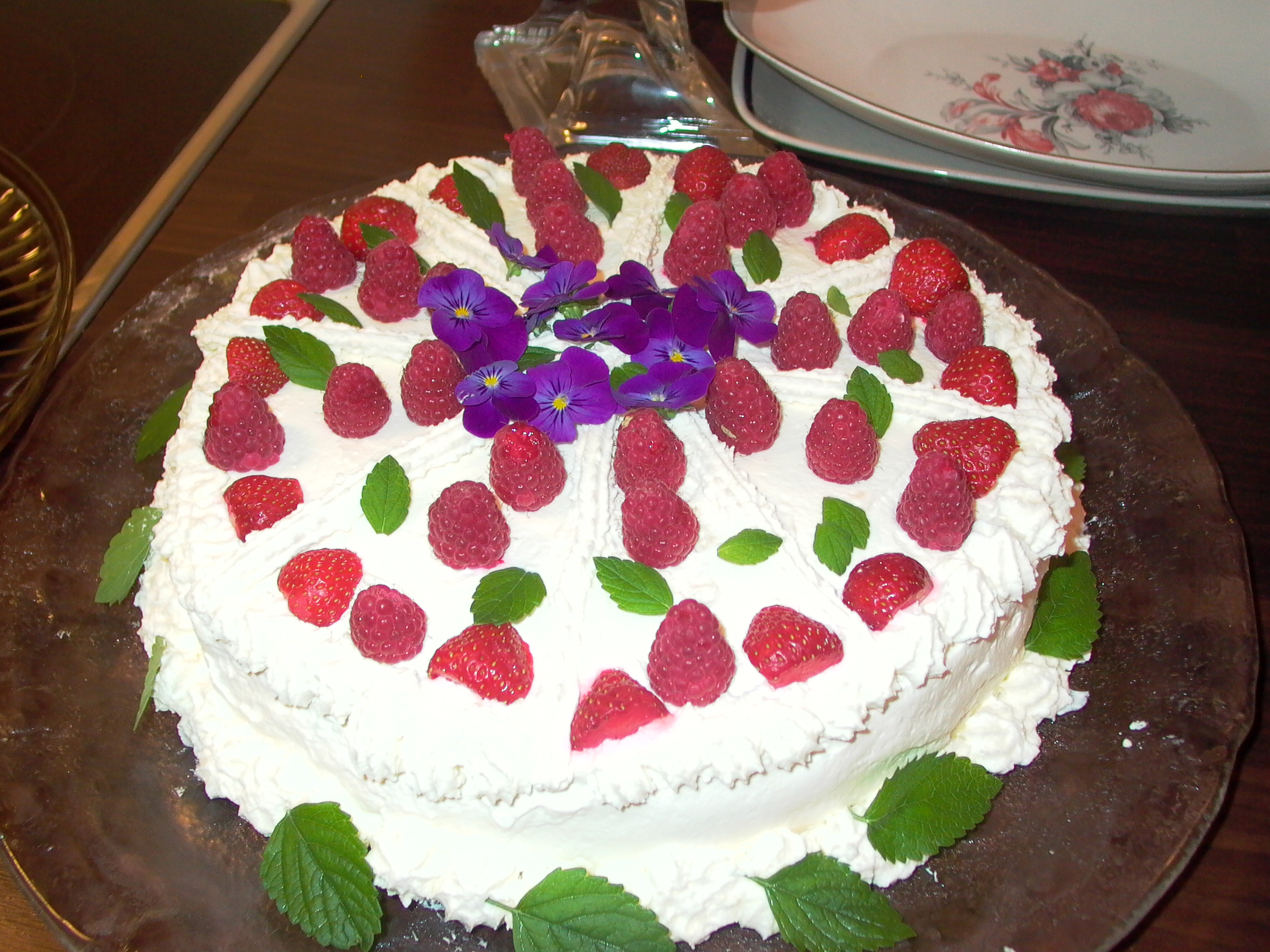
With mint and strawberries
