= Skyr =

Icelandic cultured dairy product

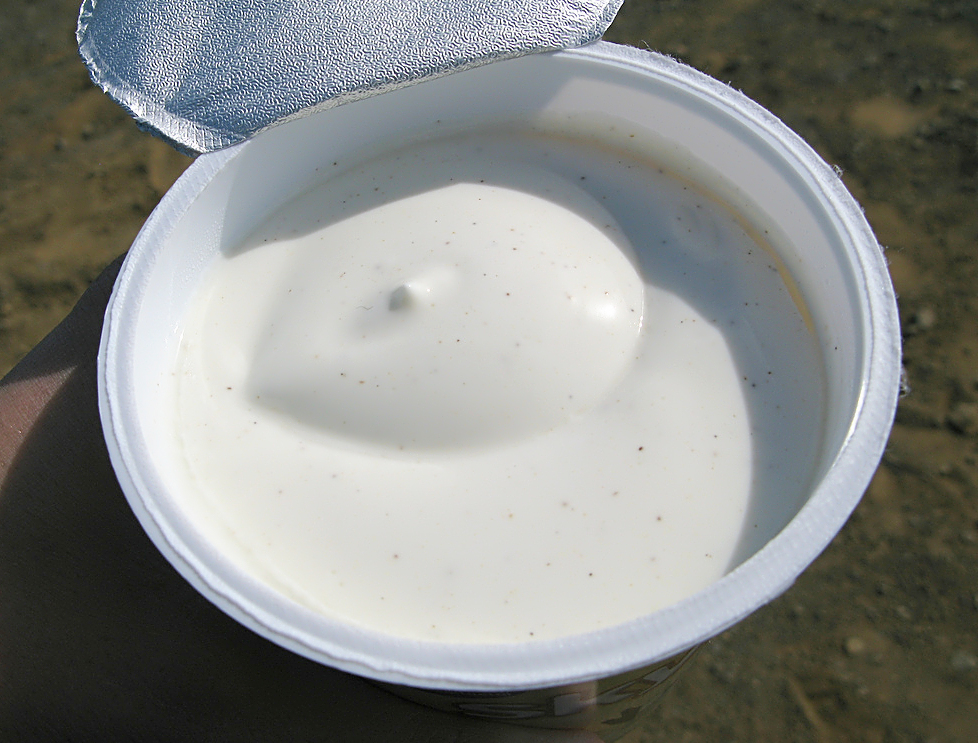
Mass-produced vanilla skyr

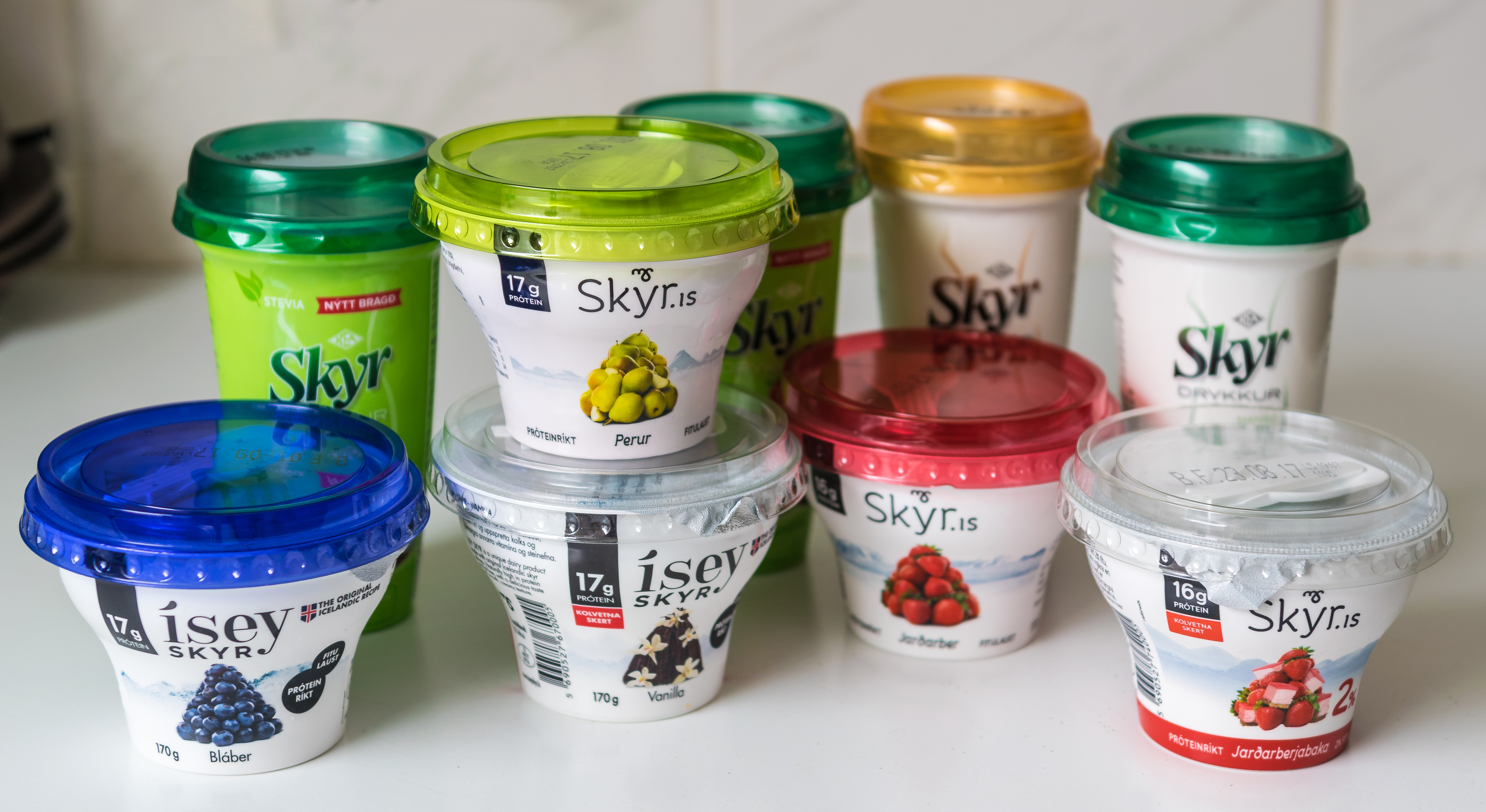
Varieties of flavored skyr

Skyr (/ˈskɪər/ SKEER; Icelandic pronunciation: [ˈscɪːr̥]) is a traditional Icelandic cultured dairy product. It has the consistency of strained yogurt, but a milder flavor. Skyr can be classified as a fresh sour milk cheese, similar to curd cheese, consumed like a yogurt in the Baltic states, the Low Countries and Germany. It has been a part of Icelandic cuisine for centuries.

Skyr has a slightly sour dairy flavor, with a hint of residual sweetness. It is traditionally served cold, sometimes with cream. Commercial manufacturers of skyr may add flavors such as vanilla, coffee, or fruit.

== Etymology ==
The word skyr is related to the English word shear (to cut), referring to how the milk is split into the liquid whey and the thick skyr. Skyr or skjør can also mean "animal sperm" in Norwegian.

== History ==
Skyr is mentioned in several medieval Icelandic sources, including Egil's saga and Grettis saga. However, it is not known how similar this was to modern skyr because no detailed description of medieval skyr has survived. Originally, skyr was made from sheep's milk, but today the world is more familiar with cow's milk skyr.

In Scandinavia, versions of the word skyr have been used for various cultured milk products since the middle ages and continue today. These are usually made without cooking, by adding culture to skimmed milk and leaving it to ferment. Rennet is not usually used. This skyr (skjør in standard Norwegian) might be eaten with bread, watered down and drunk, cooked in porridge, or mixed with sour cream as a dip for flatbread, or cooked to split into curds such as in skjørost, gamalost or skjør-kjuke for eating and sour whey for drinking.

A food more similar to the Icelandic skyr is found in Østerdalen, Norway. Kjellermjølk is made by heating skimmed milk, cooling it, then adding the culture (and often rennet) gradually. The resulting split liquid can be consumed for months.

== Nutrition ==
Skyr is a high-protein, low-fat product made from low-fat milk, varying slightly between brands. Unflavored skyr has roughly 13 g protein, 4 g carbohydrates, and 0.2 g fat per 100 g. This is approximately 16 g of protein per 100 kcal, compared to skimmed milk at 10 g of protein per 100 kcal. This is due to the high retention of whey in the finished product.

== Production ==
Today, skyr is made from skimmed milk which is either pasteurized or heated to at least 72–75 °C (162–167 °F) for 15–20 seconds, and then cooled down to 37 °C (99 °F). A small portion of a previous batch of skyr is then added to the warm milk to introduce the essential culture (the active bacterial culture), and with the addition of rennet the milk starts to curdle. It is left to ferment for 5 hours before being cooled to 18 °C (64 °F). Then the product is strained through fabric to remove the liquid whey.

Bacteria such as Streptococcus thermophilus and Lactobacillus delbrueckii subsp. bulgaricus play an important role in the fermentation of skyr. They also play a major role in the production of yogurt, but the yeast which is active in the low temperature step ensures that the product becomes a skyr and not a yogurt.

== Commerce ==
Skyr is commonly consumed in Iceland. Efforts at marketing it outside of Iceland began in 2005 when it was exported to the U.S. and sold at the natural-foods market Whole Foods Market. Licensed production began the next year in Denmark and Scotland. Mjólkursamsalan (the major dairy cooperative in Iceland) and its associates registered "skyr" as a trademark in some countries, but this was later ruled to be invalid, as "skyr" was found to be a generic term like "milk".

The commercial distribution of skyr outside of Iceland increased in the 2010s, with marketing as a low-sugar, no-fat, high-protein product consumed as a snack. In 2012, 80% of exported Icelandic skyr went to Finland and 20% to the U.S. Numerous skyr parlors were opened in Finland in 2019.

Skyr is also made in other countries.

== See also ==
- Filmjölk – another Nordic cultured milk product
- Viili – a cultured milk product from Finland
- List of fermented milk products
