= Skjenning =

Norwegian flatbread

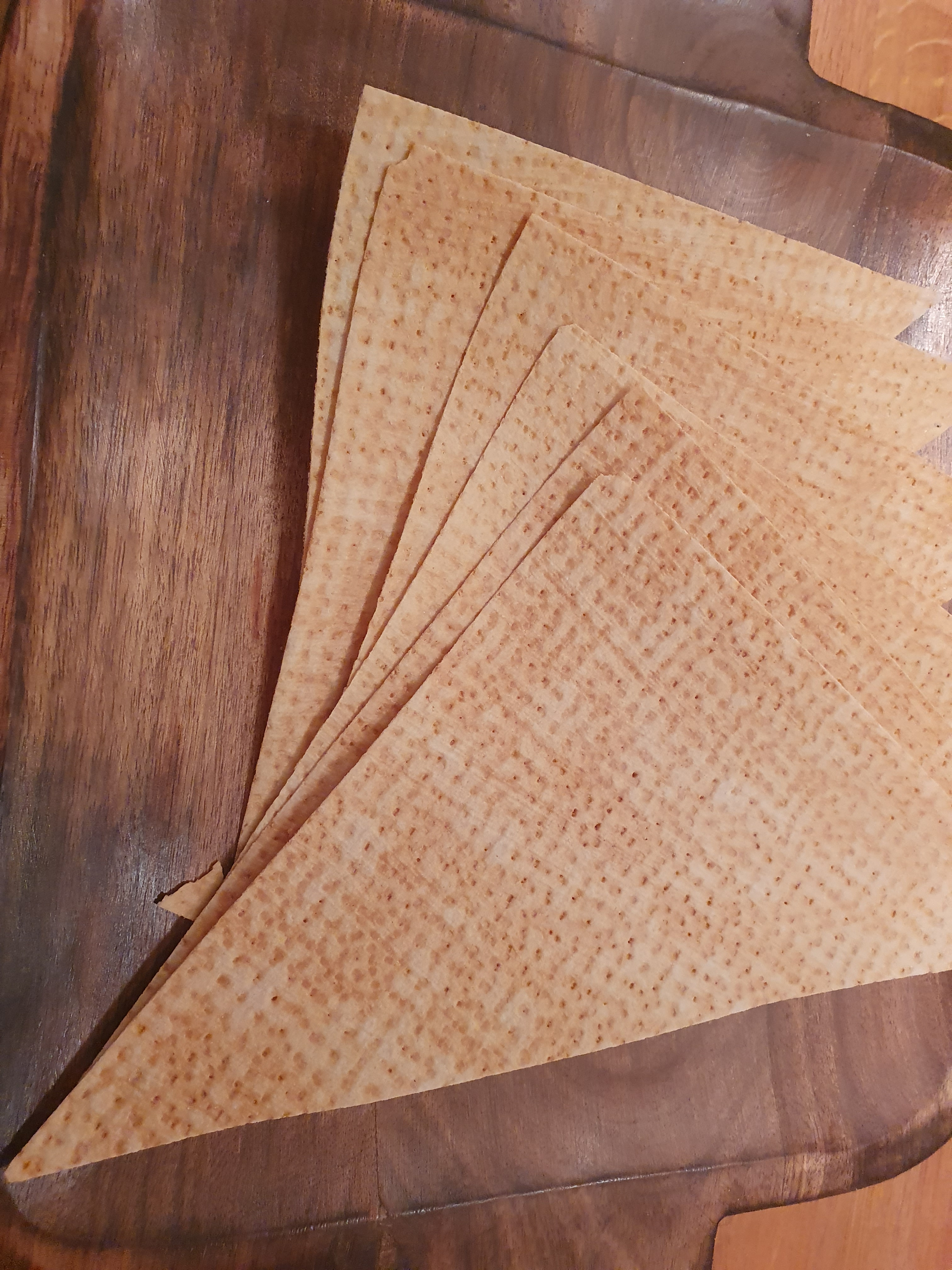
Skjenning, a type of flatbread from the middle of Norway, where one side of the flatbread is sugared.

Skjenning is a triangular, leaf-thin flatbread that is coated with freshly strained milk and sugar on one side. In Inntrøndelag (the inner parts of middle Norway, consisting of the inner areas of the Trondheim Fjord and Snåsavatnet), skjenning is traditionally used as a condiment to sodd. The name comes from older dialects of Norwegian, «å skinne» (to shine), because the side of the flatbread that is sugared has a shine to it.

Skjenning is made from a dough of boiled, mashed potatoes and wheat flour. When rolling out the flatbread, barley flour is used, and during the cooking process, one side is coated with a mixture of milk and sugar.

The flatbread is quartered while still on the griddle, and then split further into triangular pieces before being placed under weight to prevent it from curling up.

Although now primarily found in use in Trøndelag, Gerhard Schøning describes a similar flatbread in his travel journals from 1773, where skinna-brød is used as a condiment at weddings in Romsdal. Skjenning is a Protected designation of origin (PDO) product, meaning it is supposed to be baked in the Innherred area (Consisting of the municipalities of Levanger, Steinkjer, Snåsa, Inderøy, and Verdal). The dough must consist of potato, wheat, barley, rye, sugar, salt and water. It must be brushed with a milk- and sugar brine on one side during cooking. The protected recipe requires at least the main ingredients, potato and wheat flour, to be grown and refined in Innherred, and must be at least 75% of the total contents of the dough.
