= Gravlax =

Nordic dish consisting of raw salmon cured in salt, sugar, and dill

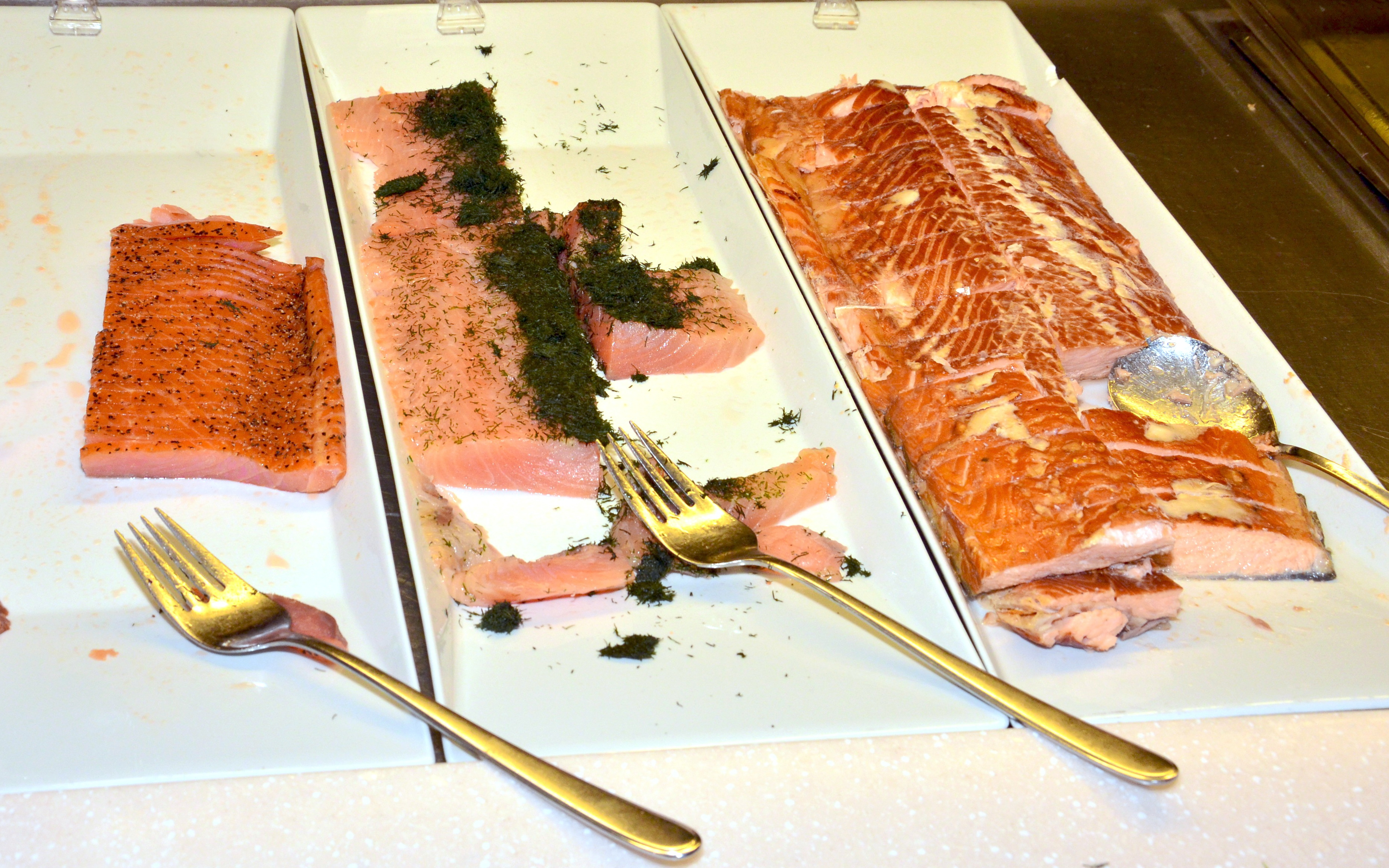
- Salmon dishes: gravlax in the middle, cold-smoked on the left and warm-smoked on the right
- Alternative names: Gravad lax, grav(ad)laks, gravad laks
- Course: Hors d'oeuvre
- Place of origin: Nordic countries
- Main ingredients: salmon, salt, sugar, dill/spruce

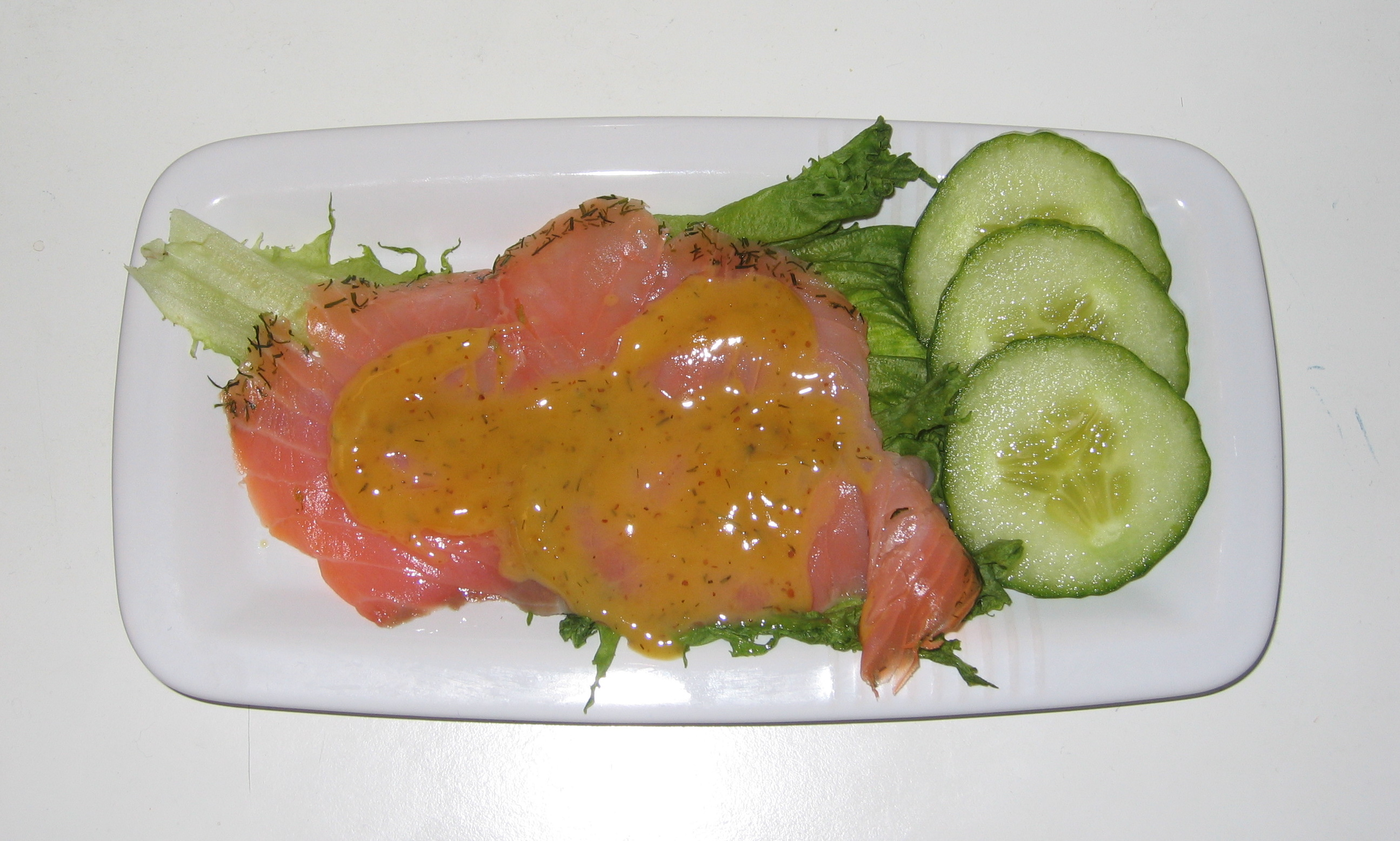
Gravlax with hovmästarsås (a mustard and dill sauce)

Gravlax (Swedish: [ˈgrɑ̂ːvlakːs]), graavilohi (Finnish: [ˈɡrɑ̝ːʋiˌlo̞ɦi]), gravad lax, gravlaks or graved salmon is a Nordic dish consisting of salmon that is cured using a mix of salt, sugar and dill. It is garnished with fresh dill or spruce twigs and may occasionally be cold-smoked after it is cured. Gravlax is usually served as an appetizer, sliced thinly and accompanied by a dill and mustard sauce known as hovmästarsås (also known in Sweden as gravlaxsås, in Norway as sennepssaus, literally 'mustard sauce', in Denmark as rævesovs, literally 'fox sauce', in Iceland as graflaxsósa, and in Finland as hovimestarinkastike, literally 'butler's sauce'), either on bread or with boiled potatoes.

== Etymology ==
The word gravlax comes from the Northern Germanic word gräva/grave ('to dig'; modern sense 'to cure (fish)') which goes back to the Proto-Germanic *grabą, *grabō ('hole in the ground; ditch, trench; grave') and the Indo-European root *gʰrebʰ- 'to dig, to scratch, to scrape', and lax/laks, 'salmon'.

== History ==
During the Middle Ages, gravlax was made by fishermen, who salted the salmon and lightly fermented it by burying it in the sand above the high-tide line. Perhaps the oldest reference is found in 1348 in Diplomatarium Norvegicum as the nickname of a man named Óláfr, who was a delegate in a salmon fishery.

Fermentation is no longer used in the production process. Instead the salmon is "buried" in a dry marinade of salt, sugar, and dill, and cured for between twelve hours and a few days. As the salmon cures, osmosis moves moisture out of the fish and into the salt and sugar, turning the dry mixture into a highly concentrated brine, which can be used in Scandinavian cooking as part of a sauce. This same method of curing can be employed for any fatty fish, but salmon is the most commonly used.

== See also ==
- Cured fish – Fish subjected to fermentation, pickling or smoking
- Carpaccio – Thin pieces of fish or meat, served raw as an appetiser
- Gwamegi – Korean dried fish preparation
- Hákarl – National dish of Iceland consisting of fermented shark
- List of hors d'oeuvre
- List of raw fish dishes
- Lox – Brined salmon
- Rakfisk – Norwegian fermented fish dish made from trout or char
- Sashimi – Japanese dish of raw fish
- Surströmming – Swedish fermented Baltic Sea herring
