= Flatbrød =

Norwegian unleavened bread

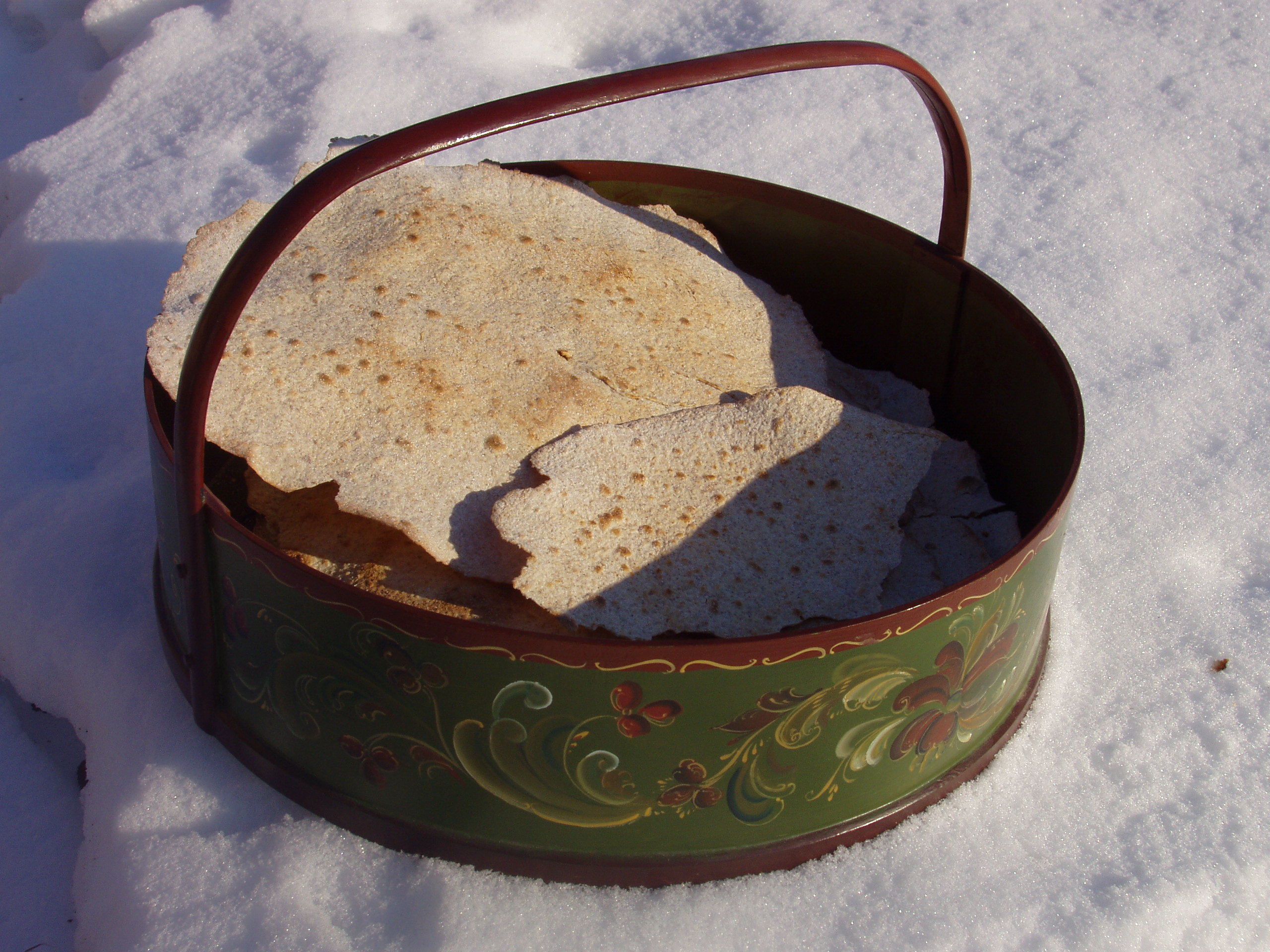
- Flatbrød in a Brødkorg
- Type: Flatbread
- Place of origin: Norway
- Main ingredients: Barley flour, salt, water

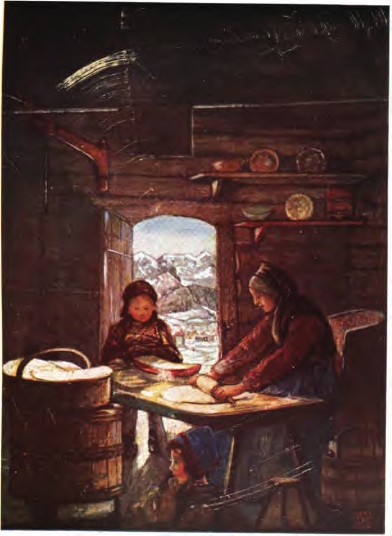
Making flatbrød ~ 1904, Norway

Flatbrød (literally "flat-bread") is a traditional Norwegian unleavened bread which is usually eaten with fish, salted meats, and soups. Originally it was the staple food of Norwegian farmers, shepherds and peasants. Flat bread is dry and free from water so it is possible to store it for a long period of time.

== Background ==
The basic ingredients are barley flour, salt, and water, though many varieties exist which incorporate other staples.

It was once generally eaten in all meals, most often with cured herring and cold boiled potato, often along with sour cream and/or butter. It may also accompany betasuppe, a traditional meat soup or lobscouse, a traditional stew.

The thinner the bread is, the better it is. It is rolled and then cooked on a large griddle. The tradition of making flat bread used to be passed down through generation after generation by housewives, and each person had her own recipe for preparing it. It is still an important part of Norwegian food traditions, particularly in the countryside.

== See also ==
- Crispbread
- Flatbread
- Norwegian cuisine
