= Sodd =

Traditional Norwegian soup

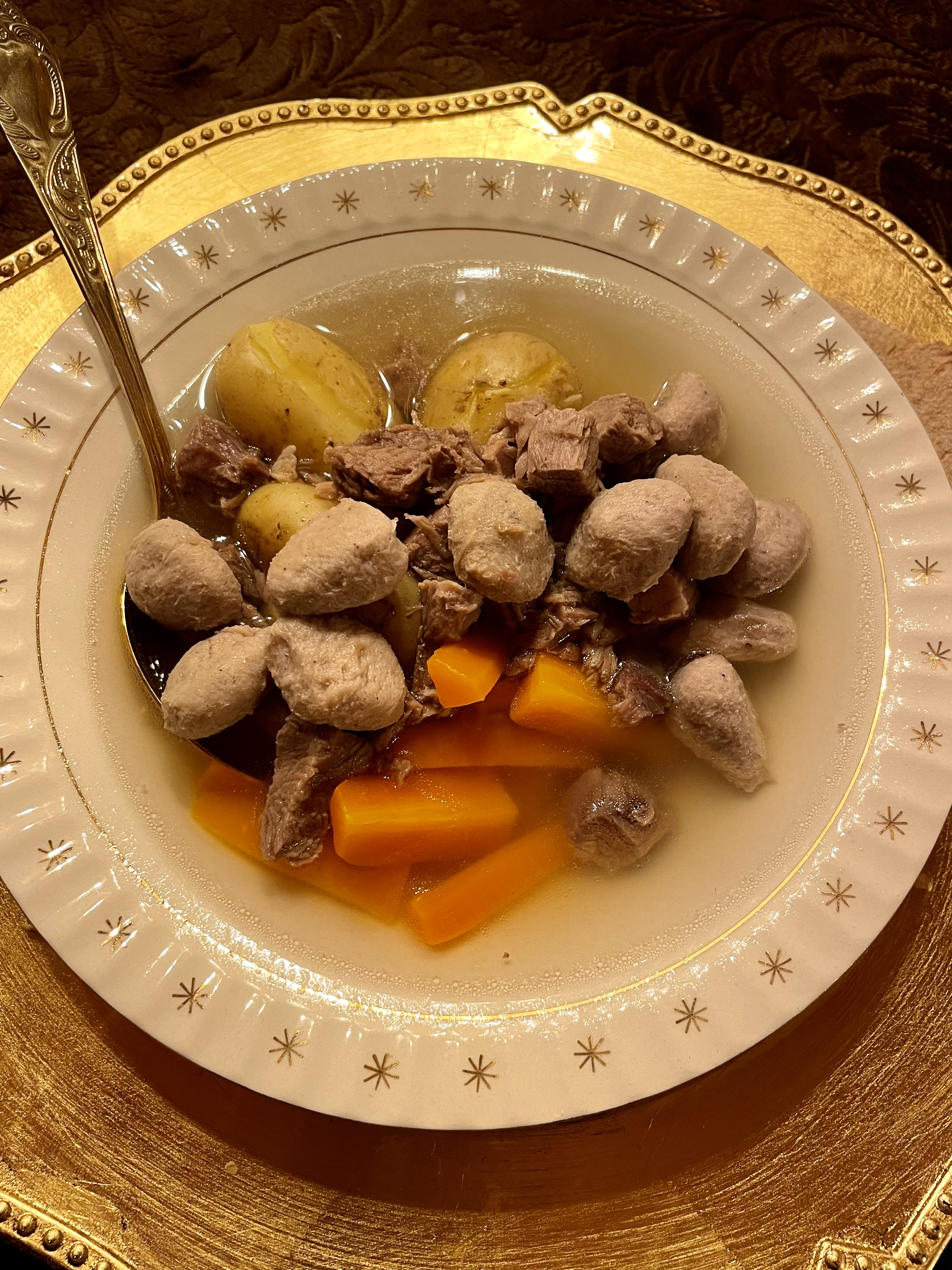
A bowl of Inderøysodd with boiled potatoes and carrots.

Sodd is a traditional Norwegian soup made with cooked mutton and meatballs made with lamb or beef. Potatoes and carrots are included in a clear, fragrant broth. In what is considered the proper way of serving, both the potatoes and carrots should be boiled separately and then only included upon serving. This is done at the table, where people plate their own servings.

== History ==
Sodd is described in Håkon the Good's saga from the 13th century, where Håkon the Good had to eat the sodd from the sacrificial animal during a feast at Lade. Sodd has been considered a festive food in large parts of Norway.

== Background ==
The meatballs are commonly flavored with ginger and nutmeg. It is traditional food most associated with the region of Trøndelag where it is customarily served on festive occasions, such as weddings and confirmation ceremonies.

== See also ==
- List of meat and potato dishes
