= Gamalost =

Firm, moist, and coarse Norwegian cheese

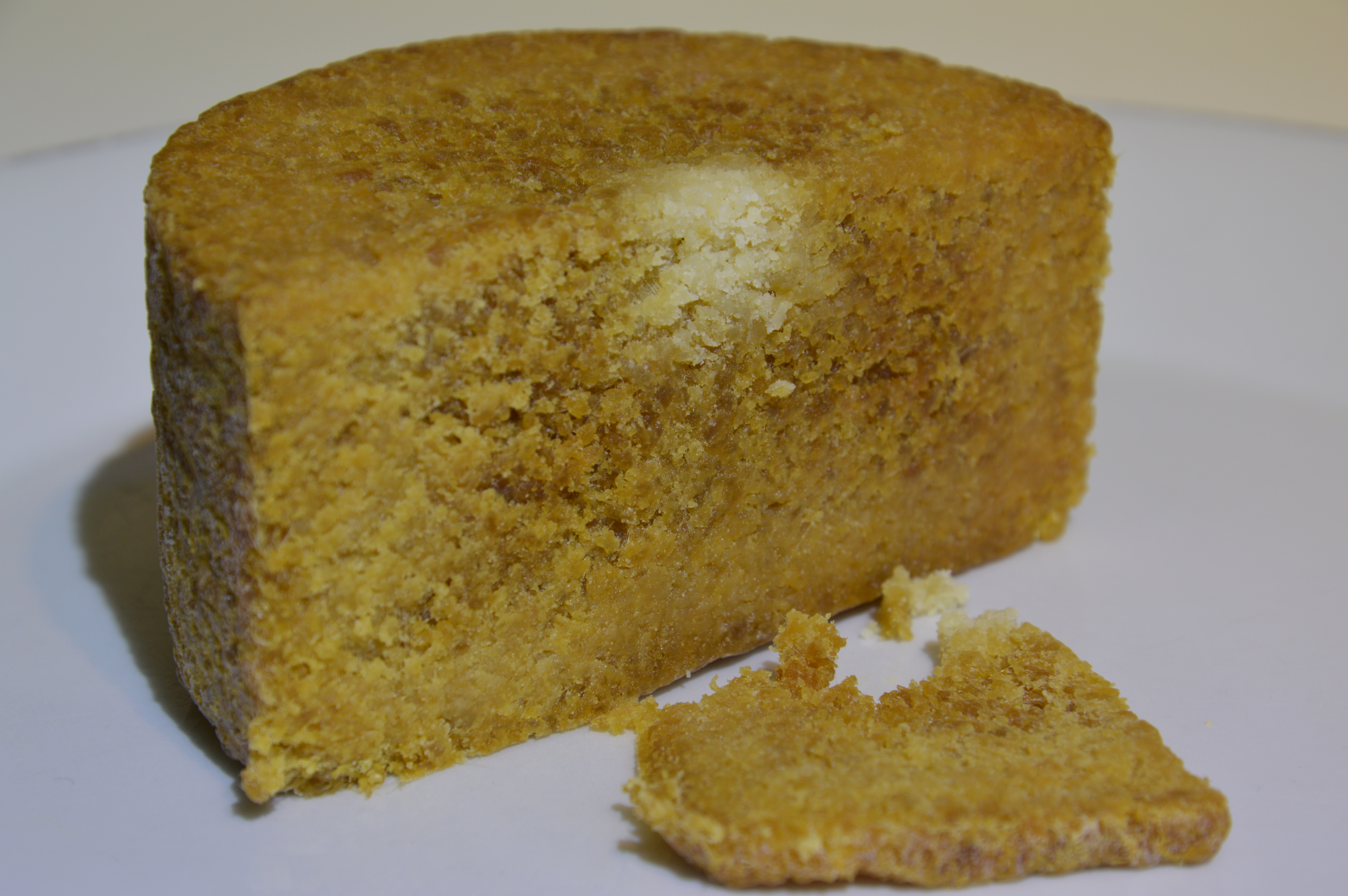
- Country of origin: Norway
- Region, town: Primarily Hardanger and Sogn
- Source of milk: Skimmed cow's milk
- Pasteurized: Yes
- Texture: Firm
- Aging time: Four to five weeks
- Certification: N/A

Gamalost (Nynorsk; gammelost or gammalost in Bokmål) is a traditional Norwegian cheese.

== History ==
Gamalost, which translates as 'old cheese', was once a staple of the Norwegian diet. Like many traditional Norwegian foods, such as flatbread, dry salted meats and stockfish, gamalost could be stored for long periods without refrigeration. The brownish-yellow cheese is firm, moist, coarse and often granular. Gamalost is rich in protein with low fat content, measuring 1% fat and 50% protein.

== Production ==
To make gamalost, lactic starter is added to skimmed cow's milk, causing it to sour. After several days of souring, the milk is slowly heated, before the curds are separated and pressed into forms. After removal from the forms, mold is introduced onto the surface of the cheese, either by exposure to the wooden walls of the form that is only used for gamalost, or rubbed on by hand in the traditional method. The cheese is then allowed to cure for four to five weeks. The ripening happens from outside inwards, so the center might be lighter than the parts near the exterior.

Gamalost production is very labor-intensive, particularly if traditional methods are used. Everything depends on the proper fermentation and maturation. It is not made in sufficient quantity for mass export. As such, it is rare to find the cheese outside Norway. Commercial production has principally been limited to the Tine facility in Vik.

== Gamalost Festival ==
Gamalost Festival (Gamalostfestivalen) is an annual event held in Vik in Sogn at the beginning of summer every year.

== See also ==
- List of cheeses

== Other sources ==
- Jenkins, Steven (1996). Cheese Primer. Workman Publishing. p. 444. ISBN 0-89480-762-5.
- Sanders, George (1953). "Cheese Varieties and Descriptions". AGR. Handbook. U.S. Department of Agriculture. Archived from the original on 2007-03-29.
- Ehlers, S.; Hurt, J. (2008). The Complete Idiot's Guide to Cheeses of the World. Alpha Books. p. 102. ISBN 978-1-59257-714-9.

== Related reading ==
- Diehl, Kari Schoening (2012) The Everything Nordic Cookbook (Quarto - Everything Books) ISBN 9781440531866
- Scott, Astrid Karlsen (2015) Authentic Norwegian Cooking: Traditional Scandinavian Cooking Made Easy (Skyhorse Publishing, Inc.) ISBN 9781632207753
