= Danish cuisine =

Culinary traditions of Denmark

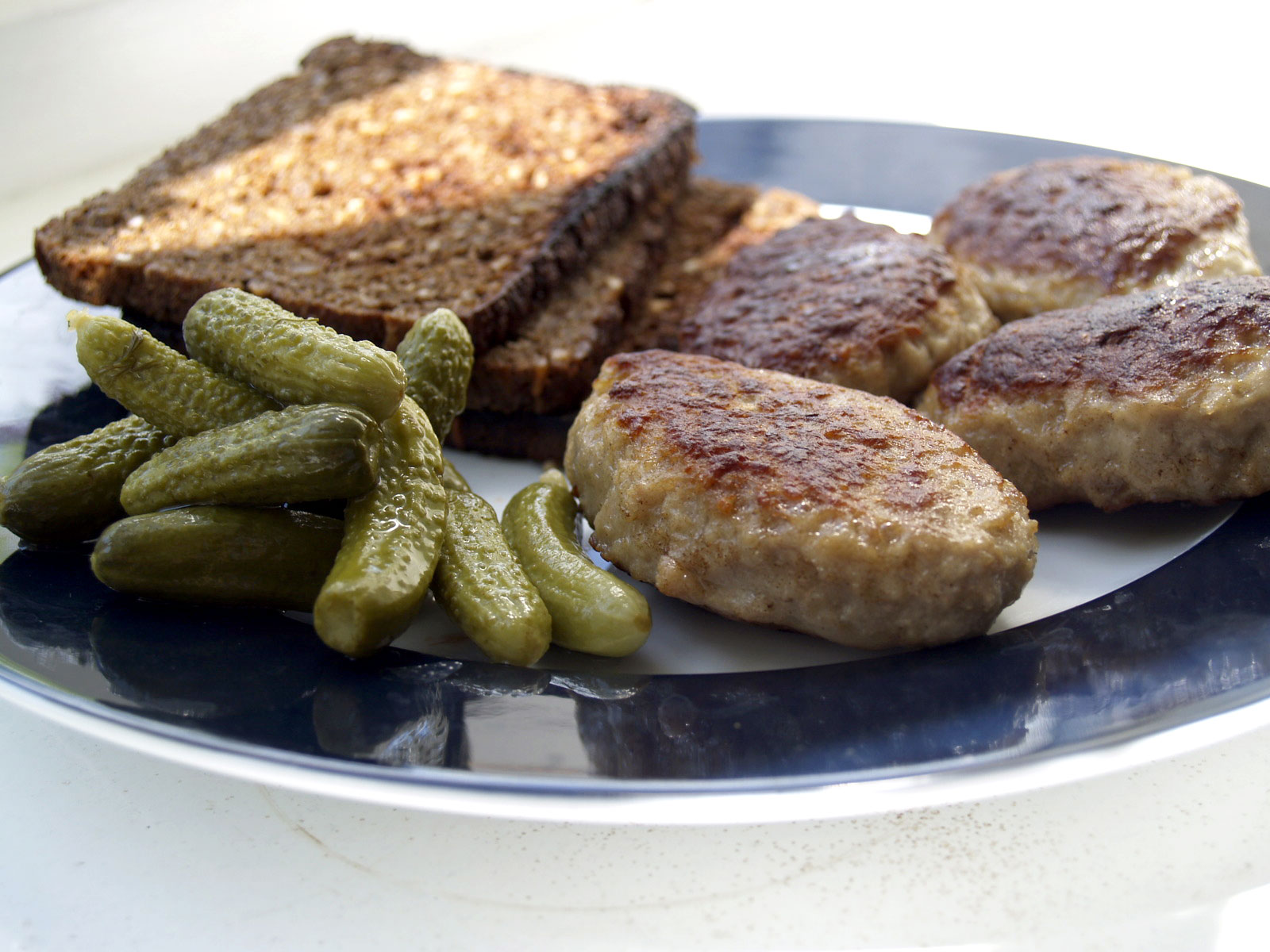
Frikadeller (meat balls) with rugbrød (rye bread) and gherkins

Danish cuisine originated from the peasant population's own local produce and was enhanced by cooking techniques developed in the late 19th century and the wider availability of goods during and after the Industrial Revolution. Open sandwiches, known as smørrebrød, which in their basic form are the usual fare for lunch, can be considered a national speciality when prepared and garnished with a variety of ingredients. Hot meals are typically prepared with meat or fish. Substantial meat and fish dishes includes flæskesteg (roast pork with crackling) and kogt torsk (poached cod) with mustard sauce and trimmings. Ground meats (pork, veal or beef) became widespread during the industrial revolution and traditional dishes that are still popular include frikadeller (meat balls), karbonader (breaded pork patties) and medisterpølse (fried sausage). Denmark is known for its Carlsberg and Tuborg beers and for its akvavit and bitters, but amongst the Danes themselves imported wine has gained steadily in popularity since the 1960s.

Cooking in Denmark has always been inspired by foreign and continental practises and the use of imported tropical spices like cinnamon, cardamom, nutmeg and black pepper can be traced to the Danish cuisine of the Middle Ages and some even to the Vikings.

Since the early 2000s, some Danish chefs have developed the new Danish cuisine, an way of cooking based on high-quality local produce. This new philosophy and cuisine has attracted the attention of, and been celebrated by, the international gourmet community. It has contributed with a considerable number of highly acclaimed restaurants in Copenhagen and the province, with some of them awarded Michelin stars.

== History ==
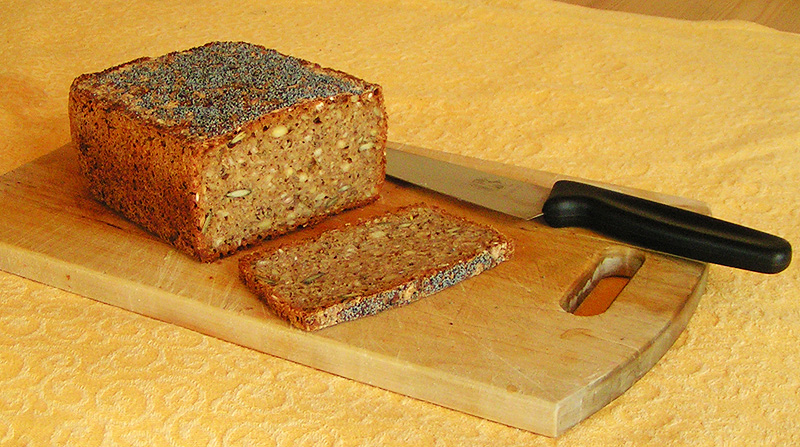
A loaf of Danish rye bread (rugbrød)

Danish cooking is rooted in the peasant dishes served across the country before the Industrial Revolution in 1860. It was based on the need to make use of natural products available on or near the family farm. As a result, a variety of brassicas, bread, fish, pork, and later potatoes, were eaten everywhere. Families had their own storage of long-lasting dry products, rye for making bread, barley for beer, dried peas for soup, and smoked or salted pork. Industrialization brought an increase in the consumption of fresh meat and vegetables, but rye bread and potatoes continued to be staples. With the arrival of dairy cooperatives in the second half of the 19th century, milk also gained favor, although all kinds of dairy products have been consumed in lesser quantities for millennia. The introduction of wood-burning stoves and meat grinders contributed to a range of new dishes including frikadeller (meat balls), medisterpølse (fried ground meat sausage), hakkebøf (meat patties of beef), karbonader (breaded pork meat patties), meat loafs, roast pork, poached cod, and stegt rødspætte (breaded plaice). Desserts of stewed fruits or berries such as rødgrød date from the same period, as do a large variety of cakes and cookies.

Over the centuries, sausage, which was not only economical but could be kept for long periods, was together with rye bread behind the development of smørrebrød. By the end of the 18th century, there were several different kinds of sausage but the preparation of cold meat products developed rapidly in the 1840s when the French butcher Francois Louis Beauvais opened a business in Copenhagen. In the 1880s, Oskar Davidsen opened a restaurant specializing in smørrebrød with a long list of open sandwiches. Leverpostej (liver pâté) became available in grocery shops at the end of the 19th century but it was some time before its price was comparable with that of cold cuts. Around the same time, the one-hour lunch break which had allowed people to enjoy a hot midday meal was shortened to 30 minutes, encouraging them to take a few pieces of smørrebrød to work in a lunch box. In the 1920s and 1930s, tomatoes and cucumbers were added as a topping to the cold cuts. In the 1940s, Henry Stryhn popularized leverpostej by making deliveries around Copenhagen on his bicycle.

In the 1960s and 1970s, with the availability of deep frozen goods, the concept of fast food arrived together with an interest in Mediterranean dishes as Danes travelled more widely. By the 1990s, ingredients were being imported from the south while new products were farmed at home, providing a basis for a developing interest in gourmet dishes. Much of the inspiration came from France, as Danish chefs went on television explaining how to prepare dishes such as canard à l'orange or authentic sauce Béarnaise. A younger generation of chefs soon started to travel abroad themselves, learning how to adapt the expertise of French and Spanish chefs to the use of local ingredients as a basis for creating beautifully presented, finely flavored Nordic dishes. As a result, in recent years Danish chefs have helped to put Denmark on the world gastronomic map, with several Michelin-starred restaurants in Copenhagen and the provinces.

=== New Danish cuisine ===
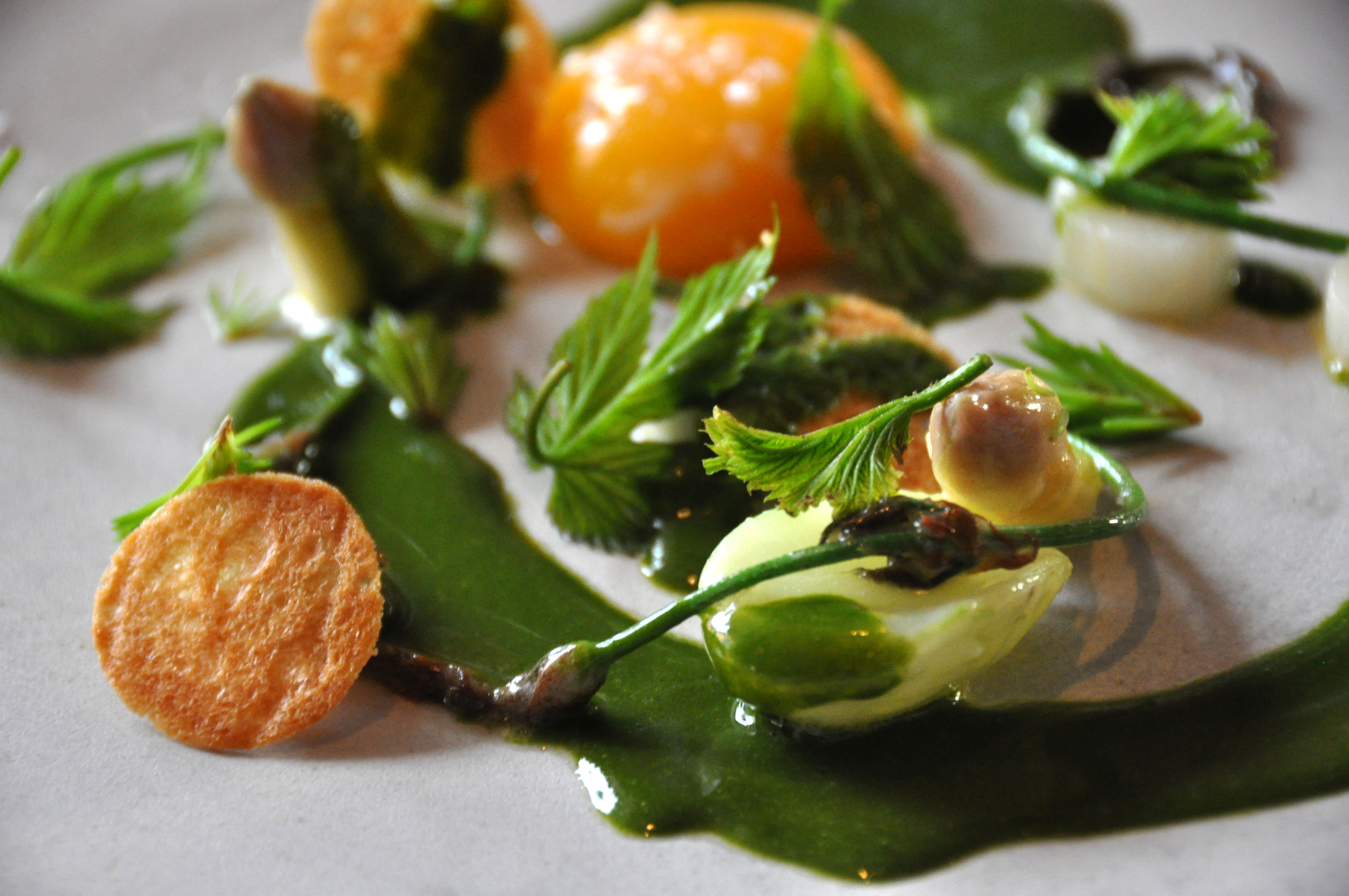
New Nordic dish made from local ingredients exclusively. "White asparagus with poached egg yolk and sauce of woodruff" at Restaurant Noma.

Danish cuisine has also taken advantage of the possibilities inherent in traditional recipes, building on the use of local products and techniques that have not been fully exploited. Local products such as rapeseed, oats, cheeses and older varieties of fruits are being rediscovered and prepared in new ways both by restaurants and at home, as interest in locally sourced organic foods continues to grow. The Nordic Council's agricultural and food ministers have supported these developments in the form of a manifesto designed to encourage the use of natural products from the Nordic countries in the food production industry, while promoting the "purity, freshness, simplicity and ethics" associated with the region's cuisine.

In 2010, 2011, 2012, and 2014 the Copenhagen restaurant Noma (short for nordisk mad – Nordic food) was named the world's best restaurant by the magazine Restaurant.

In 2012, the Danish chef and food activist Claus Meyer had his own show about Nordic cuisine on BBC Lifestyle. His recent book Almanak contains 365 new cuisine recipes, one for each day of the year.

== Main meals ==
Most Danes have three regular meals a day, usually consisting of a cold breakfast with coffee or tea, a cold lunch at work and a hot dinner at home with the family. Some also have a snack in the middle of the afternoon or in the late evening. Meat, especially pork, is by far the most common ingredient of hot meals. It is usually accompanied by potatoes and sometimes by another vegetable such as carrots or lettuce. Most hot meals consist of only one course: starters are fairly rare but desserts such as ice cream or fruit are a little more frequent. Beer and wine are fairly common drinks at mealtimes but so are soft drinks, plain water and, to a lesser extent, milk and coffee. Many families follow the old traditions. Mothers and fathers cook together and teach their children how to cook. Meals form an important part of family life, allowing for socializing and contributing to the sense of the wellbeing and coziness known as hygge.

=== Breakfast ===
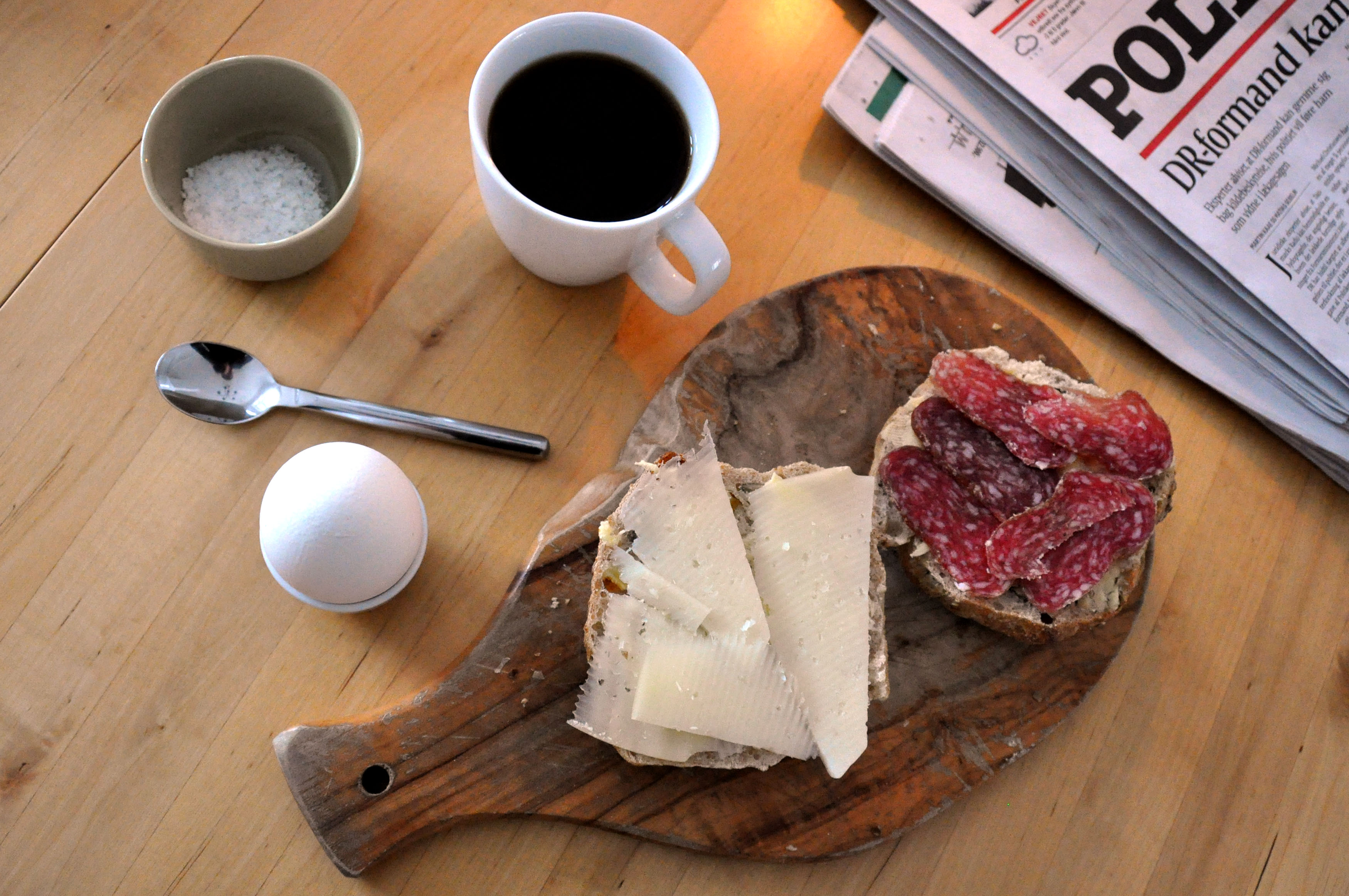
Bread with cheese and salami, soft-boiled egg and coffee; a typical everyday breakfast.

The basic Danish breakfast consists of coffee, or tea, and rye bread, white bread, or rolls with cheese or jam. Bread at breakfast time most often comes in the form of a white loaf known as franskbrød (French bread), a baguette, or a variety of white or brown rolls (boller, birkes, rundstykker, håndværkere) or croissants. The bread is usually buttered and topped with soft or creamy cheese, sausage, pâté, cured cold meat or jam. On festive gatherings or when time permits, as on Sundays, for example, a variety of bread rolls can be included as well as wienerbrød (Vienna bread), as Danish pastry is known in Denmark. Fruit juice, mostly orange or apple, and sometimes a bitter such as Gammel Dansk, may also be served, especially when breakfast is served to guests or on special occasions and celebrations like birthdays and anniversaries. In Danish hotels, soft-boiled eggs and cold meats are usually served for breakfast, too.

On weekdays, various cereals, such as corn flakes, muesli or rolled oats, are often served for breakfast with just cold milk and sugar. Soured milk products are popular, too, and are served either plain or with cereals or fruit. The typical local soured milk product of ymer is topped with ymerdrys, a mixture of dried grated rye bread and brown sugar. Porridges such as oatmeal and a traditional local porridge called øllebrød are also popular on work days. Øllebrød, a thin porridge cooked with bits of rye bread, hvidtøl, water, and sugar, and served with milk or sometimes whipped cream, is gaining in popularity as reflected on the breakfast menus of many cafés.

=== Lunch ===
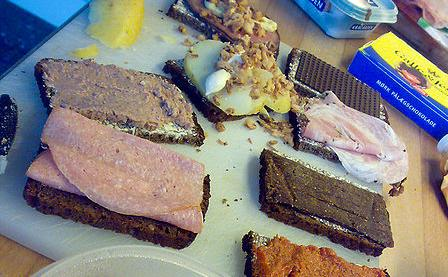
Slices to carry to work or school in a lunchbox are prepared in the morning.

Rather than eating at home, most Danes have a quick lunch at work or school either in the cafeteria, if there is one, or more often in the form of a packed lunch or madpakke prepared before they leave home. Lunch is usually a cold meal consisting of a few simply prepared pieces of smørrebrød (often referred to as håndmad, i.e. hand-food) with slices of cold meat, sliced sausage or hard-boiled egg. Leverpostej, a liver pâté prepared from pig's liver and lard, is also frequently used as a spread.

=== Dinner ===
For the average family, dinner is the one meal of the day where everyone can be gathered, due to the pressures of the modern life where both parents are likely to work, and the children are in school or pre-school institutions. Dinner usually consists of just one main course, often a meat dish with potatoes and a vegetable or salad. Starters are seldom served at home. If there is a dessert, it is likely to be ice cream or a fruit dish. Much more substantial dinners are served on weekends, special occasions or when guests have been invited.

Confusingly, the evening meal is sometimes called middag (midday) because hot meals were formerly served in the middle of the day. The variety of evening meals has developed as a result of the increasing availability of foods from supermarkets as well as the development and growth of the local food industry. As a result of American influence, there is now considerable interest in barbecues, salad buffets and ready-to-serve dishes. Italian-inspired preparations, including pizza and pasta, have also become common options. Meat is very popular, pork ranking as the most frequently served. Cuts are often prepared in the frying pan and accompanied by gravy and potatoes.

== Open sandwiches ==
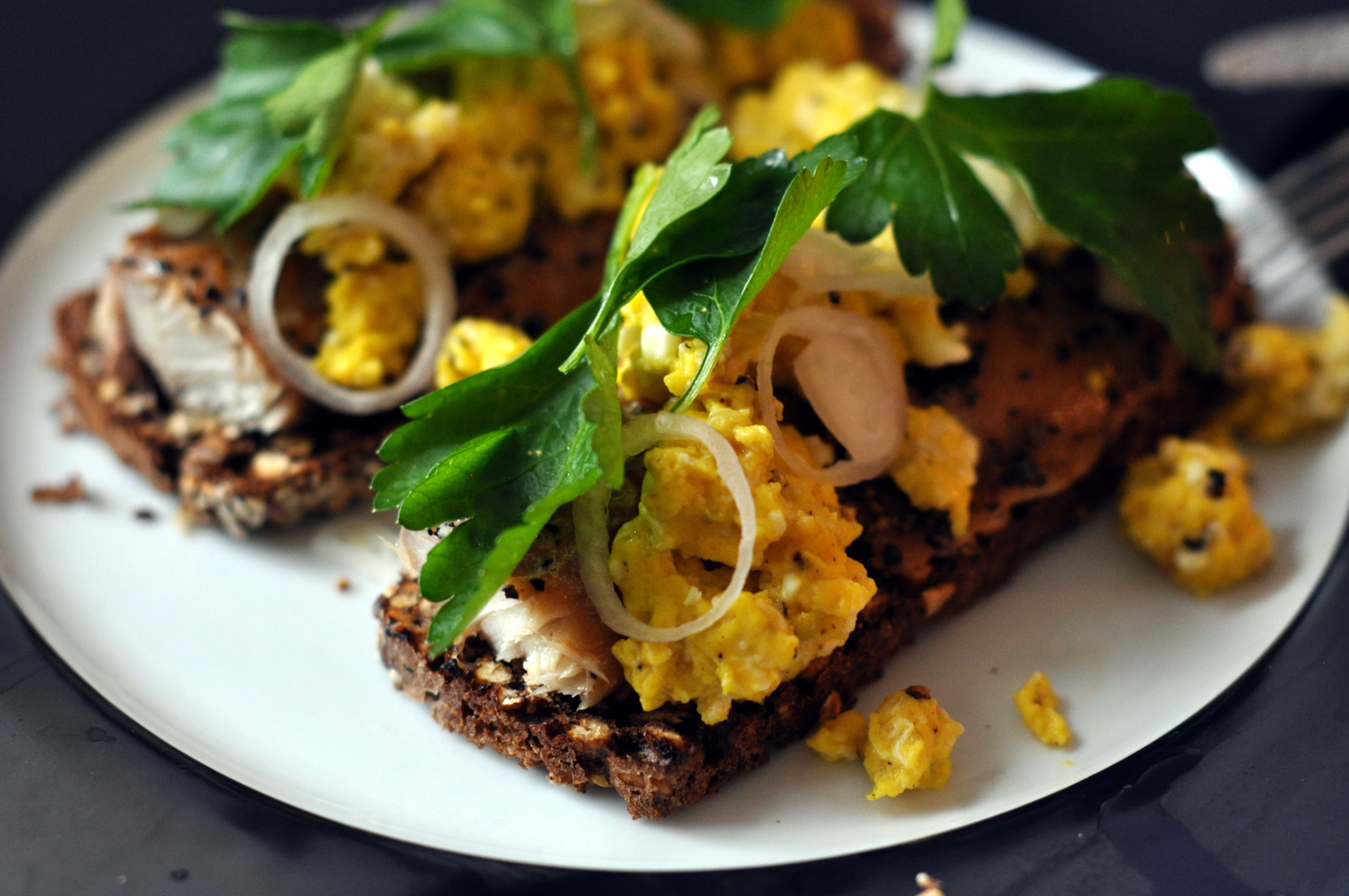
"Smørrebrød". Danish open sandwiches are usually made with dark rye bread, but come with a large variety of suitable toppings

Smørrebrød (originally smør og brød, meaning "butter and bread") usually consists of a piece of buttered rye bread (rugbrød), a dense, dark brown bread. Pålæg (meaning put-on, actually "that which is laid on [the bread]"), the topping, then among others can refer to commercial or homemade cold cuts, pieces of meat or fish, cheese or spreads. More elaborate, finely decorated varieties have contributed to the international reputation of the Danish open sandwich or smørrebrød. A slice or two of pålæg is placed on the buttered bread and decorated with accompaniments.

Some traditional compositions include:

- Dyrlægens natmad (veterinarian's late-night snack). On a piece of dark rye bread, a layer of liver pâté (leverpostej), topped with a slice of saltkød (salted beef) and a slice of sky (meat jelly). This is all garnished with raw onion rings and garden cress.
- Røget ål med røræg, smoked eel on dark rye bread, topped with scrambled eggs, chives and a slice of lemon.
- Leverpostej, warm rough-chopped liver pâté served on dark rye bread, often topped with bacon and/or sauteed mushrooms. Additions can include lettuce, and sliced pickled/fresh cucumber.
- Roast beef, thinly sliced and served on dark rye bread, topped with a portion of remoulade, and decorated with a sprinkling of shredded horseradish and crispy fried onions.
- Ribbensteg, thin slices of roast pork with crackling, served on dark rye bread with rødkål (pickled red cabbage), and decorated with a slice of orange.
- Rullepølse, spiced meat roll with a slice of meat jelly, onions, tomatoes and parsley. Usually pork meat, but sometimes lamb.
- Tartar, with salt and pepper, served on dark rye bread, topped with raw onion rings, grated horseradish and a raw egg yolk.
- Røget laks. Slices of cold-smoked salmon on white bread, topped with shrimp and garnished with a slice of lemon and fresh dill.
- Stjerneskud (Shooting star). On a base of buttered toast, two pieces of fish: a piece of steamed white fish (mostly plaice) on one half, a piece of fried, breaded plaice or rødspætte on the other half. On top is piled a mound of shrimp, which is then garnished with a dollop of mayonnaise, sliced cucumber, caviar or blackened lumpfish roe, and a lemon slice.

== Cold buffet ==
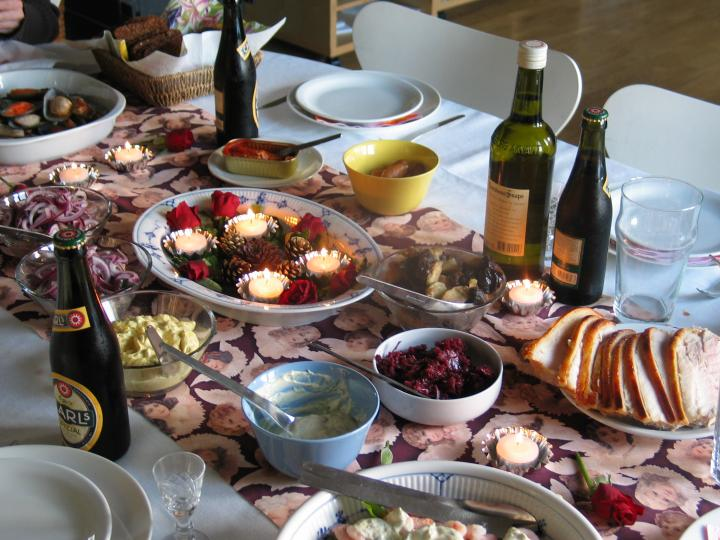
Det kolde bord with beer and snaps

Det kolde bord is a cold buffet served with bread on special occasions. The food is usually brought to the dining table and passed around family-style; the idea is similar to the Swedish counterpart, the smörgåsbord, but with slightly different ingredients. Det kolde bord is usually served at lunchtime, but may carry on into the evening.

The meal begins with seafood, usually pickled herring, or another herring dish. The cured and pickled herring fillets are typically made and served in a white and a red variety, but a multitude of pickled herring dishes exists. White herring is marinated in a clear, sweet and mildly spiced vinegar marinade while the sharper-tasting red herring is marinated in a red, seasoned vinegar marinade, owing the red colour to sandalwood. Other common variations include a variety of sour cream-based sauces, of which a curry-flavoured type is popular. Spegesild is usually served on buttered black rye bread, topped with onion rings, pickled capers and a glob of curry salad – a sour-cream-based sauce, flavored with curry and chopped pickles – and chopped hard-boiled eggs on the side. Other herring dishes commonly served at the cold buffet include stegte sild i eddike (fried herring in vinegar), consisting of rye-battered, fried fillets of herring in a spiced vinegar marinade, or the more elaborate silderet (herring dish) where the herring is arranged in a large serving dish with various side dishes such as warm boiled potatoes, raw onion, pickled capers and a dill-flavoured sour-cream or mayonnaise sauce, or diced apple, shredded horseradish and curry salad, as two common options. Other seafood dishes may include:

- Rejer (shrimp), usually served on white bread with mayonnaise and lemon
- Røget ål (smoked eel) with scrambled egg
- Gravad laks (salt-cured salmon) with a dill and mustard sauce
- Rødspættefilet (breaded filets of plaice), served hot with lemon and remoulade
- Røget laks (smoked salmon)
- Røget hellefisk (smoked halibut)

The cold table also consists of a wide variety of meat dishes and, despite its name, nearly always includes a few items which are served hot. Some of the more common components are:

- Frikadeller (meatballs), sometimes hot
- Leverpostej (liver paste), sometimes hot, with pickled beetroot, mushrooms or fried bacon
- Mørbradbøf (pork tenderloin), hot, with fried onions
- Flæskesteg (roast pork) with cracklings, usually with red cabbage
- Medisterpølse (a coarsely ground pork sausage, fried)
- Pariserbøf (ground beef steak), usually served hot on toast with pickles

There might also be cold cuts from ham, roast beef, salami, brisket of beef and spiced roulade. Det kolde bord usually include accompaniments such as potato salad, scrambled egg and a variety of salads. Desserts like fruit salad and fruit pies, as well as various cheeses, may also be served. Around Christmas, the buffet will sometimes include sylte (meat jelly from pork) and other Christmas-related specialties.

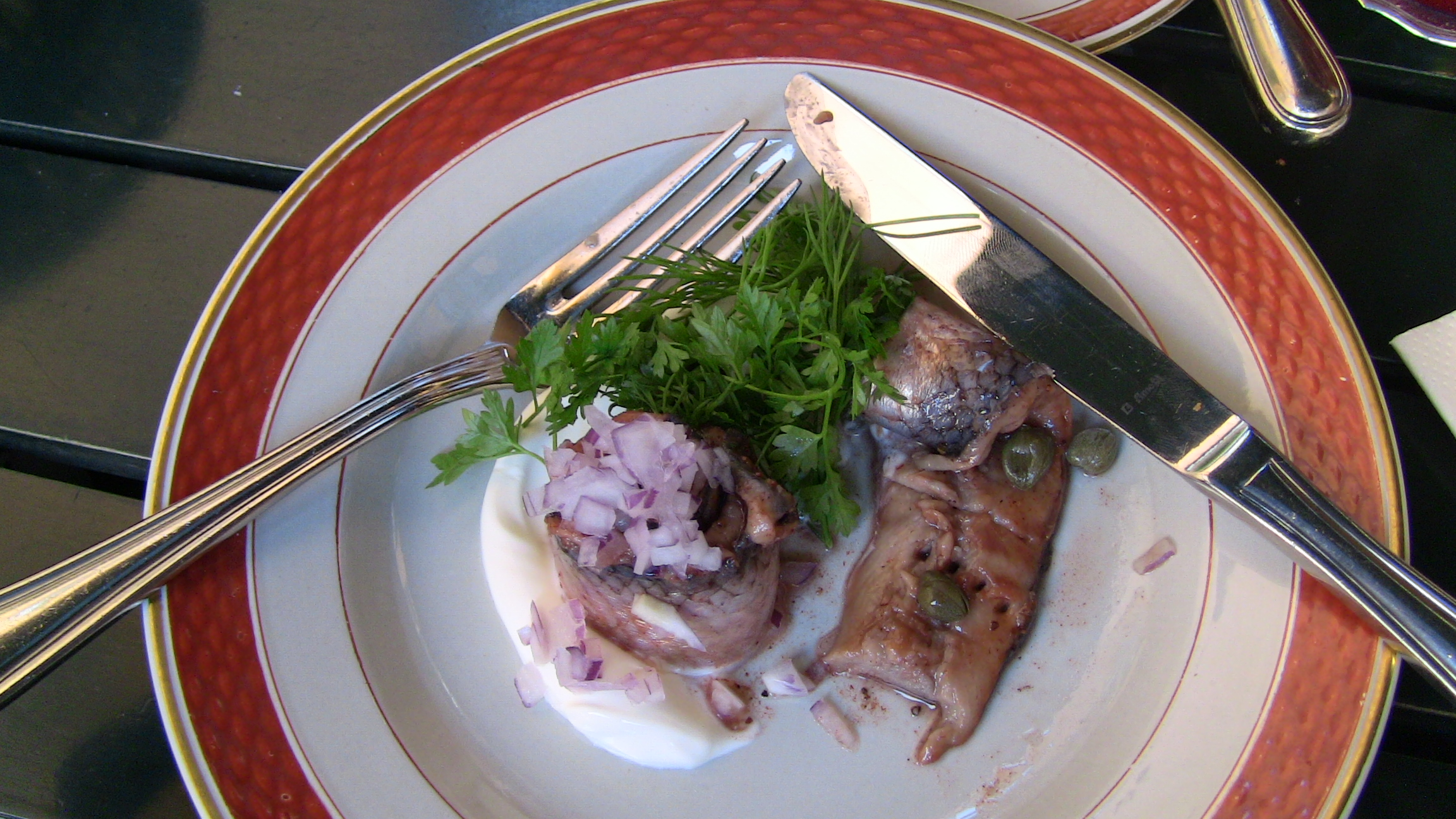
Spegesild, cold pickled herring

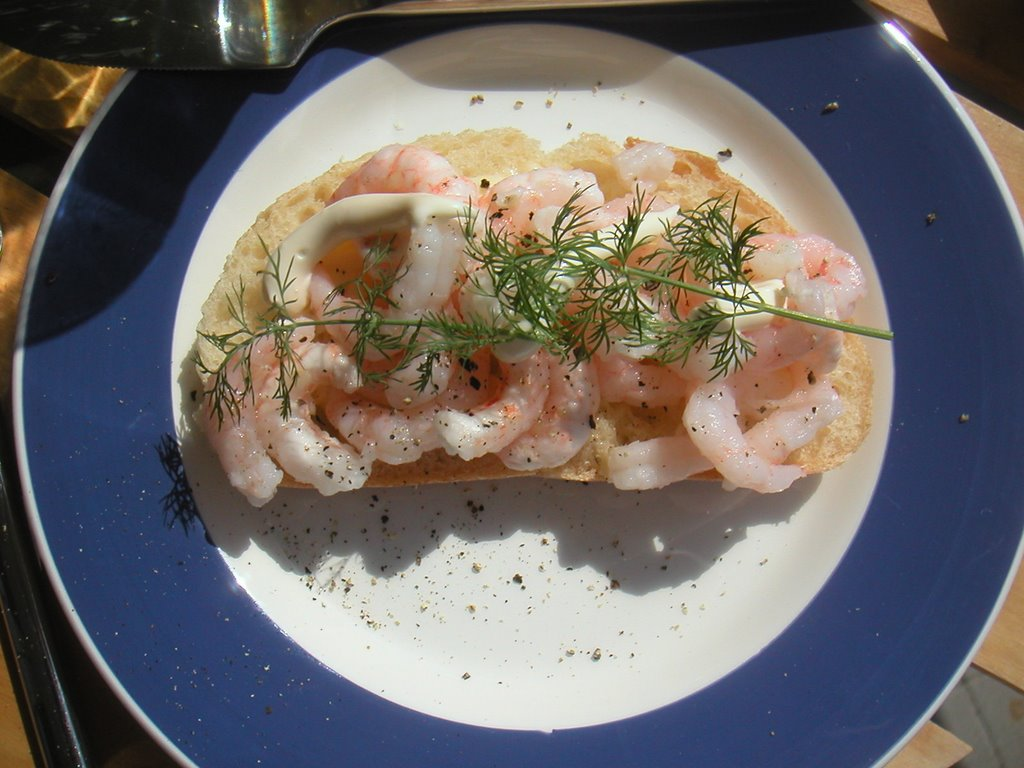
Shrimp on white bread

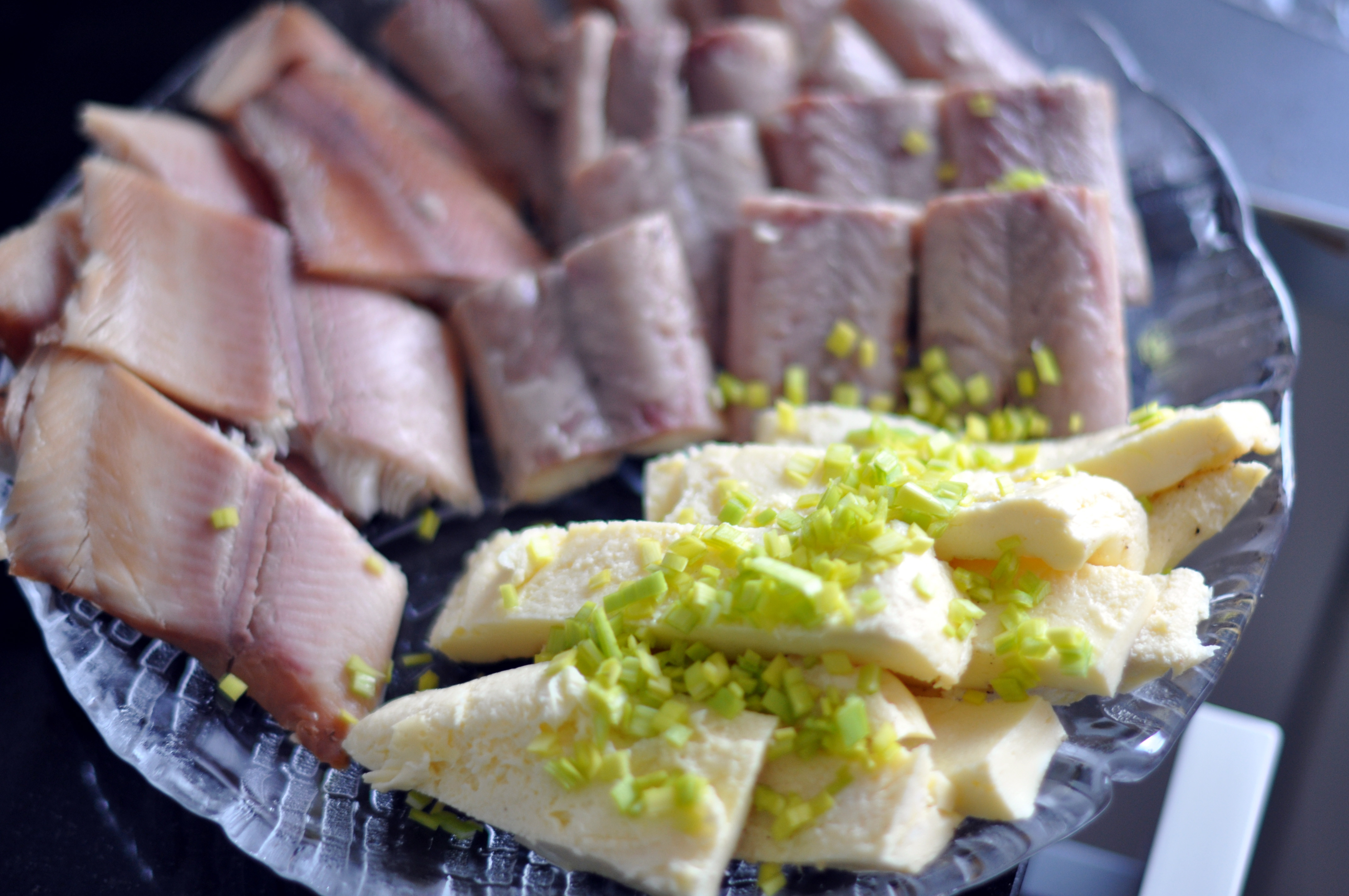
Smoked eel and trout with scrambled eggs

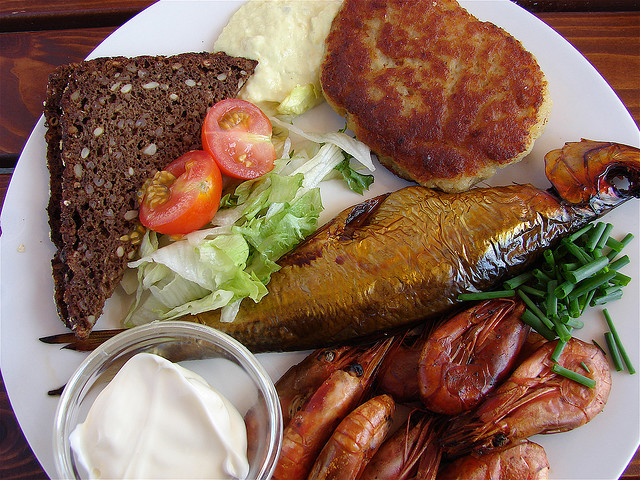
Fishcake, smoked herring and prawns with dark rye bread

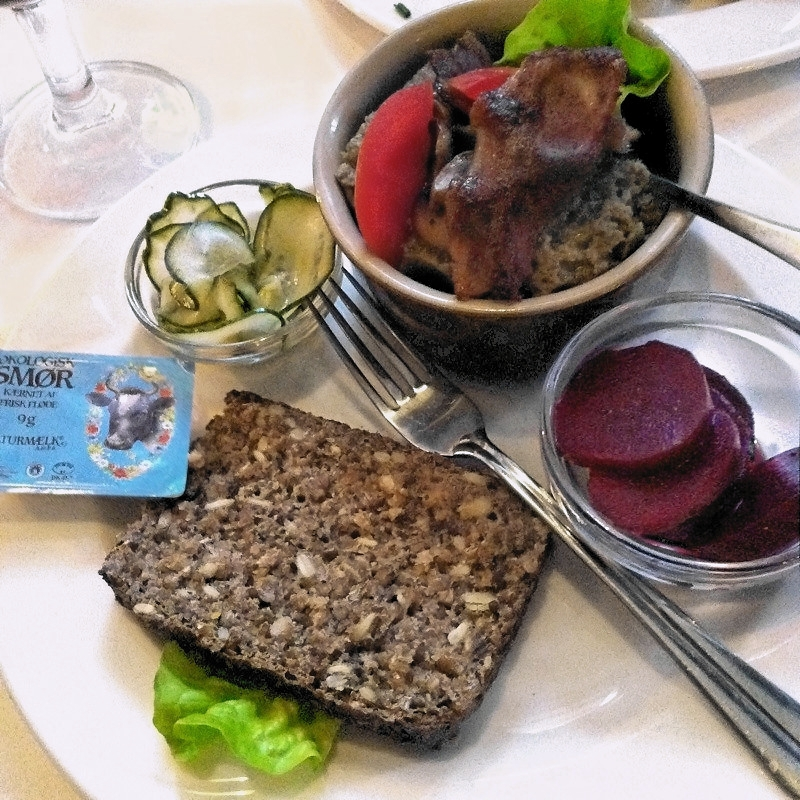
Leverpostej (hot) served with bacon and pickles

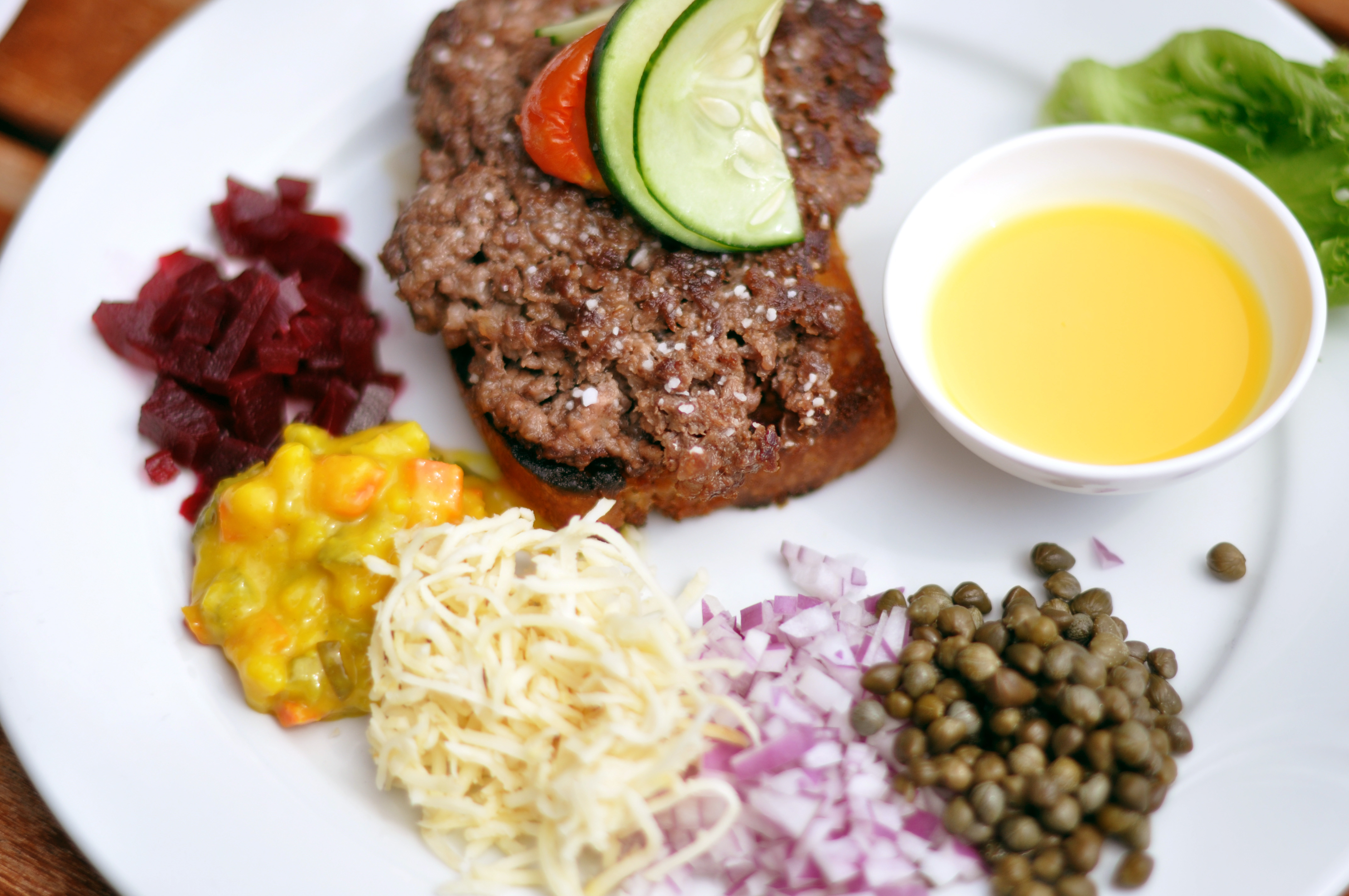
Pariserbøf with accompaniments

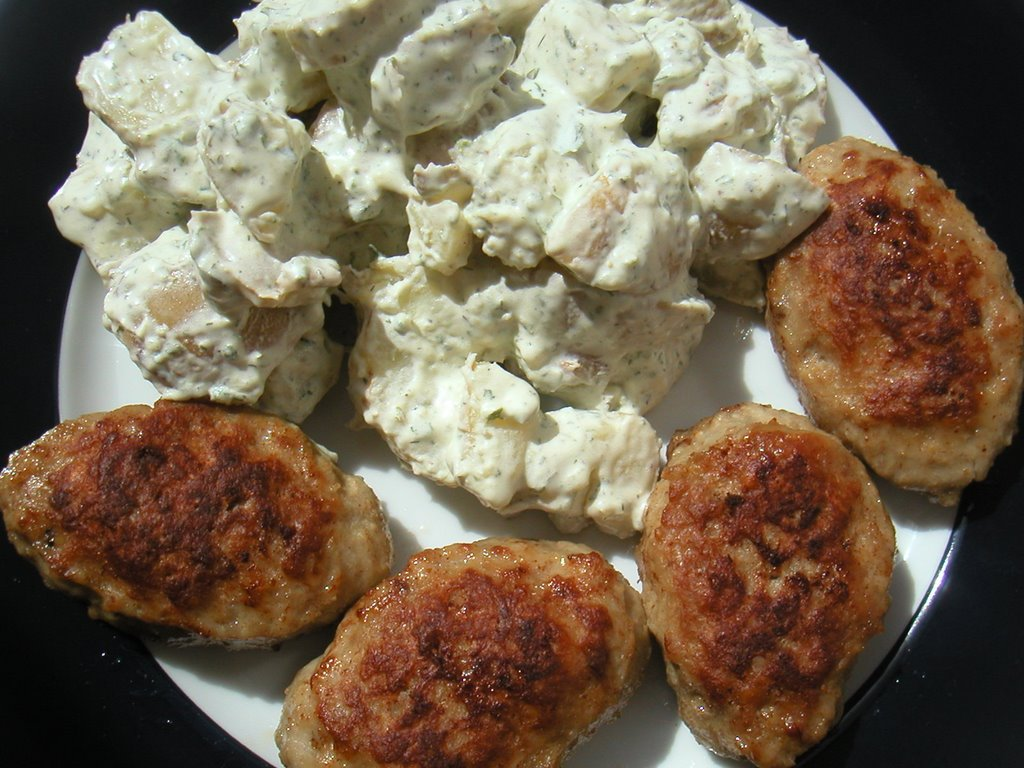
Frikadeller and potato salad

== Options for dinner ==
The everyday evening meal for most Danes consists of a main course and perhaps a dessert. At weekends and on special occasions, a more elaborate meal is served. Good restaurants usually serve a three-course dinner. While an ever-wider range of foreign foods are available in Denmark, traditional dishes are still popular. A selection of the more common options is given below.

=== Appetizer ===
The first course is typically fish or soup, although a wide variety of other appetizers are becoming more common. Common traditional appetisers include:

- Shellfish, including mussels, shrimp, oyster, crab and lobster; usually served poached with white bread and various toppings for an appetiser or small meal.
  - Shrimp (rejer) are mostly from Greenland or the North Atlantic. Fjord shrimp from Denmark are seasonal and less common; they are very small and flavorful, about the size of the smallest fingernail. Special shrimp appetisers are shrimp cocktail (rejecocktail), shrimp salad (with mayonnaise) and shrimp terrine. Apart from appetisers, shrimp also feature as toppings for some fish dishes.
  - Mussels (muslinger) are fished and farmed on a large scale in Danish waters and served poached. Blue mussels are the most common, but razor clams, green-lipped mussels and common cockles are sometimes served as well. As with shrimp, mussels may feature in some fish dishes.
  - Oysters are usually served raw, and sometimes smoked, as an appetiser for more lavish dinners.
- Fish served as appetiser or entrées include pickled herring and gravad laks served cold with bread—rye bread for the herring and white bread for the salmon. There are many kinds of pickled herring, with a large variety of vinegar marinades; smoked or fried pickled herring is also served. Various kinds of fish pâté may be served with bread.

=== Soups ===
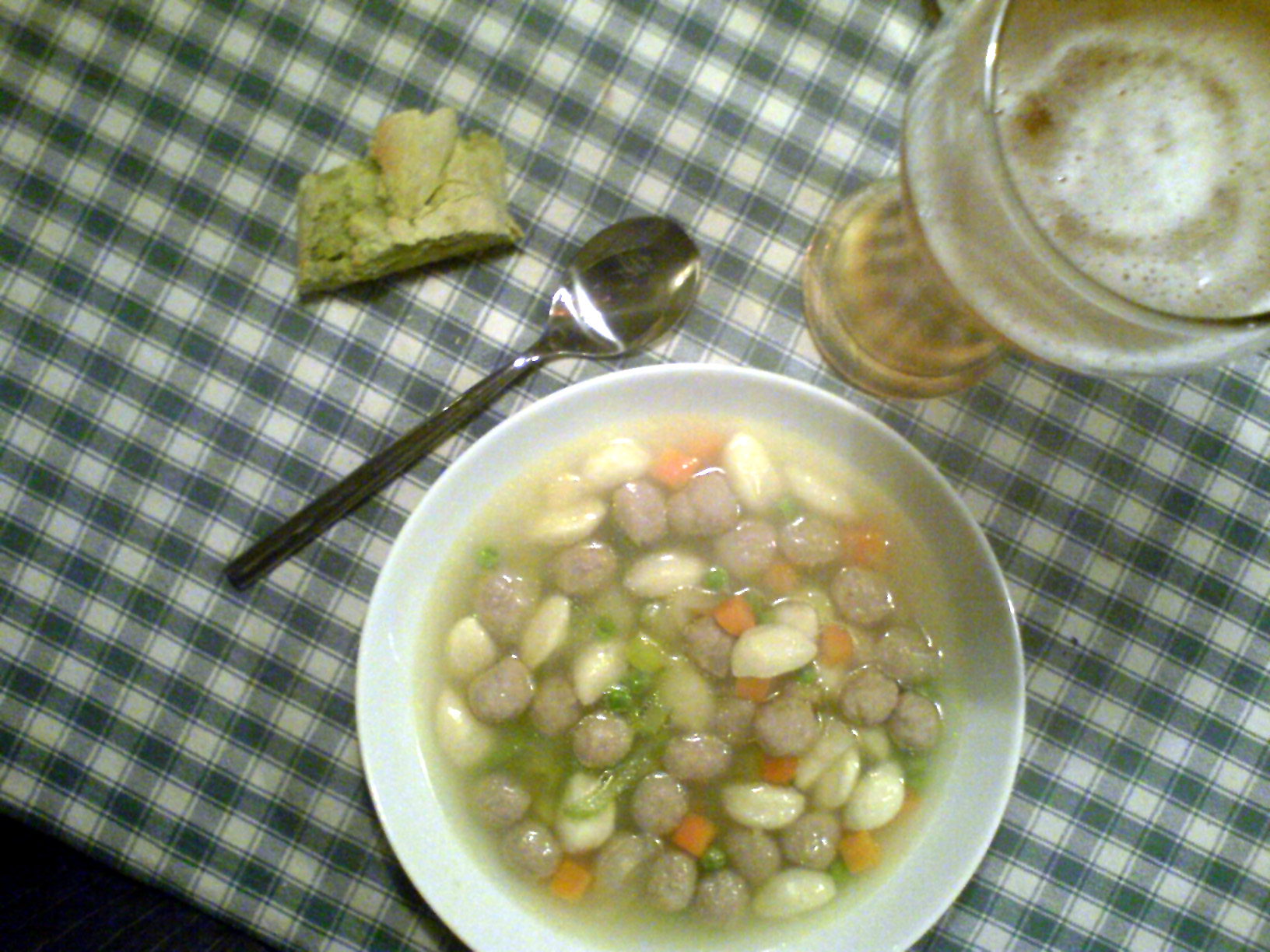
Hønsekødssuppe

Soup is often a meal on its own and mostly served with bread. It can also be served as an entrée before the main course. In addition to soups also common outside of Denmark, specialities include:

- Gule ærter (pea soup), a meal in itself served together with salted pork, carrots and other vegetables
- Hønsekødssuppe (chicken soup) served with melboller (small flour dumplings), meatballs and cubed vegetables.

=== Main dishes ===
Fish, seafood and meat are prominent parts of any traditional Danish dish.

With a very long coastline and large number of smaller islands, Denmark has a long tradition of fishing and seafood takes a natural part of the Danish food tradition.

The most commonly eaten fish and seafood are:

- Cod (torsk), a once common white fish in general food preparation (baked, steamed, poached). It is sometimes also used dried (klipfisk). Danes are particularly fond of cod's roe. The roe is in season in January and February, but is sold and consumed year round canned. Cod has been in steady decline in nature for decades, and hence cod is much more expensive and rarely served nowadays in Denmark. It has mainly been replaced by other similar and more plentiful white fish, such as haddock and ling.
- Norway lobster (jomfruhummer)
- Herring (sild), features prominently in the traditional Danish cuisine and is served in a large variety of ways either smoked, fried, pickled, breaded, or charred.

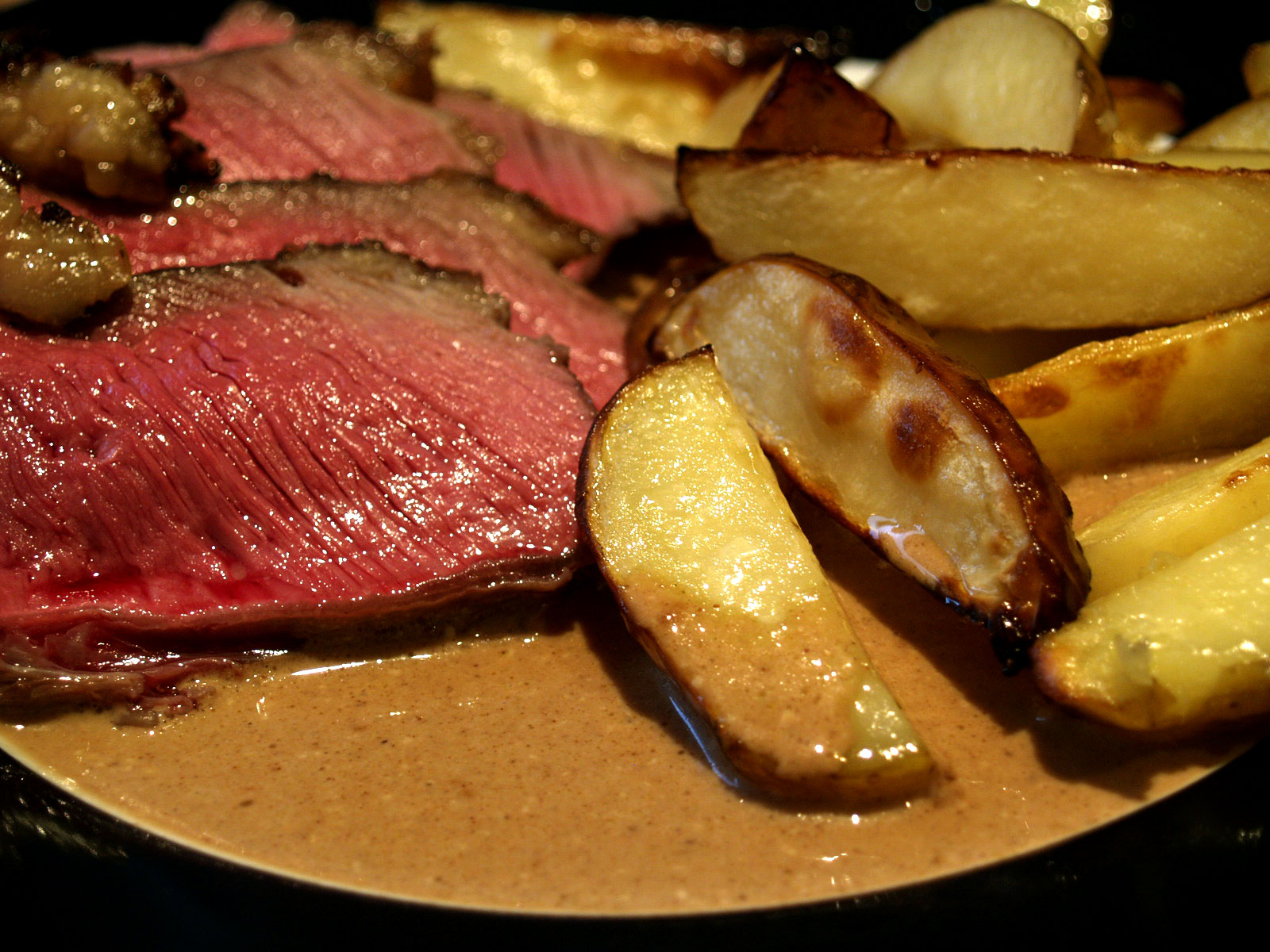
"Culottesteg", top sirloin roast. More expensive meat cuts are usually reserved for weekends or special occasions.

- Plaice (rødspætte), in the form of fried, battered fish filets or as a white fish in general food preparation (baked, steamed, poached). It is often replaced with the more common European flounder, known as skrubbe in Danish.
- Eel (ål), is smoked or pan-fried. Smoked eel is almost exalted in some homes. Once a plentiful and popular fish in Denmark, European Eel is now a highly endangered species for many years, and very expensive.
- Salmon (laks), poached or broiled and served in a variety of ways. Smoked and gravad lox salmon with bread is reserved for appetisers or smørrebrød.
- Roe (rogn), fish roe from cod is by far the most common, and fresh cods roe is typically poached with herbs to be served as is or pan-fried or smoked. Lumpfish roe (stenbiderrogn) is served fresh on occasion and considered a luxury food. Fresh trout or salmon roe is sometimes used for toppings on some seafood dishes, but a particularly popular type of fresh roe for garnishing is seaweed roe, a completely vegetarian type of "roe" developed in Denmark since 1988.

Fish from Bornholm, Iceland and Greenland also has a special place in the Danish cuisine. The island of Bornholm, a part of Denmark located in the Baltic Sea, to the east of Zealand and south of Sweden, is noted for its smoked fish items. Iceland and Greenland have long shared histories with Denmark, and the fish from these North Atlantic lands is a sign of quality.

Pork is the favourite meat in Denmark and pork meat has been a major export sector for more than 100 years. As regards home cooking and meat, the Danes primarily eat pork (42%), followed by poultry (28%) and beef (26%). These are 2016 numbers and does not include processed meat and eating out. Processed meats comprise a lot of pork in Danish cuisine, including hams, smoked pork, many kinds of cold cuts, sausages and salamis, so the pork consumption percentage would be even larger if processed meat were included. Ground pork meat is used in many traditional recipes requiring ground meat. Danish bacon is generally of good quality (exported Danish bacon is of exceptional quality), and available in both the streaky and back varieties.

Beef is also very popular in the modern Danish kitchen. Danish cattle are primarily used for dairy and Denmark has a centuries-old tradition of dairy products. Hence, cattle bred for their meat were formerly rare and expensive. Dairy cattle rarely make good meat cattle – especially after several years as dairy cows- and for that reason, beef has traditionally been ground and cooked as patties or prepared as boiled roast or soup. Today meat-cattle is more common and steaks are popular, especially top sirloin steak of beef (culottesteg) is a classic dish to serve for guests.

Poultry consumption is dominated by chicken, with chicken filet as the most popular choice.

The Danes meat consumption remains high, but meat has overall lost a little bit of ground to vegetables and vegetarian food in the 2010s. Also there is a tendency to replace popular meats with chicken.

==== Traditional main course dishes ====
Many traditional dishes have been abandoned in Denmark in the last 4-5 decades, especially dishes requiring long preparations but also organ meat dishes. Fast preparations, pre-cooked meals and foreign inspired cooking from around the world, has increasingly found its way into the kitchens of the common Danish family. Traditional Danish main course dishes includes:

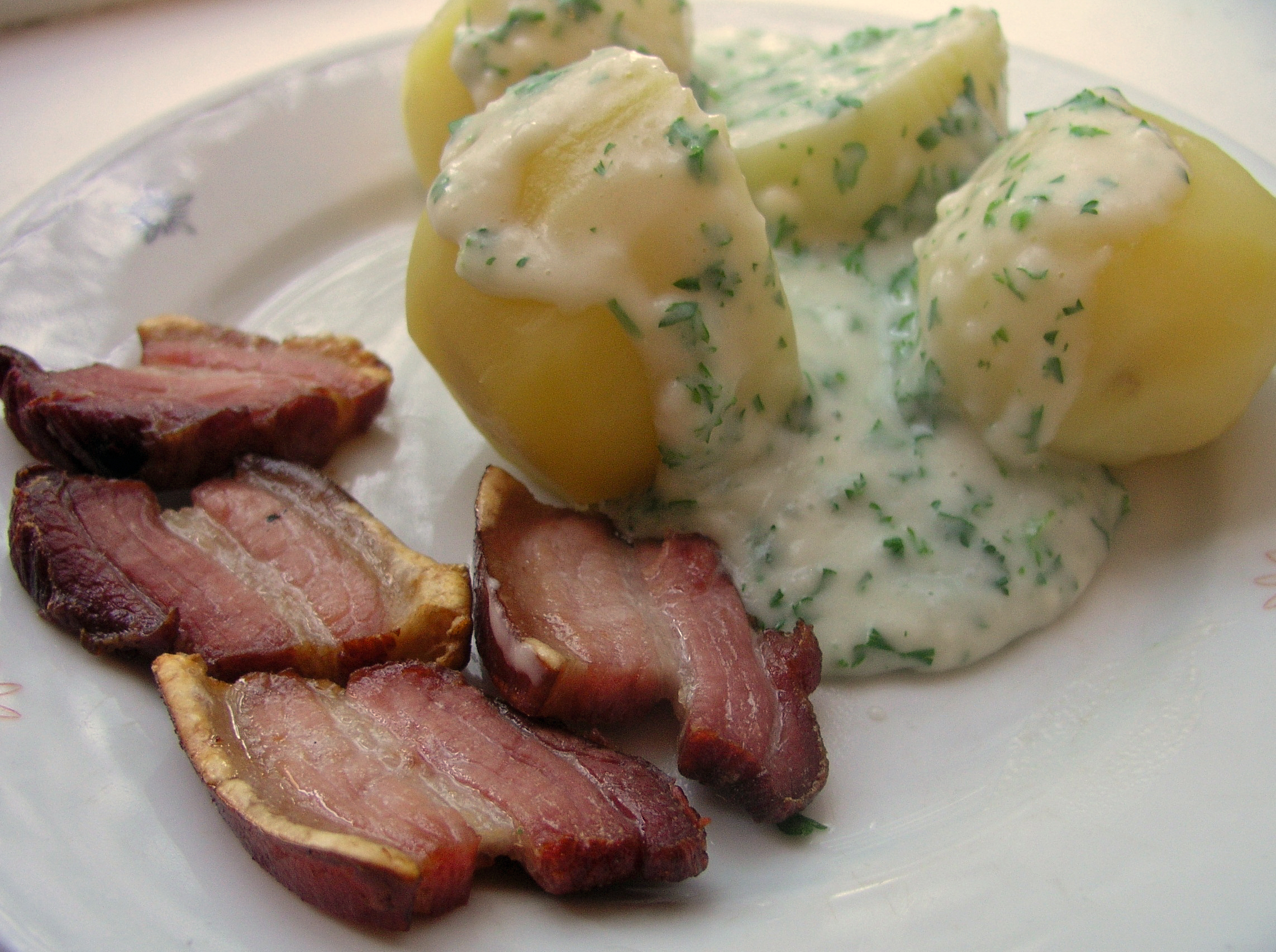
Stegt flæsk med persillesovs, fried, uncured bacon with parsley sauce

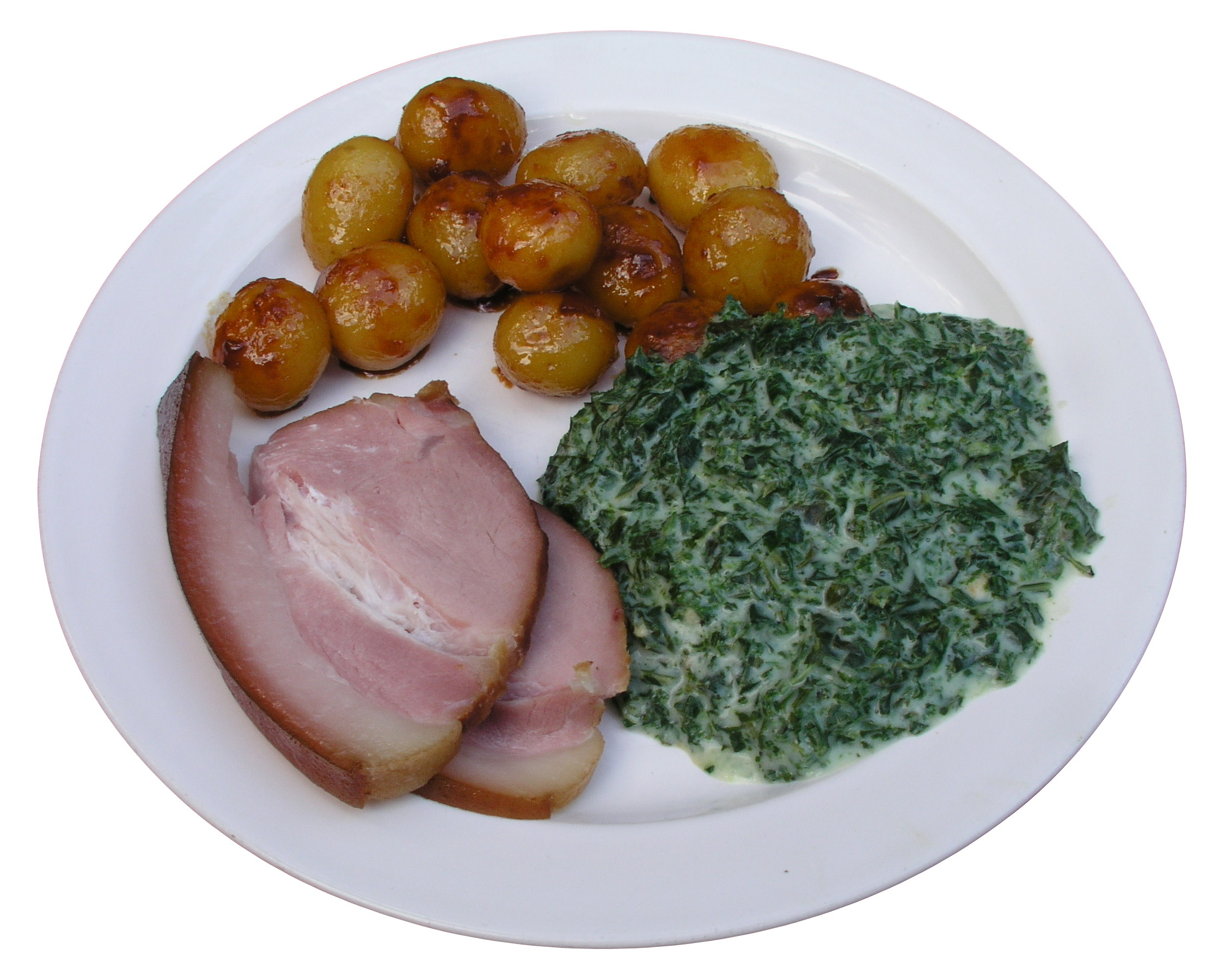
Ham with stewed kale and caramelized potatoes

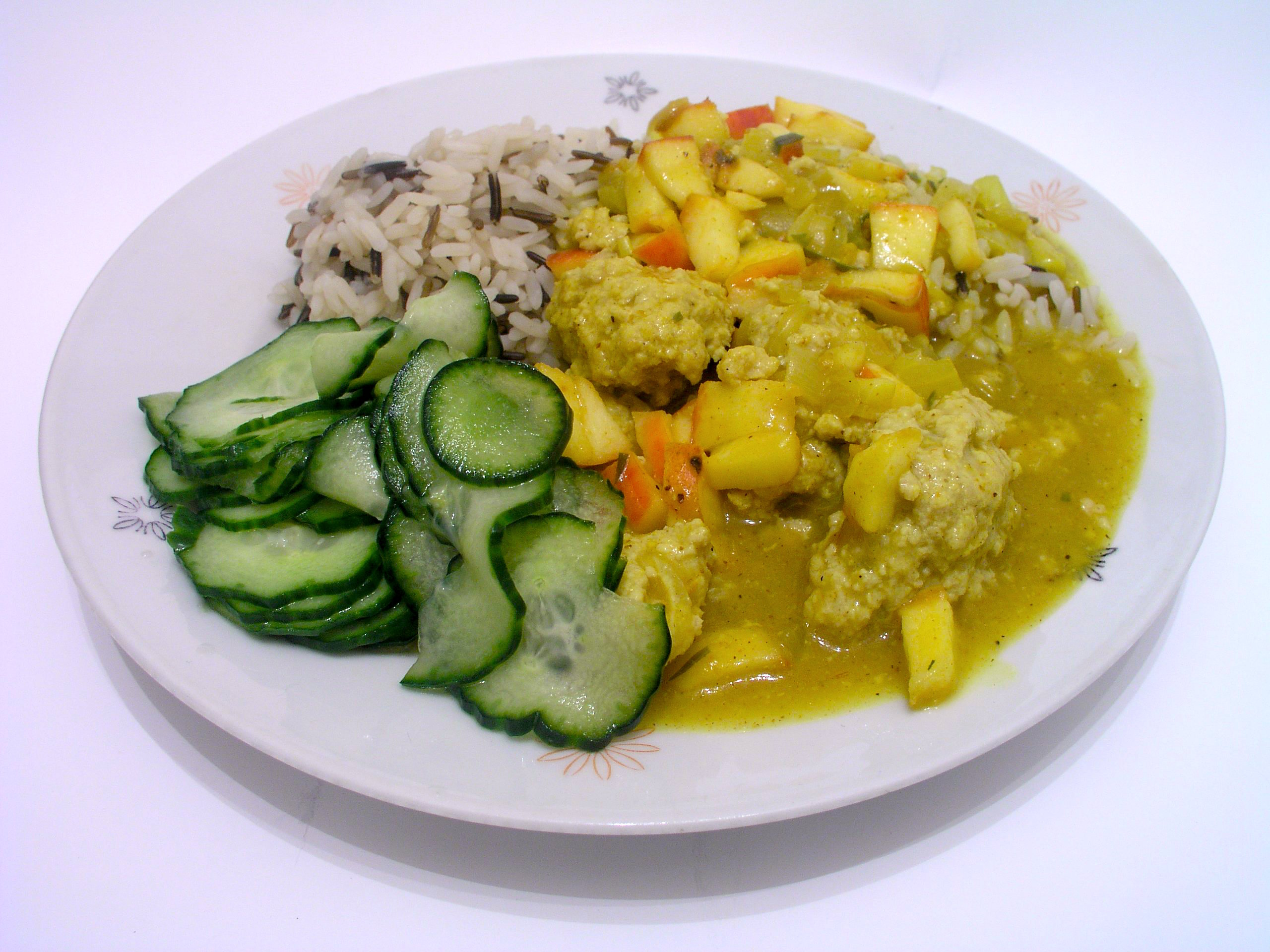
Boller i karry made with apples and celery and served with rice and cucumber pickle

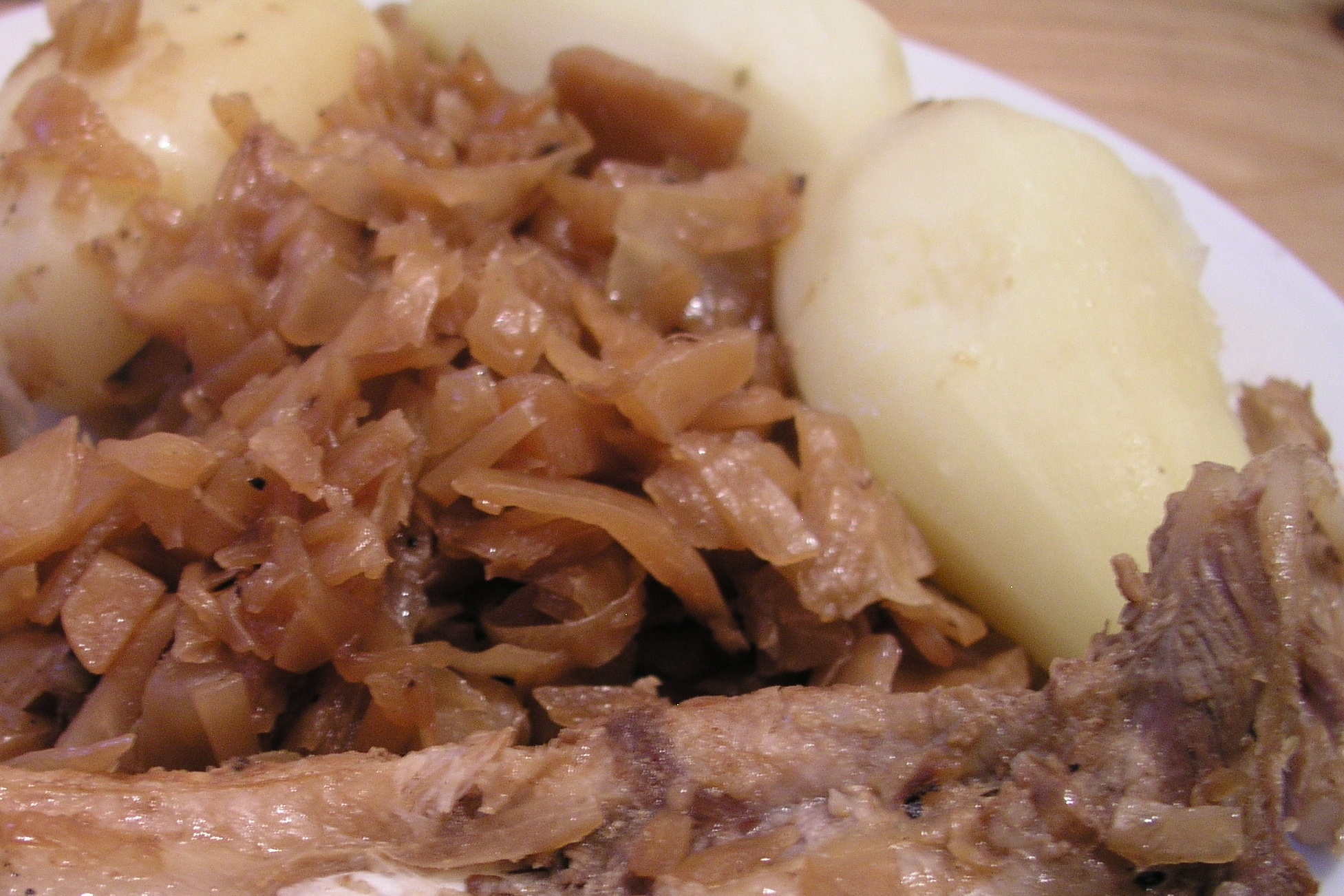
Brunkål med flæsk, browned cabbage with sliced roasted pork meat and boiled potatoes

- Boller i karry (dumplings in curry). Pork meatballs in curry sauce, served with rice.
- Gammeldags kylling (old-fashioned chicken). Pot-roast whole chicken stuffed with parsley and served with boiled potatoes, thick brown sauce, cucumber pickle and rhubarb compote.
- Frikadeller, pan-fried meatballs, either pork or a mix of veal and pork, with spices. There are many variations on the recipe and frikadeller can be served with a variety of accompaniments and vegetable side dishes, hot and cold. Stuvet hvidkål comprising stewed white cabbage in white sauce is a classic.
- Hakkebøf, ground beef steak. Traditionally served with soft caramelized onions (on top), brown sauce, boiled potatoes and pickled beets or cucumbers.
- Hjerter i flødesovs (hearts in cream sauce) Calf's hearts are cleaned and stuffed with parsley and smoked bacon or lard from pork. They are seasoned and fried in a pot with butter and onions. Bouillon and cream is added and they are left to simmer for 1½ hour. The hearts are sliced and served with the sauce, mashed potatoes and surt (a general term for pickled vegetables).
- Stegt lever (fried liver), fried slices of calf's liver served like hakkebøf, but without the pickles. Sometimes accompanied with fried mushrooms and often substituted with pig's liver.
- Stegte sild (fried herrings). Herring has traditionally been a popular fish and there are numerous recipes for fried, pickled or smoked herring served as a main course.
- Æbleflæsk (apple-pork), fried pork slices served with a compote of apple, onion and bacon.
- Stegt flæsk med persillesovs, slices of fried belly pork served with persillesovs (white sauce with chopped parsley) and potatoes. In 2014, voted as the national dish in a vote organised by the Ministry of Environment and Food of Denmark.
- Medisterpølse, thick, spiced, minced pork sausage, fried and served in a variety of ways. Rødkål (see below), rye bread and mustard are classic accompaniments.
- Gule Ærter (Yellow peas), a thick and hearty soup of yellow split peas, cooked and served with pork. Served with ryebread and mustard and sometimes medisterpølse and potatoes. In some families and in some regions Gule Ærter is enjoyed at specific events, traditions or at larger gatherings.
- Hønsekødssuppe (Hens-meat-soup). A strong soup boiled on a large hen with herbs and vegetables like carrots, celeriac, onions and leeks. The meat is usually reserved for other dishes like Høns i Asparges, Høns i peberrod or chicken salad for smørrebrød, and the soup is then served on its own with meatballs of pork (kødboller), small white dumplings of flour and milk (melboller), and a few of the vegetables.
- Høns i Asparges (Hens in Asparagus) Boiled hens meat (traditionally from Hønsekødssuppe) is cooked with a little chicken soup, a bit of flour and some chopped white asparagus. Sometimes chopped champignons are added. The dish is thickened and flavoured with cream and egg yolks and served with boiled potatoes and a drizzle of parsley.
- Tarteletter (Tartlets). Small bowls of crusty pastry. They can be filled with a variety of ingredients, but tradition calls for Høns i Asparges.
- Æggekage (Egg-cake) -- similar to an omelette. Traditionally served in the pan with fried bacon, sliced tomatoes, copious amounts of chopped chives and buttered rye bread. Smoked herring is sometimes offered on the side.
- Påskelam (Easter-lamb) grilled lamb with dry herbs and garlic.
- Culottesteg, top sirloin roast beef with dry herbs served with potatoes and green salad or gravy.
- Stegt gås, roast goose is sometimes served for Christmas.
- Stegt and, roast duck prepared like roast goose, stuffed with apples, prunes and thyme. Most popular Christmas dish in Denmark, often accompanied with flæskesteg and almost always with rødkål. Also served on Morten's aften (St. Martin's Day, November 11), where it has replaced an older tradition of roast goose.
- Flæskesteg, roast pork with crackling, often served at Christmas.
- Rødkål, sliced and stewed red cabbage. Recipes has a large variety, but almost always include vinegar, sugar and some spice, with cinnamon, bay leaves and cloves as common choices, while other recipes adds allspice or cardamom as well. Apples, onions, and sometimes oranges or red wine might be added, and for more luxurious versions, the cabbage is stewed with duck grease. Served for Christmas, but not exclusively. Rødkål is a traditional accompaniment to flæskesteg, medister, frikadeller, stegt and, and stegt gås.
- Brunede kartofler (Browned potatoes), boiled potatoes caramelized with sugar and butter. Mostly served for Christmas, accompanying the roast duck, goose or pork.
- Øllebrød (Beer-bread), a porridge made of rye bread, sugar and beer. Formerly served unsweetened accompanying main courses like fried herring, but now almost exclusively served for breakfast with cold milk or whipped cream. Lemon or orange zest is sometimes added for spice.
- Millionbøf, (Million-steak), fried ground beef (a million tiny steaks) with gravy. Usually served over pasta or mashed potatoes.
- Brændende kærlighed (Burning love), mashed potatoes made with butter and milk or cream. A well is made in the top of the mashed potatoes and filled with a mix of fried diced bacon and onions.
- Risengrød, (Rice-porridge), a dish that has a special relationship to Christmas. It is traditionally the favorite dish of the Nisse. Usually served with butter, cinnamon sugar and nisseøl. It is also the basis of the Danish Christmas dessert Risalamande.

=== Desserts ===
Desserts from the traditional Danish cuisine that are still popular, includes:

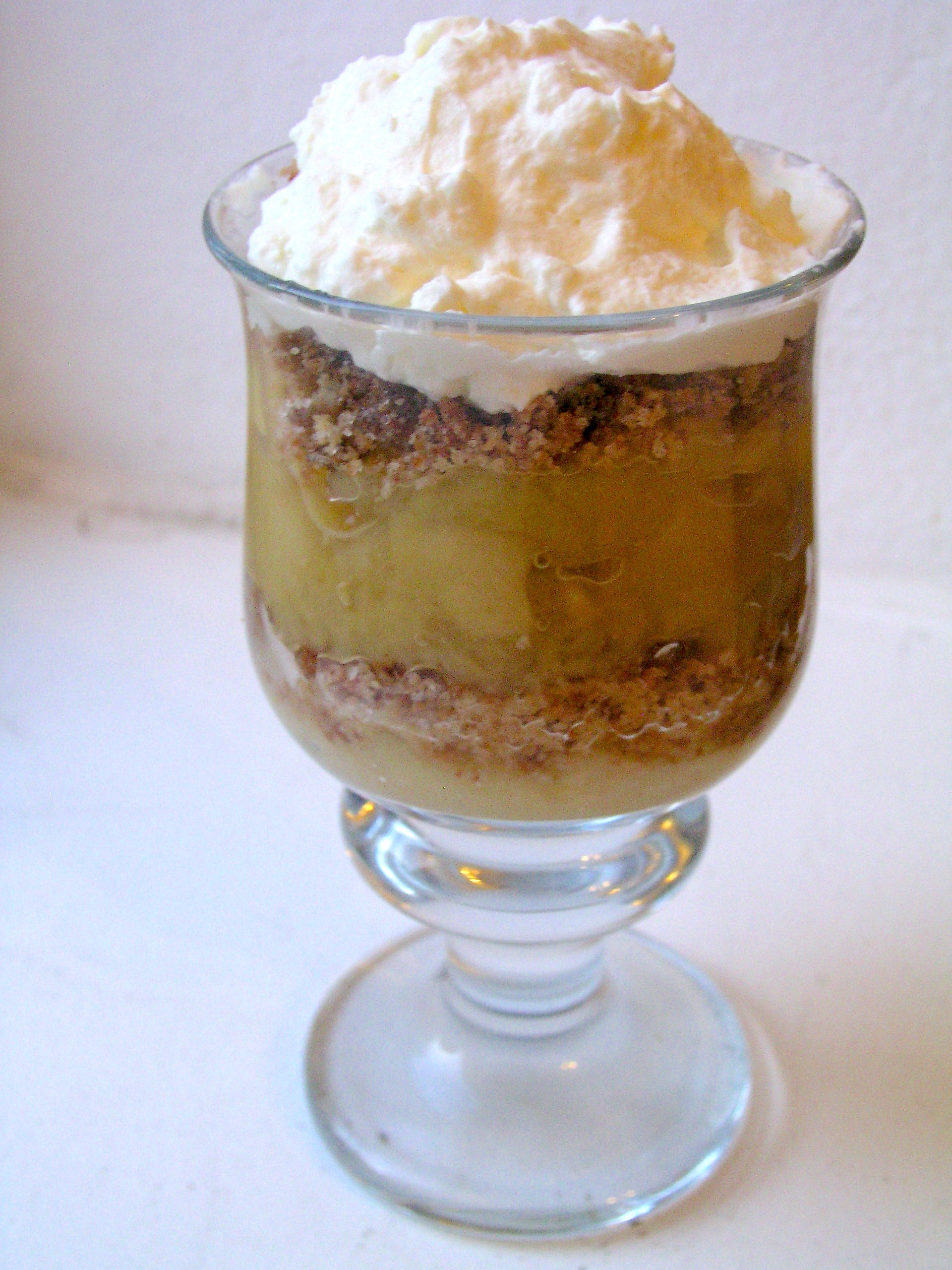
"Æblekage", a cold apple charlotte.

- Æblekage, (apple charlotte). Stewed sweetened apples layered with butter-roasted bread crumbs and crushed makroner (an almond-flavoured meringue), topped with whipped cream and sometimes redcurrant jelly. Served cold.
- Citronfromage (lemon custard). A very thick lemon flavoured custard made with both gelatin and beaten egg whites with sugar (see Meringue). Served cold with whipped cream. Flavouring with rum instead of lemon, is a traditional variation known as Romfromage.
- Karamelrand (lit.: Caramel-ridge). A cream and egg based custard flavoured with caramel and shaped like a ring. Served cold with a caramel sauce. A traditional variation is Fløderand, which is flavoured with vanilla and served with pickled fruit, instead of the caramel.
- Frugtsalat. Fruit salad topped with vanilla cream or whipped cream and grated chocolate. This is a more recent addition to the Danish cuisine and tropical or foreign fruits like banana, grapes, orange or pineapple are standard ingredients. Also known as abemad (monkey food).
- Rødgrød med fløde, stewed, thickened red berry compote (usually a mix of strawberries, rhubarb, raspberry) served with cream or as topping on ice cream.
- Pandekager, a thin, crepe-like pancake, often sprinkled with confectioner's sugar, rolled up, and served with strawberry jam or vanilla ice cream. Since 2006, Shrove Tuesday has been celebrated as Pancake Day in Denmark.
- Koldskål. A sweet cold buttermilk dish with vanilla and lemon, often served in the summer. (Can also be eaten as dinner)
- Danish strawberries with cream and sugar, served in the summer when in season.
- Risalamande (or ris à l'amande), a cold rice pudding mixed with whipped cream, sugar, vanilla beans and chopped almonds, served cold with hot or cold cherry-sauce. Almost exclusively served on festive events related to Christmas and commonly eaten on Christmas Eve in particular.

=== Cakes ===
Cakes are usually not served for dessert in Denmark, but as an occasional sweet treat in between meals or at celebrations and particular festive events. Coffee or tea is usually offered with cakes.

=== Sweets ===
Salted liquorice is popular in Denmark and the Netherlands. Chocolate-coated marshmallow treats originate from Denmark. Also first produced in Denmark the company Castus produces slices of fig/date to put on rye bread. Other fruit slices are also produced.

== Traditional feasts ==
Danish culture has a number of annual recurring traditional feasts. Most of them are rooted in both the Norse pagan tradition and the Christian culture, including the most widely celebrated feast of Christmas, known as Jul in Denmark. Christmas and Easter are the most prominent feasts in Danish culture, both in terms of religious and traditional importance but also food wise. A number of smaller feasts such as Fastelavn (Carnival), Pinse (Pentecost) and Mortensaften (St. Martin's Day), are also of some importance regarding food while other traditional celebrations such as Grundlovsdag, May Day and Sankthans (St. John's Eve) are not coupled to the Danish food culture in any special way.

The celebration of New Year's Eve is perhaps on par with both Christmas and Easter in modern times and is also coupled with some strong food traditions. Poached cod served with mustard sauce, boiled potatoes and horseradish is traditionally enjoyed as the main course on this evening, known as nytårstorsk (New Year's Cod), with champagne and kransekage served later in the night. Slices of boiled ham served with stewed kale is another traditional dish for this particular evening. In recent decades, the traditional menus has given way to contemporary gourmet servings in many places, even though the champagne and the kransekage remains very popular.

=== Christmas ===
There are some regional variations of the traditional Christmas cuisine within Denmark, but it is generally the same across the country. It includes a lot of spices, in particular cinnamon, cloves and cardamom.

==== Christmas lunch ====
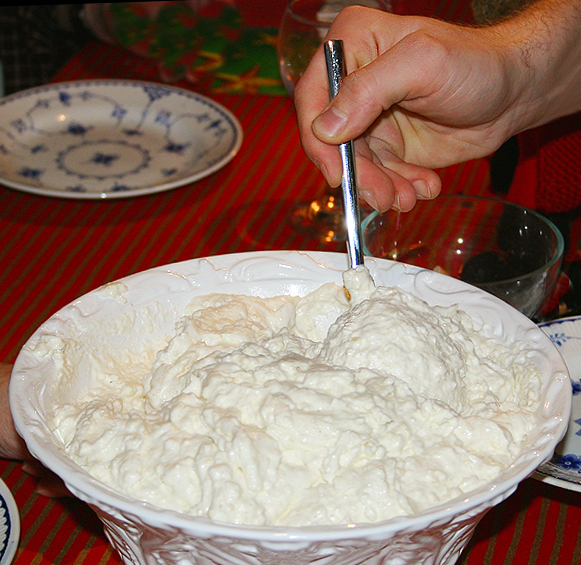
"Risalamande", a vanilla flavored rice pudding with almonds for Christmas

Julefrokost, or Christmas lunch, is a variation on Det Kolde Bord buffet, celebrated on various occasions throughout the whole Christmas month of December. Most communities, workplaces, organisations and associations set aside time for an annual gathering and julefrokost on a non-specific Friday or Saturday. This includes coworkers, club members and all kinds of organizations and the festivities often include music and dancing, and usually continues into the early hours of the morning with plentiful drinking. In addition to these public gatherings, there is also tradition for a special family event julefrokost, but this is celebrated in the home on Christmas Day or shortly after.

Apart from the standard food items for a Danish cold buffet, Christmas lunch julefrokost traditionally also includes some specialities, such as sylte (pork meat jelly), fried blodpølse, and Risalamande. Blodpølse is a sweetened and spiced blood sausage with raisins, but it has decreased a lot in popularity since the 19th century. Risalamande is a rice pudding served with hot or cold cherry sauce and it is very popular. The pudding consists mainly of sweetened and cooled rice porridge mixed with whipped cream, vanilla and chopped almonds. A popular and traditional game is to put a whole, peeled almond in the common bowl of pudding. The lucky person to find it in his or her serving wins a prize, which in popular traditions would be a pig shaped of marzipan.

Juleøl Christmas beer brews and herb infused akvavit spirit is commonly paired with the julefrokost. All over Denmark, trains and buses run all night during the julefrokost season and the police are on a special lookout for drunk drivers to avoid alcohol related accidents.

A special part of not only the julefrokost lunch but of many festive, celebratory meals is the selskabssang (party song). It is a tradition unique to Denmark, and includes event-specific sing-along songs to traditional tunes, but with lyrics specifically written for the occasion.

==== Christmas dinner at home ====
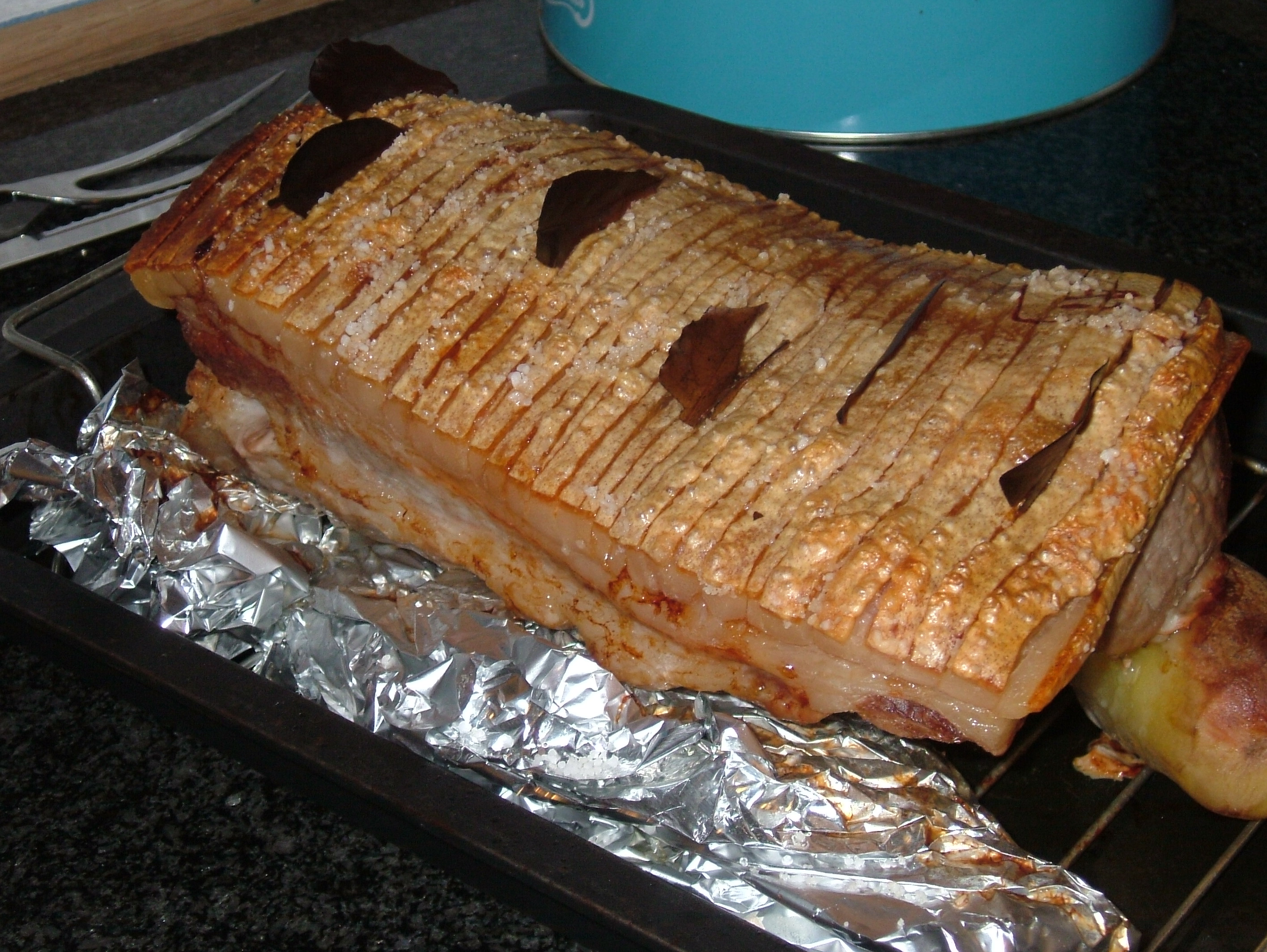
"Flæskesteg", roast pork with crackling

In Denmark, the Christmas dinner is served on the evening of 24 December (Christmas Eve). It takes the form of a main dish (usually pork, goose or duck) and the Risalamande dessert. The traditional recipes from Frk. Jensen's 1901 cook book (see below) still form the basis of Christmas cooking today.

Flæskesteg, a pork roast cut from the breast or neck and with the skin left on, is prepared by cutting the skin through to the meat layer sideways and rubbing it thoroughly with coarse salt flakes and sometimes spices to produce crispy cracklings. Slices of roasted flæskesteg is served with brown gravy and accompanied by both boiled potatoes and caramelized potatoes (brunede kartofler) specially prepared in a frying pan with melted sugar and a lump of butter. Sour-sweet spiced red cabbage is always included too and is widely available in jars and cans.

Goose and duck are filled with a stuffing of apple boats and prunes before they are roasted in a hot oven. The bird is served with a brown sauce based on the broth obtained by boiling the heart, neck, liver and gizzard, thickened with a little fat from the bird, flour and sour cream. Gravy browning may be added. Just like the pork, the bird is served with two kinds of potatoes and red cabbage.

=== Easter ===
==== Holy Saturday lunch ====
Holy Saturday the traditional dish served for lunch is Skidne æg (Dirty eggs), the name referres to fact that the homes were usually dirty on Holy Saturday, as no work and no cleaning or laundry would be done on the two holidays: Maundy Thursday and Good Friday. Skidne æg is medium boiled eggs, served with mustard sauce, cress and ryebread.

==== Easter Sunday lunch ====
Families gather for lunch on Easter Sunday. The lunch will typically consist three courses, starting with "det kolde bord" with pickled herring, prawns, hard-boiled eggs, tuna, liverpaté and various cold cuts. Strong Easter Brew beer and snaps is usually served. The second dish is a warm dish, that according to tradition should contain either lamb, eggs or chicken. The third dish is cheeses with grapes, red peppers and crackers.

== Restaurants and dining venues ==
Eating out in restaurants can be a costly affair, with the average price running higher than that of the European average. As a result of the New Nordic Cuisine trend, Danish restaurants are now firmly on the international gourmet map. In the big cities, and in shopping districts, there are many more reasonably priced eating places, including chain fast food options of various kinds.

=== Restaurants ===
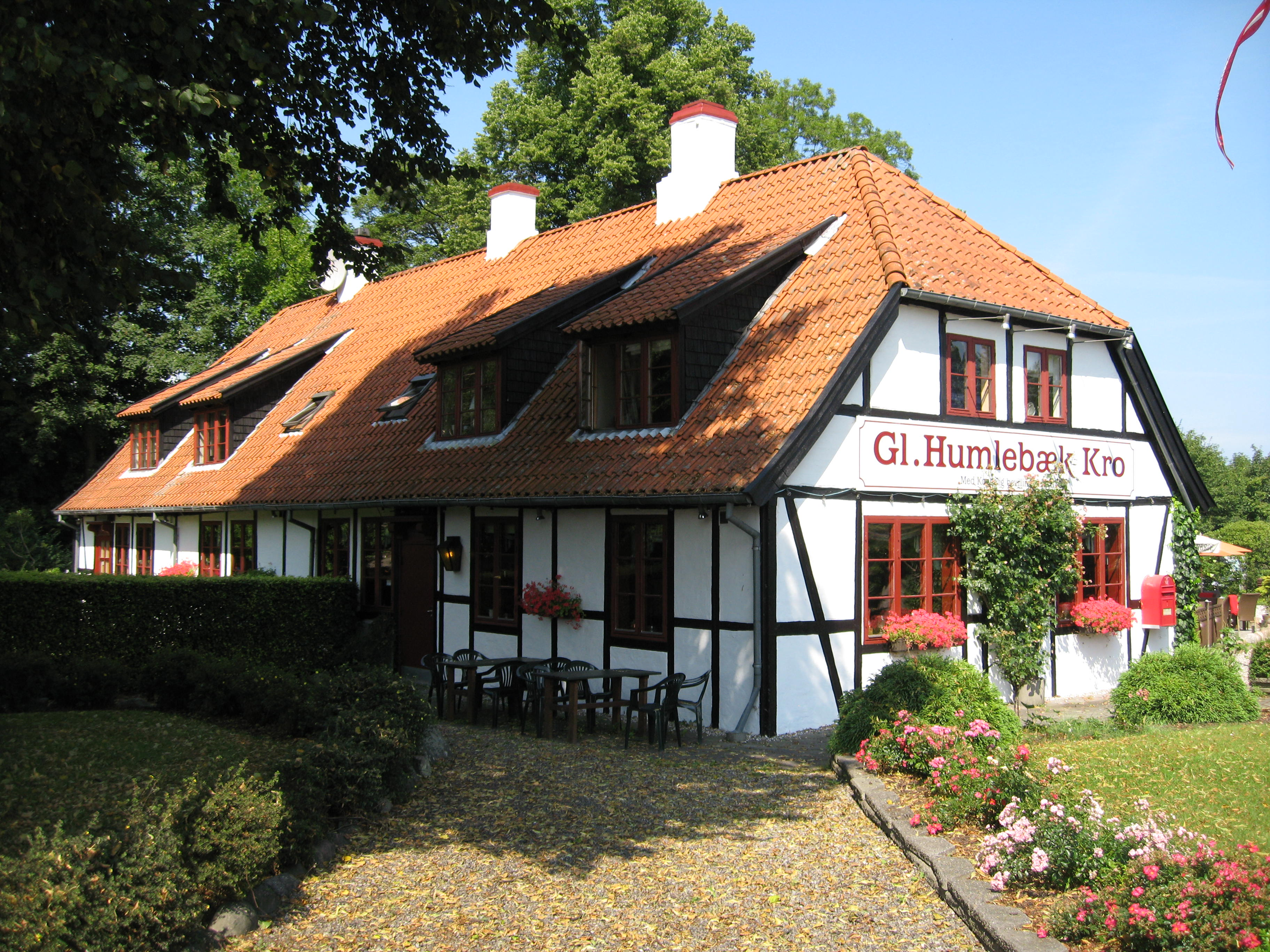
Many old inns in the countryside serve traditional dishes.

Denmark has many fine dining restaurants, not only in the larger cities, but also in the countryside. The kro (roughly equivalent to an inn, but held in higher social regard) provides lodging as well as meals and drinks. Especially the royally privileged lodges have a long and interesting history. Danish cuisine continues to evolve and keep up with the times. It has become more health-conscious, and has drawn inspiration not only from the traditional French and Italian kitchens, but also from many other more exotic gastronomical sources. Increasingly, restaurants are turning to trends based on a combination of continental cooking and the growing interest in products from the local environment served in accordance with seasonal availability.

=== Cafés ===
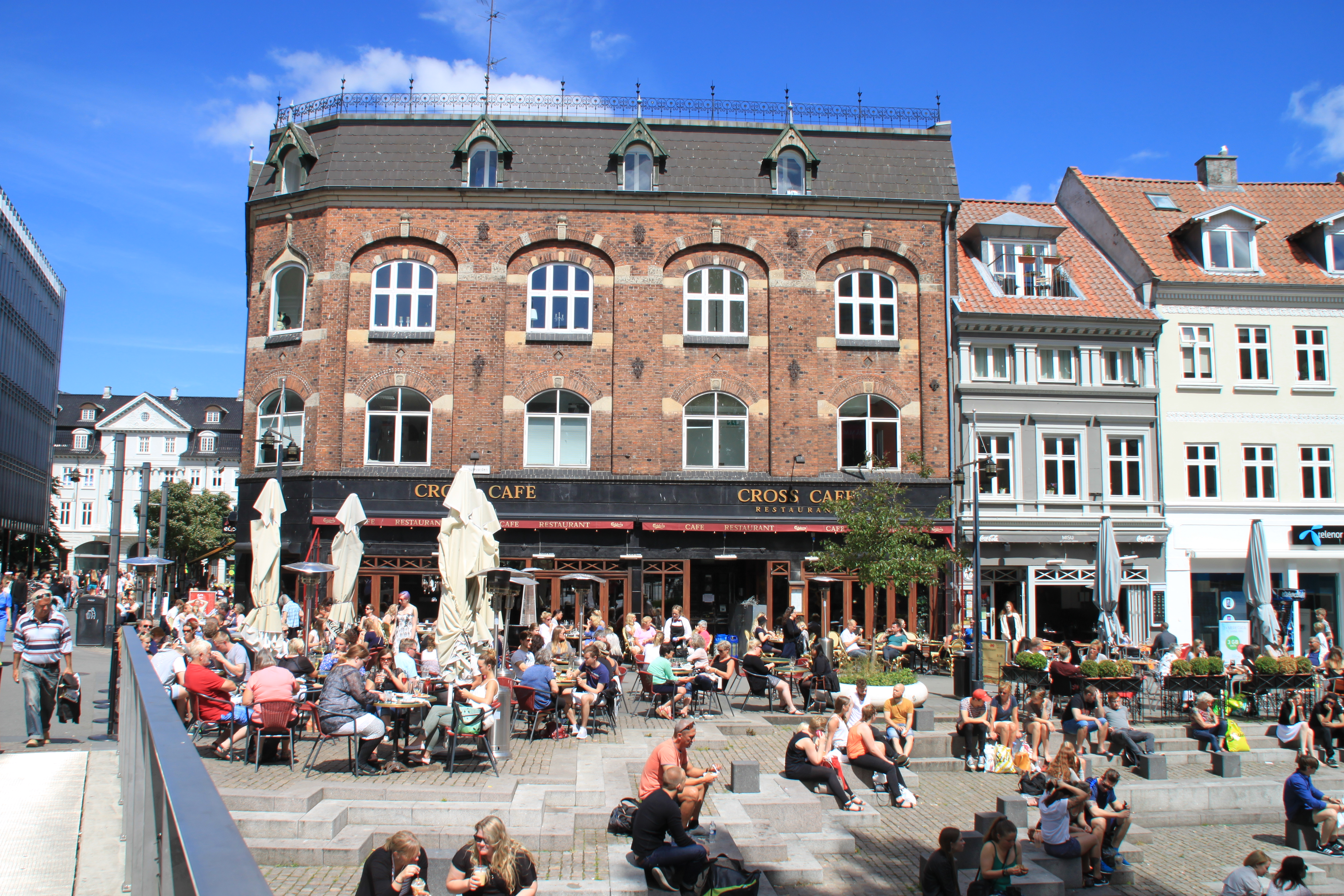
Cafés are popular for light meals and some cafés serves as restaurants.

Another reasonable place to eat is at a café. These are plentiful, especially in the bigger cities, and usually offer soups, sandwiches, salads, cakes, pastries, and other light foods, in addition to the expected coffee, tea, beer and other beverages. Quite a few cafés serve breakfast and brunch, and some double as evening restaurants.

Most cafés in Denmark are unique, but chains are increasingly popular. The Danish coffee-bar chain of Baresso Coffee, founded in 1999, mainly serves coffee and tea related products and is present with many cafés in most larger towns across Denmark, but also in the Faroe Islands as well as Copenhagen Airport and MS Crown of Scandinavia. International café chains has gained ground in the capital of Copenhagen, currently including two Starbucks and several Caffè Ritazza (UK), at the Copenhagen Airport, Magasin Torv by the Magasin Du Nord department store, and at Copenhagen Central Station.

=== Street and fast food ===
Street food has made an enormous impact on the way Danes eat in the 2010s, but street food has been part of Danish dining culture for many years.

The most common quick food restaurant is the "burger bar" or "grill bar", offering hamburgers, hot dogs and a wide variety of other fast food staples. Pizzerias are equally popular and can be found in every town in the country, large or small. Other commonly found fast foods include Turkish and Middle East food specialties such as falafel, shish-kebab and spit-roasted meat (most often shawarma) with salad in pita bread, or wrapped in durum wheat based flatbread. International chains Burger King, McDonald's, and Sunset Boulevard has been around since 1977, 1981, and 1996 respectively, and can be found in most cities.

==== Hot dog vans ====
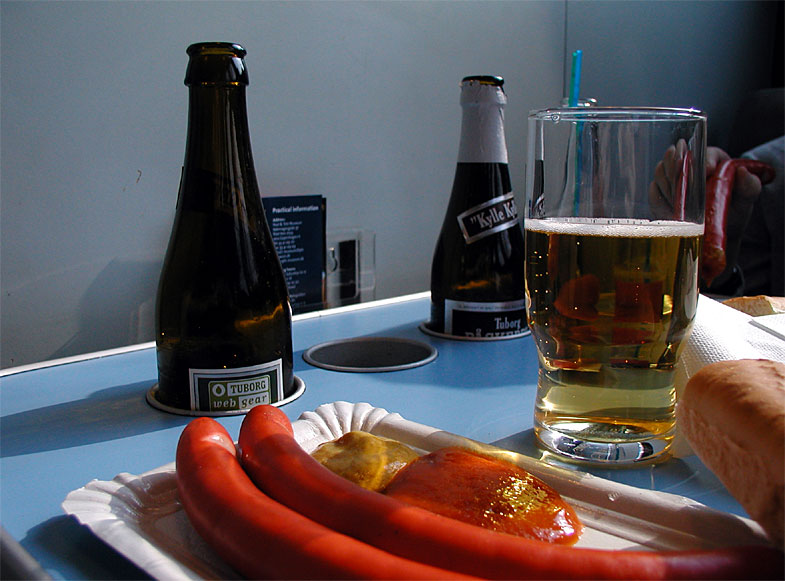
Red sausages (røde pølser)

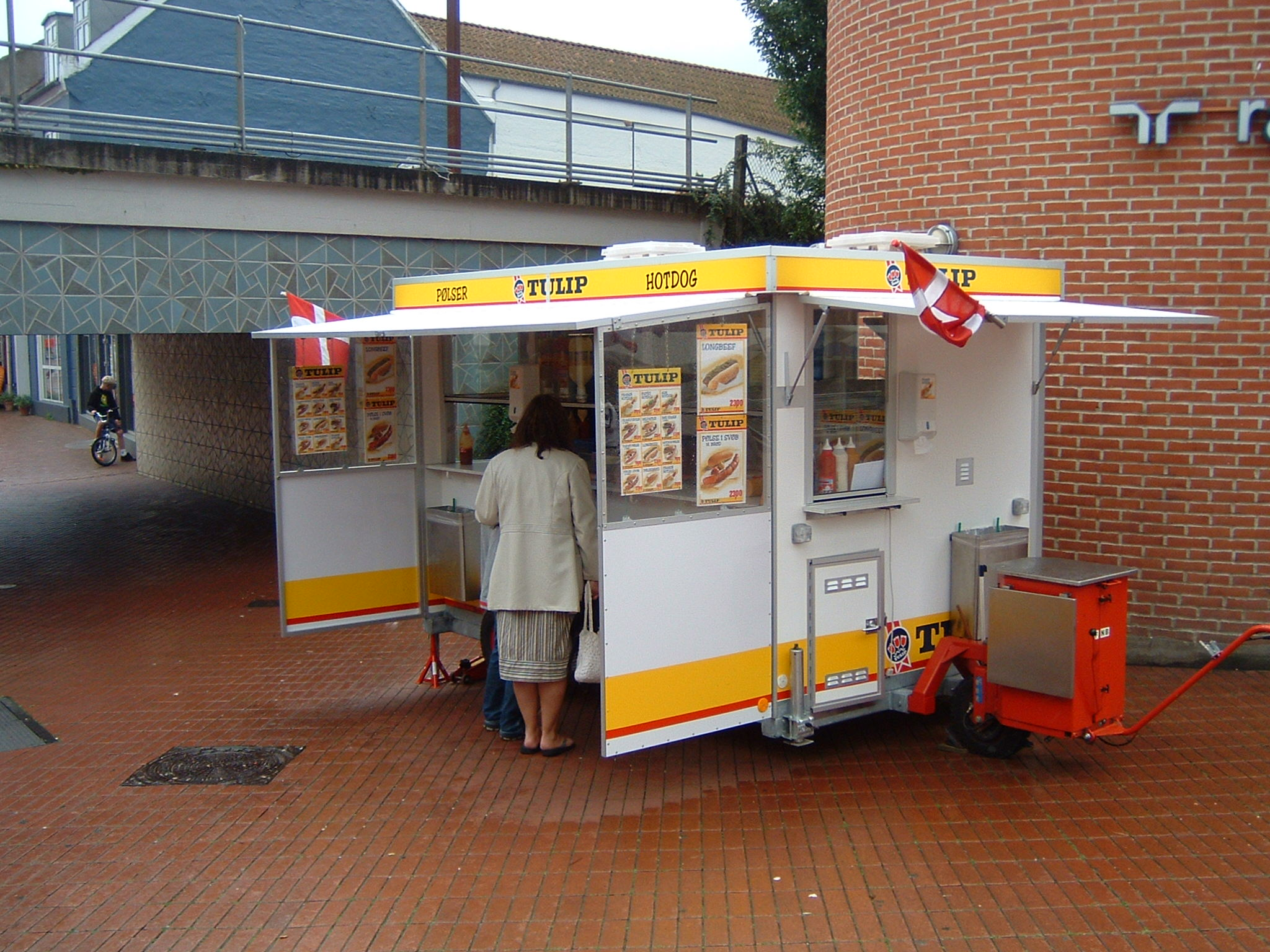
A pølsevogn in the city center of Kolding (Jutland)

The pølsevogn (lit. sausage wagon) food truck is a well-established common fast food option and the "original" street food outlet in Denmark. They serve a variety of pork sausages, including Denmark's renowned red sausages, røde pølser. These hot dog-like sausages of the Vienna type are about 20 cm long, about the diameter of an index finger and stuffed in brightly coloured red skin. Røde pølser are traditionally served on a small, rectangular paper plate with a bread (similar to a hot dog bun, but without a slice in it) on the side, and a squirt of both ketchup, Danish remoulade sauce and mustard. Danish remoulade is somewhat similar to American relish and the mustard served with sausages is hot and unsweetened. The bread and sausage is eaten alternately, dipped into the condiments. Typical and classic sausages served from a pølsevogn also includes, thick and juicy knækpølser (both red and uncoloured), long thick and grilled frankfurtere, hearty grilled medisterpølse, large grilled kryddersvend sausages spiced with curry, and pølse i svøb (sausage in a wrap) which are a sausage wrapped in and grilled with bacon.

When the sausage is served in a traditional hot dog bun, it is called a "hot dog". It is commonly served with Danish remoulade, ketchup, mustard, onion (both raw and toasted, i.e. ristede) and thinly sliced pickles on top. The ristede løg fried onions are similar in taste to French-fried onion rings. The pickled condiment varies from region to region, and includes rødkål red cabbage in some places, but cucumber relish is the most widespread. Another variety is the French hot dog (Fransk hotdog) which is a sausage stuffed into a special long baguette-like bread roll. The roll has a hole in one end, and after the requested condiment has been squirted in (ketchup, mustard, different kinds of dressing), a sausage is slipped through. The simplest sausage wagons are portable and very temporary. They are typically a metal wagon with an open window to the street, and a counter where customers can stand and eat their sausages. More advanced wagons includes limited seating, usually both inside and outside. Through the years the number of sausage wagons has dropped as competition from convenience stores, gas stations, kebab and pizza-places has increased.

==== Social dining ====
Food courts emerged on the Copenhagen dining scene in 2011 and quickly became very popular, inspiring similar initiatives in Aarhus from 2015. Parallel with the stationary and sheltered food courts, mobile food trucks appeared, selling a wide variety of meals at events and random popular spots. This new development is part of a broader popular movement of social dining across the country, with a multitude of local food, dining and cooking clubs, purchasing societies and urban farming projects sprouting among citizens in larger cities.

== Other popular foods ==
=== Potatoes ===
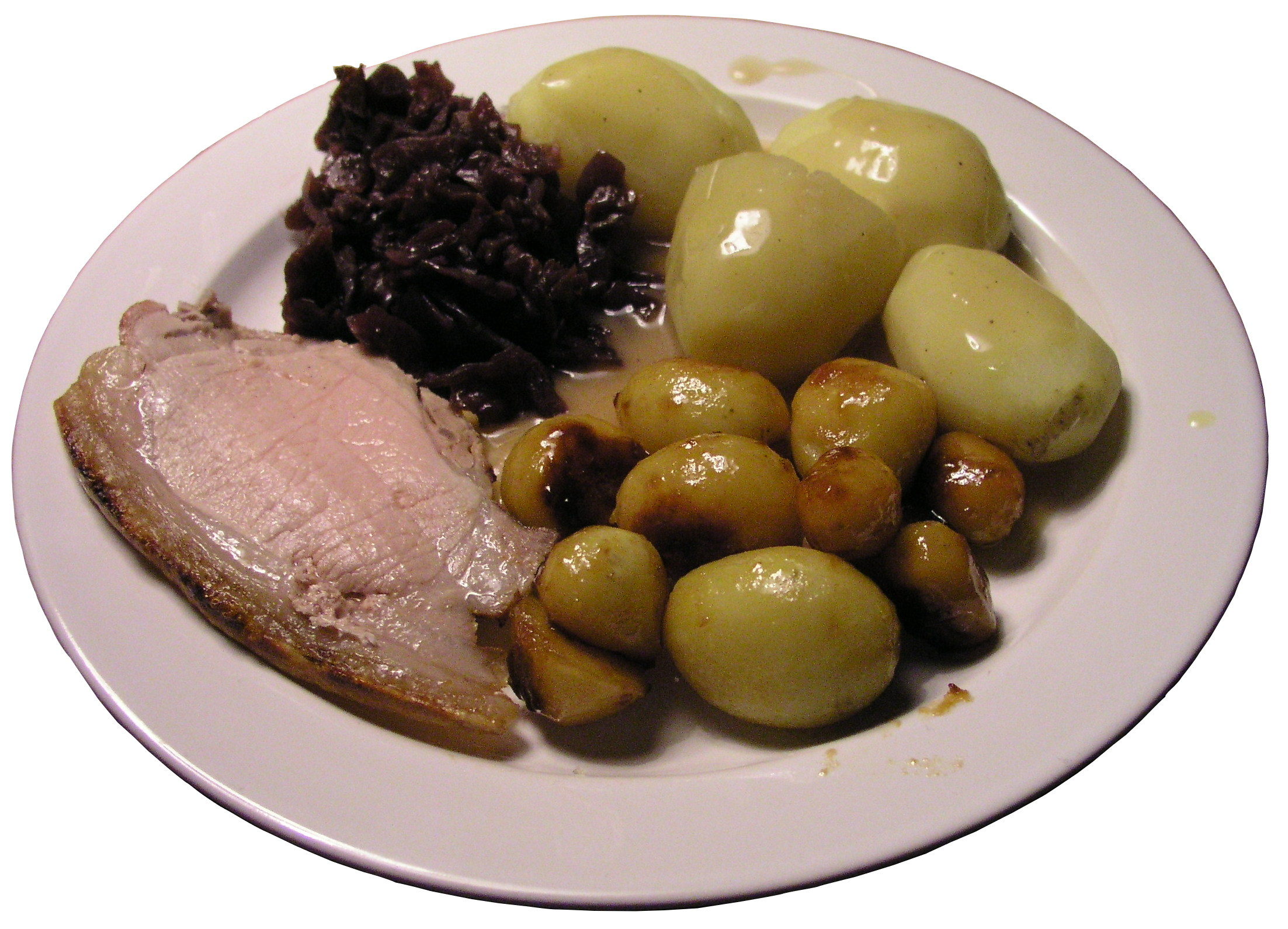
Roast pork served with both white and caramelized potatoes (brunede kartofler)

Potato recipes are ubiquitous in Danish cooking. The potato was first introduced into Denmark by French immigrant Huguenots in Fredericia in 1720. The potato is considered an essential side dish to every hot meal.

Especially prized are the season's early potatoes, such as those from Samsø.

Some favorites:

- Au gratin potatoes
- Baked potatoes with crème fraiche
- Boiled new potatoes with herbs
- Potato wedges au natural or baked with beetroots and carrots marinated in olive oil, garlic and dry herbs
- Boiled potatoes smothered in butter with fresh dill or chives
- Caramelized browned potatoes (brunede kartofler). Usually an accessory to the Christmas meal, roast goose, duck or pork
- Cold sliced potatoes arranged on buttered rye bread and decorated with mayonnaise and chives
- Mashed potatoes covered with a meat stew
- Pommes frites (French fries)
- Potato salad (kartoffelsalat)
- Potato and parsley broth

=== Vegetables and salads ===
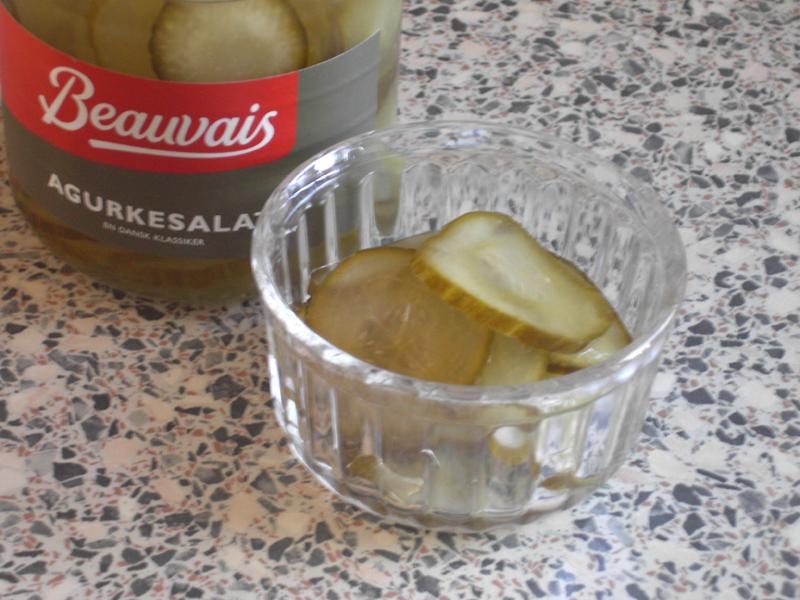
Agurkesalat: pickled cucumber salad

Although the potato is the central vegetable in traditional Danish cooking, it is by no means the only vegetable associated with Danish cuisine. Those other vegetables that play an important role often had to be preserved for long periods of time in cold rooms, or were pickled or marinated for storage. Cauliflower, carrots and a variety of cabbages were often a part of the daily meal, especially when in season, in the days prior to widespread refrigeration.

- Beans (bønner)
- Peas (ærter) Especially popular when freshly picked.
- Brussels sprouts (rosenkål)
- Cabbage (kål)
- Carrots (gulerødder)
- Creamed kale (grønlangkål), spinach or white cabbage
- Cauliflower (blomkål)
- Cucumber salad (agurkesalat)
- Italian salad (italiensk salat), a mixture of vegetables in a mayonnaise dressing, served on ham and other cold cuts. The name comes from the red-white-green coloring, the colors of the Italian flag. The salad's colouring originates from carrots, mayonnaise and asparagus, and green peas.
- Onion (løg)
- Pickled red beet slices (rødbeder)
- Pickles, a mixture of pickled vegetables in a yellow gelatinous sauce, served with corned beef
- Russian salad (russisk salat), a red beet salad (not to be confused with Olivier salad, which is also known as Russian salad).
- Sweet and sour red cabbage (rødkål). Sautéed red cabbage, boiled with red currant juice, apples and vinegar. Additional sugar may be added, and sometimes cinnamon or cloves.

=== Sauces and condiments ===
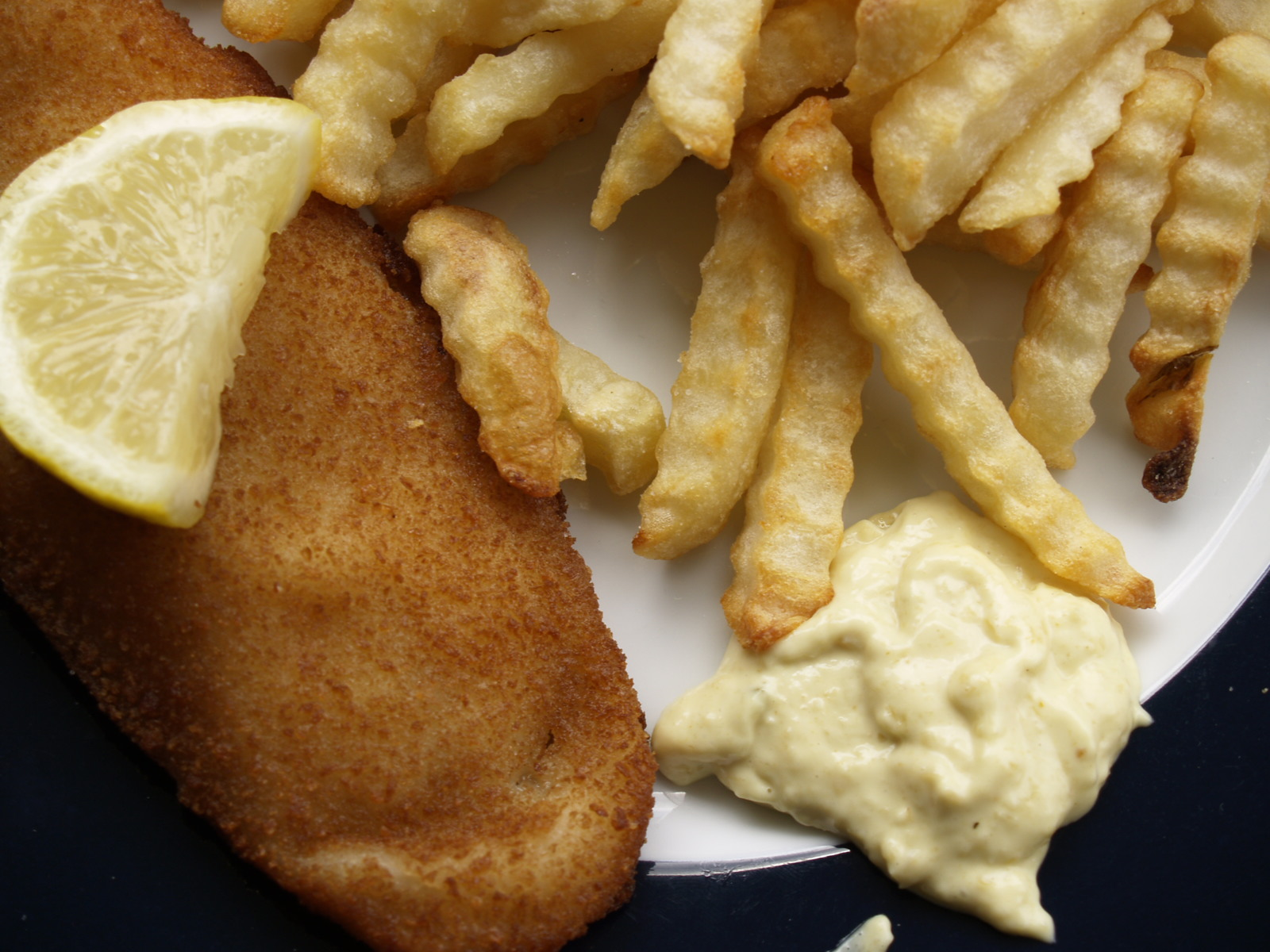
Danish remoulade is a widely used condiment

Sauces and condiments are an important part of the Danish meal:

- Béarnaise sauce, served with beef steaks
- Brown sauce (brun sovs). Variations include mushroom sauce, onion sauce and herbed brown sauce.
- Horseradish sauce (peberrodssovs), a cream sauce served with roast beef or prime rib. Sometimes frozen into individual servings for placement on hot roast beef.
- Ketchup, a must with red sausages, along with mustard.
- Mayonnaise, used in food preparation, and as a condiment with pommes frites (French fries). A generous dollop of mayonnaise is generally placed on top of shrimp.
- Mustard (sennep). A wide variety of mustards are available. Traditional mustard is a sharp flavored, dark golden brown, but many other types are used, including dijon, honey-mustard and other specialty flavored variants. Prepared salad mustard (yellow mustard) is generally eaten with red sausage or hot dogs. A special sweet mustard with dill is eaten with smoked salmon (laks).
- Parsley sauce (persillesovs), a white sauce with generously amounts of chopped fresh parsley.
- Pepper sauce, served with beef steaks and roasts.
- Remoulade, a very commonly used condiment. A popular (dipping) sauce for pommes frites (French fries), plaice, spring rolls, canned cod roe, roast beef, salami.
- Whiskey sauce, served with beef steaks and roasts
- White sauce. Various kinds of blanched vegetables are often added such as peas, peas and carrots, cauliflower, spinach, parsley or shredded cabbage. White sauce is typically flavoured with black pepper and nutmeg.

=== Cheese ===
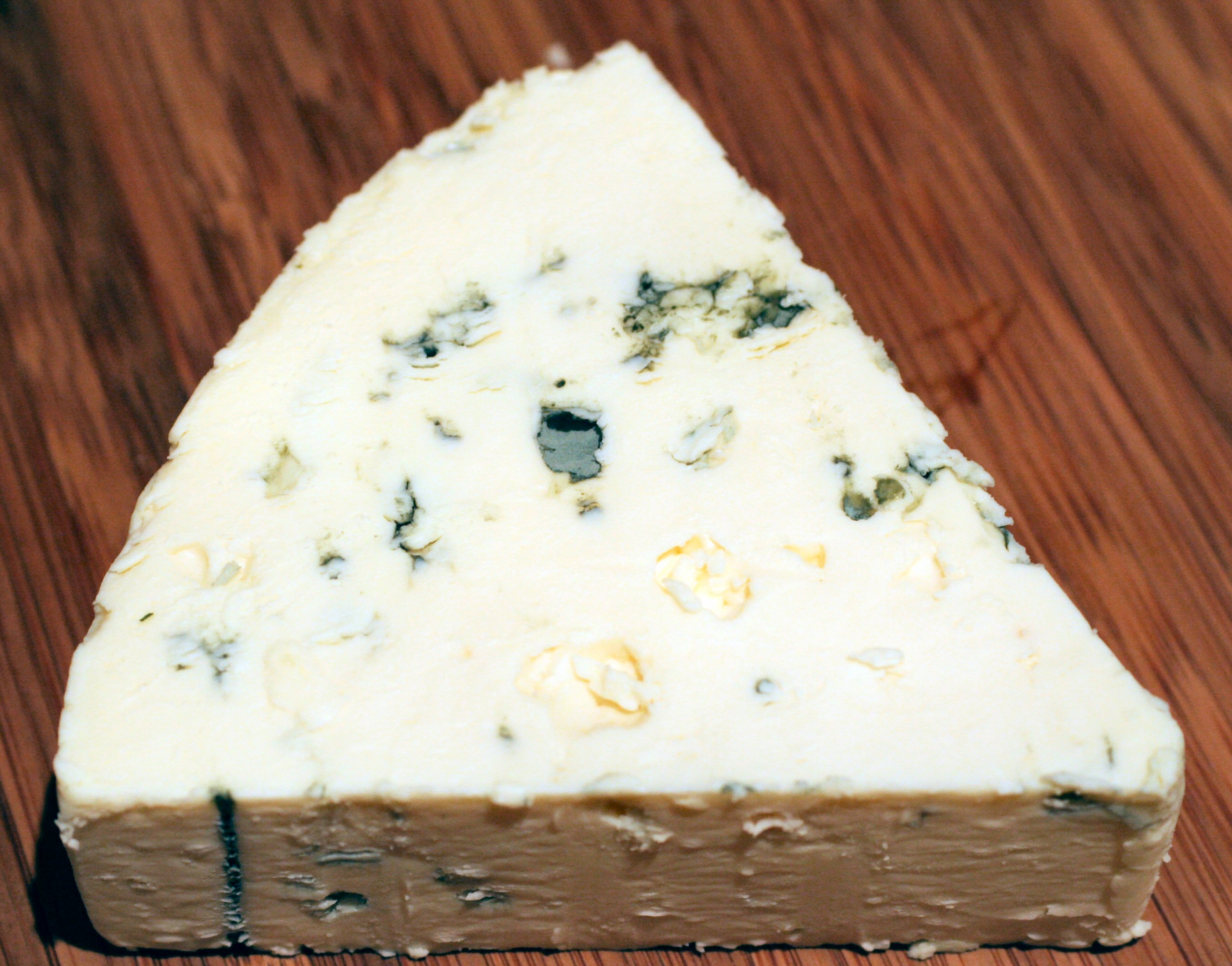
Danablu (Danish Blue cheese)

Denmark is known for quality dairy products, and that includes cheese. In Denmark, cheese might be served as part of breakfast, lunch or in salads and also as an after-dinner snack, referred to as a so-called ostebord (lit.: cheese-table) or ostetallerken (lit: cheese-plate) along with grapes, crackers and wine.

While the most commonly eaten cheese in Denmark is mild, there are also stronger Danish cheeses available, some of which are very pungent. Danish Blue cheese can be quite strong, and Danish cheese manufacturers produce molded cheeses that span the range from the mildest and creamiest to the intense blue-veined cheese internationally associated with Denmark. Another strong cheese is Gamle Ole (lit: Old Ole – Ole is a man's name), a brand of pungent aged cheese that has matured for a longer period of time. It can be bitingly strong. It is often served in combination with sliced onion and aspic (sky) on Danish rugbrød spread with lard. Rum may be dripped on this pungent cheese prior to serving.

Strong cheeses are an acquired taste for Danes too. Elderly Danes who find the smell offensive might joke about Gamle Ole's smelling up a whole house, just by being in a sealed plastic container in the refrigerator. One might also refer to Gamle Ole's pungency when talking about things that are not quite right, i.e. "they stink". Here one might say that something stinks or smells of Gamle Ole.

Danish cheese is almost exclusively produced from cow's milk. Some well-known Danish cheeses include:

- Danablu, a strong blue creamy cow's milk cheese.
- Blue Castello, a blue cheese
- Esrom, a semi-soft and aged cow's milk cheese. Both young and more matured versions are produced.
- Danbo, a semi-soft and aged cow's milk cheese. Mostly mild in flavor, but extensively aged and more pungent versions are also produced.
- Mycella, a traditional cow's milk creamy cheese. This cheese is often described as a Danish version of Gorgonzola.
- Vesterhavsost, a hard cheese from cow's milk, and aged in caves. Has a slightly nutty flavor.
- Havarti, a semi-soft cow's milk cheese, named after the experimental farm from which it originated in the mid-19th century.
- Apetina, a blanched cow's milk cheese. This cheese is often sold sliced up in small cubes, sometimes submerged in herb flavoured oil and used in salads much like Greek feta.
- Rygeost or røgeost. A smoked fresh soft cream cheese, made of cow's milk and buttermilk and an original speciality from the island of Funen. This cheese is spiced with caraway seeds and traditionally served with radish, chives and rye bread.

In relation to Apetina, Denmark lost a long legal battle with Greece, to use the term "feta" for Danish cheese produced using artificially blanched cow's milk. Since July 2002, feta has been a protected designation of origin (PDO), which limits the term within the European Union to feta made exclusively of sheep's/goat's milk in Greece. Because of the decision by the European Union, Danish dairy company Arla Foods (who also manufacture Danbo) changed the name of their Feta product to Apetina.

=== Seasonings and herbs ===
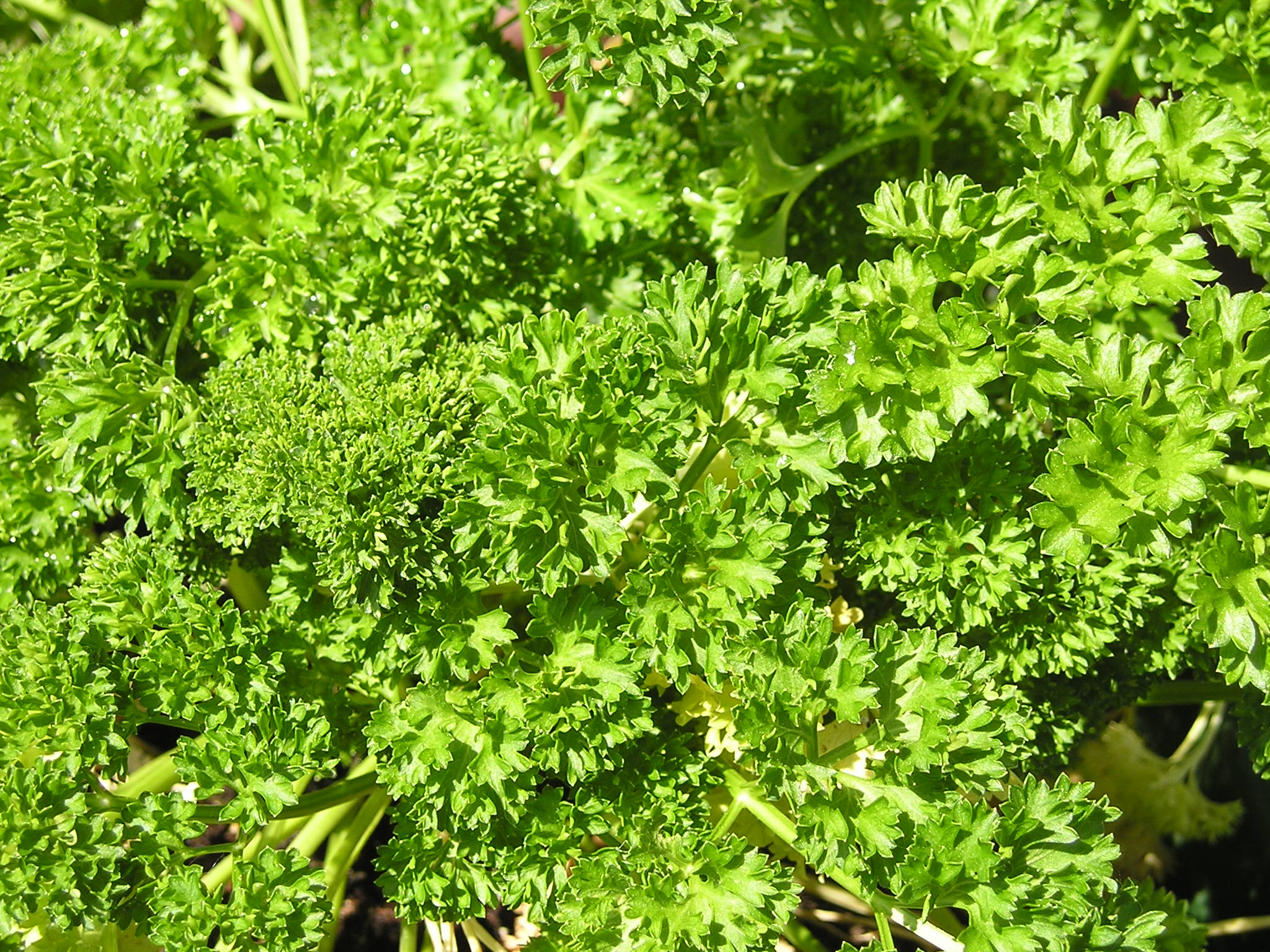
Parsley, used fresh and in sauces

Fresh herbs are very popular, and a wide variety are readily available at supermarkets or local produce stands. Many people grow fresh herbs either in the kitchen window, in window boxes or outside, weather permitting. Most commonly used herbs and other seasonings in Danish cooking:

- Bay leaves
- Black pepper
- Chives
- Cress
- Curry powder
- Dill
- Garlic
- Parsley
- Rosemary
- Thyme
- Oregano

Other spices used in the traditional Danish cuisine includes nutmeg, carraway, juniper, allspice and ginger (powder and candied). In modern times, the use and variety of spices has increased and now spices like chilli, paprika, basil and star anise is used widely.

=== Fruit ===
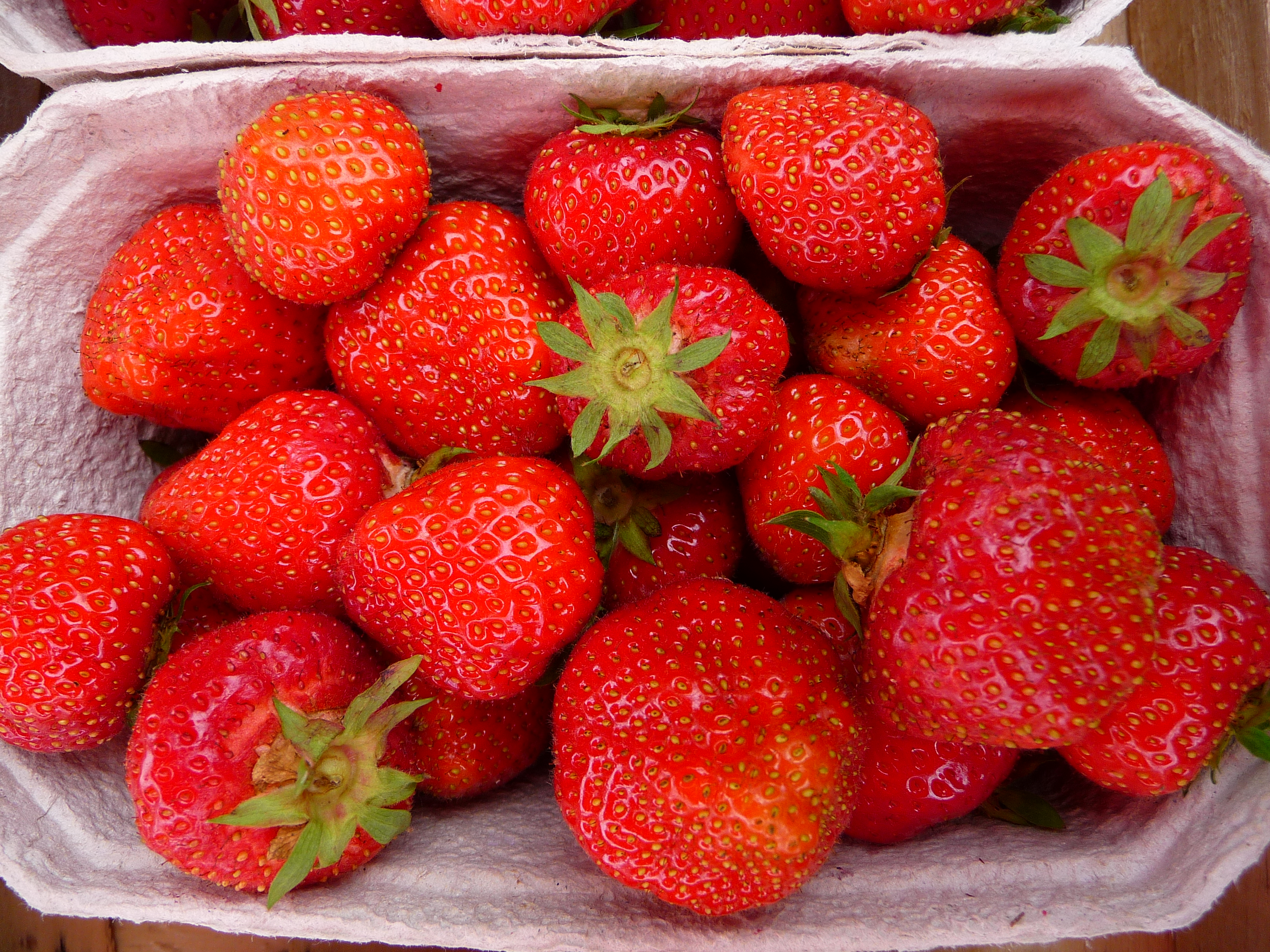
Fresh strawberries, a Danish summertime favourite

Similarly to vegetables, fruit had to withstand long storage during the winter to become a part of the traditional cuisine. Fruit is generally eaten in smaller portions, often as an accompaniment to cheese, or as decoration with desserts.

Fruit that is traditionally associated with Danish cuisine:

- Apples (Æbler) Popular in traditional dishes as 'winter apples' store well. Can be fried and served with Flæsk (thick bacon)
- Blackcurrant (Solbær), literally 'sun berries'
- Cherries (Kirsebær) When in season eaten fresh. But famously cooked into cherry sauce, traditionally served over rice pudding (risalamande) at Christmas. Also used in making Heering, a famous cherry liqueur, produced in Denmark.
- Gooseberry (Stikkelsbær) literally 'thorny berries'. Used for stewed gooseberries (stikkelsbærgrød).
- Pears (Pærer)
- Plums (Blommer)
- Raspberries (Hindbær)
- Redcurrants (Ribs) Made to jelly or simply mixed raw with sugar as (Rysteribs), served to roast.
- Strawberries (Jordbær), literally 'earth berries'

A combination of strawberries, red currants, black currants, blueberries and mulberries is known as "forest fruits" (skovbær) and is a common component in tarts and marmalades. A popular dessert is rødgrød, made from one or more kinds of berries or rhubarbs, boiled down to a red porridge. It is served with cream, sometimes milk.

"Rødgrød med fløde" is often jokingly used by Danes as a shibboleth, as it contains the soft "d" several times, which most foreigners find difficult to pronounce.

=== Baked goods ===
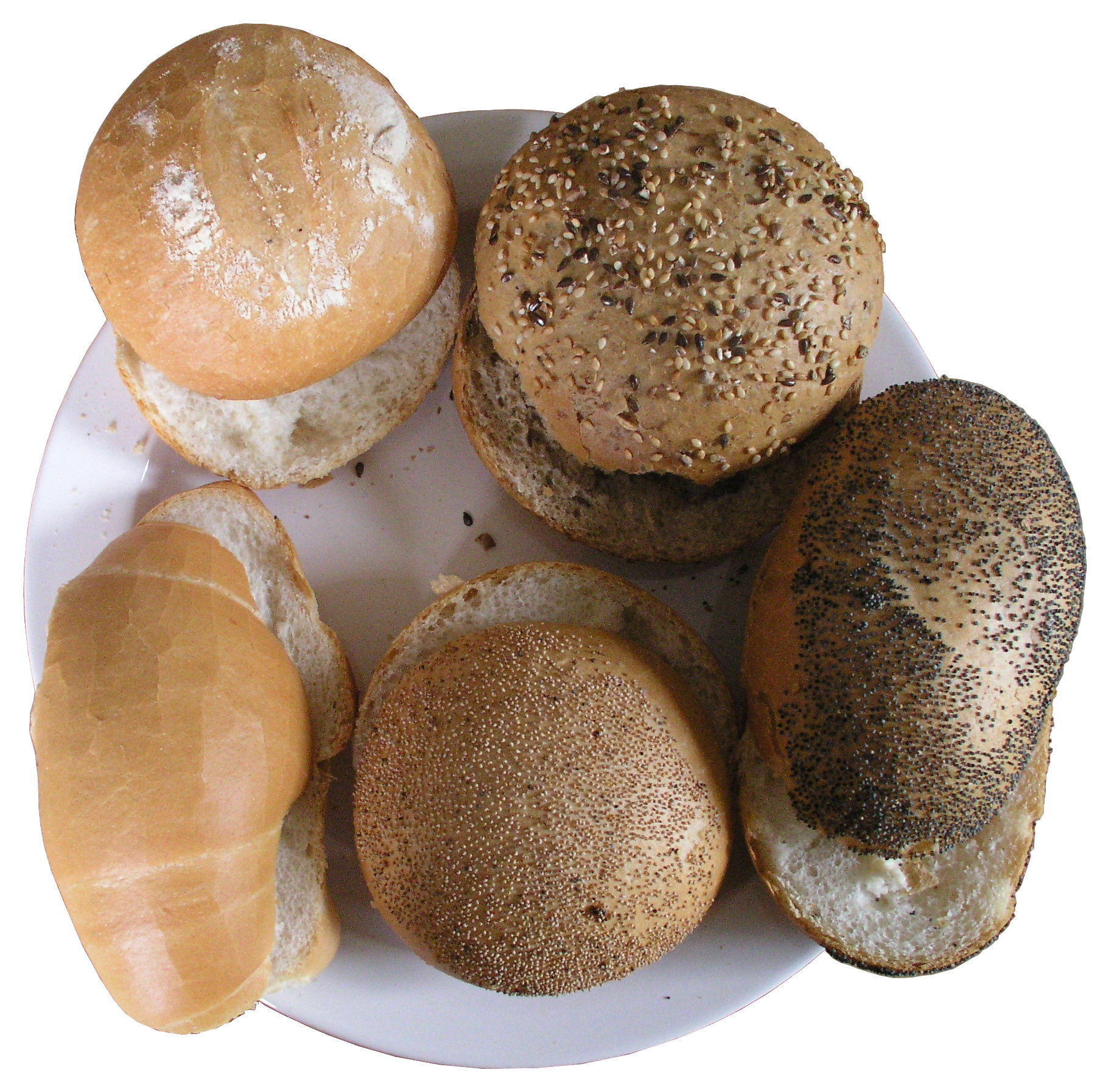
"Rundstykker", Danish breakfast rolls

Bread is a very important part of the Danish table. It is enjoyed at home, in the workplace or in restaurants and is usually based primarily on rugbrød, which is sour-dough rye bread. It is a dark, heavy bread which is sometimes bought pre-sliced, in varieties from light-colored rye, to very dark, and refined to whole grain. Rugbrød forms the basis of smørrebrød (see above). Many people still bake at home, particularly boller, which are small bread rolls, and often the traditional kringle, which is a pastry filled with Zante currants and remonce paste. The Danish franskbrød (lit: French-bread) are leavened wheat breads, roughly equivalent to white bread. Franskbrød are available in many varieties, ranging from whole wheat to pumpkin, chestnut, or poppy-seed sprinkled loaves and loaves containing maize, müsli or honey. Some loaves are made with alternative wheat sorts like emmer or spelt and some contains small amounts of low-gluten grains such rye. Leavened brown loaves are also referred to as franskbrød. People often eat jam with cheese on crusty white bread for breakfast, and also very thin slices of chocolate, called pålægschokolade. Because of the popular rye bread, Danes eat less wheat bread than most other western countries, even though bread is part of most daily meals.

==== Cakes ====
Denmark has a large variety of cakes and in 1997, the bakers guild launched the now countrywide celebration of Kagens Dag (Day of the Cake) as an annual recurring event in April–May. The region of Sønderjylland has become known for its concept of Sønderjydsk kaffebord, serving copious amounts of coffee and regional cakes on gatherings and festive afternoons. Typical Danish cakes include:

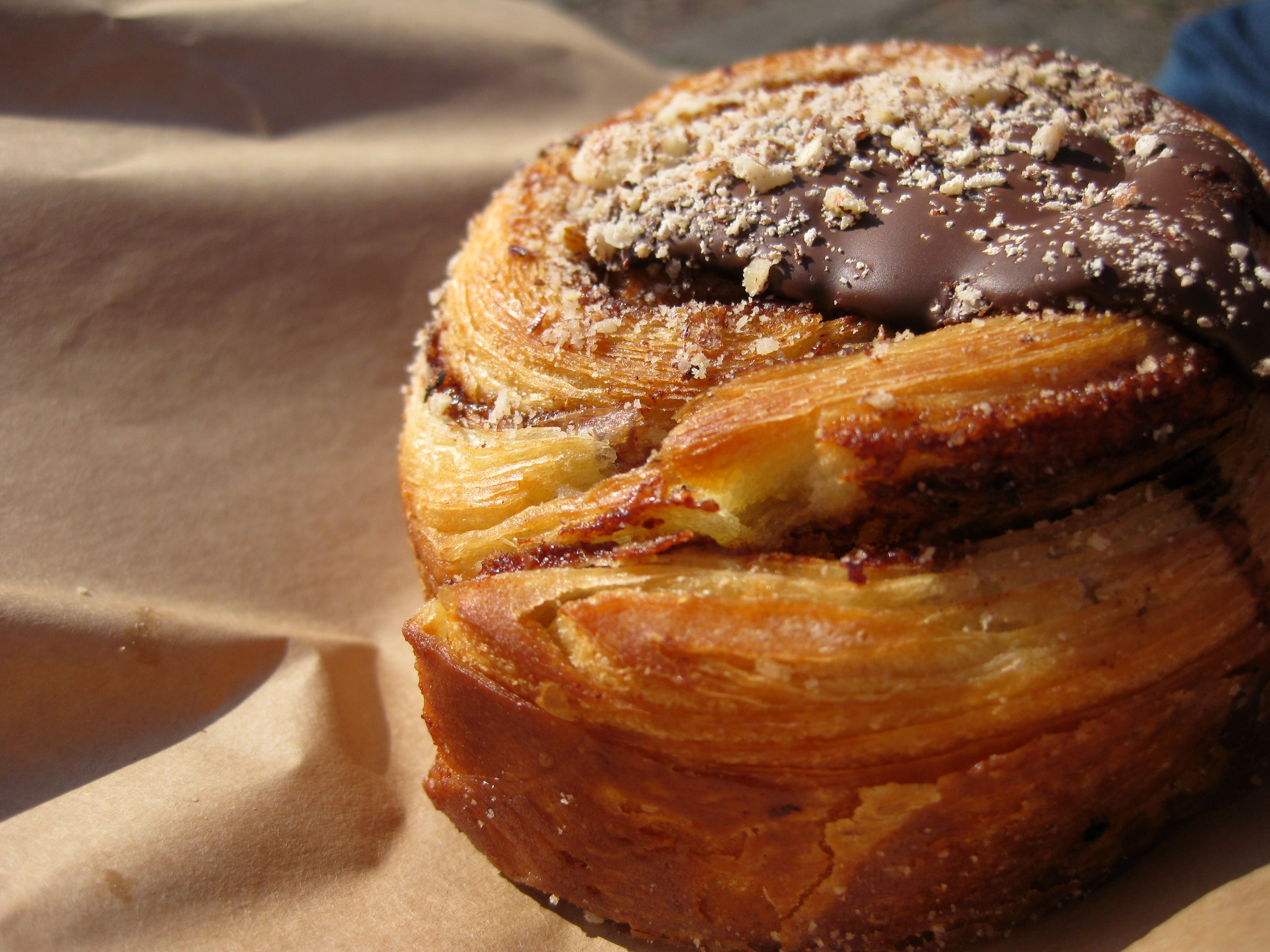
"Kanelsnegl". In Denmark, Danish pastry comes in many shapes and sizes.

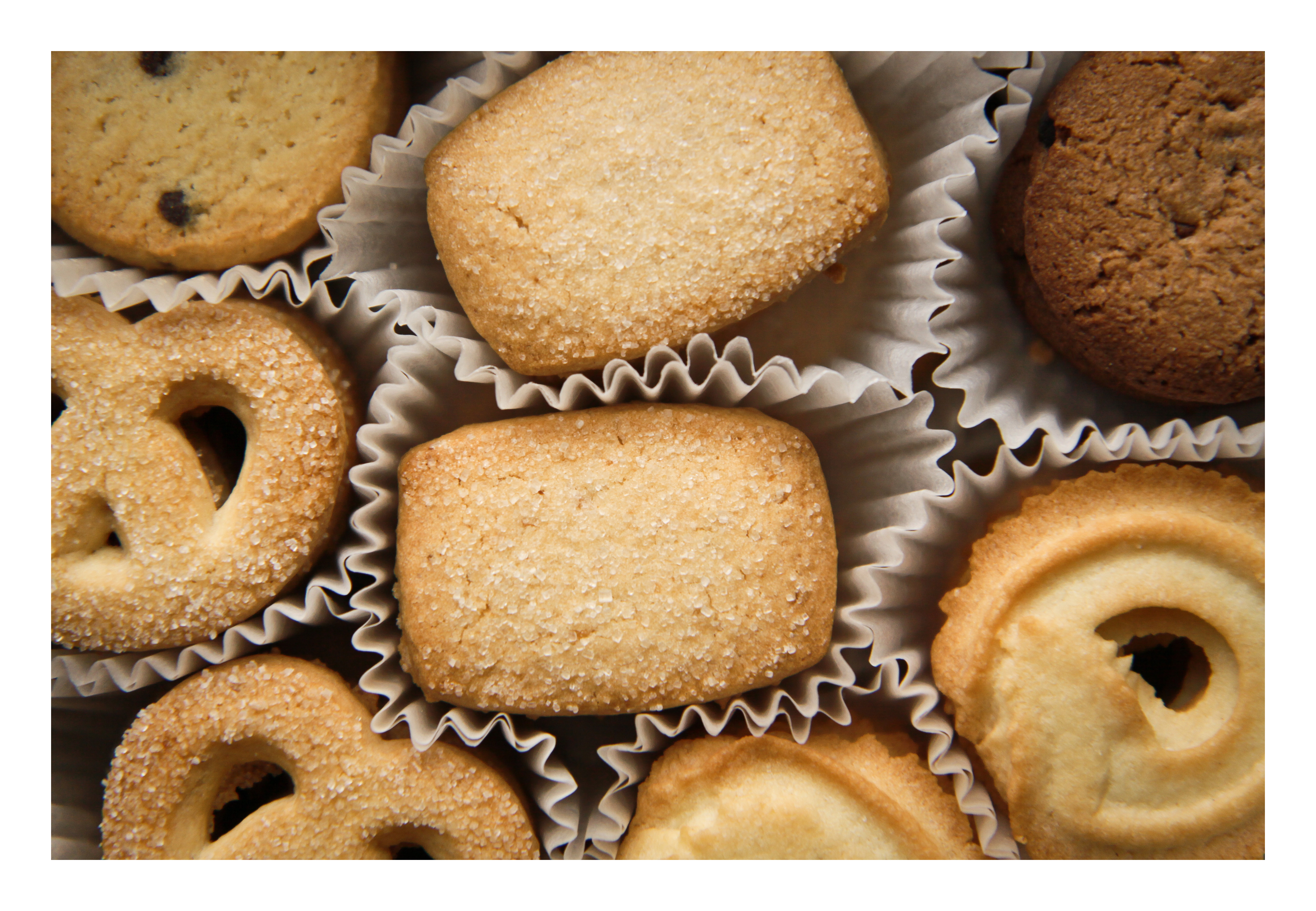
"Småkager". Denmark is a noted exporter of butter cookies.

- Wienerbrød (Danish pastry) – Denmark has a large variety of Danish pastries; most of the recipes are based on the same kind of dough.
  - Kringle – a pretzel-shaped Danish pastry. It has symbolized bakers in Denmark since the early Middle Ages, and in the United States "kringle" is associated with the country of Denmark.
  - Kagemand ("cake-man") – a Danish pastry in the shape of a man. Decorated with icing and candy. Traditionally served at children's birthday parties. In a traditional game, before serving, the head is cut off the cake man while the children scream loudly.
- Småkager ("small-cakes") – Cookies, usually baked hard and crusty in an oven, but both pan and deep fried versions exist. There is a large variety of småkager in Denmark. Most of the recipes came about when stoves became common property in the last part of the 1800s, but some recipes like Klejner and Pebernødder have been around since the Middle Ages. Quite a few recipes are associated with Christmas. Denmark has a significant export of quality butter cookies.
  - Pebernødder – ("pepper nuts") – A small, spicy cookie associated with Christmas. Traditionally used in a number of games.
  - Vaniljekranse – Vanilla-flavoured butter cookies in a ring-shape.
- Flødekager ("cream-cakes") – These cakes earn their name from the generous amounts of whipped cream used to make them and are served cold. The many varieties do not always include baked ingredients. They were largely introduced in the 1800s and 1900s when Konditorier became popular in larger towns. A Konditori is the Danish version of the French patisserie, and they were booming in the 1940s and 1950s.
  - Lagkage (layer cake) – This cake has thin sponge cake layers, often with mashed berries and whipped cream or custard between the layers and decorated with fruit on top. Layer cakes are usually considered a flødekage in Denmark. They are often used to celebrate birthdays, on which occasion they will traditionally be decorated with as many lit candles as the age of the celebrated individual. He is then supposed to blow them all out in one try or he will be in bad luck. Some Danish layer cakes follow strict recipes like the Rugbrødslagkage made with crumbled and toasted rye bread or the Othellolagkage, made with marzipan and chocolate cream.
  - Gåsebryst ("Goose breast") consists of a crisp puff pastry bottom with a generous spread of prune jam and a thick layer of whipped cream on top. The cake is wrapped in a thinly rolled layer of marzipan. Several slight variations exists and this particular cream cake is also popular in Norway.
- Tørkager ("dry-cakes") – As the name implies this kind of cake comprise dry cakes, as compared to the moist cream cakes and layer cakes, and they are often made with sweet shortcrust dough and served cold.
  - Kransekage ("ringcake") is a marzipan-based cake, usually served at special celebrations and on New Year's Eve. It comes in various shapes and sizes. A popular arrangement consists of a stack of ring shaped cakes of increasingly smaller size, creating an upside down cone form. The cake rings are decorated with white icing, and the arrangement is decorated with small red-and-white Danish paper flags. On special occasions they will hide a bottle of champagne. Kransekage is typically served with champagne on New Year's Eve or to celebrate weddings, "round" birthdays and anniversaries.
  - Studenterbrød ("graduates-bread") is a popular cold confectionery cake consisting of scratch-made thick cookie butter on a thin crispy crust of shortcrust dough with a spread of raspberry jam in-between. The cookie butter is flavoured with cocoa powder and rum, although the more inexpensive rum essence is normally used. Topped with chocolate icing and sprinkles.
  - Hindbærsnitte ("raspberry-slice") consists of two thin and crusty baked pieces of shortcrust with a spread of raspberry jam in between, covered in white icing and sprinkles. Similar to Alexandertorte
- Pies and tarts
  - Strawberry pie – very popular in the summer. Normally sold in bakeries with a chocolate covered crust and filled with marzipan.
  - Apple pie – oven baked. Served either hot or cold, usually with a dollop of crème fraîche or whipped cream, occasionally vanilla ice cream.
- Other cakes
  - Æbleskiver ("apple slices") – Fried spherical cakes made in special pans. Contrary to the name, æbleskiver is not made with apples, but of a puffy pancake dough with buttermilk and cardamom. Danes eat them hot throughout December as a Christmas tradition, served with both confectioner's sugar and jam (strawberry or black currant).
  - Pandekager (pancakes) – These are thin pancakes usually served with jam, granulated sugar and sometimes vanilla ice cream and rolled up before eaten.
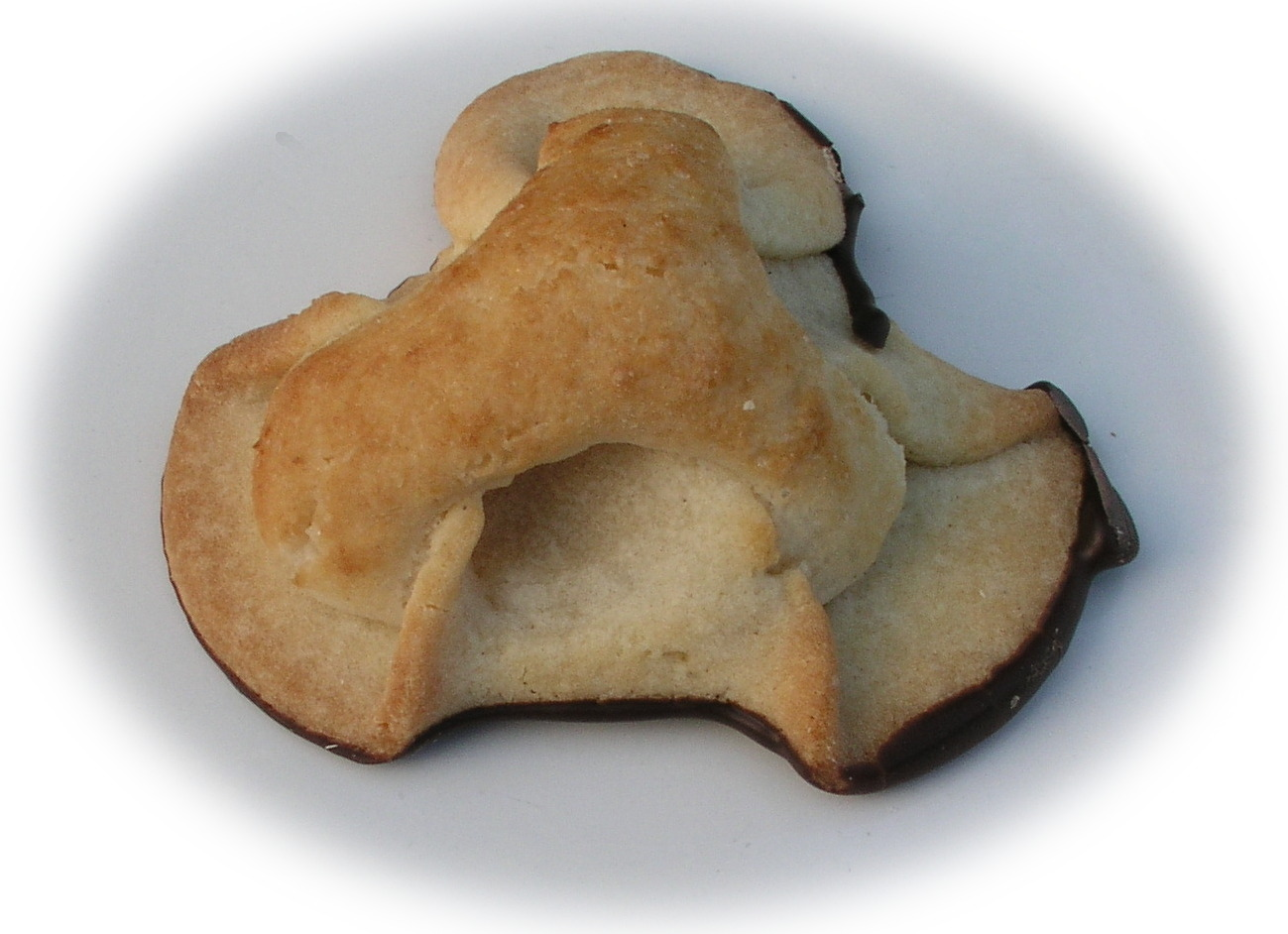
"Napoleons Hat", a marzipan-filled cake dipped in dark chocolate

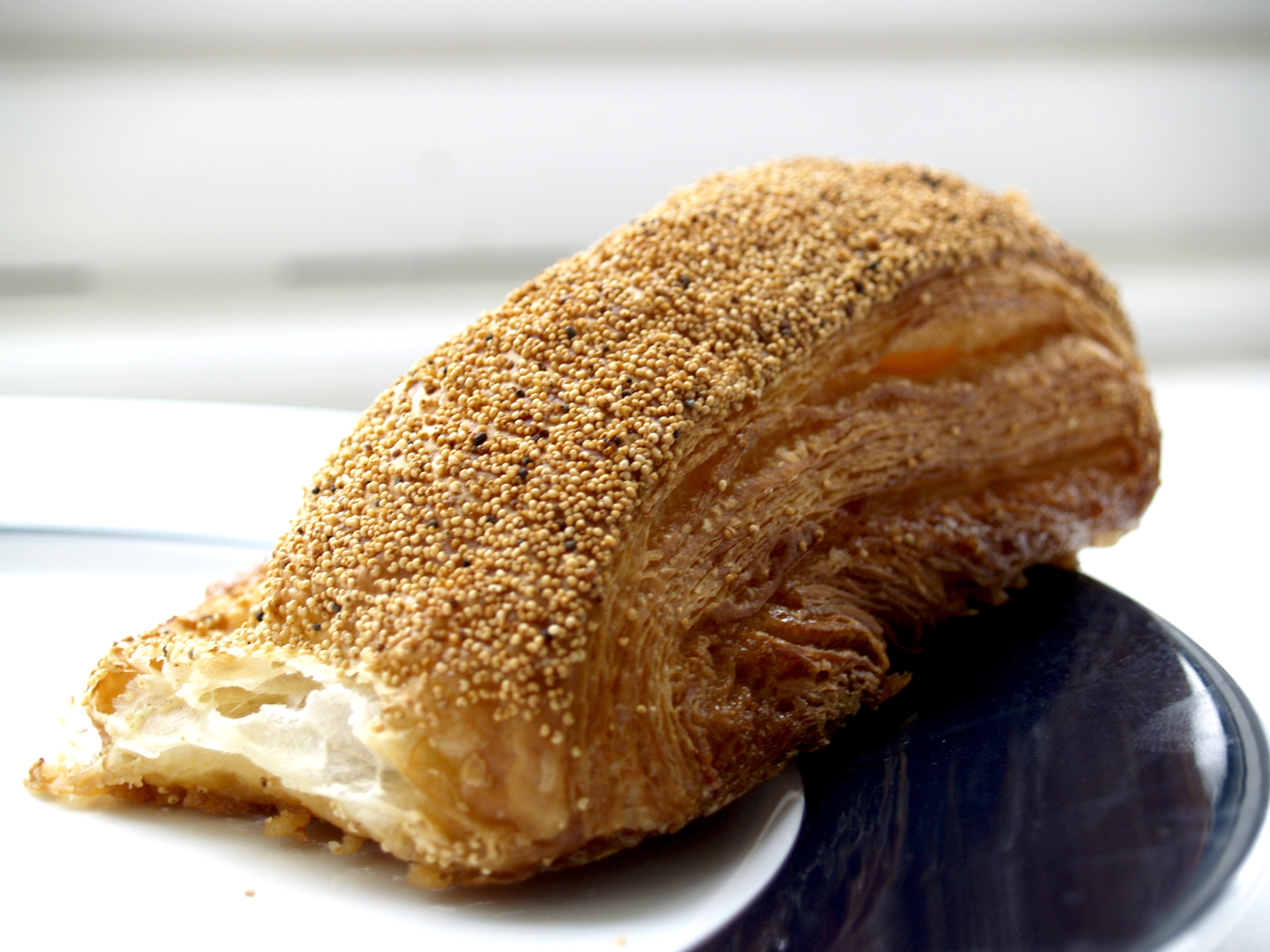
"Tebirkes", a Danish pasty with poppy seeds

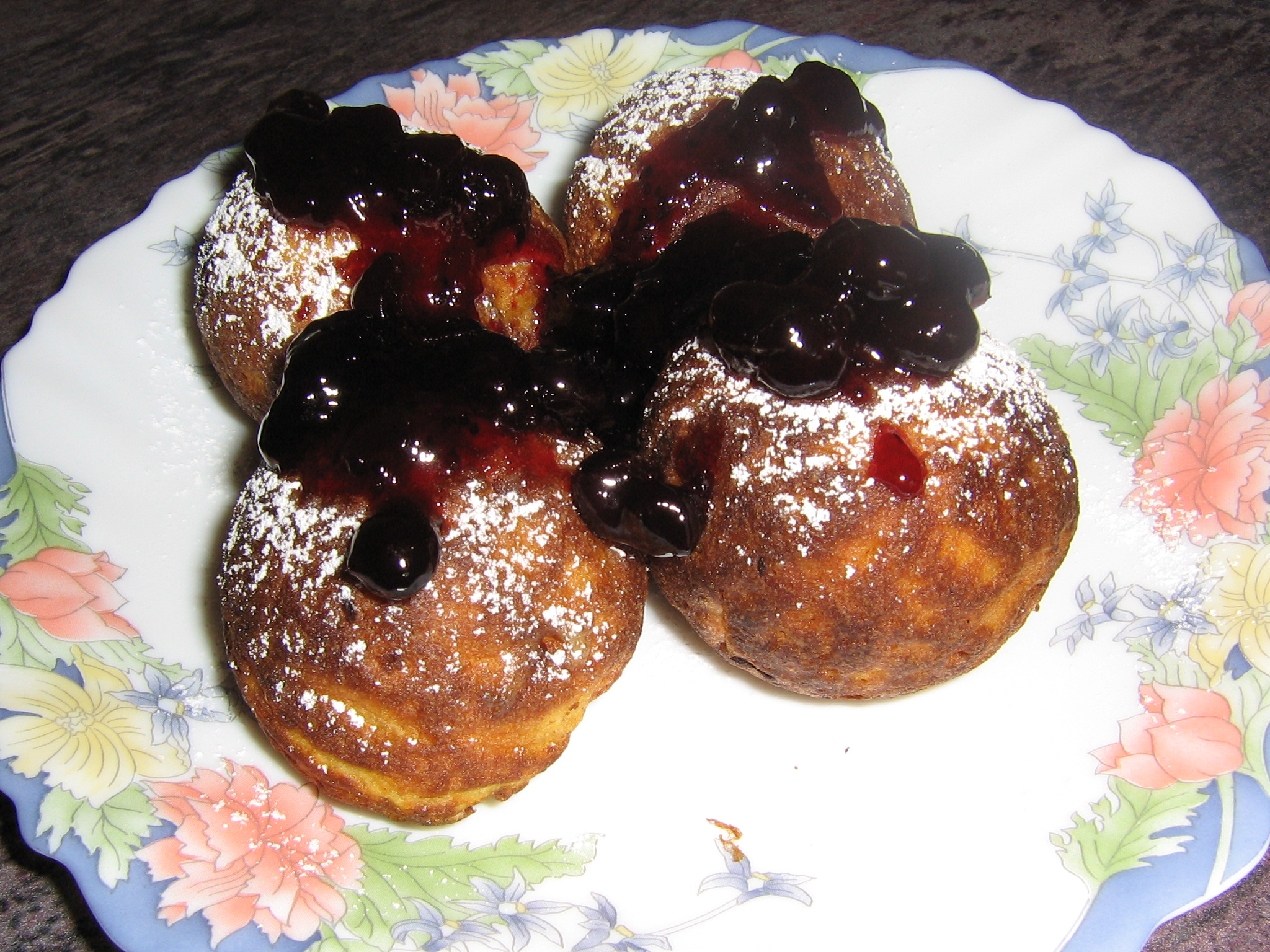
"Æbleskiver"

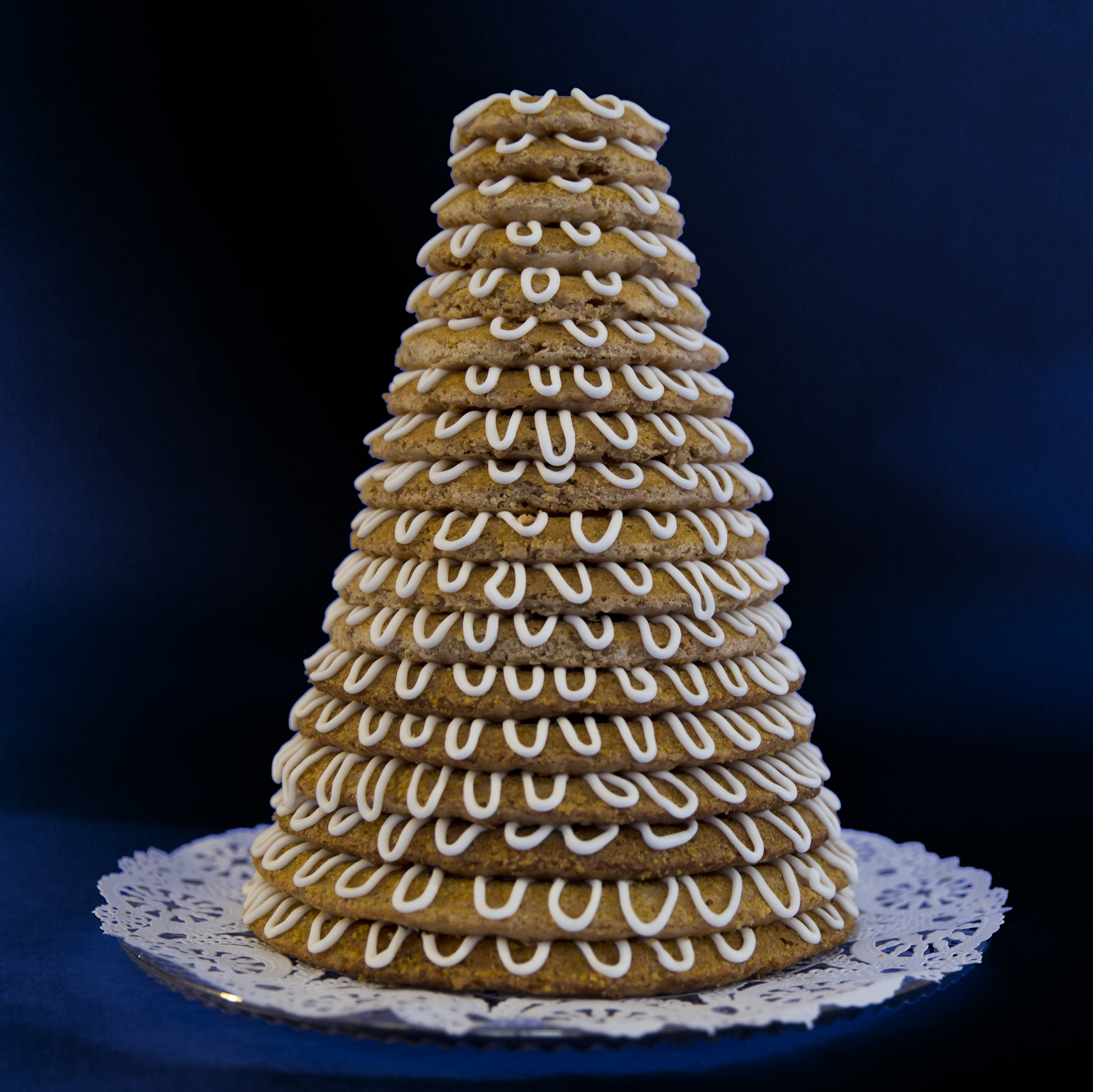
"Kransekage"

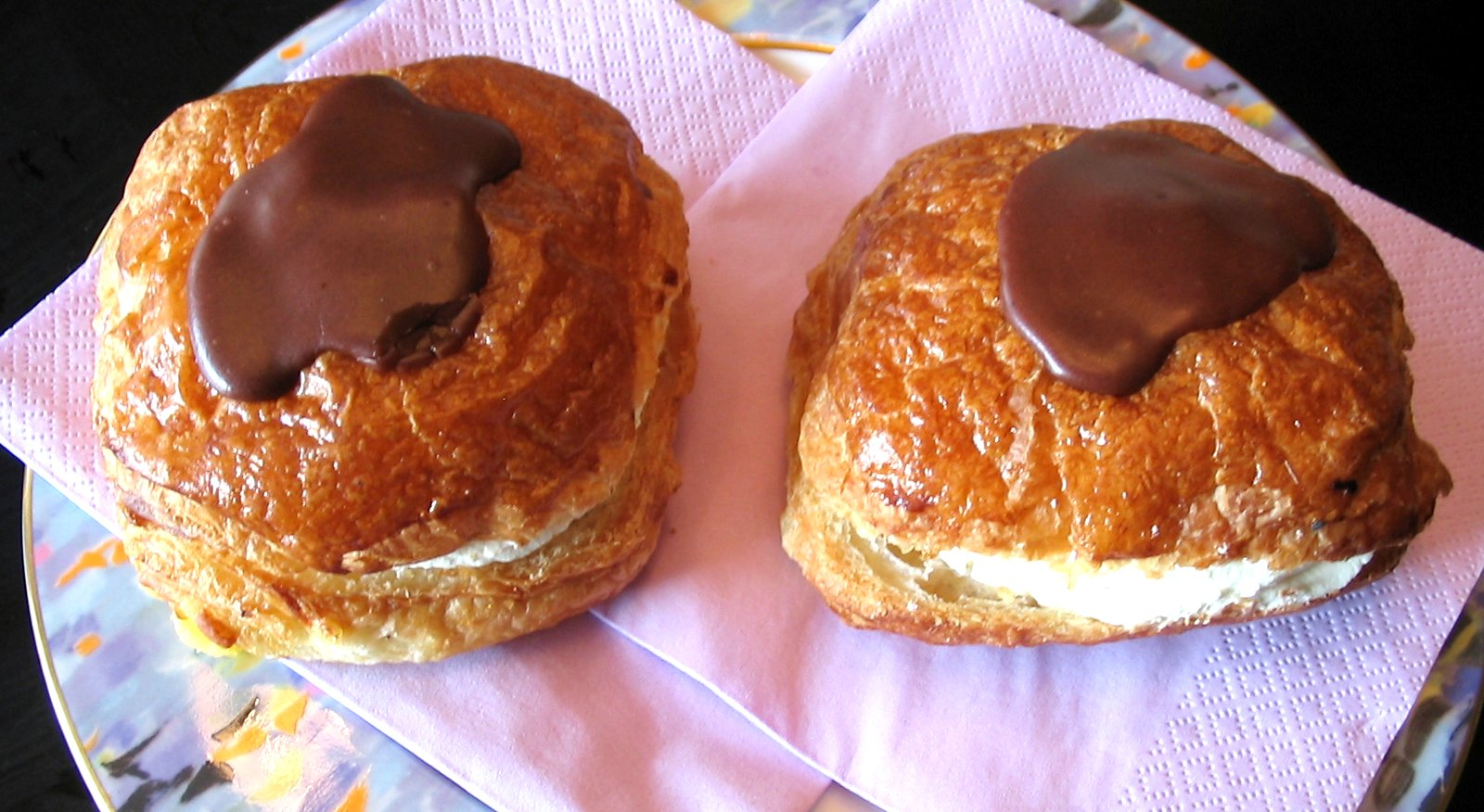
"Fastelavnsboller", carnival cakes

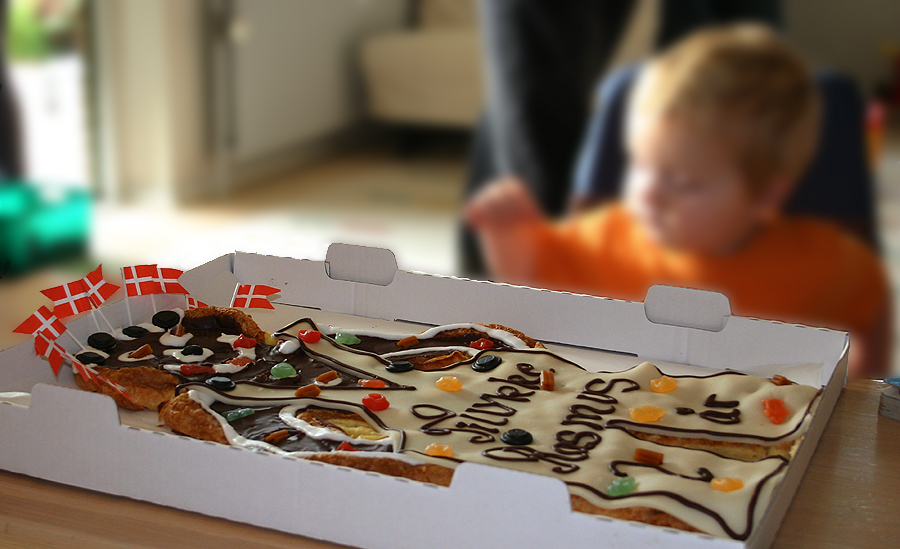
"Kagemand"

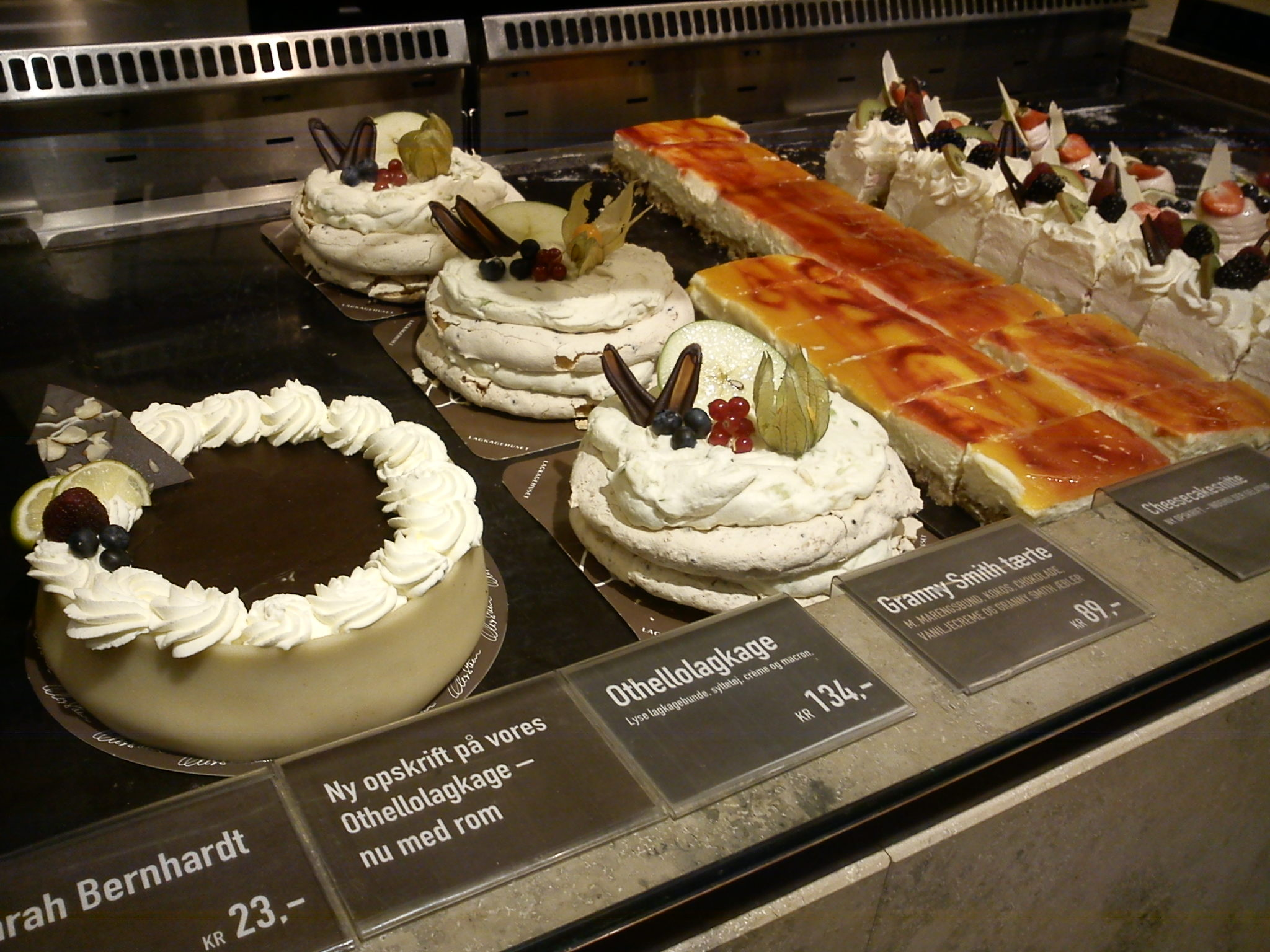
"Othellolagkage"

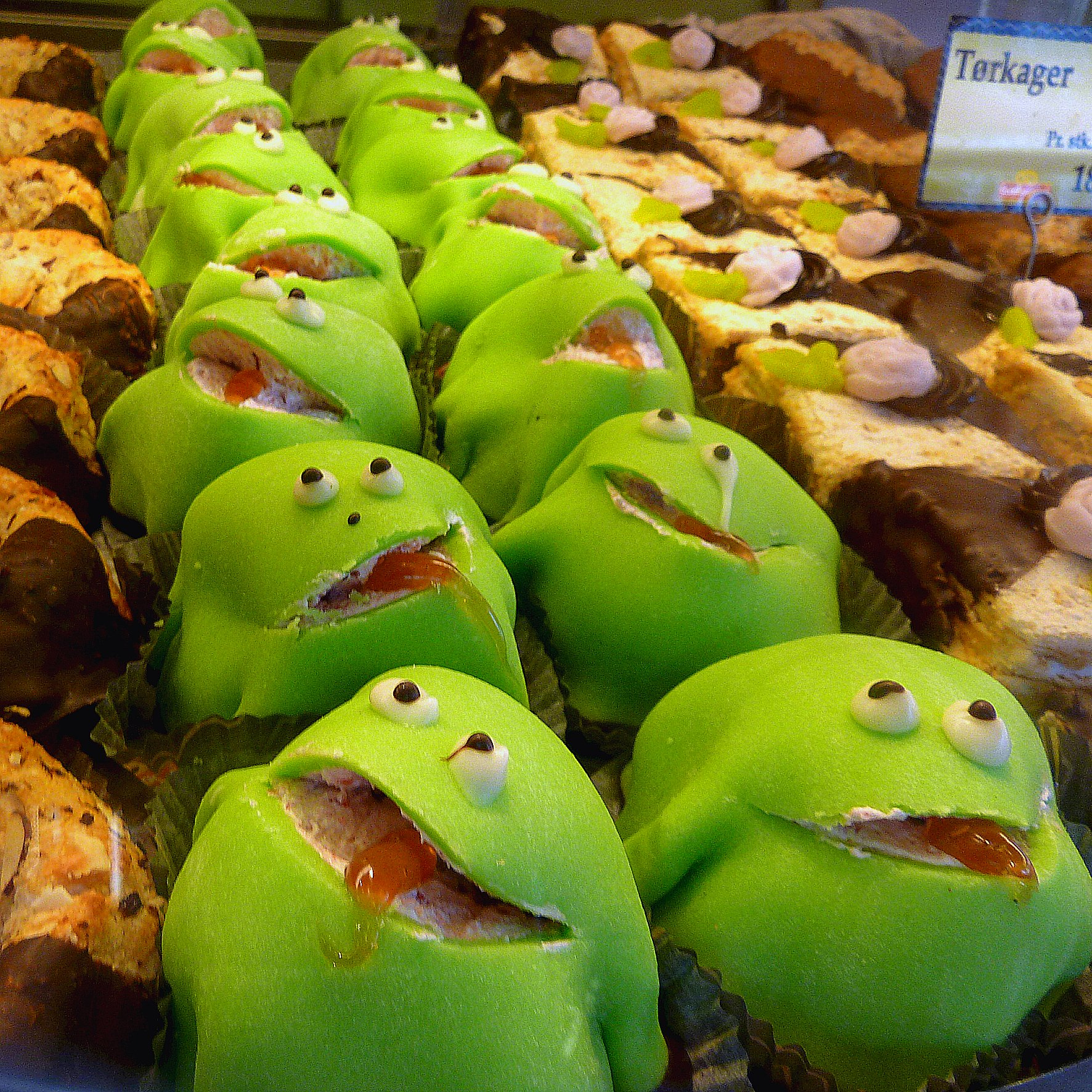
"Kaj kage", cream cakes resembling a frog

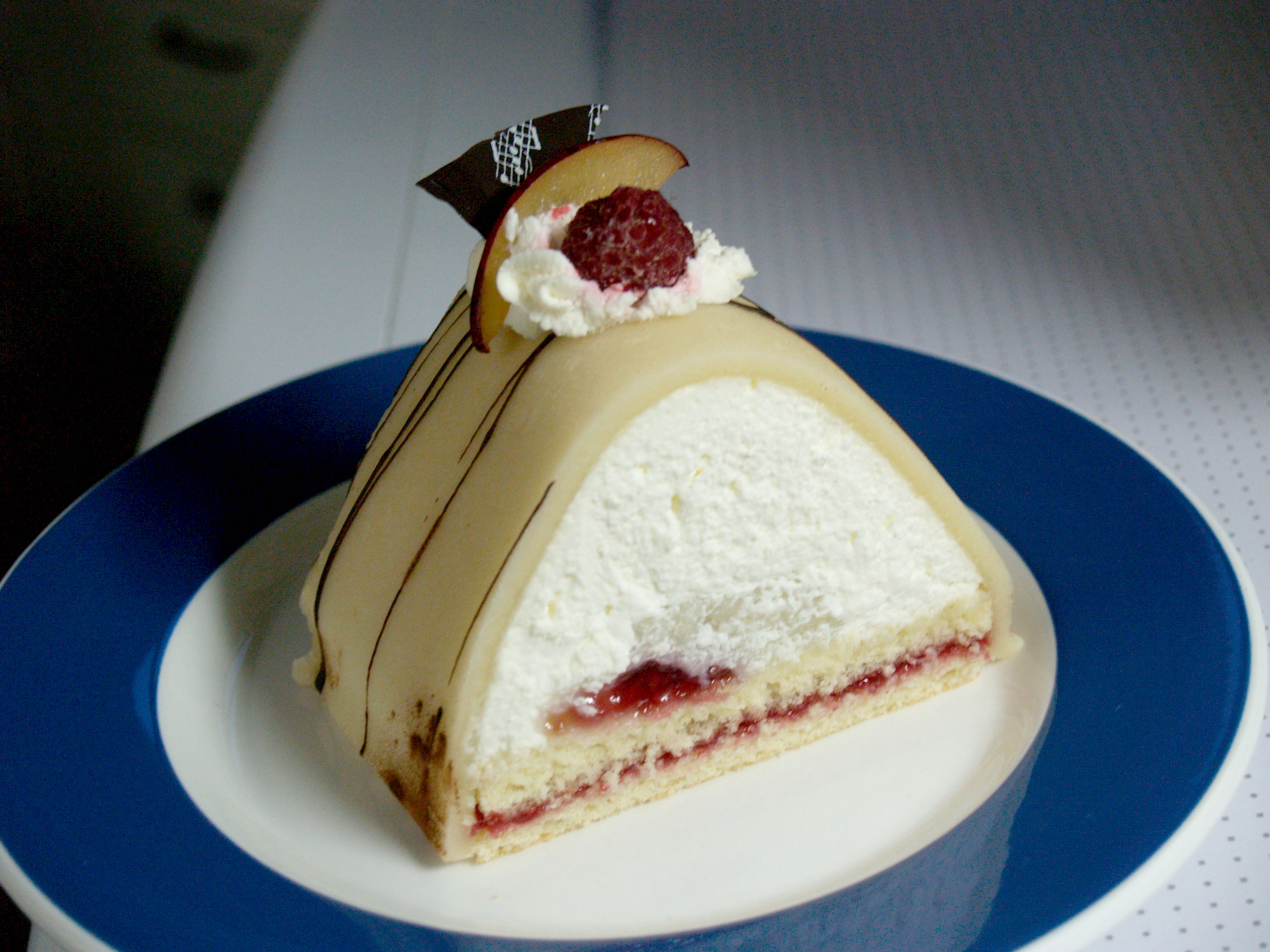
"Gåsebryst", a cream cake with marzipan

=== Sweets ===
Denmark is not a noted exporter of candies, but Danes eat more candy per capita than other countries.

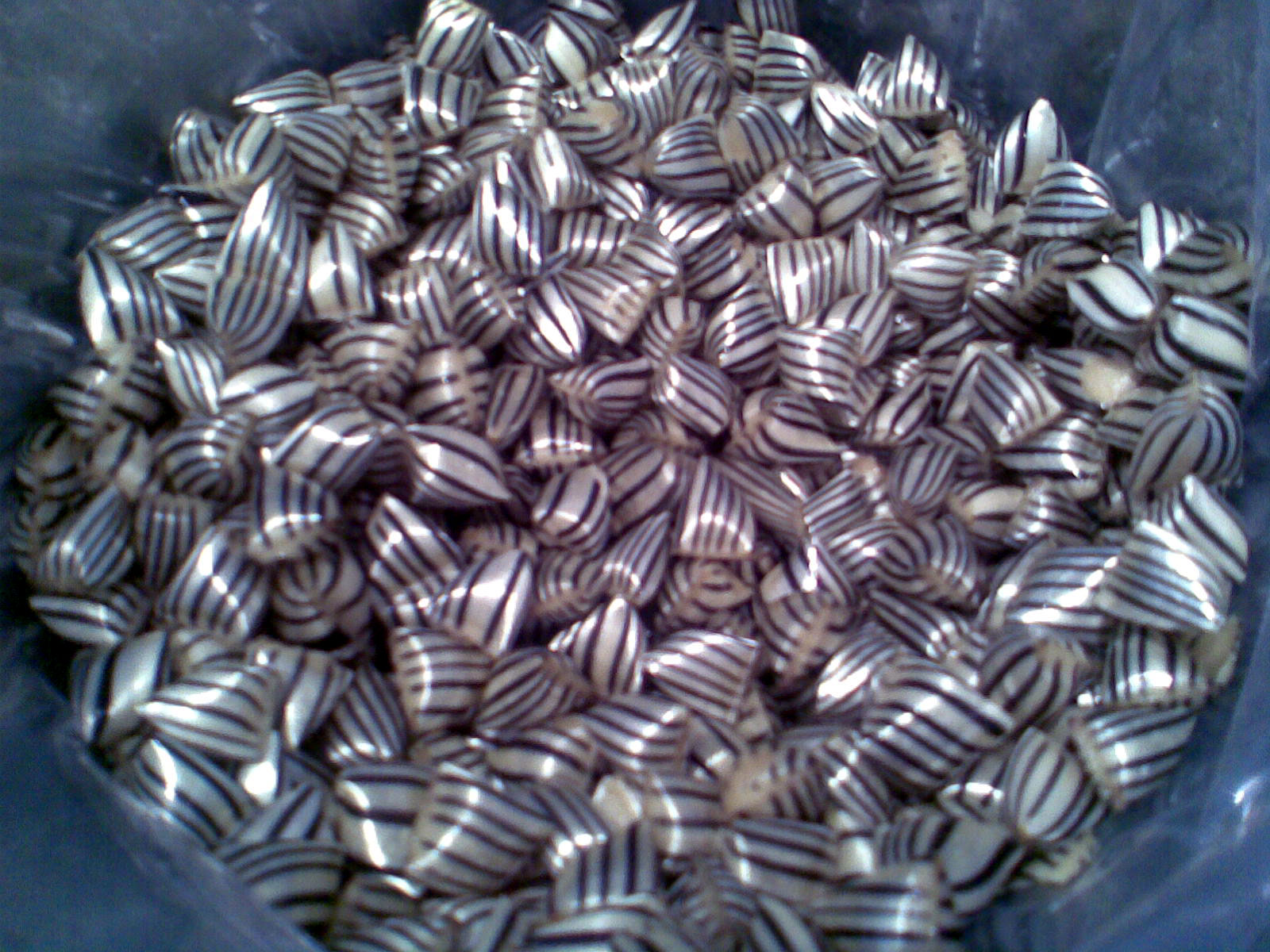
Liquorice and banana candy

- Chocolate – Denmark has a long tradition of producing chocolate known worldwide, the most famous brand is Anthon Berg.
- Liquorice – A very popular herb extraction in Denmark used for a number of widely available sweets, but also ice cream, desserts and in some dishes as well. Salmiaklakrids, flavoured with salmiak, and salty Salt lakrids are typical Danish candy. Denmark produces some of the strongest liquorice in the world and many Danes have a tendency to put liquorice (“lakrids” in Danish) on many other foods.
- Marzipan – A typical treat for Christmas, but enjoyed year round and also exported. Marzipan in Denmark is typically less sweet and with a higher content of almonds (or other nuts) than what you normally find elsewhere. The largest and best known exporter is perhaps Anthon Berg. However, in Denmark, only Ægte Marcipan (True Marzipan) is required to contain almonds; for ordinary marzipan, apricot kernels are widely used as substitutes for the more expensive almonds. Marzipan made with pistachios or walnuts is also sold but is not as common.
- Wine gums – While similar looking and often similar branded as in other European countries, Danish wine gums are much less sweet and have more texture.

There also exists a vast number of other types of sweets and candy, ranging from gumdrops and dragée to mints and caramel sweets. A concept known as Bland selv slik (literally "mix-yourself candy") is common in Danish supermarkets and kiosks. It comprises a number of lined-up containers, usually between 20 and 50, each with a different kind of candy, and customers then service themselves with a paper bag and a small scoop. The paper bag is then weighed, and paid for.

Both Danish and imported candy are found in these box assortments, and the shape, texture and flavor differences are often very creative. Candy has been manufactured resembling a vast number of objects, such as flying saucers, tennis racquets, soccer balls, butterflies, and even teeth and toothbrushes.

== Drinks ==
Traditional or popular drinks consumed in Denmark includes:

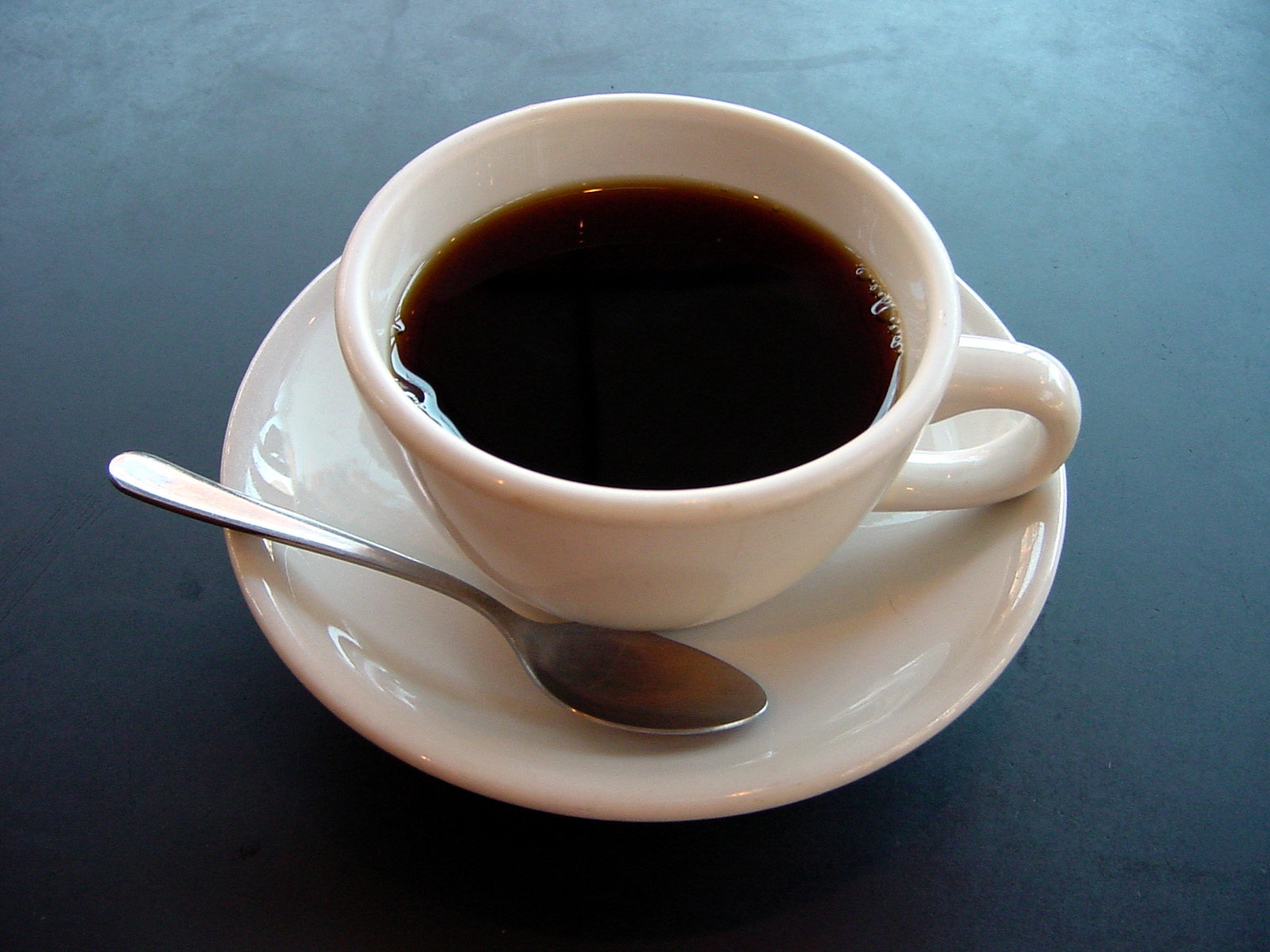
Along with other Nordic countries, Denmark is among the largest consumers (per capita) of coffee in the world.

- Coffee (Kaffe). Filter coffee is the most popular way to make coffee, closely followed by pressing. The coffee is mostly had black, but milk and sugar is usually offered. It is drunk throughout the day and evening, and always in the morning. Nearly all cafés serves a wide variety of coffee brews, from espresso to flat white and caffè latte. Coffee is a very popular beverage throughout the Nordic countries and Denmark has the fifth highest coffee consumption per capita in the world.
- Chocolate milk (kakaomælk) and hot chocolate (varm kakao). Cold chocolate milk is widely consumed and hot chocolate can be had in most cafés. At home, hot chocolate is often served to children as an essential part of family hygge.
- Hyldeblomstsaft. Sweetened elderflower drink, often mixed at home with added water. Sometimes served hot in the winter but usually cold.
- Danskvand, or hvid vand, is simply carbonated water. It is often flavoured with citrus.
- Saftevand, a diluting juice made from concentrated and sweetened fruit syrup. The syrup is mixed with plain water by the consumer and served right away. In former times, diluting juices were a luxury product in Denmark, because of the limited availability of sugar, but from the 1980s and 90s, the consumption had risen to the popularity it experiences today. Many different kinds, including artificial products.
- Sodavand are soft drinks of various flavours and it has long been a very popular drink. International brands like Coca-Cola, Pepsi, Fanta and Sprite is widely consumed, but there are many local brands of soft drinks as well, some of which are unique. This includes Nikoline (without artificial flavours), Tuborg Squash, Faxe Kondi or the traditional citronvand (lemon soda) and hindbærbrus (raspberry soda).

Notable alcoholic beverages includes:

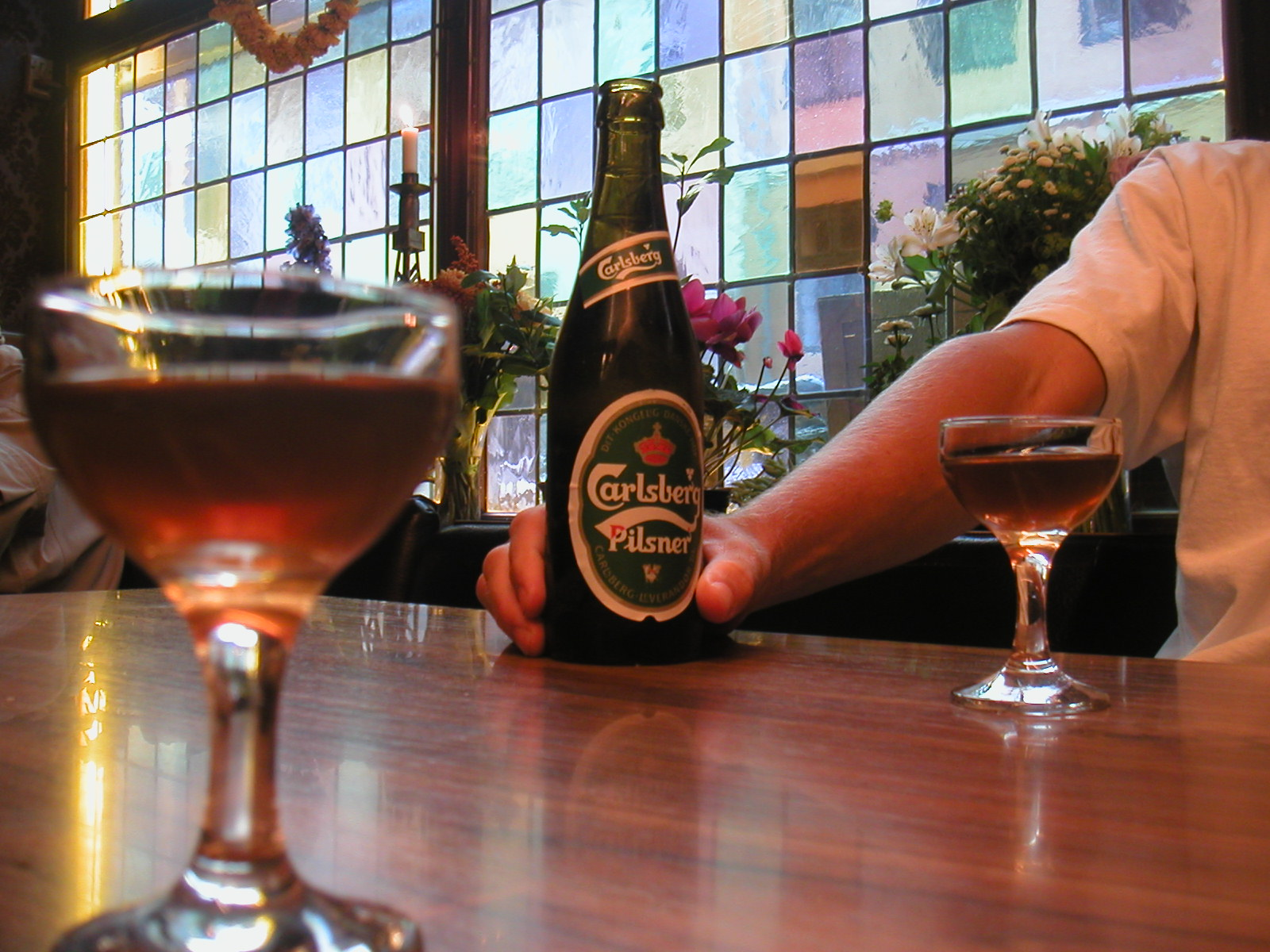
Øl og snaps, (beer and akvavit)

- Akvavit, usually called snaps. A clear, high proof spirit made from potatoes but, unlike vodka, always flavoured with herbs (dill, caraway, sweetgale, etc.)
- Beer (øl) has been widely consumed in Denmark for millennia. Carlsberg and Tuborg are two large Danish producers with a notable export. Drinking a "pilsner" is a favored activity by many Danes after work or, when relaxing or socialising. The pilsner type is the dominant beer type, but many other types are available. In the 2000s, small breweries have been budding up all over the country with new local brews of all kinds.
- Bitters. The most popular bitter is Gammel Dansk (translated, Old Danish).
- Mjød, mead is known from the Ásatrú and is rarely consumed in Denmark.
- Fruit wines. Cherry wine, apple wine, black currant wine, elderberry wine.
- Gløgg, hot punch made with red wine, brandy and sherry with raisins and almonds. Spiced with cloves and cinnamon, part of the Christmas tradition.
- Wine (vin) is ever more popular. Almost exclusively imported wines, as Danish wine is only produced in small quantities and is still rare to find outside speciality shops.

== Criticism ==
The Danish food culture is sometimes criticized by gastronomes and nutritionists.

Substantial criticism has been directed at the nutritional content of Danish food—for example, at the ratio of meat, side dishes, and greens on the plate. Nutrition information campaigns have been trying to get the Danes to become healthier by eating less meat, fat, and sugar, and more raw vegetables. A study from 1997 showed that instead of a healthier diet, however, the results too often have been feelings of guilt and a view of food as something which is just the correct fuel for the body's machinery.

Historian Søren Mørch has characterized the Danish cuisine as a "garbage kitchen" of insipid, sweet and unspiced "baby food" where the tastes of milk and sweetness form the key elements. He believes that it arose because the export policy of the Danish food sector was to use the Danish home market as a "gutter" for left-over products, after high-quality bacon and butter had been sold abroad. Skimmed milk, meat scraps only suitable for chopping up, and the replacement product margarine are all products Mørch describes as residue products.

== Frøken Jensens Kogebog ==
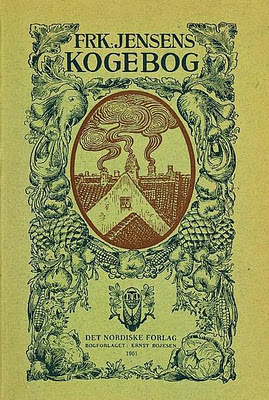
Cover to Frk. Jensens Kogebog, 1901

The cookery book was published by Kristine Marie Jensen (1858–1923) in 1901 and titled Frk. Jensens Kogebog (Miss Jensen's Cookbook) is considered by many Danes to contain all the authentic recipes for traditional dishes as well as for baking bread, cakes, and biscuits. It has been reprinted dozens of times and new editions can be found in most Danish bookshops today. When Danes prepare meals for special occasions, for example at Christmas time, they frequently follow Frøken Jensen's detailed descriptions. The book has not been translated into English but many of the traditional Danish recipes on English-language websites are those of Frøken Jensen. The original edition (only in Danish) is available online.

== See also ==
- Faroese cuisine
- Greenlandic cuisine
- List of Christmas dishes
- Sønderjysk kaffebord

== Literature ==
- Kristine Marie Jensen (2008): Frøken Jensens Kogebog , (in Danish) 1st ed., Gyldendal. ISBN 9788702070385
  The first revised and updated edition by Nanna Simonsen. Published on K.M. Jensens 150 year birthday.
- Bent Christensen (2008): Gastronomien i Danmark, Lindhart og Ringhof Forlag, ISBN 978-87-11-43071-2 (in Danish)
  The story of the most famous chefs and the best restaurants in Denmark since WW II.
- Bettina Buhl (2015): Danskernes Småkager – et småkageleksikon, Gyldendal (in Danish)
  Småkager in Denmark from a food-historical viewpoint.
- Bettina Buhl (2017): Sovs skal der til – opskrifter & historie, Gyldendal (in Danish)
  Sauces in the traditional Danish cuisine from a food-historical viewpoint.

== Bibliography ==
- Jacobsen, Jan Krag; Husby, Ida; Skaarup, Bi; Holm, Lotte; Carlsen, Helle Brønnum; Bojesen, Rasmus Bo (1997), Maden i kulturhistorisk perspektiv
- Jensen, Kristine Marie (edited and updated by Lundsgaard, Bente Nissen and Bloch, Hanne): Frøken Jensens kogebog, Copenhagen, Gyldendal, 2003, 366 p. (in Danish) ISBN 87-00-21271-7
- Meyer, Claus: Almanak, Copenhagen, Lindhardt og Ringhof, 2010, 694 p. (in Danish) ISBN 978-87-11-43070-5
- Redzepi, René: Noma: Time and Place in Nordic Cuisine, London, Phaidon Press, 2010, 368 p. ISBN 978-0-7148-5903-3.
- Færch, Tove; Møller, Maja; Hougaard, Anne Kirstine, eds. (2008), Det gode madliv – Karoline, maden og måltidet i kulturen, Arla Foods. (in Danish) ISBN 978-87-992509-1-2
- Astrup, Arne; Meyer, Claus (2002), Spis igennem (in Danish) (1. ed.), Politikens Forlag, ISBN 87-567-6742-0
