= List of butter dishes =

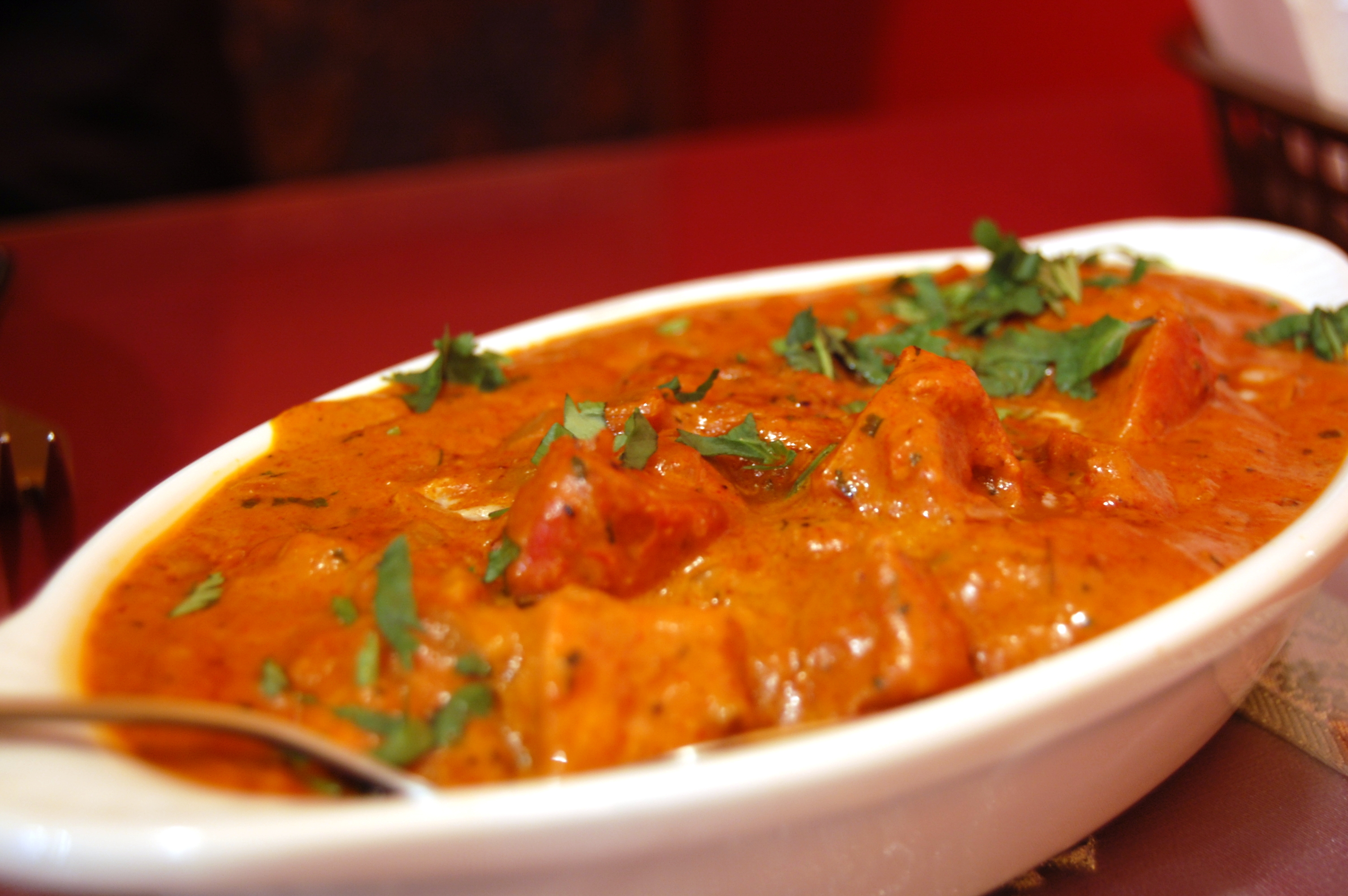
The Indian dish butter chicken is rich in butter and cream.

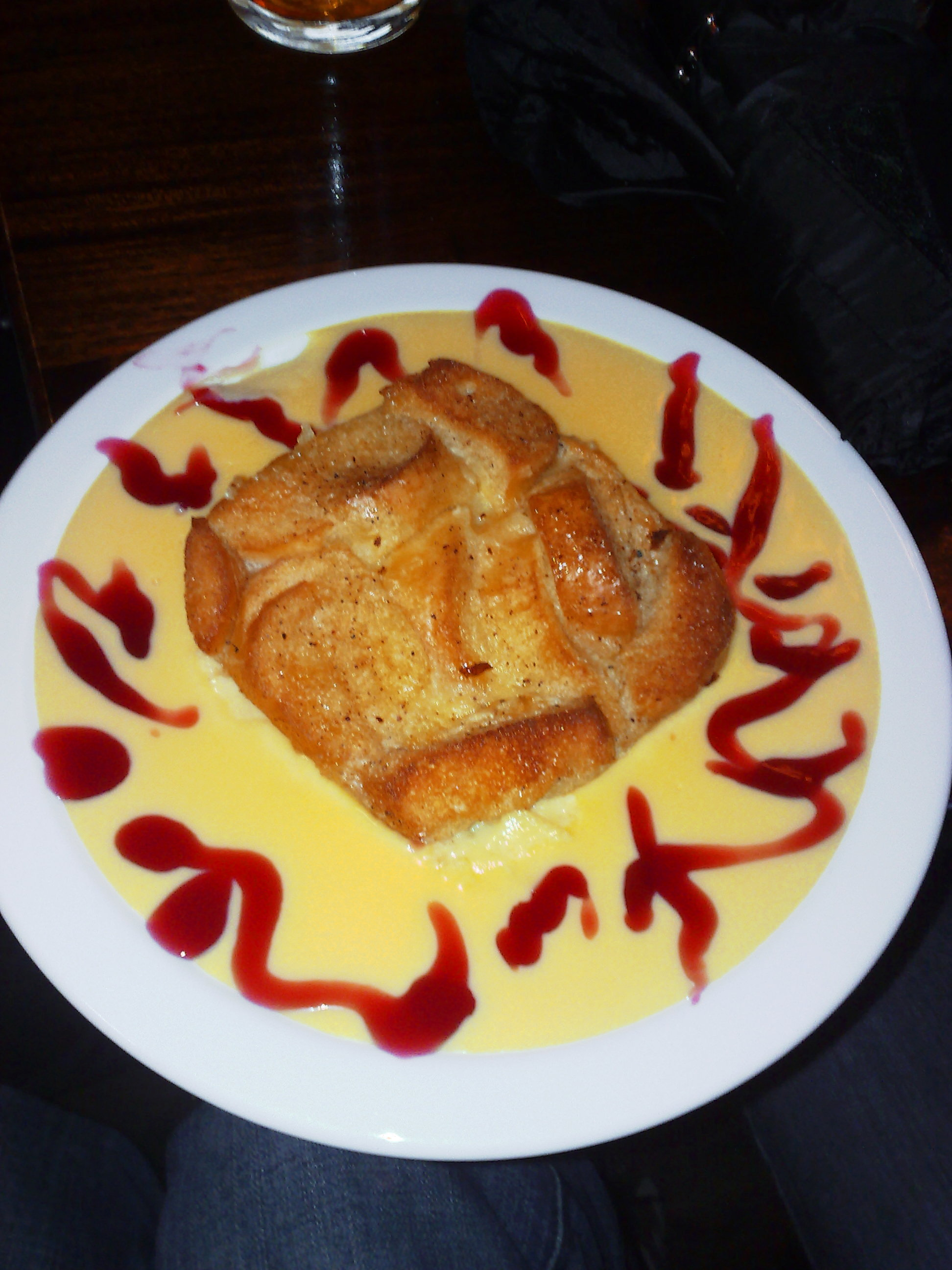
Bread and butter pudding served with custard

This is a list of notable butter dishes and foods in which butter is used as a primary ingredient or as a significant component of a dish or a food. Butter is a dairy product that consists of butterfat, milk proteins, and water. It is made by churning fresh or fermented cream or milk.

== Butter dishes and foods ==
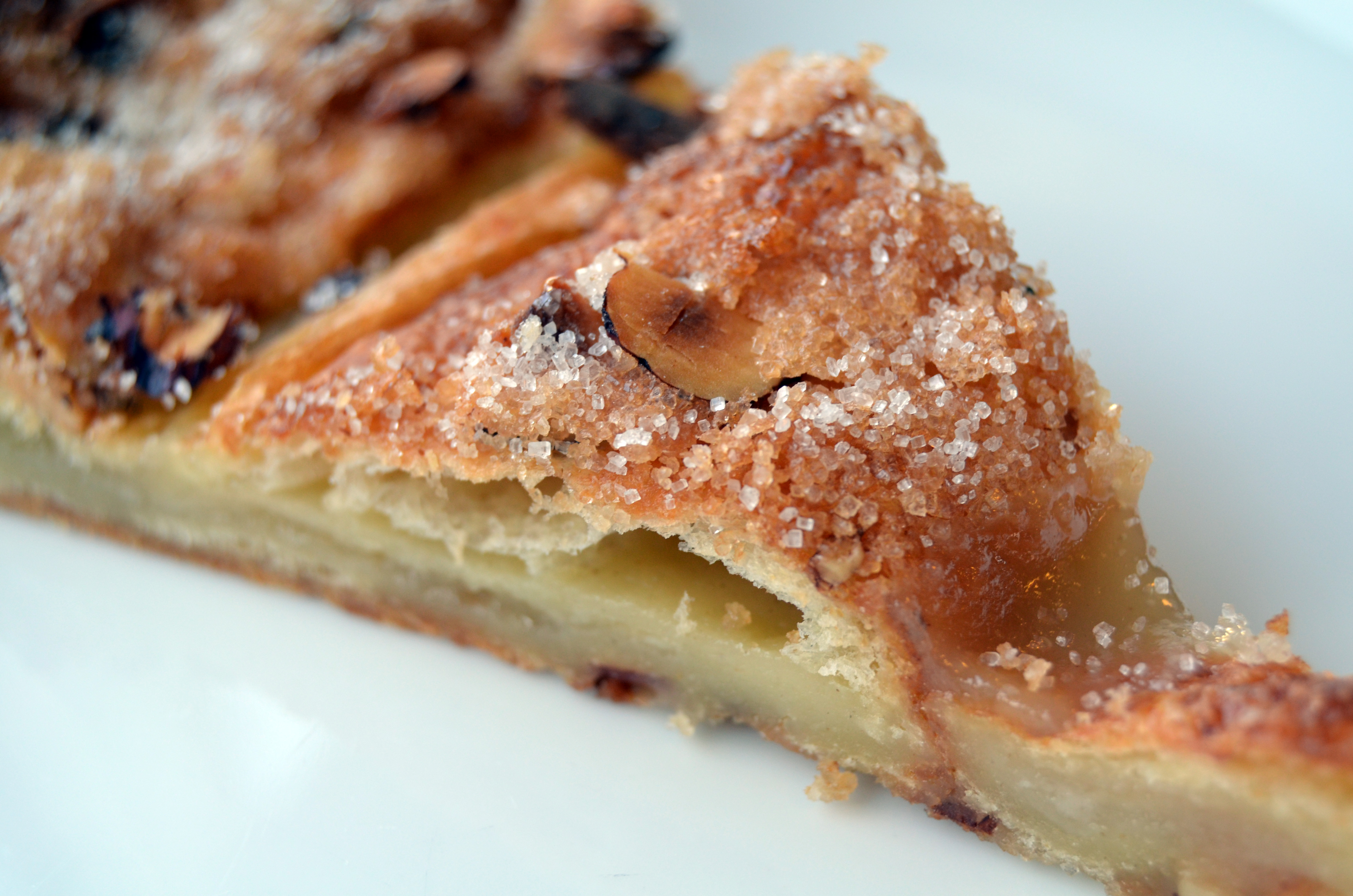
A pastry with a filling of remonce

- Beurre blanc – Emulsified butter sauce
- Beurre fondue – Food prepared by melting butter in water
- Beurre maître d'hôtel – Type of compound butter
- Beurre manié – Thickening agent
- Beurre monté – Melted butter sauce
- Beurre noir – French butter dish
- Beurre noisette – Sauce used in French cuisine
- Bread and butter pudding – Traditional sweet British pudding
- Buttered rice – Burmese butter and lentil rice
- Butter cake – Type of cake
- Butter chicken – Indian curry dish
- Butter cookie – Cookie originating in Denmark
- Butter pecan – Flavor of ice cream, cakes, and cookies
- Butter pie – English savoury pie
- Butter tart – Canadian dessert pastry
- Butter tea – South Asian and Tibetan drink
- Butterbrot – Buttered bread, a German staple food
- Buttercream – Sweet filling made with butter
- Butterkuchen – German butter cake
- Butterscotch – Type of confectionery
- Buttery (bread) – Savoury bread roll originating from Aberdeen, Scotland
- Chicken Kyiv – Chicken dish associated with Russian and Ukrainian cuisines
- Compound butter – Butter mixed with other ingredients, or beurre composé
- Cookie butter – Food paste made from speculoos cookie crumb
- Croissant – Crescent-shaped viennoiserie pastry
- Danish pastry – Multilayered, laminated sweet pastry
- Deep-fried butter – Snack food made of butter
- Egg butter – Butter and hard-boiled egg dish eaten in Finland and Estonia
- Fettuccine Alfredo – Creamy pasta dish with butter and cheese
- Garlic butter – Compound butter, or beurre à la bourguignonne
- Gooey butter cake – Cake originally from St. Louis, Missouri
- Hard sauce – Dessert sauce of sugar, butter, and spirits
- Hollandaise sauce – Sauce made of egg, butter, and lemon
- Karelian pasty – Traditional Karelian food
- Kouign-amann – Breton pastry
- Linzer torte – Austrian pastry
- Pain aux raisins – French pastry
- Pozharsky cutlet – Russian dish of breaded ground meat
- Popcorn – Type of corn kernel which expands and puffs upon heating
- Puff pastry – Light, flaky pastry
- Remonce – Traditional Danish pastry filling
- Torpedo dessert – Bread roll filled with pastry cream
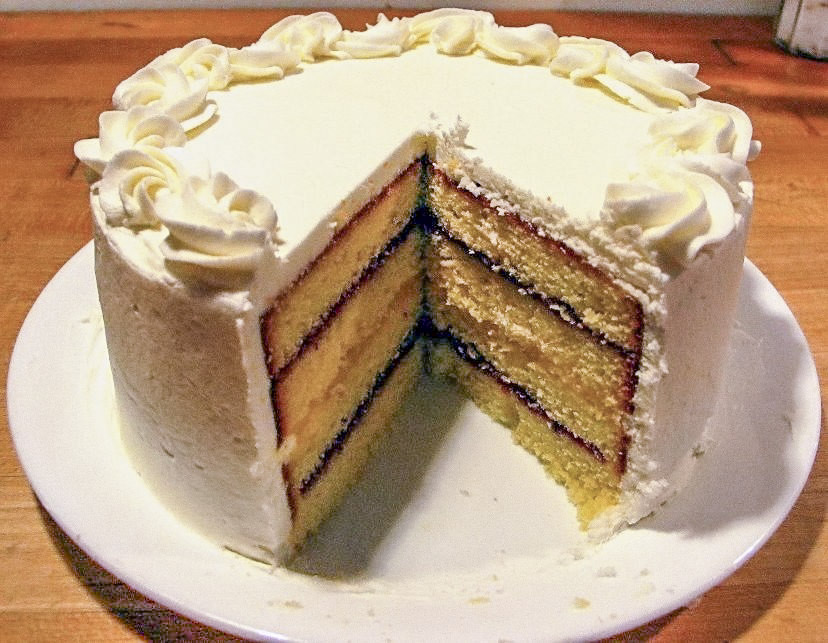
A layer cake with buttercream icing and decorations

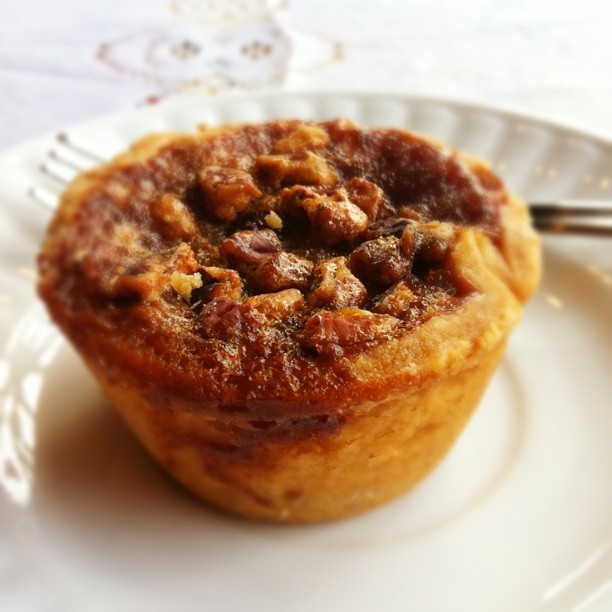
A Butter tart is a type of small pastry tart highly regarded in Canadian cuisine and considered one of Canada's quintessential desserts. The tart consists of butter, sugar, syrup, and egg filled into a flaky pastry and baked until the filling is semi-solid with a crunchy top.

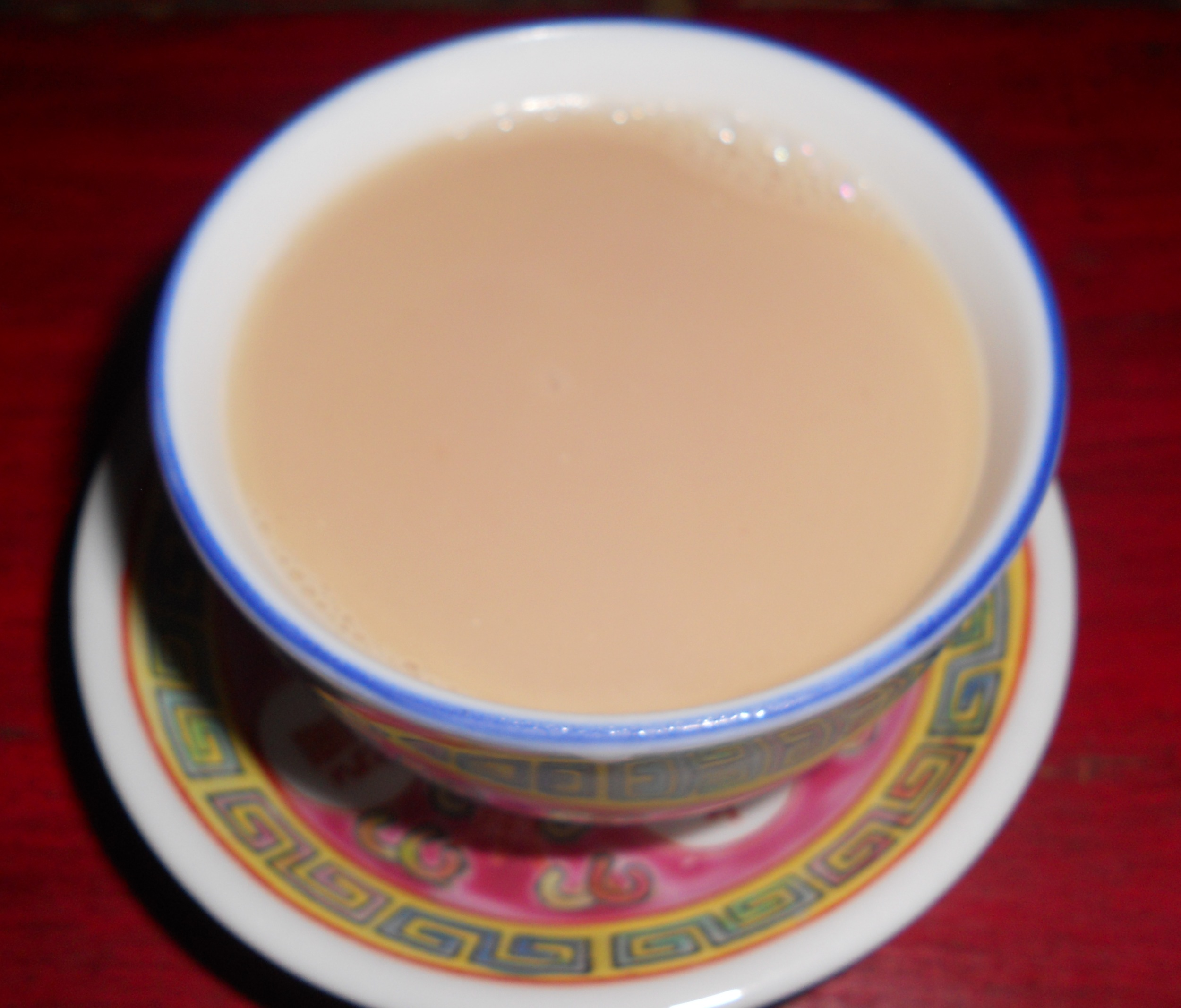
Butter tea is prepared with tea leaves, yak butter, and salt.

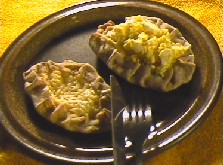
Karelian pasties topped with egg butter

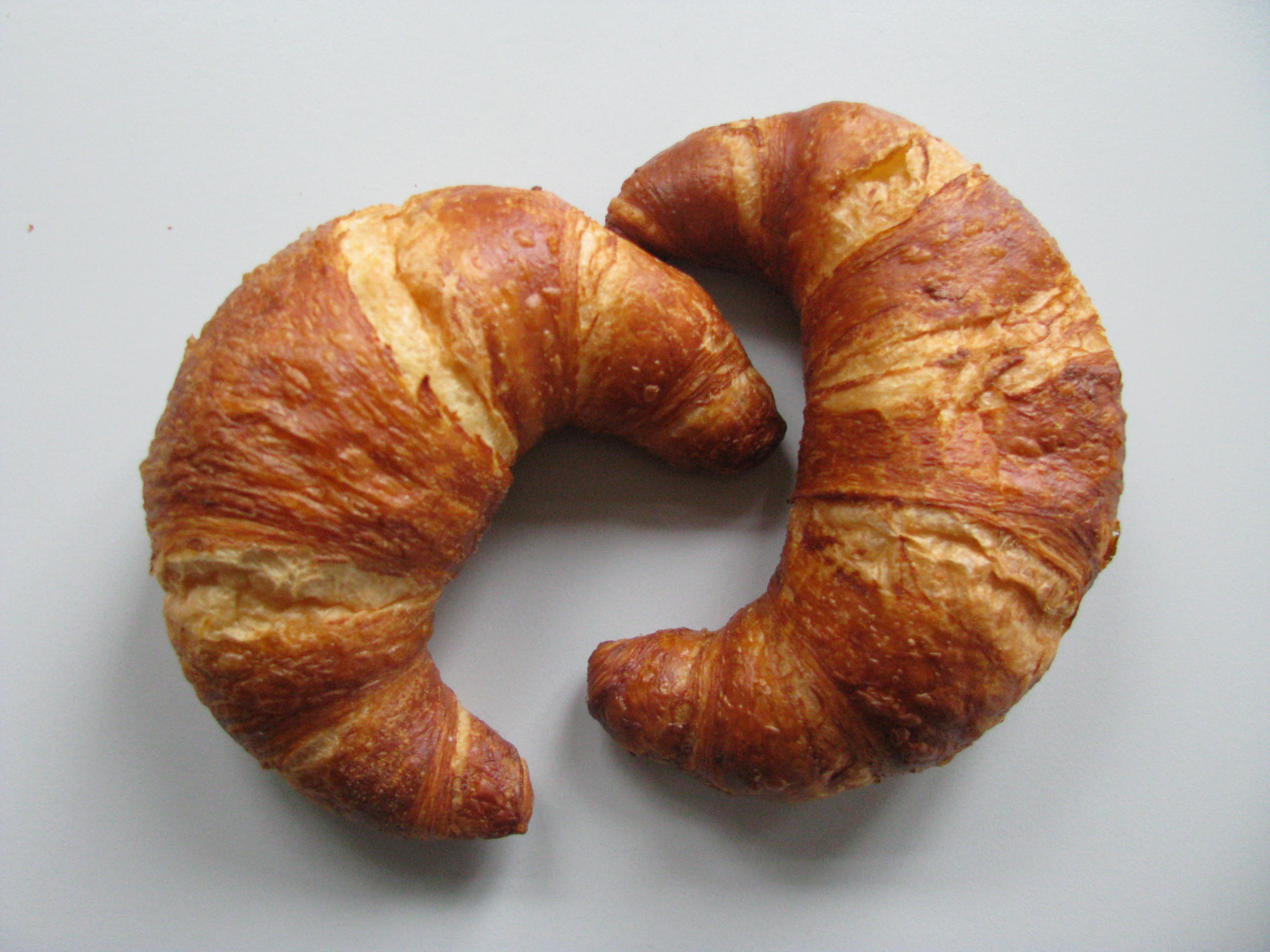
Croissants

== See also ==
- List of dairy products
- List of pastries
- List of spreads
- Mound of Butter (Vollon) – famous painting depicting butter
