= O&H Danish Bakery =

Bakery in Racine, Wisconsin, USA

O&H Danish Bakery is a family-owned bakery founded in 1949 in Racine, Wisconsin, known for its traditional Danish pastry, particularly the kringle. Established by Danish immigrant Christian Olesen, the bakery has remained under the ownership of the Olesen family for four generations.

== History ==
Wisconsin quickly became one of the primary destinations for Danish immigrants in the United States. By 1897 the state was home to approximately 35,000 Danes. Thus the founding of bakeries such as O&H Danish Bakery, Lehmann’s Bakery, and Bendtsen's Bakery in the mid‐20th century fit into a local Danish cultural and entrepreneurial tradition.

The bakery's origins date to 1921, when Anton Olesen emigrated from Denmark to Racine, Wisconsin, seeking better opportunities for his family. After spending two years working in a variety of jobs, he finally had enough money to bring his five children over from Denmark. One of his children, Christian Olesen, began working at a local Danish bakery in Racine, a city often referred to as the "Kringle Capital of the United States".

After dedicating 25 years to mastering the craft, Christian Olesen opened O&H Danish Bakery in 1949. O&H became one of three longstanding original family-run bakeries from the 1930s and 1940s contributing to the city's Danish pastry tradition. Christian's son, Ray Olesen, and Ray's wife, Myrna, took over the business in 1963, expanding its offerings and reach. In 1972, the bakery relocated to a larger building on Douglas Avenue in Racine. In 1982, the family opened a second store on Durand Avenue, also in Racine. The third generation, including Dale, Mike, and Eric Olesen, continued the family tradition. In 2024, Peter Olesen, representing the fourth generation, became company president.

== Products ==
O&H Danish Bakery is known for its kringle, a flaky, oval-shaped pastry filled with sweet fillings. Originally shaped like a pretzel, the design of the O&H Danish Bakery kringle evolved in the 1950s to its current oval form to accommodate customer preferences for more filling. The bakery offers a wide range of kringle flavors, including traditional options and seasonal varieties. Each kringle is handcrafted over three days, resulting in a laminated dough with a delicate, buttery texture. In addition to kringle, O&H Danish Bakery makes other bakery items from scratch daily, including gluten-free items.

== Locations ==
Today, O&H Danish Bakery operates five locations across southeast Wisconsin, including stores in Racine, Sturtevant and Oak Creek. The bakery produces kringles sold through its retail locations, e-commerce, and select national retailers, including Trader Joe’s.

== Ohlaf the Kringle Baker ==
O&H Danish Bakery introduced Ohlaf the Kringle Baker, a Viking baker who serves as the bakery's brand mascot and represents its cultural heritage. The character appears in two children's books authored by Tod Steward and illustrated by Karen Johnson: "Ohlaf the Kringle Baker" and "Ohlaf, the Kringle Baker: The Christmas Gift".

== Recognition ==
In 1955, President Dwight D. Eisenhower and First Lady Mamie Eisenhower received a kringle from the bakery. Mamie praised it as one of their favorite pastries. On June 30, 2010 President Barack Obama stopped by the bakery and called them, "outstanding". In 2013, the kringle was designated the official state pastry of Wisconsin, further highlighting its role in Wisconsin's culinary culture. In 2024, the bakery celebrated its 75th anniversary, marking the occasion with special events and limited reissues of classic kringle flavors from each Olesen generation.

O&H Danish Bakery has been recognized as the "Best Kringle of Racine" in the annual reader survey conducted by the Racine Journal Times for more than a decade.

== See also ==
- Danish cuisine
- Racine Danish Kringles
