= Racine Danish Kringles =

Kringle bakery in Racine, Wisconsin

Racine Danish Kringles is a bakery located in Racine, Wisconsin that specializes in kringles.

== History ==
The bakery opened in 1981 and primarily distributed Kringles through wholesale. Kringles were supplied to grocery stores throughout the Midwest and DSD (Direct Store Delivery) where fresh Kringles were delivered to nearby stores. Kringles were also available to local fundraising groups. In October 1988, Mike and Roylene Heyer officially purchased Racine Danish Kringles. At the time, the business was producing 400,000 Kringles annually and employed about eight people.

In 1994, Heyer introduced his Kringles as a corporate gift at the Tomorrow's Products and Services Exhibit. Heyer's son Christopher took over as president of the company in July 2012.

The bakery also produces Aunt Marie's Cheesecakes, brownies, cinnamon nuns, and cookie dough. Food Network Magazine's December 2013 Holiday Issue included Racine Danish Kringles as the featured food gift from Wisconsin in their "50 States, 50 Food Gifts" article.

Lawmakers designated the Kringle as the official Wisconsin State Pastry on July 1, 2013.

== See also ==
- O&H Danish Bakery
