= Karelian hot pot =

Karelian meat stew

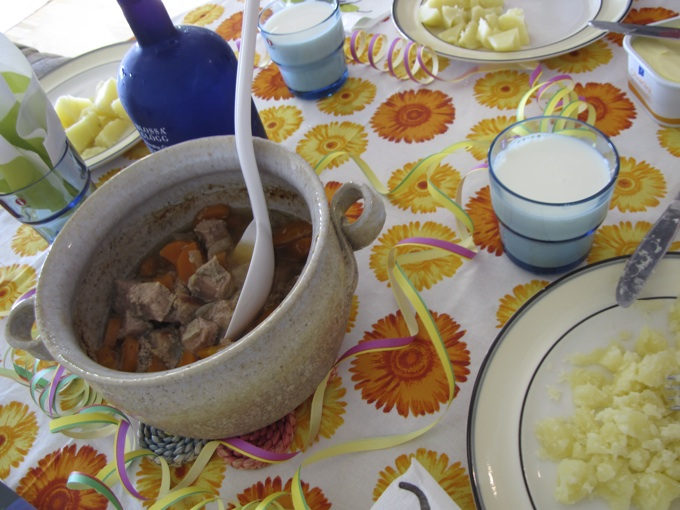
- Alternative names: Karelian stew, päččiliha, karjalanpaisti, karelsk stek
- Type: Stew
- Place of origin: Karelia
- Region or state: Karelia; Finland
- Main ingredients: Meat (pork, beef, or lamb), black peppercorns

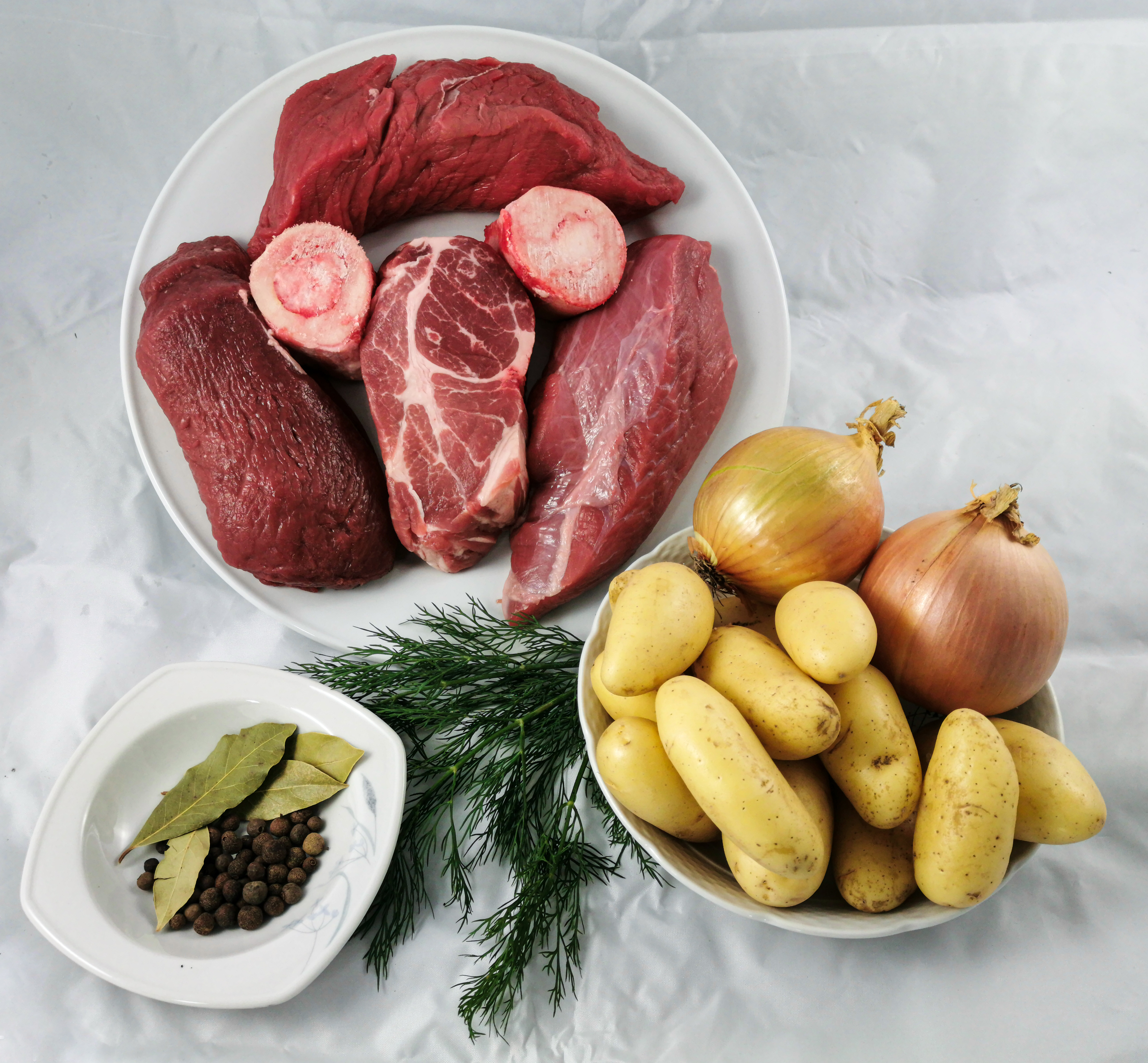
Ingredients for Karelian stew

The Karelian hot pot (British) or Karelian stew (US) (Karelian: päččiliha Karelian pronunciation: [ˈpæt.t͜ɕiˌlʲiɦɑ̝]; Finnish: karjalanpaisti; Swedish: karelsk stek) is a traditional Finnish meat stew originating in the region of Karelia. It is commonly prepared using a combination of pork and beef, but elk or lamb can also be used. Along with the Karelian pasties (šipainiekat, karjalanpiirakat), it is the most widely recognized Karelian food in Finland. In 2007, it was selected as the national dish of Finland by the readers of the Finnish tabloid Iltalehti. In a similar poll organized by the ELO Foundation for the Promotion of Finnish Food Culture in cooperation with the Central Union of Agricultural Producers and Forest Owners (MTK) and the Finnish Ministry of Agriculture and Forestry in autumn 2016, Karelian hot pot took second place, losing to rye bread.

The hot pot is typically seasoned with black peppercorns, salt, bay leaves and allspice. Common vegetables such as carrots, onions, and root vegetables are acceptable additions to the stew.

Like most other Karelian foods, the Karelian hot pot is traditionally braised (cooked in a pot (uuniruukku or pata in Finnish) placed inside an oven). In Finnish-speaking Karelia, it is usually referred to as merely 'stew' (paisti) or 'oven stew' (uunipaisti). The term Karelian hot pot can be used to refer to nearly any food that contains meat and that is prepared in this traditional Karelian fashion.

Due to the scarcity of meat in the past, the hot pot was traditionally prepared only for festive occasions. As meat became more readily available during the 20th century, the dish became a common, everyday food throughout Finland.

== See also ==
- List of stews
