= Karelian pasty =

Traditional Karelian food

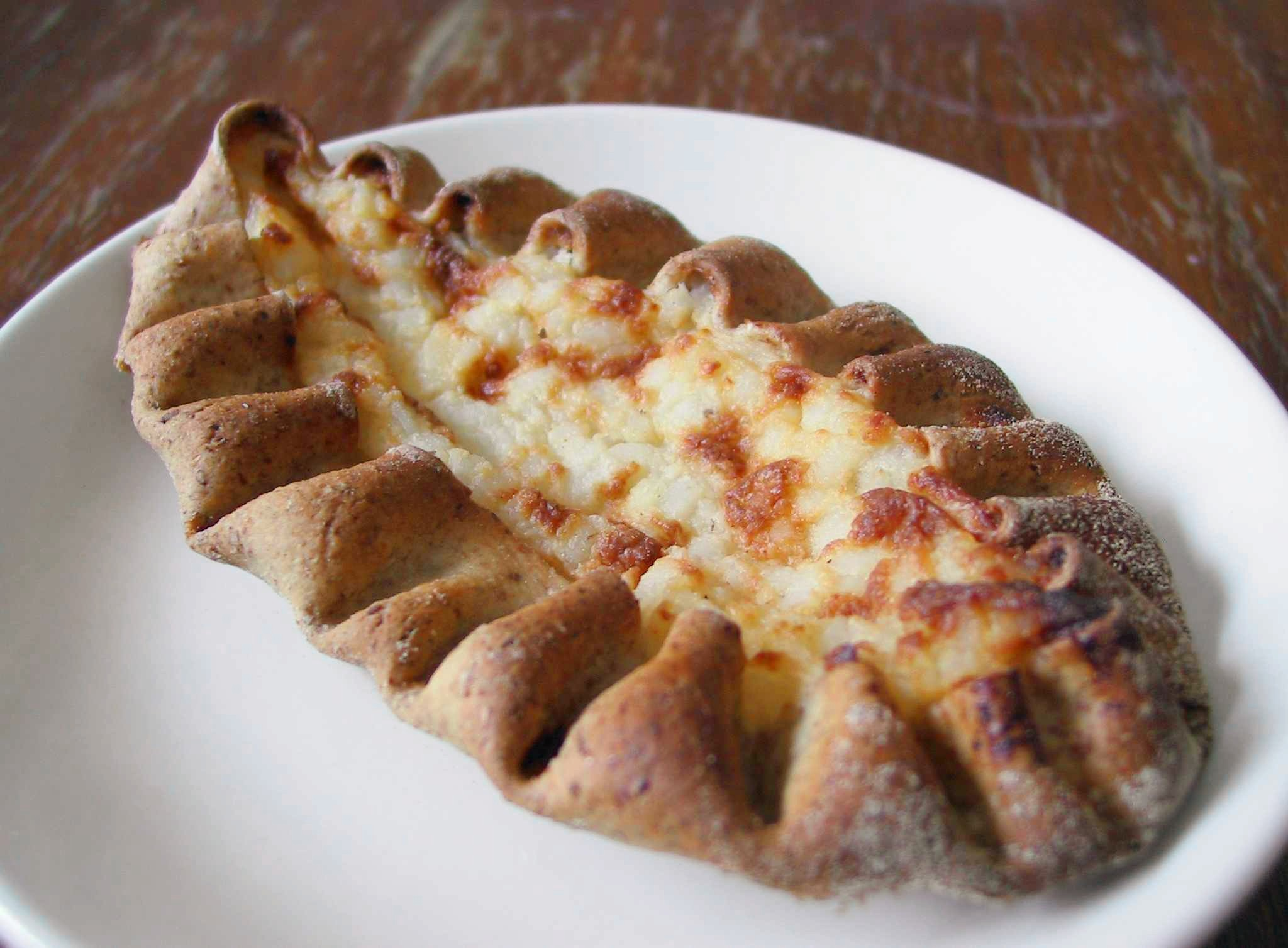
- A store-bought Karelian pasty
- Type: Pasty, pirog
- Place of origin: Karelia
- Region or state: Karelia; Finland
- Main ingredients: rye flour or wheat flour, rice or potatoes, butter

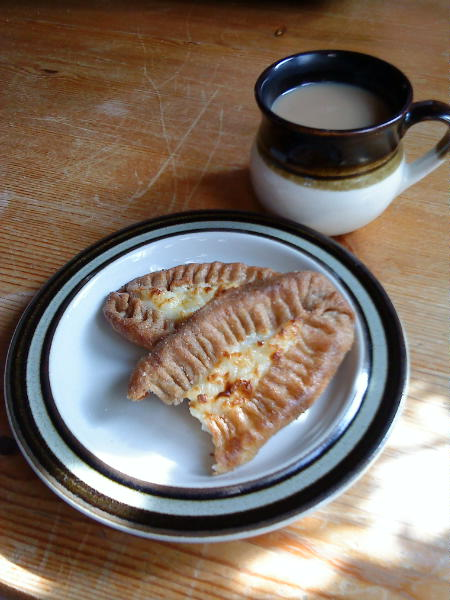
Karelian pasties made in Vaivio, Liperi

Karelian pasties, Karelian pies or Karelian pirogs (Karelian: kalitat, singular kalitta Karelian pronunciation: [ˈkɑlʲitːɑ]; Livvi-Karelian: šipainiekat, singular šipainiekku Livvi pronunciation: [ˈʃipɑi̯ˌnʲie̯kːu]; Finnish: karjalanpiirakat, singular karjalanpiirakka [ˈkɑrjɑlɑnˌpiːrɑkːɑ]) are traditional Finnish pasties or pirogs originating from the region of Karelia. They are eaten throughout Finland as well as in adjacent areas such as Estonia and Russian Karelia.

The oldest traditional pasties usually had a rye crust, but the North Karelian and Ladoga Karelian variants also contained wheat to improve the quality of the crust. The usual fillings were barley and talkkuna. In the 19th century, first potato, and then buckwheat were introduced as fillings, and later, boiled rice and millet.

Today, the most popular version has a thin rye crust with a filling of rice. Mashed potato and rice-and-carrot fillings are also commonly available. Butter, often mixed with chopped-up boiled egg (egg butter or munavoi), is spread over the hot pasties before eating.

Karelian pasties have had traditional speciality guaranteed (TSG) status in Europe since 2003. This means that any producer not following the traditional recipe cannot call them karjalanpiirakka and instead, will have to call them riisipiirakka 'rice pasties', perunapiirakka 'potato pasties', etc., depending on the filling.

== See also ==
- Finnish cuisine
- Karelian hot pot
- Kalakukko
- Cornish pasty
- List of butter dishes
- List of pastries
- Ruisreikäleipä
- Bread cheese
- Lihapiirakka
- Mämmi
