= Egg butter =

Butter and hard-boiled egg dish eaten in Finland and Estonia

Mashed eggs
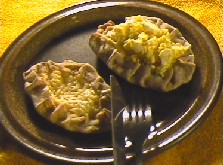
- Karelian pasties topped with egg butter
- Alternative names: Munavoi
- Type: Spread
- Place of origin: Finland
- Region or state: Northern Europe
- Main ingredients: Butter and chopped hard-boiled eggs
- Ingredients generally used: Salt

Egg butter (Finnish: munavoi, Estonian: munavõi, Karelian: jäiččävoi, Livvi: jäiččyvoi, Norwegian: eggesmør) is a mixture of butter and chopped hard-boiled eggs. It is a well known spread in Finnish cuisine and Estonian cuisine.

In Finland, egg butter is typically spread over hot Karelian pasties. In Estonia, egg butter and leib (dark rye bread) are traditionally included in the Easter Sunday meal.

== See also ==
- List of butter dishes
- List of pastries
- List of spreads
