= Remonce =

Traditional Danish pastry filling

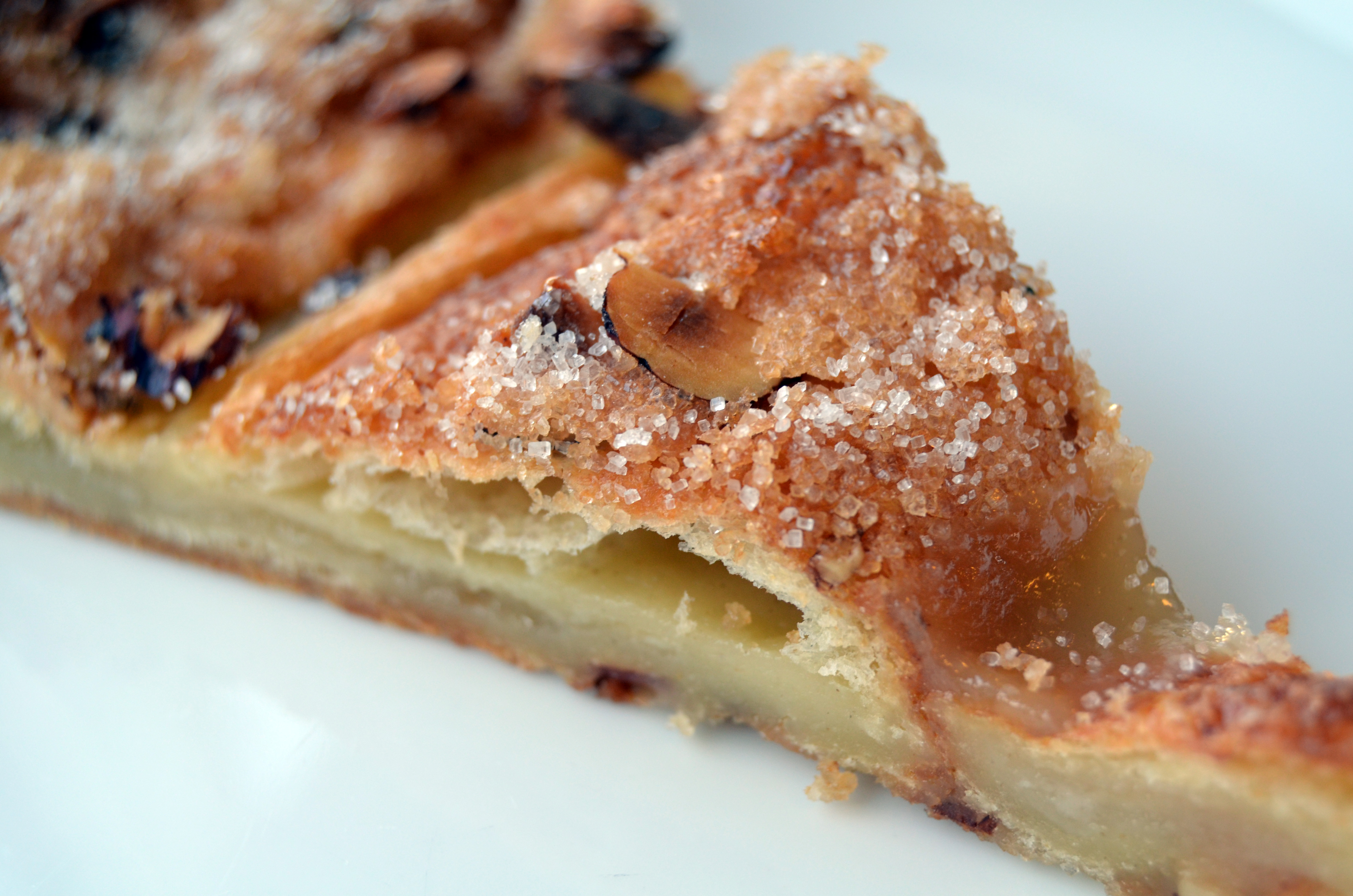
- A cut piece of Danish pastry (Kringle). The slightly yellowish remonce spread shows clearly inside the cake.
- Type: Pastry
- Place of origin: Denmark
- Main ingredients: Butter and sugar

Remonce is a cake-filling paste used in various traditional Danish pastries. It is made by creaming softened butter with sugar, and is sometimes flavoured with cinnamon (e.g. in cinnamon snails), cardamom, custard, marzipan, or almond paste. Remonce is always baked along with the pastry.

Remonce is a Danish word and invention. In the English language it has been referred to as "Lord Mayor filling".

== See also ==
- List of pastries
- List of butter dishes
