= Butterbrot =

Buttered bread, a German staple food

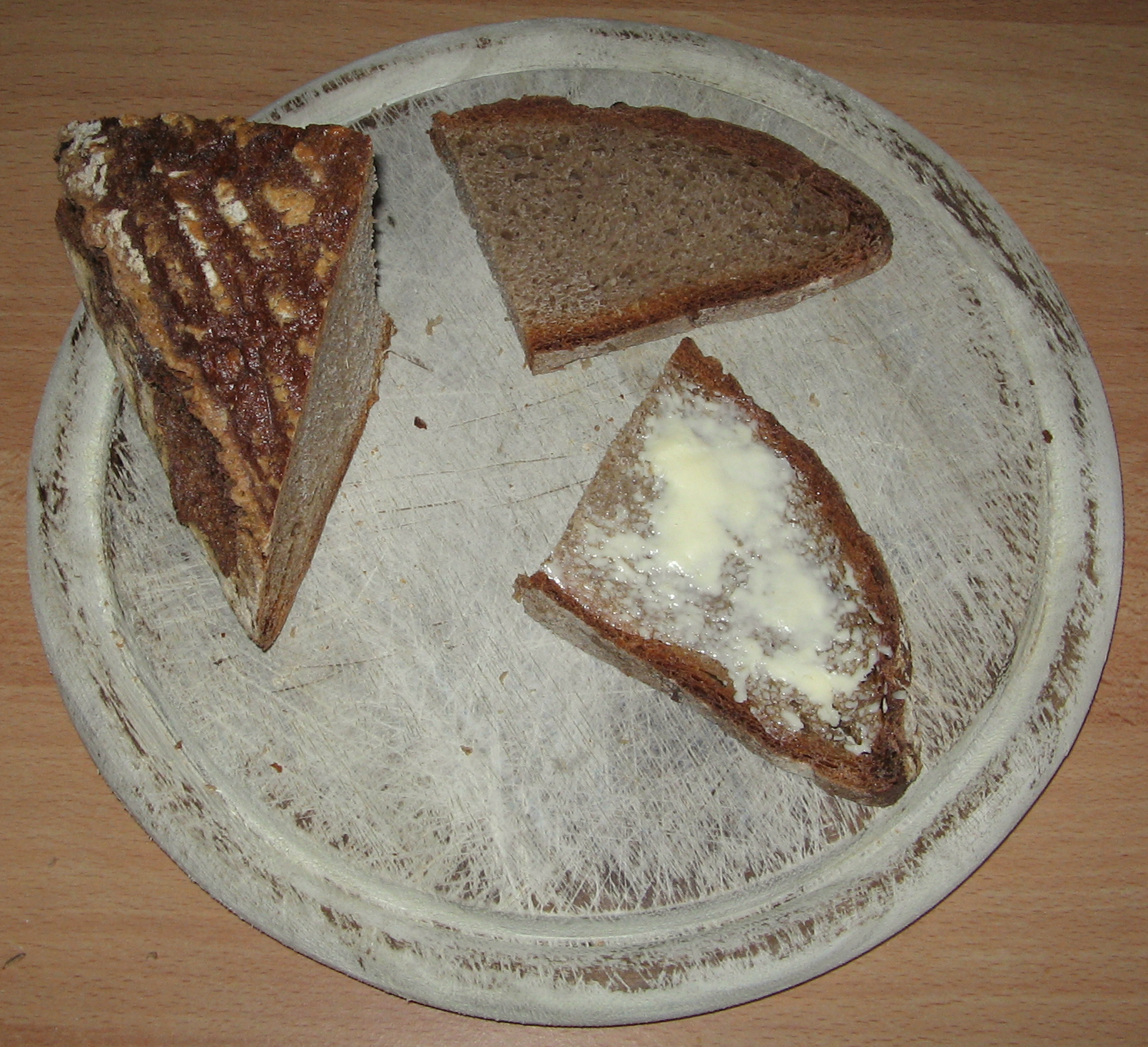
- Type: Sandwich
- Place of origin: Germany
- Main ingredients: Bread, butter

In German cuisine, Butterbrot (literally: butter bread = bread with butter) is a slice of bread topped with butter. Also known as boterham in Dutch speaking countries, it is still considered Butterbrot or boterham even if additional toppings, such as cheese, spreads, or lunch meats, are added, as long as it begins with a slice of bread with butter.

The words in formal and colloquial German and the different dialects for butterbrot (different from belegtes Brot - with cheese, sausages etc.), simply Brot ("bread"), Butterstulle, Stulle, Schnitte (all three Low German/Berlinerisch dialect), Botteramm (Colognian dialect, cf. Dutch boterham), Bütterken (Lower Rhine dialect) to Bemme (Upper Saxon German) or Knifte (Ruhrdeutsch). Although it is increasingly replaced by other foods, it remains a common staple food in Germany. Since 1999, the last Friday in the month of September was made the Day of German Butterbrot by the Marketing Organization of German Agricultural Industries.

The Russian language adopted the term buterbrod (бутерброд) from New High German (Butterbrot), perhaps as early as the 18th century during the reign of Peter the Great. In modern Russian the term has a more general meaning, whatever the ingredient on top of the slice of bread is. From Russian, the term buterbrod was adopted into Azerbaijani, Belarusian, Georgian, Kazakh and Ukrainian.

== Comparison with sandwiches ==
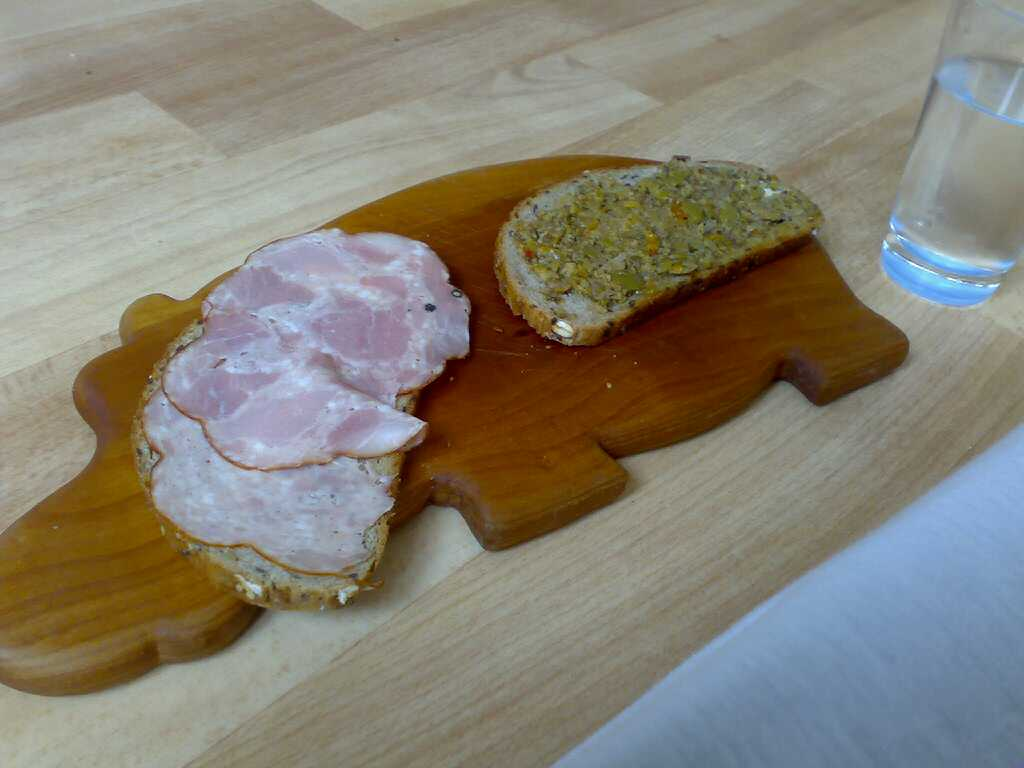
Butterbrot with ham slices and bruschetta sitting atop a hippopotamus-shaped cutting board

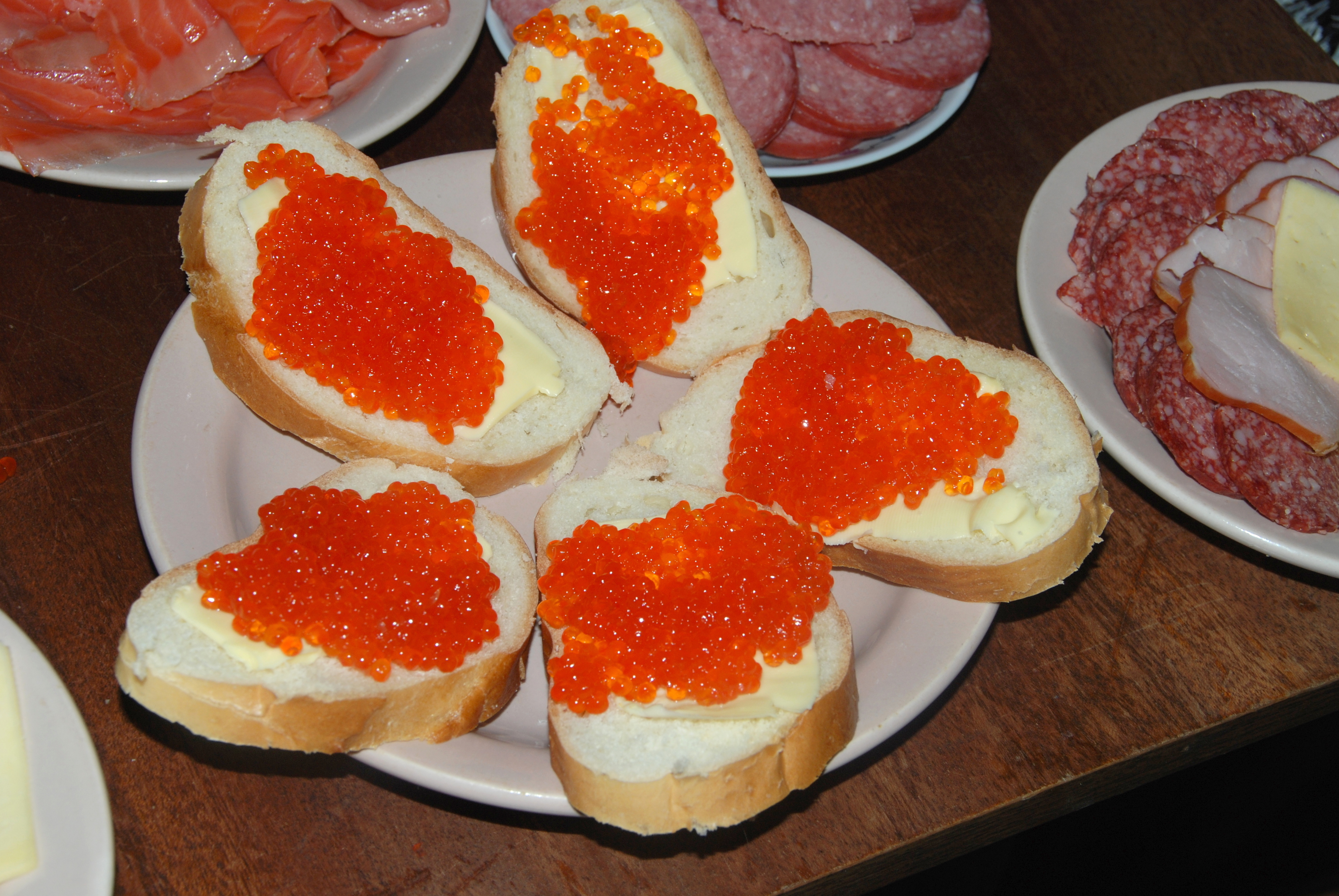
Salmon roe buterbrod, typical Russian zakuski

A Butterbrot is commonly a single slice of bread and one ingredient on top of the butter or margarine. For breakfast, this ingredient tends to be sweet and can be marmalade, jam, honey, chocolate spread, hazelnut spread, or the less common peanut butter. For dinner or as boxed lunch, and often also for breakfast, the Butterbrot is eaten with something savoury on top, usually a large slice of cold meat or cheese or sliced German Wurst, or one of the dozens of available cream cheese varieties, or an entire Schnitzel or halved minced meat patty, or hard-boiled egg slices or egg salad, or other spreadable creamy salads, or smoked salmon, or various savoury spreads like liverwurst, including also a wide range of vegetarian spreads. Boxed lunch Butterbrot can be folded for easier handling, and as such resembles the sandwich. In Austria Butterbrot only refers to a slice of bread with butter. If a topping is added it is named after the topping (for example, Käsebrot, 'cheese bread'; Wurstbrot, 'sausage bread').

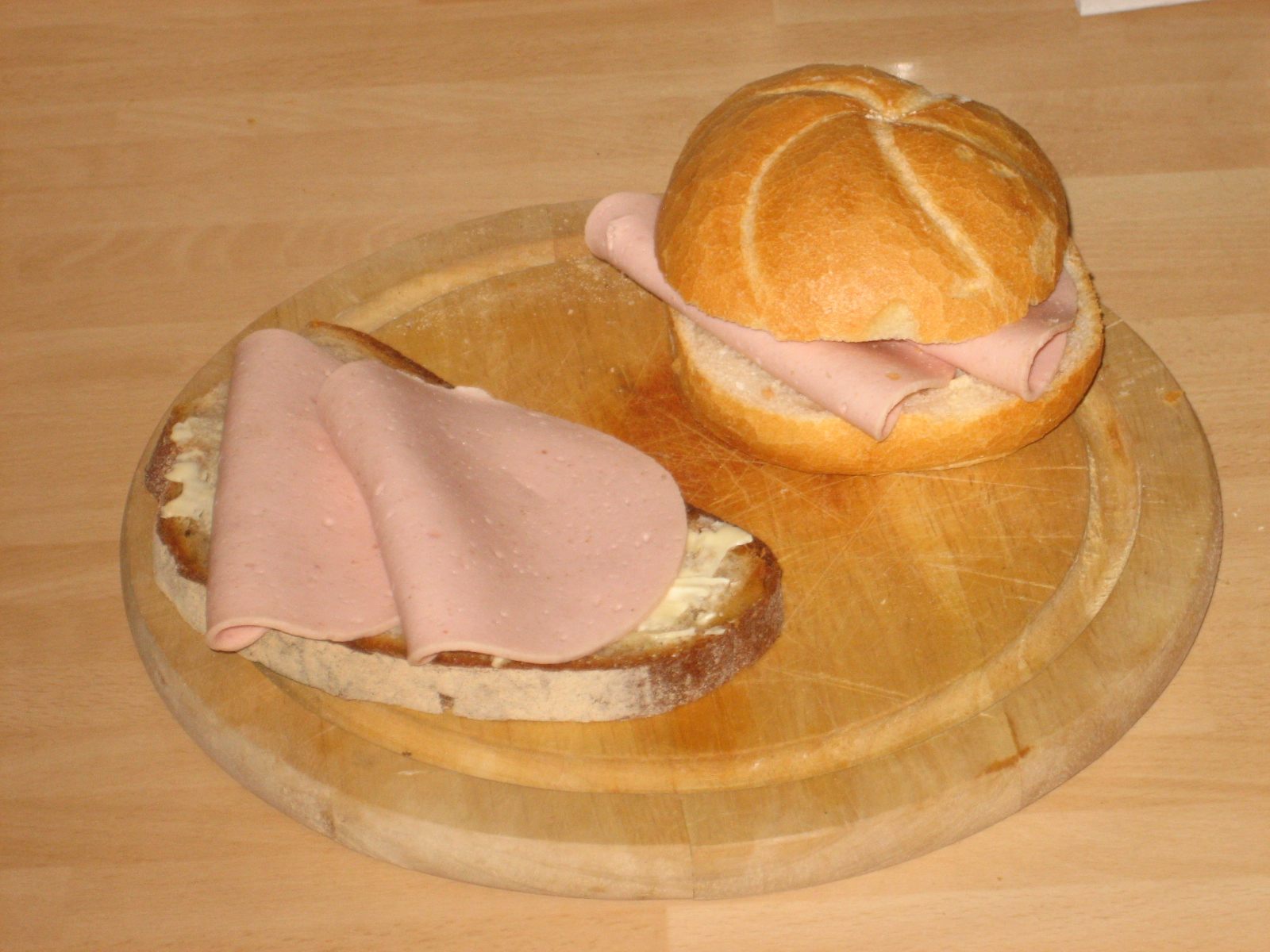
Wurstbrot and Wurstbrötchen

The derivatives of the British sandwich and the Butterbrot of the German-speaking countries differ in some ways: Butterbrot is usually made from the typical bread types of German-speaking countries, which are much firmer and fuller in taste, and with a crispy crust, compared to English sandwich slices. One common type is Vollkornbrot (wholegrain bread), which has a sourish full savoury taste due to the use of sourdough as a leavening agent, and which often contains rye, although bread made from wheat flour is usually the most common variety. Vollkornbrot exists in dozens of varieties with respect to taste, shape, color, and other characteristics. However, white or mixed breads like baguettes or ciabatta are so common they are sold in every supermarket, as are Brötchen (bread rolls), of which countless varieties exist.

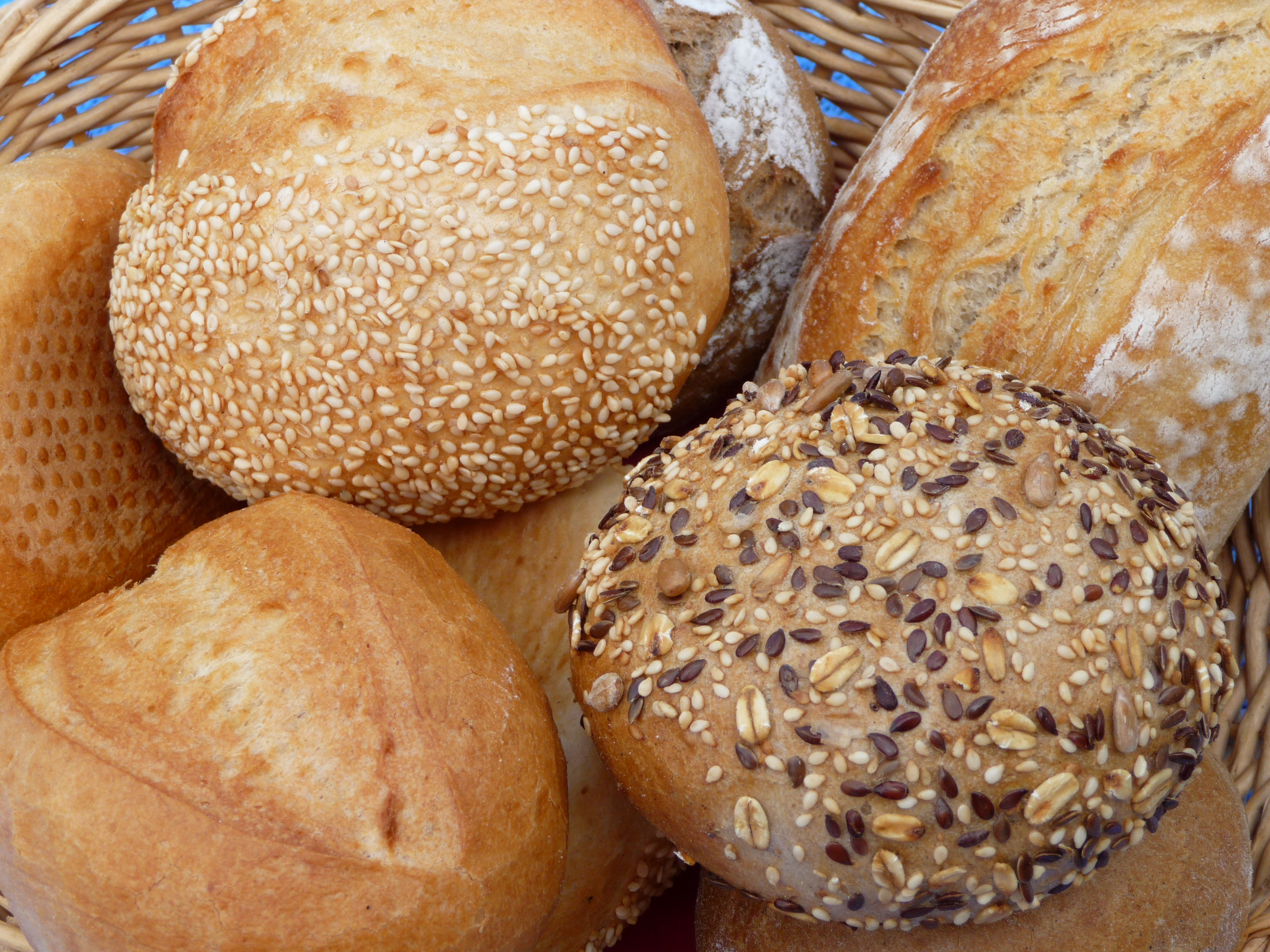
Some of the varieties of Brötchen in Germany

Likely even more important are differences with respect to what is eaten on top of a Butterbrot or in a sandwich. Although exceptions exist, a Butterbrot is commonly not expanded the way sandwiches are. One slice of cheese and one or (in case of thin slices) maybe two slices of cold meat are commonly considered sufficient; adding lettuce, tomato, pickles, onions, mustard, mayonnaise etc. happens only following individual preferences. Also the ratio of bread and "topping" is relatively constant, thick fancy sandwich fillings have almost no equivalent for the Butterbrot.

German speakers differentiate between the German-style Butterbrot and the British-style sandwich by using the English word "sandwich" for the latter.

== Present-day use ==
In German-speaking countries, the Butterbrot has been displaced gradually in the last 40 years by muesli, breakfast cereals or toast for breakfast and take-away bakery products during daytime.

Nonetheless, it remains a common staple food among many Germans. In addition it remains popular in the evening. It is also eaten a lot on hiking trips. In many parts of Germany the Butterbrot is still very common for second breakfast at school or work, much more common than, for example, fast food.

Usually in September every year, the Central Marketing Society for German Agriculture (CMA, the agricultural industry's now-defunct lobby group) used to declare a "day of the German Butterbrot". The 8th Butterbrot Day's motto in 2006 was "Re-Experience Enjoyment". The celebration was one of many "days of" and not very well known in Germany.

In Russia, Ukraine, Belarus, and other former Soviet republics, the buterbrod word has not experienced any decline. It is usually distinguished from "sandwich". In the Russian language, the term сэндвич (sandwich) has not been adopted as widely; it has not been in use as long as buterbrod.

- Normally, сэндвич Runglish-y word for sandwich is used in Russian for two slices of bread with some ingredients in between, and the very word "sandwich" implies "flat X between two flat Y" idea in Runglish (see "сэндвич-панель").
- However, open sandwich is a "бутерброд" for a Russian.

== Urban legends ==
Butterbrot is said to always fall to the floor (and especially on carpet) with the buttered side downwards; an example of Murphy's law. A common explanation is that the top side is usually heavier than the bottom side, particularly if the bread has additional toppings such as a spread. Another is tied to the common height of tables. The subject has been researched by various sources, including the German children's series Die Sendung mit der Maus, and the scientific German TV series Quarks & Co.

It is often joked about what would happen if butterbrot was tied to the back of a cat, in the same manner that hypothetical buttered toast attached to the back of a cat is sometimes joked about, with it being debated whether the cat would still honour the popular axiom that a cat "always lands on its feet", or if the Butterbrot would be "stronger", making the cat fall on its back—alternatively, it is sometimes humorously suggested that the cat would simply levitate, as it would be unable to satisfy both criteria for landing.

== See also ==
- List of butter dishes
- List of sandwiches
- Open sandwich
- Toast (food)
