= Danish pastry =

Multilayered, laminated sweet pastry

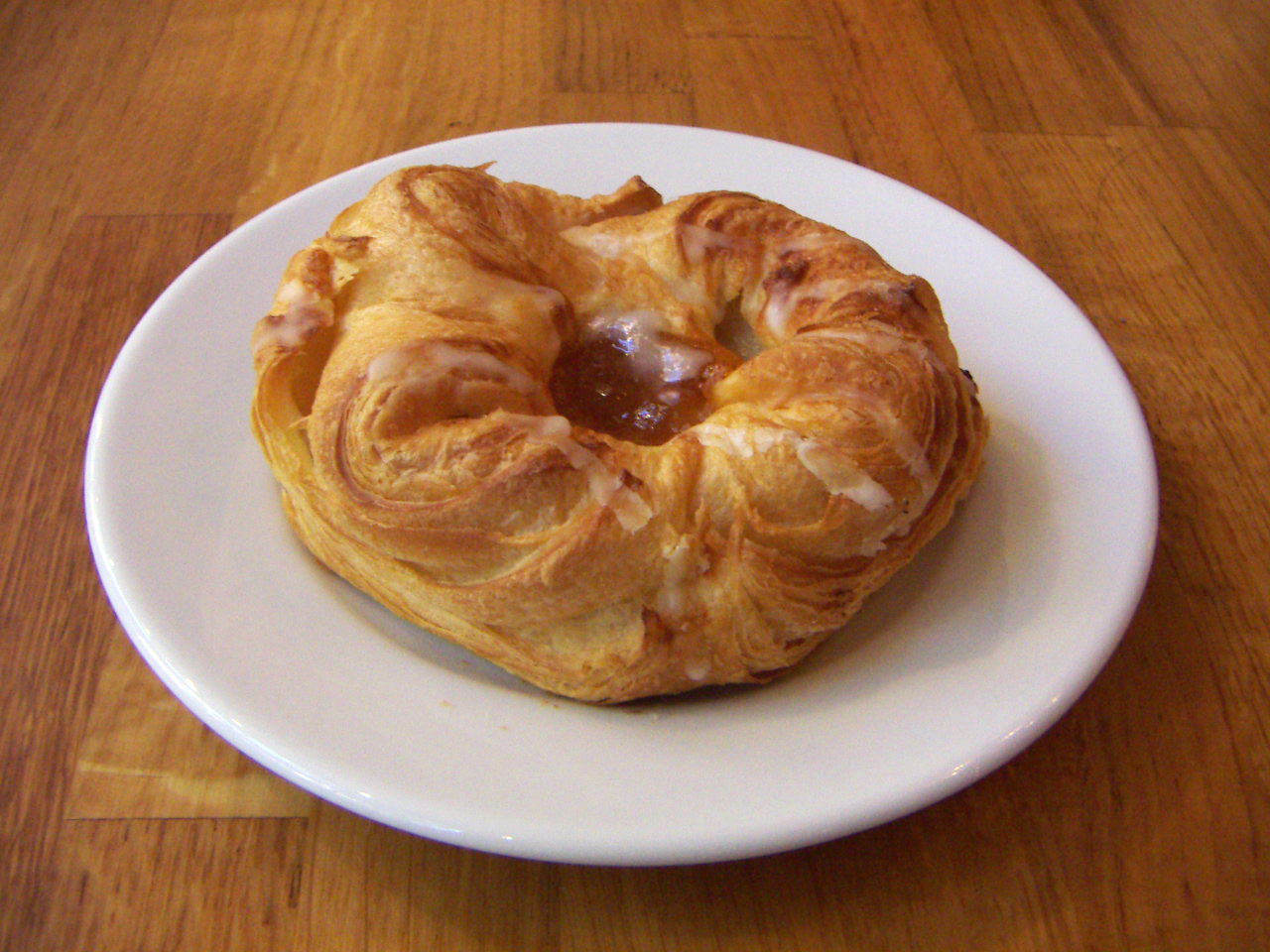
- A typical Spandauer-type Danish with apple filling and glazing
- Alternative names: wienerbrød (Danish); Kopenhagener Plunder, Dänischer Plunder (Austrian German)
- Type: Viennoiserie
- Place of origin: Denmark; Austria
- Main ingredients: wheat flour, butter, milk, eggs, yeast

A Danish pastry (sometimes shortened to Danish; Danish: wienerbrød [ˈviˀnɐˌpʁœðˀ], lit. 'Viennese bread') is a multilayered, laminated sweet viennoiserie. Like other viennoiserie, such as croissants, it is neither a bread nor a pastry, as it uses yeast-leavened dough, that is laminated like puff pastry to create a layered texture.

It is thought that some bakery techniques were brought to Denmark by Austrian bakers, and originated the name of this product. The Danish recipe is however different from the Viennese one and has since developed into a Danish specialty. The origin of the product itself is also not clear.

Danish pastries were brought with immigrants to the United States, where they are often topped with a fruit or cream cheese filling, and are now popular around the world.

== Name ==
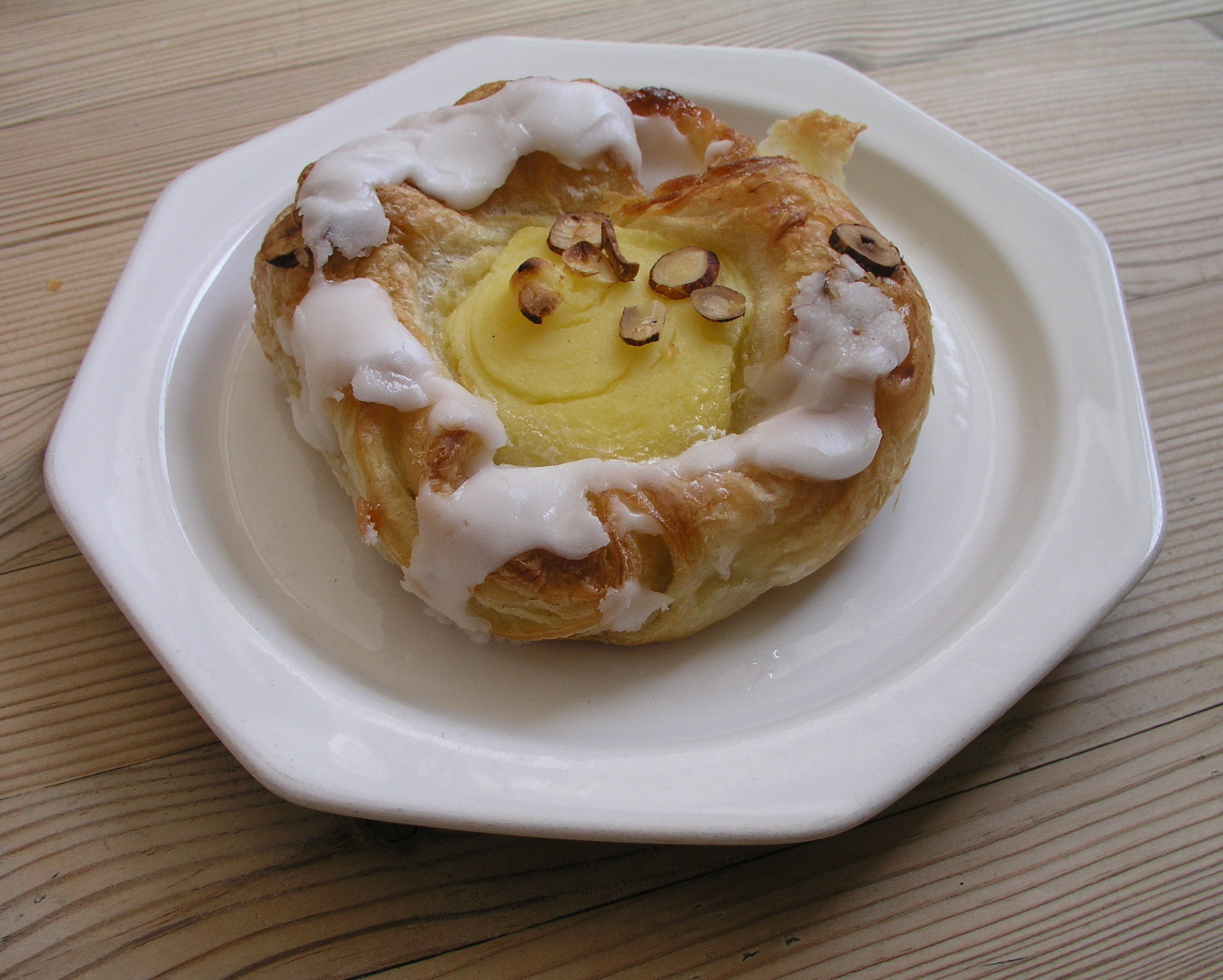
A common version of the pastry in Denmark, Norway, Finland, and Sweden

In Danish, Norwegian, and Swedish, the term for Danish pastry is wienerbrød (or wienerbröd), meaning 'Viennese bread'. The same etymology is also the origin of the Icelandic vínarbrauð, Faroese vinarbreyð, Finnish viineri and Estonian Viini sai ('Viennese pastry').

In Austria and Bavaria, conversely, the Danish pastry is known as Kopenhagener Plunder (or simply Kopenhagener, after Copenhagen) or Dänischer Plunder.

== Composition ==
Danish pastry is made of yeast-leavened dough (known as a viennoiserie) of wheat flour, milk, eggs, sugar, and large amounts of butter or margarine.

A yeast dough is rolled out thinly, covered with thin slices of butter between the layers of dough, and then the dough is folded and rolled several times, creating 27 layers. If necessary, the dough is chilled between foldings to ease handling. The process of rolling, buttering, folding, and chilling is repeated multiple times to create a multilayered dough that becomes airy and crispy on the outside, but also rich and buttery.

Butter is the traditional fat used in Danish pastry, but in industrial production, less expensive fats are often used, such as hydrogenated sunflower oil.

== History ==
The origin of the Danish pastry is often ascribed to a strike amongst bakery workers in Denmark in 1850. The strike caused bakery owners to hire workers from abroad, among them several Austrian bakers, who brought along new baking traditions and recipes. The Austrian pastry of Plunderteig soon became popular in Denmark and after the labour disputes ended, Danish bakers adopted the Austrian recipes, such as the ancestor of the center-filled Danish pastry, the Kolatsche, adjusting them to their own liking and traditions by increasing the amount of egg and fat for example. This development resulted in what is now known as the Danish pastry.

One of the baking techniques and traditions that the Austrian bakers reportedly brought with them was the Viennese lamination technique. Due to such novelties the Danes called the pastry wienerbrød and that name is still in use in Northern Europe today. At that time, almost all baked goods in Denmark were given exotic names.

== Consumption ==
=== In Denmark ===
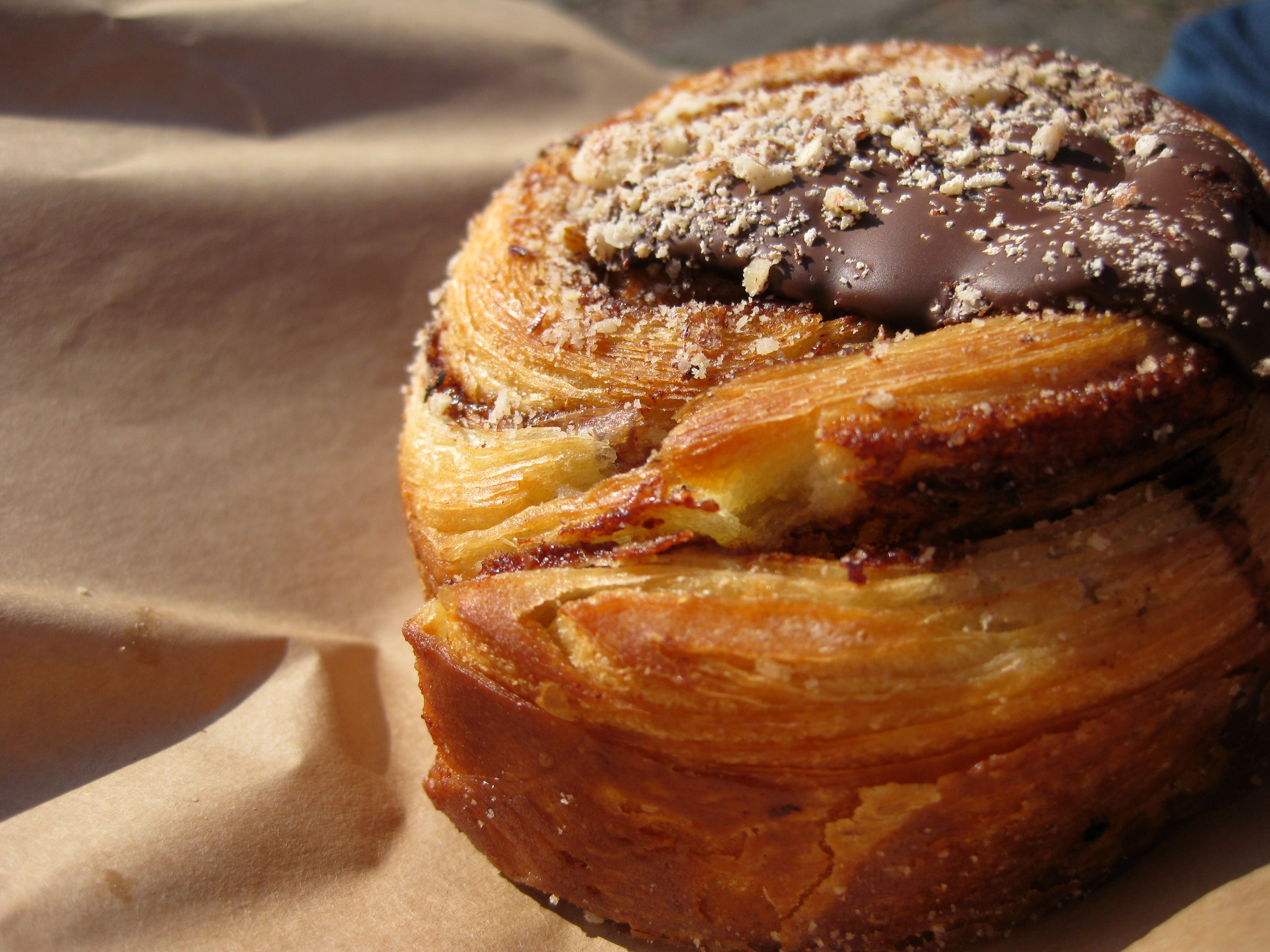
A cinnamon Danish with chocolate and nuts from a bakery in Denmark

Danish pastries as consumed in Denmark have different shapes, sizes, and names. Some are topped with chocolate, pearl sugar, glacé icing, and/or slivered nuts and they may be stuffed with a variety of ingredients such as jam or preserves (usually apple or prune), remonce, marzipan, and/or custard. Shapes are numerous, including circles with filling in the middle (known in Denmark as Spandauers), figure-eights, spirals (known as snails), and huge pretzel-like kringles. There is also the frøsnapper, which is a twisted pastry sprinkled with sesame and poppy seeds. The pastry is often filled with marzipan or custard.

Danish pastries of all variations have come to symbolize hygge, a significant concept of Danish culture that embodies a sense of coziness and comfort.

=== Elsewhere ===
In Finland, Sweden, and Norway, Danish pastry is typically made in the Spandauer-style, often with vanilla custard.

In the UK, various ingredients such as jam, custard, apricots, cherries, raisins, flaked almonds, pecans, or caramelized toffee are placed on or within sections of divided dough, which is then baked. Cardamom is often added to enhance the aroma.

In Sweden, Danishes with nuts on them are popular, where often icing, and, sometimes, powdered sugar and chocolate spritzing are also added.

In Argentina, they are usually filled with dulce de leche or dulce de membrillo.

Danish pastry in different countries

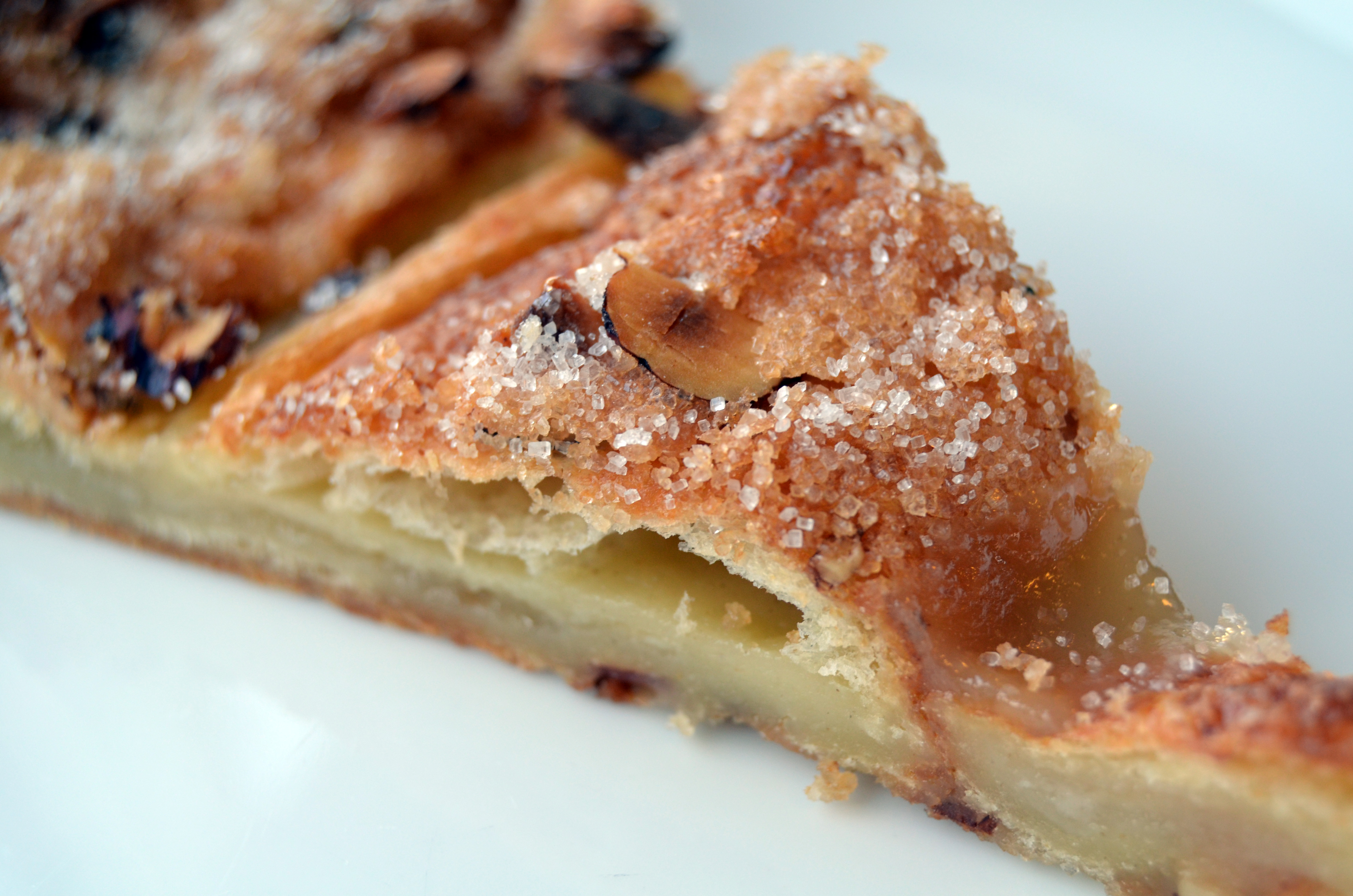
A slice of a kringle with remonce, a type of Danish pastry common in Denmark

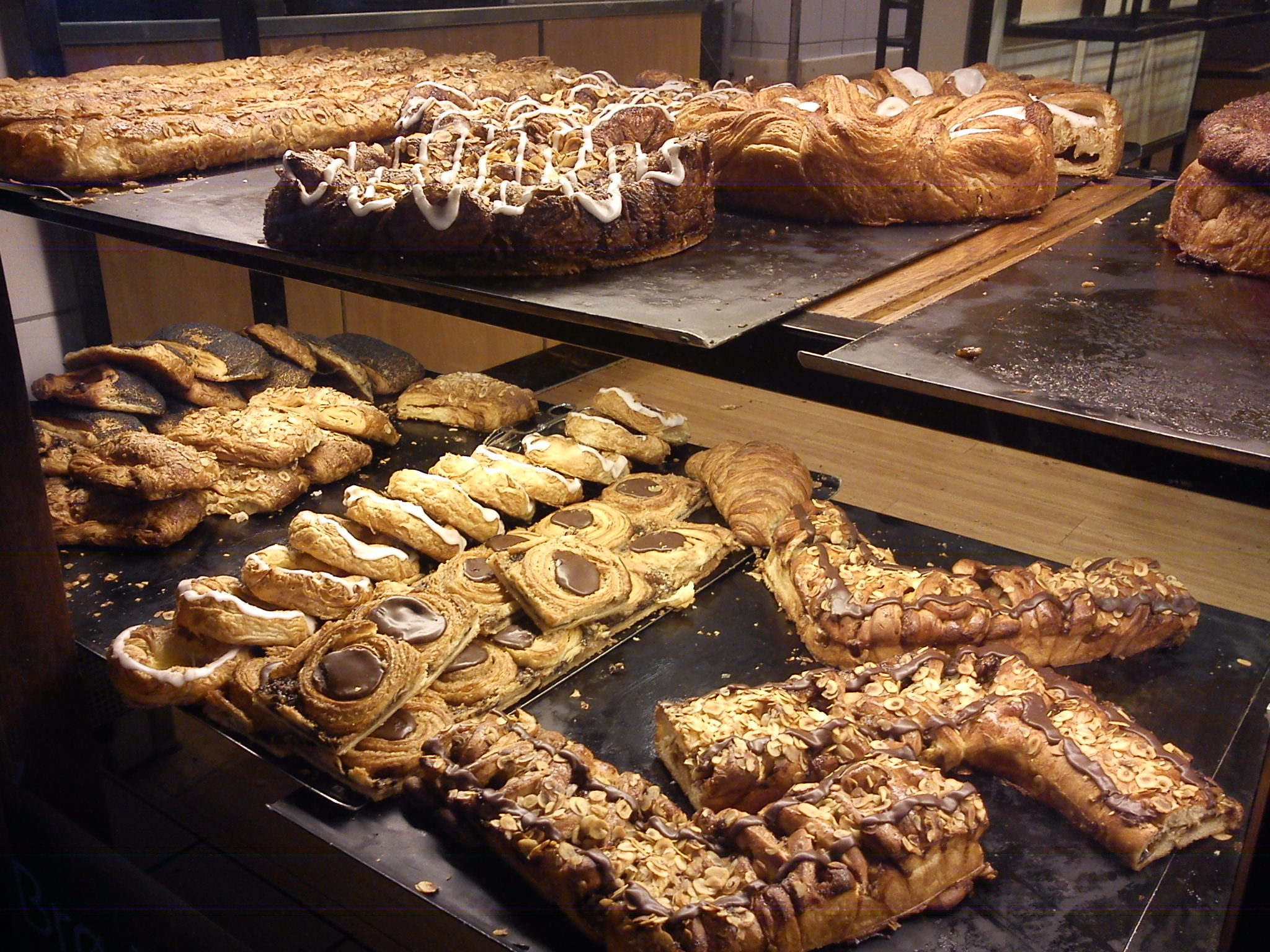
Several types of Danish pastry in a bakery in Denmark

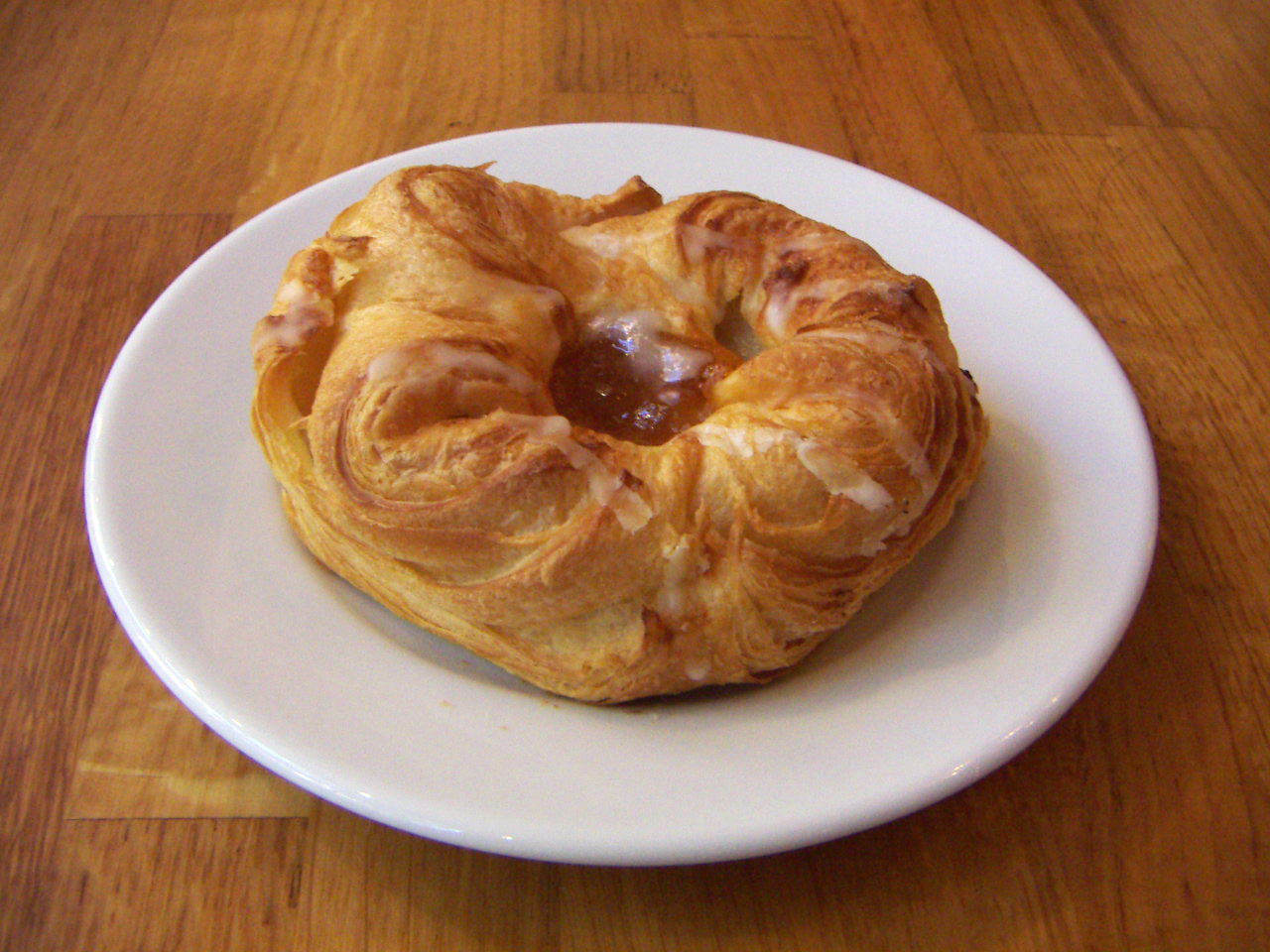
A glazed apple Danish in Sweden

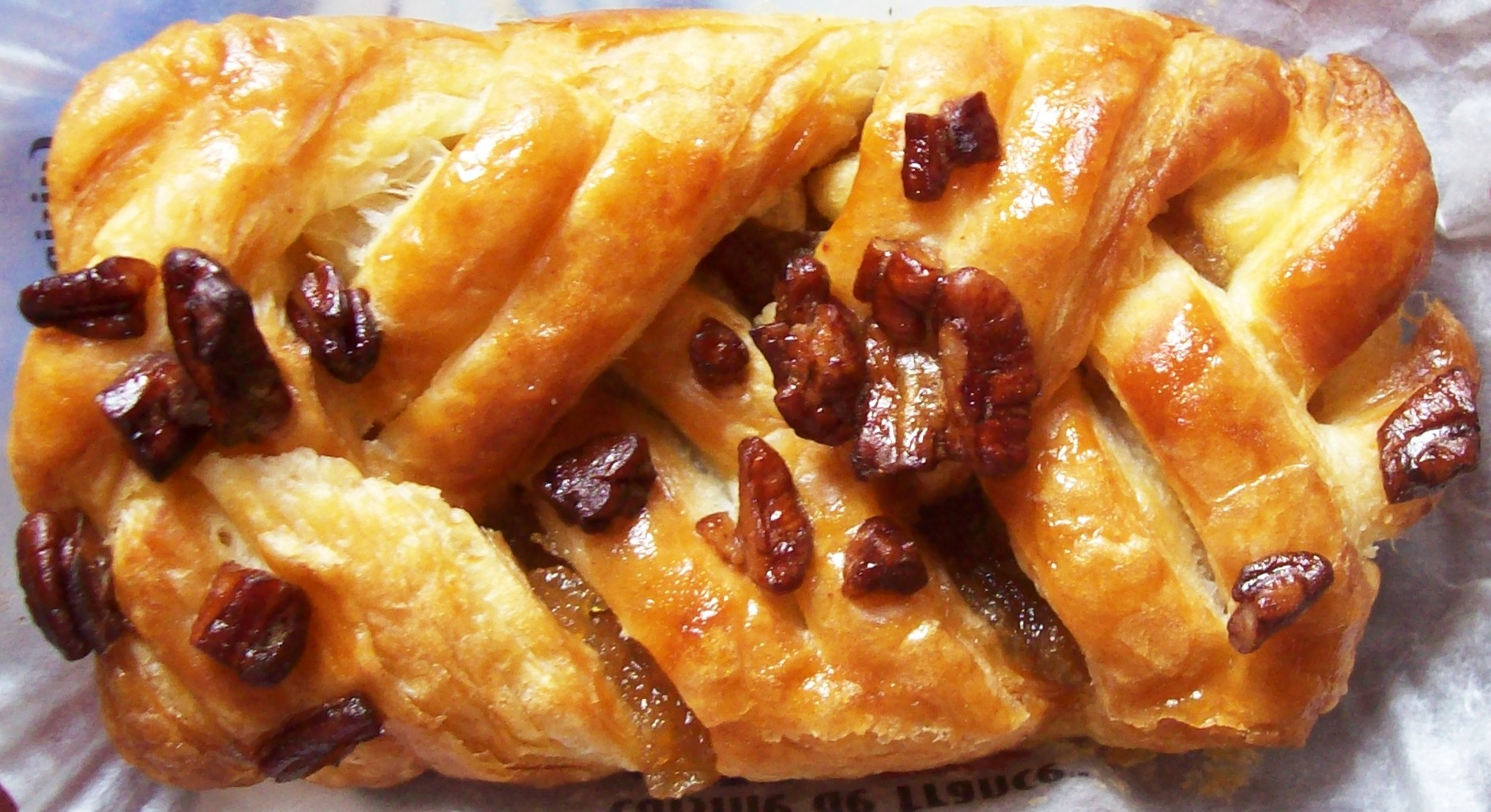
A pecan and maple syrup Danish pastry sold in the UK

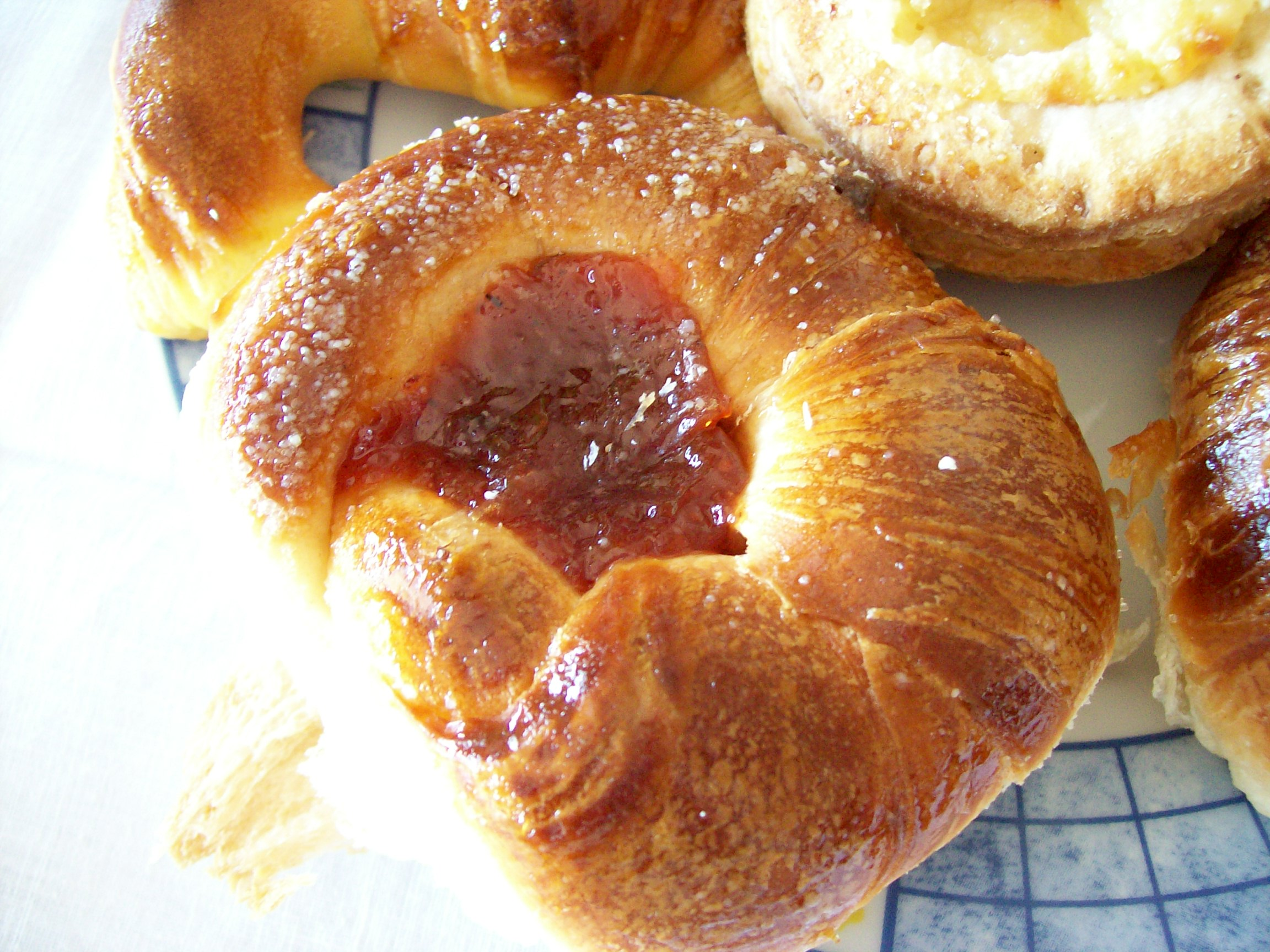
Argentine facturas with dulce de membrillo

An apricot Danish in England

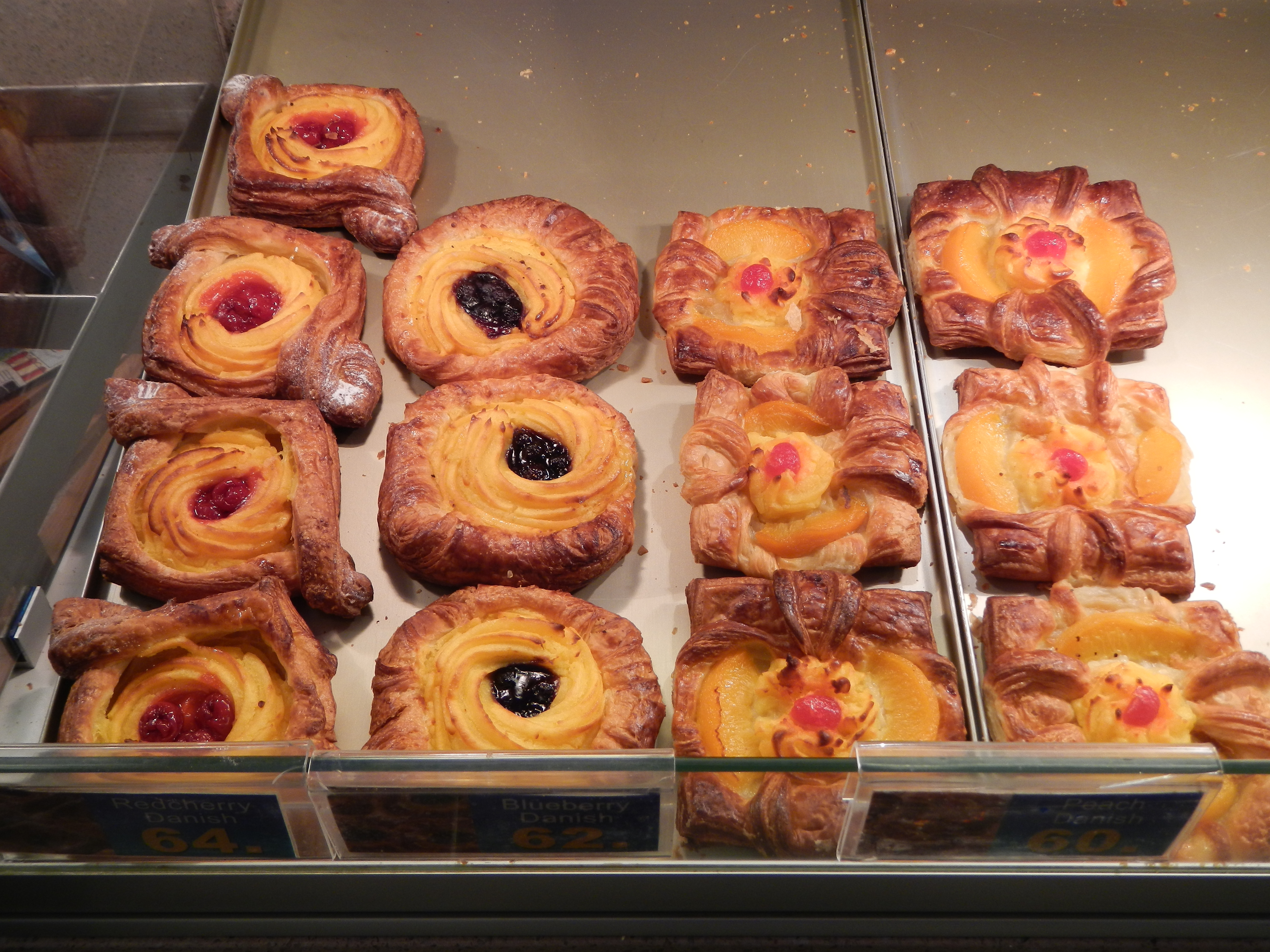
Danish pastries in the Philippines

Danish pastries in Vietnam

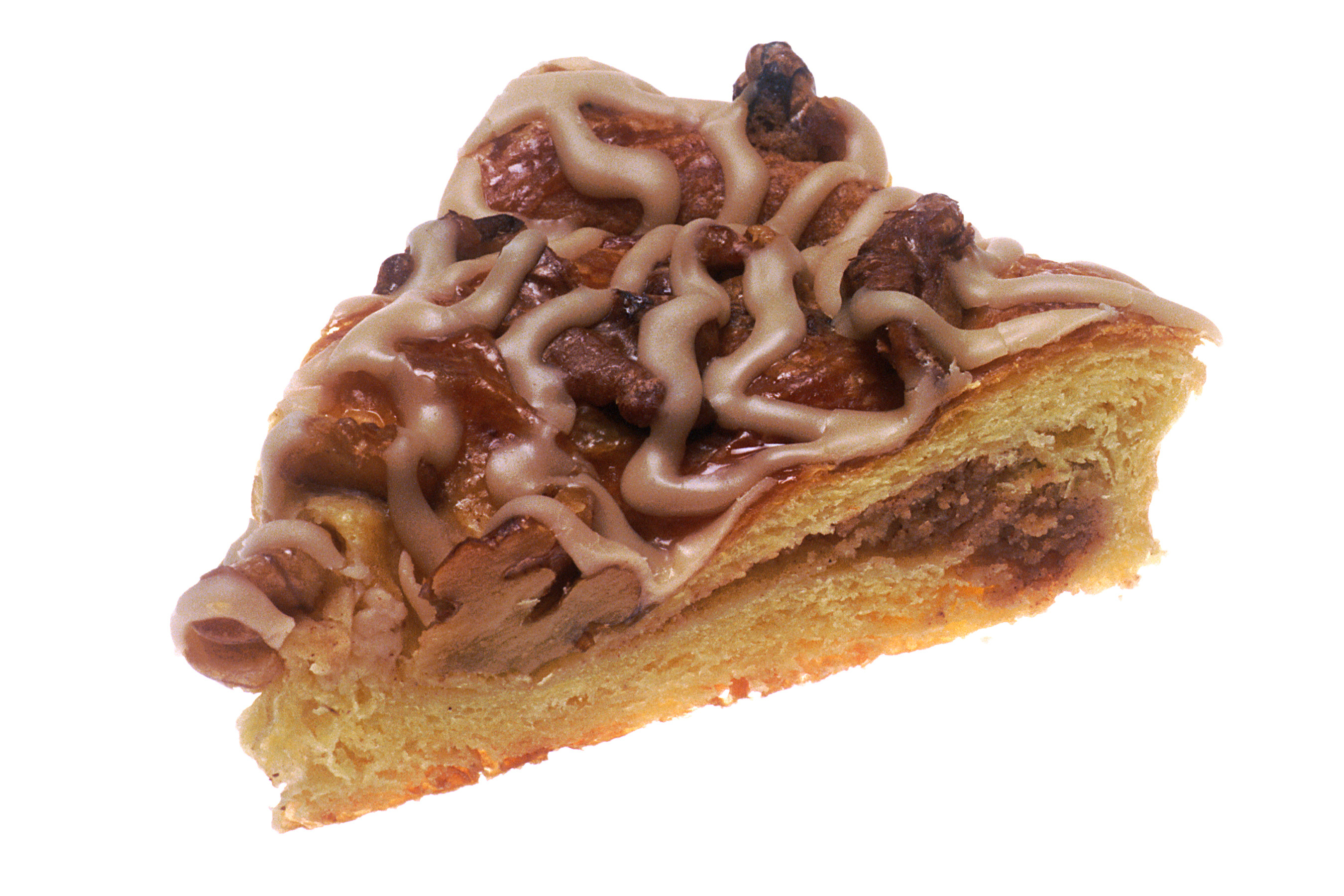
A slice of an American apple crumb Danish in the US

==== In the United States ====
A cheese Danish pastry at McDonalds

In the US, Danishes are typically given a central filling of fruit, nuts, and/or sweetened cream cheese prior to baking.

Danish pastry was brought to the United States by Danish immigrants. Lauritz C. Klitteng of Læsø popularized "Danish pastry" in the US around 1915–1920. According to Klitteng, he made Danish pastry for the wedding of President Woodrow Wilson in December 1915. Klitteng toured the world to promote his product and was featured in such 1920s periodicals as the National Baker, the Bakers' Helper, and the Bakers' Weekly. Klitteng briefly had his own Danish Culinary Studio at 146 Fifth Avenue in New York City. He was later employed by New York City chain restaurant owner Herman Gertner.

== See also ==
- Danish cookie
- Danish cuisine
- Doughnut
- Kolach
- Kringle
- List of pastries
- Pan dulce (sweet bread)

== Sources ==
- Cauvain, Stanley & Young, Linda S. (2007) Technology of Breadmaking. Springer Science & Business Media.
- Gisslen, Wayne (2013) Professional Baking. (6th edition) John Wiley & Sons, Hoboken, NJ. ISBN 9781118083741
