= Beurre fondue =

Food prepared by melting butter in water

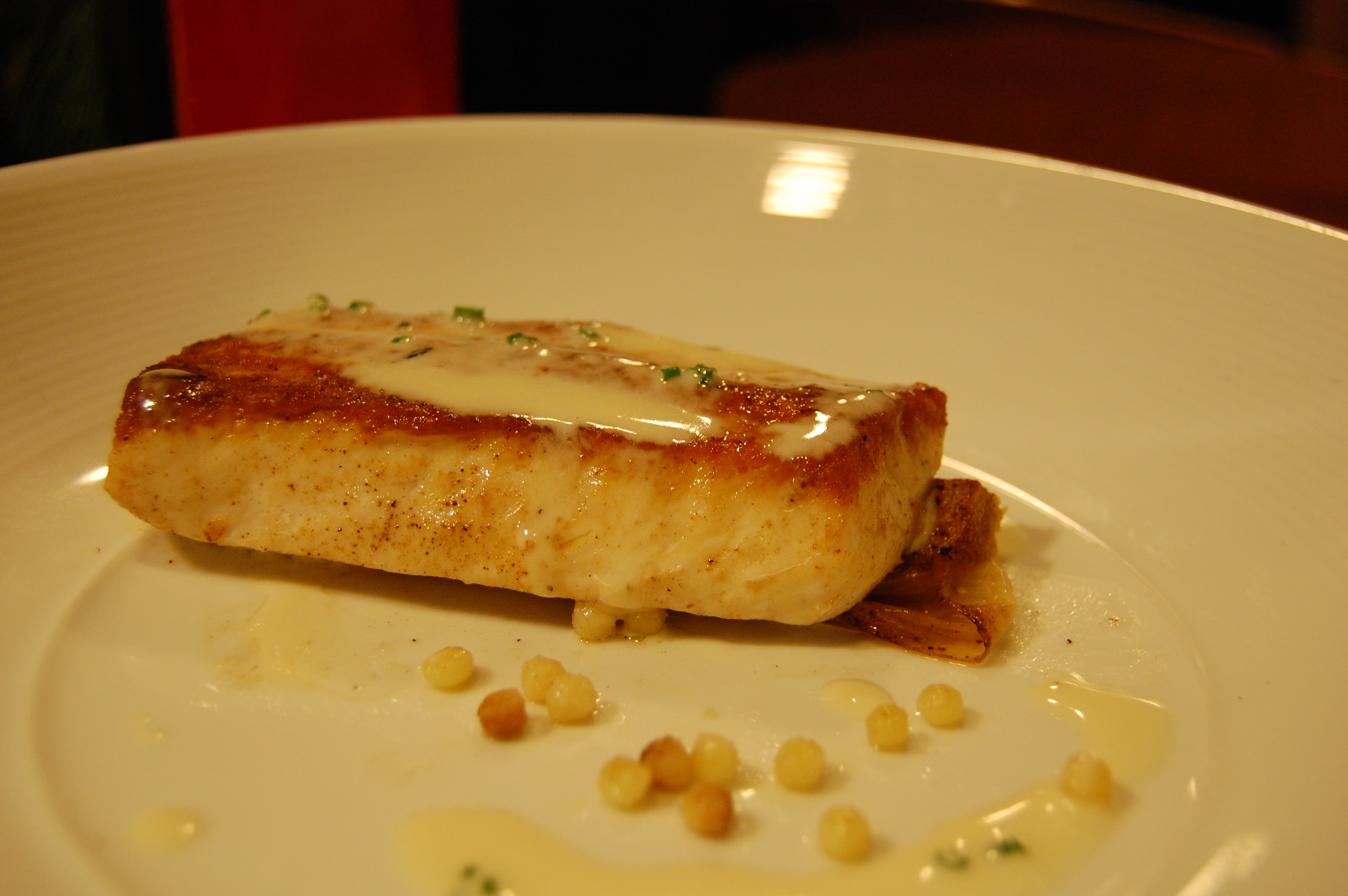
Fish topped with a beurre fondue

Beurre fondue (French pronunciation: [bœʁ fɔ̃dy]) is a food prepared by melting butter in water. The preparation serves to maintain the butter as an emulsified and creamy concoction. Beurre fondue is used by chefs because it has a lesser feel of greasiness on the palate, and the sauce is also easy for chefs to use compared to whole butter. Its uses are myriad, such as for braising and basting meats, poaching seafood such as lobster, cooking vegetables, and adding flavor to various foods and dishes.
