= Bendtsen's Bakery =

Historic Danish cuisine bakery in Racine, Wisconsin

Coordinates: 42.71892°N 87.81756°W

Bendtsen's Bakery is a historic Danish cuisine bakery in Racine, Wisconsin. It was established in 1934 and is known for its kringles. The bakery has been featured on Michael Stern's roadfood.com, Food Network's Road Tasted, Discover Wisconsin, Eat Your Way Across the USA, and Day Trips from Chicago.
