= Kringle =

Type of pretzel

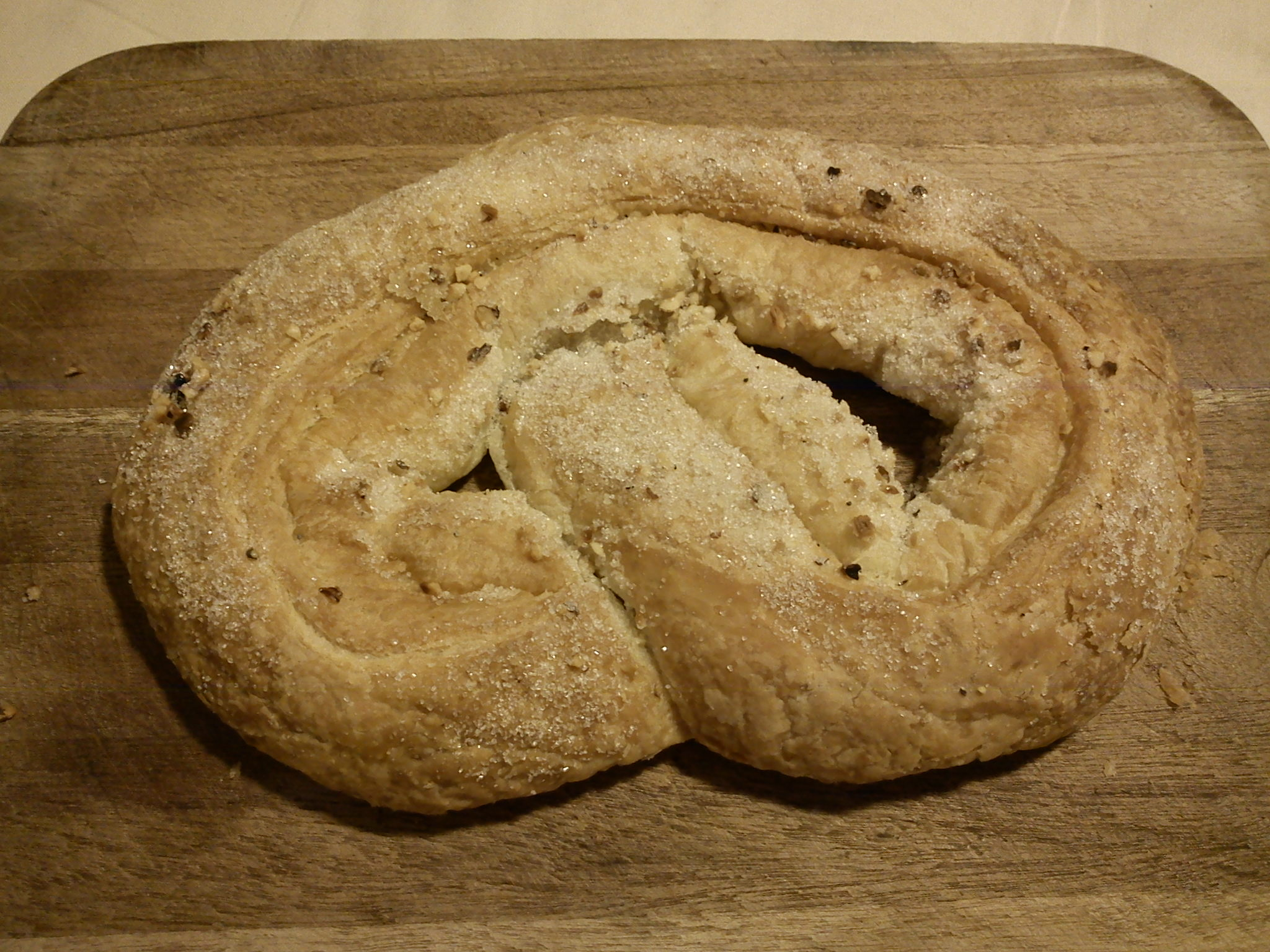
- Kringle
- Type: Pastry
- Region or state: Scandinavia

Kringle is a Northern European pastry or bread, a variety of pretzel that may be sweet, salty or filled, in a characteristic pretzel-like twisted shape.

In Danish and Norwegian, the word is kringle and Swedish: kringla.

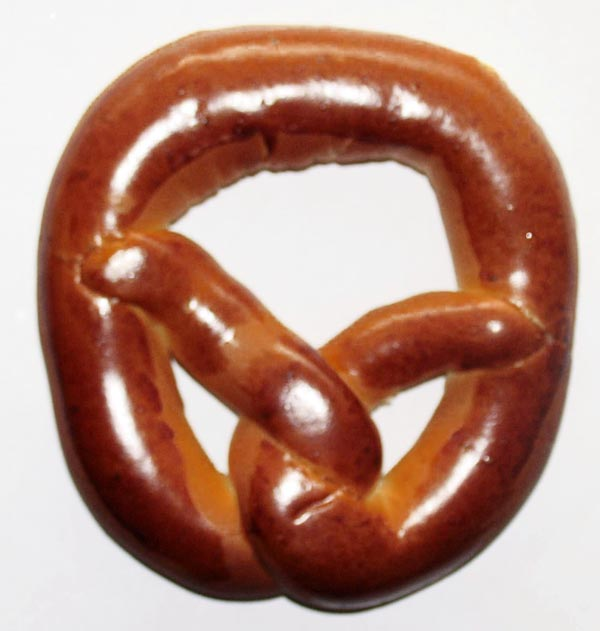
The Vyborg Kringle (Viipurinrinkeli)

== Scandinavia ==
Pretzels were introduced by Roman Catholic monks in the 13th century in Denmark, and from there they spread throughout Scandinavia and evolved into their many forms.

The word originates from the Old Norse kringla, meaning ring or circle.

=== Denmark ===
In Denmark, kringle denotes the pretzel-like knotted shape rather than the pretzel pastry type. Kringler (the plural of kringle) may be made from puff pastry or yeast dough, filled with remonce or marzipan and raisins, sprinkled with coarse sugar, nut flakes or icing. Other types of kringles in Denmark include saltkringler, which are small salty kringler — the Scandinavian equivalent of pretzels — and kommenskringler, which are half-hand-sized breads in the kringle shape, made from unsweetened yeast dough spiced with caraway seeds. Sukkerkringler are similar, but sweet pretzels, sprinkled with sugar instead of caraway. Fødselsdagskringler are a large sweet pretzel for birthday celebrations. Smørkringler are large crusty and sweet pretzels with a spread of butter on the backside. Smørkringler are not as popular nowadays.

Kringle has a long history in Denmark and is still a popular item in modern Danish bakeries. Nowadays, kringles are usually made with only one crossing and not two, as in the original kringle and pretzel shape.

=== Norway ===
In Norway, kringle or kringla often refers to yeasted, ring‑shaped pastries, sometimes filled with cinnamon sugar, almonds, cream, or jam. A common shape is a wreath made of connected cinnamon buns, similar to an almond kringle or klippekrans in Norwegian baking tradition.

=== Sweden ===
In Sweden, kringla (plural kringlor) refers to small, pretzel‑shaped sweet or bread‑like pastries typically served with coffee (fika). One well‑known variant is the sockerkringla, a sugar‑twisted soft bun made from enriched yeast dough infused with cardamom, dipped in melted sugar and also often enjoyed during Swedish fika, especially around holiday seasons. Bakers in Södertälje and Arboga are noted for local specialties such as Södertäljekringlan, a coffee‑served kringla that helped earn Södertälje the nickname “pretzel city”. Another variation, choklad‑kringlor, are chocolate‑flavoured, nut‑topped kringles, once so ubiquitous that old‑style bakeries would hang a kringle sign outside in Sweden.

== Estonia ==
An Estonian kringel or kringle is traditionally braided.

== United States ==
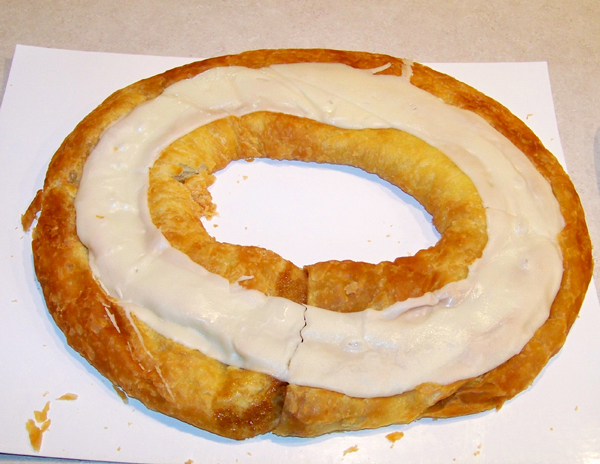
Kringle from Racine, Wisconsin

In the United States, kringles are hand-rolled from Danish pastry dough (wienerbrød dough) that has been rested overnight before shaping, filling, and baking. Many sheets of the flaky dough are layered, then shaped into an oval. After filling with fruit, nut, or other flavor combinations, the pastry is baked and iced.

Racine, Wisconsin, has historically been a center of Danish-American culture and kringle-making. A typical Racine-made kringle is a large, flat oval measuring approximately 14 inches by 10 inches (35 cm by 25 cm) and weighing about 1.5 lb (680 g). The kringle became the official state pastry of Wisconsin on June 30, 2013. Today, several of the original family-owned bakeries established in the 1930s and 1940s that continue the tradition of making kringles include Lehmann’s, Bendtsen’s, and O&H Danish Bakery. A Wisconsin distillery in Middleton, Wisconsin, makes a kringle-flavored cream liqueur from Wisconsin cream, rum, sugar, and natural kringle flavor.

In other parts of the United States, kringle may refer to a slightly sweet buttermilk cookie shaped like a pretzel or figure eight.

Other places where kringles may be found in the United States include the Ballard area of Seattle, Washington; Redmond, Washington; Solvang, California; Story City, Iowa; Burr Ridge, Illinois; Springfield, Missouri, and Watertown, Massachusetts. In 2005, Dana College in Blair, Nebraska, held a Kringle Kontest, which was won by Kirsten's Danish Bakery of Burr Ridge, Illinois.

=== Almond kringler ===
The almond kringler, also known as Swedish kringler, Norwegian kringler, and almond puff, is a variation of kringle popular in Minnesota. It is made with a buttery shortcrust, almond filling, and either an almond glaze or buttercream topping. Optionally, it can be topped with shaved almonds or chopped pecans. Its shape is also unique, often a rectangular or oval shape, and never a ring. This dish appeared in the 1940s, and despite the name was likely invented in the Upper Midwest.

== Symbolism ==
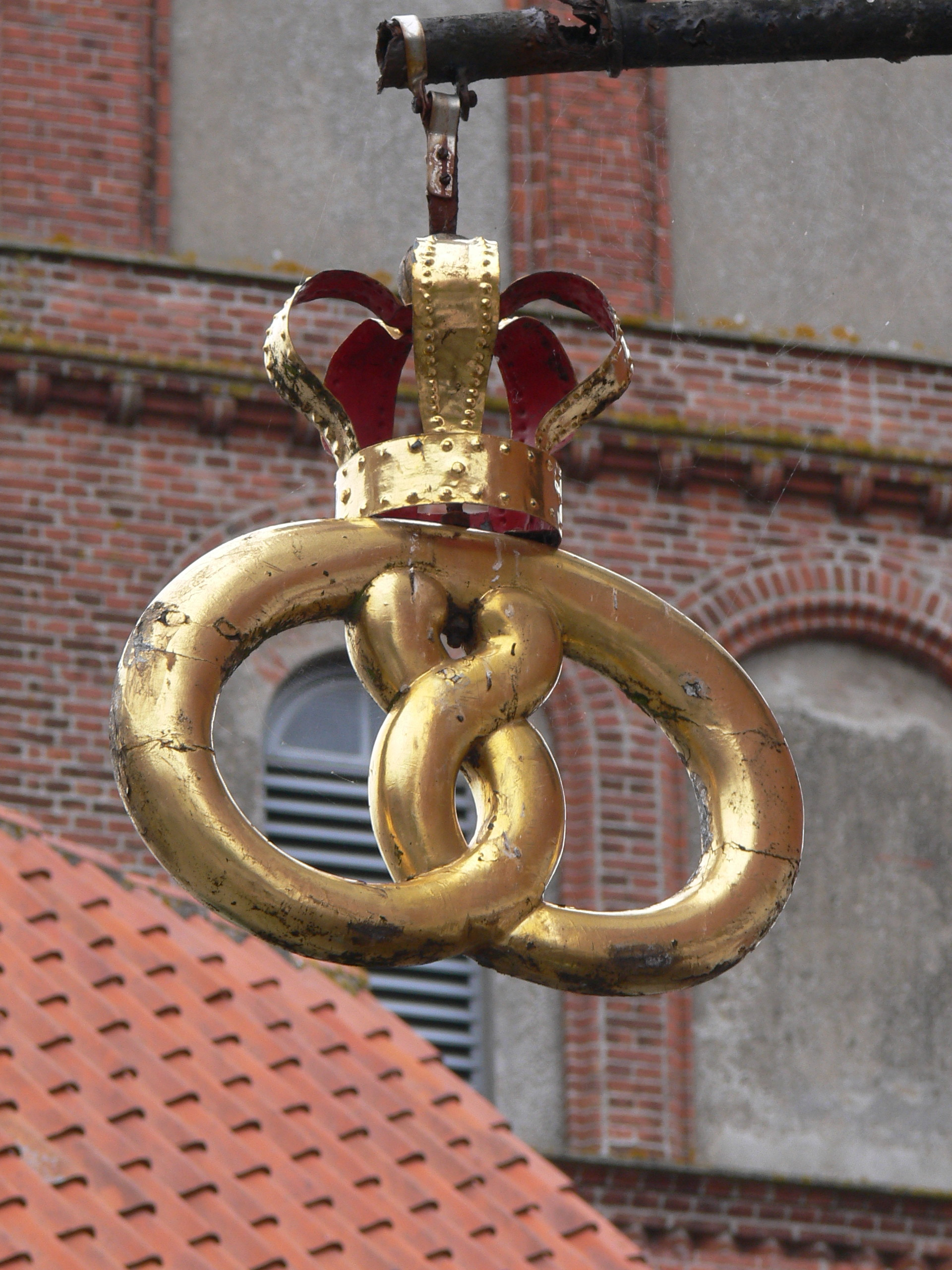
In Denmark, the official kringle emblem of the baker's guild is topped with a royal crown. Seen at a modern bakery shop in Ribe.

Baker's guilds in Europe have used the kringle or pretzel as a symbol for centuries. It is told (though currently unconfirmed by historic documents), that when Vienna was besieged by the Turkish Ottoman armies in 1529, local bakers working in the night gave the city defence an early warning of the attacking enemy. For this, they were later rewarded by the Pope with permission to use a crown as part of their kringle guild symbol.

The guild in Denmark is now the only baker's guild in the world with official authority to display a royal crown as part of their baker's guild trade symbol that is often hung outside of bakery shops.

== See also ==
- Danish cuisine
- Estonian cuisine
- King cake
- Norwegian cuisine
- Kringle domain – An entangled feature found in some proteins, named after the pastry
