= List of Good Eats episodes =

Good Eats is an informational cooking show in which Alton Brown would go into the history and or science of a particular dish or item that was the focal point of each episode. The show started with Food Network, airing 245 episodes of 14 seasons with eight specials and five shorts which aired on the Food Network website. In October 2018, Cooking Channel created a "Reloaded" season with 13 episodes. Season 15, titled Good Eats: The Return, began airing August 25, 2019 on Food Network.

== Series overview ==
Season	Episodes	Originally released	
Season	Episodes	First released	Last released
1	13	July 7, 1999	September 29, 1999
2	14	December 15, 1999	July 19, 2000
3	14	September 20, 2000	March 7, 2001
4	13	April 11, 2001	October 3, 2001
5	13	October 24, 2001	April 20, 2002
6	17	June 19, 2002	June 19, 2003
7	20	May 25, 2003	May 3, 2004
8	22	June 16, 2004	May 4, 2005
9	22	June 1, 2005	July 29, 2006
10	20	May 3, 2006	April 18, 2007
11	20	June 6, 2007	May 6, 2008
12	15	June 9, 2008	March 2, 2009
13	19	April 27, 2009	April 29, 2010
14	22	May 27, 2010	April 2, 2011
15	12	August 25, 2019	December 15, 2019
16	8	February 18, 2021	March 25, 2021
Specials	8	November 14, 1999	November 17, 2019
Shorts	5	April 20, 2002	2009
Reloaded 1	13	October 15, 2018	January 21, 2019
Reloaded 2	13	April 13, 2020	July 6, 2020

== Episodes ==
=== Season 1 (1999) ===
No.	Title	Featured food/topic	Equipment	Original release date	Prod. code
101	"Steak Your Claim"	Steak	Cast iron skillet	July 7, 1999	EA1A01
102	"These Spuds Are Made for Walkin'" "This Spud's for You"	Potatoes	Mandoline	July 14, 1999	EA1A02
103	"The Egg-Files"	Eggs, Lemon curd		July 21, 1999	EA1A03
104	"Salad Daze"	Salad	Salad spinner	July 28, 1999	EA1A04
105	"A Bird in the Pan"	Roasted chicken	Roasting pan	August 4, 1999	EA1A05
106	"Churn Baby Churn"	Ice cream	Ice cream freezer	August 11, 1999	EA1A06
107	"The Dough Also Rises"	Biscuits	Biscuit pan	August 18, 1999	EA1A07
108	"Gravy Confidential"	Gravy, roux	Pan and whisk for sauce	August 25, 1999	EA1A08
109	"A Bowl of Onion"	French onion soup	Electric skillet	September 1, 1999	EA1A09
110	"Hook, Line, and Dinner"	Fish	—	September 8, 1999	EA1A10
111	"Pantry Raid I: Use Your Noodle"	Pasta	Pot and colander for pasta	September 15, 1999	EA1A11
112	"Power to the Pilaf"	Pilaf (rice)	Rice cooker	September 22, 1999	EA1A12
113	"The Art of Darkness"	Chocolate	—	September 29, 1999	EA1A13

=== Season 2 (1999–2000) ===
No.	Title	Featured food/topic	Equipment	Original release date	Prod. code
201	"It's a Wonderful Cake"	Fruitcake	Whole spices	December 15, 1999	EA1B01
202	"For Whom the Cheese Melts"	Fondue, grilled cheese sandwich	Fondue pot, grater, DIY cheese slicer, DIY sandwich press	January 19, 2000	EA1B02
203	"Apple Family Values"	Apples	—	March 1, 2000	EA1B03
204	"Crustacean Nation"	Shrimp	—	March 8, 2000	EA1B07
205	"The Fungal Gourmet"	Mushrooms, clarified butter	—	March 15, 2000	EA1B13
206	"Crust Never Sleeps"	Pie crust	Food processor	March 22, 2000	EA1B04
207	"True Brew"	Coffee	—	April 12, 2000	EA1B08
208	"A Grind Is A Terrible Thing To Waste" "Daily Grind"	Ground beef: hamburger, meatloaf	—	April 26, 2000	EA1B11
209	"Fry Hard"	Fish and chips	Fryer	May 10, 2000	EA1B10
210	"Urban Preservation I: Jam Session"	Canning: jam and jelly	Canning gear	May 24, 2000	EA1B06
211	"Pantry Raid II: Seeing Red"	Tomato sauce, mirepoix	Can opener, knife sharpening, stick blender	June 7, 2000	EA1B12
212	"Citizen Cane"	Sugar, caramel	—	June 21, 2000	EA1B05
213	"Pork Fiction" "A Rib for All Seasons"	Pork ribs	—	July 5, 2000	EA1B14
214	"Ear Apparent"	Corn: creamed corn, cornbread, popcorn	—	July 19, 2000	EA1B09

=== Season 3 (2000–01) ===
No.	Title	Featured food/topic	Equipment	Original release date	Prod. code
301	"American Pickle"	Pickling	—	September 20, 2000	EA1C07
302	"Mussel Bound"	Mussels	Pot for reactive foods	October 11, 2000	EA1C02
303	"The Egg Files II: Man with a Flan"	Quiche, custard, flan	Whisk	October 18, 2000	EA1C03
304	"What's Up, Duck?"	Duck	Thawing frozen foods	November 1, 2000	EA1C04
305	"Behind the Bird" "The Remains of the Bird"	Turkey leftovers	Toaster, "W"	November 18, 2000	EA1C14
306	"Three Chips for Sister Marsha"	Chocolate chip cookies	Stand mixer, disher, vanilla extract	December 13, 2000	EA1C05
307	"Flap Jack Do It Again"	Pancakes, maple syrup	Measuring scoops, griddle for pancakes	December 27, 2000	EA1C09
308	"The Case for Butter"	Butter, beurre blanc	—	January 3, 2001	EA1C08
309	"Flat Is Beautiful"	Pizza, esp. dough	Yeast, baking stone, peel	January 10, 2001	EA1C11
310	"Pantry Raid III: Cool Beans"	Beans	—	January 17, 2001	EA1C12
311	"Mission: Poachable"	Poaching, esp. fish	—	January 31, 2001	EA1C13
312	"Tofuworld"	Tofu	Blender	February 7, 2001	EA1C01
313	"Head Games"	Cabbage	Cutting board	February 21, 2001	EA1C10
314	"Grill Seekers"	Grilling, roast lamb	Grill, charcoal, etc.	March 7, 2001	EA1C06

=== Season 4 (2001) ===
No.	Title	Featured food/topic	Equipment	Original release date	Prod. code
401	"Where There's Smoke There's Fish"	Smoking, smoked salmon	DIY temporary smoker	April 11, 2001	EA1D09
402	"Pressure"	Pressure cooking, broth	Pressure cooker	April 18, 2001	EA1D03
403	"Fry Hard II: The Chicken"	Fried chicken	Cast iron skillet	April 25, 2001	EA1D02
404	"Crustacean Nation II: Claws"	Lobster	—	May 16, 2001	EA1D05
405	"Ham I Am"	Ham	—	May 30, 2001	EA1D06
406	"The Egg Files III: Let Them Eat Foam"	Angel food cake	Whipping & mixing bowls	June 13, 2001	EA1D08
407	"A Chuck for Chuck"	Pot roast, chuck	Aluminum foil	June 27, 2001	EA1D12
408	"Pantry Raid IV: Comb Alone"	Honey	—	July 11, 2001	EA1D13
409	"In the Bulb of the Night"	Garlic	Garlic tools	July 25, 2001	EA1D11
410	"The Egg Files IV: Mayo Clinic"	Mayonnaise	—	August 8, 2001	EA1D10
411	"Puff the Magic Pastry"	Puff pastry	—	August 22, 2001	EA1D07
412	"True Brew II: Mr. Tea"	Tea	Tea tools	September 5, 2001	EA1D04
413	"Chile's Angles"	Chili peppers	Scovilles	October 3, 2001	EA1D01

=== Season 5 (2001–02) ===
No.	Title	Featured food/topic	Equipment	Original release date	Prod. code
501	"Deep Space Slime"	Gelatin dessert	Food mold (the tool, not the fungus)	October 24, 2001	EA1E01
502	"Oat Cuisine"	Oats, haggis	Slow cooker	November 7, 2001	EA1E06
503	"Crepe Expectations"	Crêpes	Crêpe pan, Teflon coating	November 28, 2001	EA1E09
504	"Celebrity Roast" "Family Roast"	Standing rib roast, beef aging	DIY roaster, probe thermometer	December 5, 2001	EA1E02
505	"Scrap Iron Chef: Bacon Challenge"	Bacon	—	January 9, 2002	EA1E12
506	"Deep Purple" "Berry from Another Planet"	Eggplant	Peeler	January 16, 2002	EA1E07
507	"The Trouble with Cheesecake"	Cheesecake	Springform pan	January 23, 2002	EA1E04
508	"Squid Pro Quo"	Squid, wok cooking	DIY wok burner	January 30, 2002	EA1E13
509	"Art of Darkness II: Cocoa"	Cocoa powder, brownies, syrup	Sifter, molinillo	February 13, 2002	EA1E08
510	"Squash Court"	Squash	—	March 6, 2002	EA1E03
511	"For Whom the Cheese Melts II" "Use Your Noodle II"	Macaroni and cheese	Casserole dish	April 3, 2002	EA1E10
512	"Shell Game II: Send in the Clams"	Clams, chowder	—	April 10, 2002	EA1E05
513	"This Spud's for You Too"	Potatoes: soup, salad, rösti	—	April 20, 2002	EA1E11

=== Season 6 (2002–03) ===
No.	Title	Featured food/topic	Equipment	Original release date	Prod. code
601	"The Other Red Meat" "Tuna: The Other Red Meat"	Tuna	Soy sauce	June 19, 2002	EA1F01
602	"Strawberry Sky"	Strawberries	Freezing with dry ice	July 3, 2002	EA1F03
603	"The Choke's on You" "Artichokes: The Choke is on You"	Artichokes	—	July 10, 2002	EA1F02
604	"Good Milk Gone Bad"	Yogurt	—	July 24, 2002	EA1F04
605	"Egg Files V: Quantum Foam"	Soufflé	Soufflé, oven	August 7, 2002	EA1F05
606	"Tomato Envy"	Tomato	Knife for tomato, food mill	October 2, 2002	EA1F06
607	"True Brew III: Amber Waves"	Home brewing (ale)	Beer tools	October 9, 2002	EA1F10
608	"Dip Madness"	Onion and Artichoke Dip and Guacamole	—	October 16, 2002	EA1F08
609	"Chops Ahoy"	Pork chops	Propane grilling	November 6, 2002	EA1F07
610	"Choux Shine"	Choux pastry	Weighing scale	November 13, 2002	EA1F09
611	"Casserole Over"	Casseroles	Casserole dish	January 8, 2003	EA1F11
612	"Use Your Noodle II: Fresh Pasta"	Ravioli, tortellini	Pasta machine	January 15, 2003	EA1F15
613	"Salad Daze II: The Long Arm of the Slaw"	Slaw	Shredders & slicers	January 29, 2003	EA1F12
614	"A Cake on Every Plate"	Yellow cake	Metric measurements	February 5, 2003	EA1F13
615	"The Icing Man Cometh"	Buttercream frosting	Frosting tools	February 19, 2003	EA1F14
616	"Beet It"	Beets	food service gloves	March 5, 2003	EA1F16
617	"Fit to be Tied"	Roulade: beef, seafood	Kitchen shears, Meat mallet	March 19, 2003	EA1F17

=== Season 7 (2003–04) ===
No.	Title	Featured food/topic	Equipment	Original release date	Prod. code
701	"Crustacean Nation III: Feeling Crabby"	Crab: salad, fritters; ghee (clarified butter)	Microwave	May 25, 2003	EA1G01
702	"Q"	BBQ pulled pork	DIY ceramic slow smoker	June 11, 2003	EA1G04
703	"Egg Files VI: French Flop" "Zen and the Art of Omelet Maintenance"	French omelette, frittata	Spatula & pan for omelette	July 9, 2003	EA1G03
704	"The Muffin Method Man"	Muffin, English muffin	—	July 23, 2003	EA1G06
705	"True Brew IV: Take Stock"	Chicken stock	Stockpot	August 6, 2003	EA1G11
706	"Sausage: A Beautiful Grind"	Fresh (uncured) sausage	Use & cleaning of meat grinder	August 20, 2003	EA1G09
707	"Raising the Steaks"	Inexpensive steak: fajita, sirloin	—	September 10, 2003	EA1G10
708	"The Pouch Principle"	Pouch steaming	—	September 13, 2003	EA1G08
709	"Ill Gotten Grains"	Wheat grain: wheatberry tapenade, bulgur, couscous	—	October 8, 2003	EA1G07
710	"The Trick to Treats" "Tricks for Treats"	Candy: brittle, jelly, taffy	Heat diffuser	October 26, 2003	EA1G13
711	"Potato, My Sweet"	Sweet potato	Waffle iron	November 12, 2003	EA1G02
712	"The Cookie Clause"	Sugar cookie	Cookie cutter, food coloring	December 4, 2003	EA1G12
713	"Herbal Preservation"	Herbs	Storing herbs	January 7, 2004	EA1G19
714	"Spice Capades"	Spices, curry, rub	Spice grinder, mortar and pestle	January 14, 2004	EA1G20
715	"The Man Food Show"	Corn dog, mini-burger (slider)	Deep fryer, electric griddle	January 28, 2004	EA1G16
716	"Fudge Factor"	Fudge, microwave "fudge"	Thermometer	February 11, 2004	EA1G05
717	"Sometimes You Feel Like A..."	Nuts, pesto	—	February 25, 2004	EA1G14
718	"I Pie"	Lemon meringue pie, pie crust	Blind baking	March 3, 2004	EA1G15
719	"Toast Modern"	Bread toast, French toast, bruschetta, rarebit	Electric toaster, toaster oven	April 14, 2004	EA1G17
720	"Top Banana" "Going Bananas"	Banana, plantain	—	May 3, 2004	EA1G18

=== Season 8 (2004–05) ===
No.	Title	Featured food/topic	Equipment	Original release date	Prod. code
801	"Hittin' the Sauce"	Sauce, Hollandaise	Thickening agents, Thermos	June 16, 2004	EA1H01
802	"Shell Game"	Oysters, horseradish	Oyster knife, glove	June 23, 2004	EA1H02
803	"Flat Is Beautiful II"	Flattened meat: carpaccio, paillard, cutlet, chicken Kiev	Meat pounding tools	July 7, 2004	EA1H03
804	"Circle of Life"	Doughnuts	Rolling pin	July 21, 2004	EA1H04
805	"Wonton Ways"	Wonton wrapper, potsticker, dim sum	Steamer, incl. DIY	August 4, 2004	EA1H05
806	"The Big Chili"	Chili con carne, chili powder	Pressure cooker	August 18, 2004	EA1H07
807	"Sandwich-craft"	Sandwiches	Sandwich press	October 3, 2004	EA1H11
808	"Soup's On"	Soup, cooking with kids	Soup pot, basic knife skills	October 3, 2004	EA1H12
809	"Say Cheese"	Cheese, fromage fort	Cheese tools	October 17, 2004	EA1H09
810	"Art of Darkness III: Ganache"	Chocolate: ganache, truffle, fudgesicle	—	October 27, 2004	EA1H06
811	"True Grits"	Cornmeal: grits vs. polenta	—	November 3, 2004	EA1H08
812	"Stuff It"	Stuffing	—	November 14, 2004	EA1H14
813	"Puddin' Head Blues"	Pudding, tapioca	—	December 1, 2004	EA1H13
814	"Melondrama"	Melon, sorbet	Zester	January 5, 2005	EA1H10
815	"Myth Smashers"	Dispelling culinary myths	Toxic fumes from non-stick pan (fact), mushroom brush (smashed)	January 19, 2005	EA1H22
816	"Cuckoo for Coq Au Vin"	Coq au vin	Wine for cooking	February 2, 2005	EA1H18
817	"Carrots: A Taproot Orange"	Carrot, carrot cake	—	February 16, 2005	EA1H16
818	"Sprung a Leek"	Leek, vichyssoise	Immersion blender	March 2, 2005	EA1H21
819	"Dr. Strangeloaf"	Baking bread	Bread yeasts, sourdough starter	March 16, 2005	EA1H15
820	"My Big Fat Greek Sandwich"	Gyros, tzatziki (sauce)	Rotisserie	April 6, 2005	EA1H17
821	"Field of Greens"	Greens, gratin	—	April 20, 2005	EA1H20
822	"Do the Rice Thing"	Medium- & short-grain rice: risotto, brown rice	—	May 4, 2005	EA1H19

=== Season 9 (2005–06) ===
In season 9, the show began broadcasting in 1080i high-definition in addition to standard-definition.

No.	Title	Featured food/topic	Equipment	Original release date	Prod. code
901	"Give Peas a Chance"	Peas		June 1, 2005	EA0902
902	"Dis-Kabob-Ulated"	Shish kebab	Skewer	June 15, 2005	EA0903
903	"Urban Preservation II: The Jerky"	Beef jerky	DIY liquid smoke maker, Dehydrators (incl. DIY)	June 29, 2005	EA0901
904	"Churn Baby Churn II"	"Super premium" ice cream	Ice cream scoop	July 13, 2005	EA0905
905	"Power Trip"	Energy bar, protein bar	—	July 27, 2005	EA0906
906	"Wake Up Little Sushi"	Sushi	Sushi toolkit	August 3, 2005	EA0907
907	"Cobbled Together"	Cobbler, grunt, crumble	—	August 24, 2005	EA0904
908	"Pantry Raid V: Good Wine Gone Bad"	Vinegar, sauerbraten	Tongs, Other kitchen uses for vinegar	September 21, 2005	EA0908
909	"The Waffle Truth" "Wondrous Waffles"	Waffles	Waffle irons, cooking spray	October 12, 2005	EA0909
910	"Great Balls O' Meat"	Meatballs	DIY chafing dish	October 19, 2005	EA0910
911	"Curious Yet Tasty Avocado Experiments"	Avocado: butter, ice cream, frosting	—	November 2, 2005	EA0912
912	"A Pie in Every Pocket"	Pocket pie	—	November 9, 2005	EA0913
913	"School of Hard Nogs"	Eggnog	Bourbon whiskey, nutmeg grater	December 1, 2005	EA0911
914	"My Pod"	Vanilla: fruit salad, crème brûlée, poached pear	Blow torch, Power drill (for coring pears)	January 11, 2006	EA0914
915	"Tender is the Loin I"	Beef tenderloin, steak au poivre	Butchering a whole tenderloin, slicing knife, stainless steel for pans	January 18, 2006	EA0918
916	"Raising the Bar"	Cocktails: martini, daiquiri, mint julep	Cocktail glasses, bar tools	January 25, 2006	EA0917
917	"Tender is the Loin II"	Beef tenderloin roasts, chateaubriand, carpaccio, cheesesteak	Grill pan	February 1, 2006	EA0919
918	"Flat Is Beautiful III: Flounder"	Flounder	Boning knife, poaching in oil (confit)	February 22, 2006	EA0915
919	"Your Pad Thai or Mine"	Pad thai	Wok	March 15, 2006	EA0920
920	"Shell Game IV: Scallops"	Scallops	—	April 5, 2006	EA0916
921	"Olive Me"	Olives, tapenade	Olive pitter	April 15, 2006	EA0921
922	"Behind the Eats"	Behind the scenes at Good Eats	The Good Eats production studio	July 29, 2006	EA0922

=== Season 10 (2006–07) ===
No.	Title	Featured food/topic	Equipment	Original release date	Prod. code
1001	"Tort (illa) Reform"	Tortillas	Tortilla press	May 3, 2006	EA1002
1002	"Just Barley"	Barley	Home grain mill	May 17, 2006	EA1001
1003	"House of the Rising Bun"	Sweet yeast breads	Cinnamon/cassia	June 7, 2006	EA1003
1004	"Cubing a Round"	Cube steak: country-style, Swiss, chicken fried	Meat cubers, needler, smoked paprika	June 21, 2006	EA1004
1005	"Water Works I"	Water	Water treatment plant, bottled water	July 12, 2006	EA1005
1006	"Water Works II"	More water	Water filters	July 19, 2006	EA1006
1007	"Peachy Keen"	Peaches	—	September 20, 2006	EA1007
1008	"Okraphobia"	Okra: pickled, fried, stewed	Grains of Paradise	September 27, 2006	EA1008
1009	"Squid Pro Quo II"	Squid, calamari	—	October 4, 2006	EA1009
1010	"Pop Art" "Pop Culture"	Popcorn	DIY popcorn popper	October 11, 2006	EA1010
1011	"Major Pepper"	Peppercorns	Pepper mill	November 8, 2006	EA1012
1012	"Fry, Turkey, Fry!"	Deep fried turkey, brining	Turkey derrick, fryer	November 12, 2006	EA1013
1013	"Pantry Raid VI: Lentils"	Lentils	Grains of Paradise	January 17, 2007	EA1015
1014	"Tortillas Again"	Tortillas, Nachos	—	January 31, 2007	EA1011
1015	"Bowl O' Bayou"	Gumbo and roux	—	February 14, 2007	EA1016
1016	"Fowl Territory"	Cornish game hen, food safety	Probe thermometer	February 21, 2007	EA1017
1017	"Fruit Ten from Outer Space"	Pomegranate	—	March 7, 2007	EA1014
1018	"Pickled Pink" "Corn the Beef"	Corned beef	—	March 14, 2007	EA1020
1019	"Espress Yourself"	Espresso	Espresso machine French press	April 4, 2007	EA1018
1020	"American Classics I: Spinach Salad"	Spinach salad	Salad spinner	April 18, 2007	EA1019

=== Season 11 (2007–08) ===
During season 11, Food Network tried to synchronize episodes with seasonal celebrations, changing the airdates of some episodes.

No.	Title	Featured food/topic	Equipment	Original release date	Prod. code
1101	"Milk Made"	Milk	Milk pasteurization and homogenization	June 6, 2007	EA1101
1102	"Pretzel Logic"	Pretzels, Mustard	—	June 20, 2007	EA1102
1103	"Coconut Cake Revival"	Coconut cake	—	July 9, 2007	EA1104
1104	"Sub Standards"	Substitutions	—	July 16, 2007	EA1105
1105	"Fishin' Whole"	Whole fish	DIY fish scaling box, Grilling planks	July 23, 2007	EA1106
1106	"Whithering Bites"	Dried fruit	Dehydrator (incl. DIY)	August 6, 2007	EA1107
1107	"Stew Romance"	Beef stew	—	August 13, 2007	EA1103
1108	"Dill-icious"	Dill pickles / Cucumber	Pickle crock	October 8, 2007	EA1110
1109	"Peanut Gallery"	Peanuts	—	October 15, 2007	EA1112
1110	"Bean Stalker"	Green bean casserole	Mandoline	November 7, 2007	EA1109
1111	"Kinda Blue"	Blueberries	—	November 14, 2007	EA1108
1112	"Puff the Magic Mallow"	Homemade marshmallow	Candy molds	December 3, 2007	EA1113
1113	"American Slicer"	Knife skills	Different types of steel, cutting board, knife storage	January 7, 2008	EA1111
1114	"The Wing and I"	Buffalo wings	DIY chicken wing steamer	January 30, 2008	EA1119
1115	"American Classics II: Apple of My Pie"	Apple pie	Apple corer, Pie bird	February 4, 2008	EA1115
1116	"If It Ain't Broccoli Don't Fix It"	Broccoli	—	February 18, 2008	EA1116
1117	"The Alton Crown Affair"	Crown of lamb	Butcher's twine	March 17, 2008	EA1118
1118	"Cran Opening"	Cranberry	—	March 31, 2008	EA1114
1119	"Honey I Shrunk the Cake"	Cupcakes	Cupcake pans and liners	April 14, 2008	EA1117
1120	"Going Dutch"	Cooking with Dutch ovens	Dutch oven	May 26, 2008	EA1120

=== Season 12 (2008–09) ===
No.	Title	Featured food/topic	Equipment	Original release date	Prod. code
1201	"Popover Sometime"	Popovers (also Yorkshire pudding, Dutch Baby (German pancake))	Popover pan	June 9, 2008	EA1202
1202	"Celeryman"	Celery and celeriac	Immersion blender	June 23, 2008	EA1203
1203	"Tuna, Surprise!"	Canned and pouched tuna	—	July 7, 2008	EA1204
1204	"There Will Be Oil"	Edible oils	—	July 29, 2008	EA1205
1205	"Frozen Cache"	Food preservation	Freezer	August 11, 2008	EA1201
1206	"Oh My, Meat Pie"	Mincemeat and shepherd's pie	—	October 27, 2008	EA1206
1207	"Et Tu Mame"	Edamame	Microwave oven	November 4, 2008	EA1207
1208	"Flat Is Beautiful IV: Going Crackers"	Graham crackers and crisps	Pasta roller, Accordion cutter	November 10, 2008	EA1208
1209	"American Classics III: Creole in a Bowl"	Creole-style beans and rice	—	November 17, 2008	EA1209
1210	"Switched on Baklava"	Baklava, handling phyllo dough	Basting brush, DIY rose water	December 1, 2008	EA1210
1211	"Ginger: Rise of the Rhizome"	Ginger	—	January 19, 2009	EA1212
1212	"A Cabbage Sprouts in Brussels"	Brussels sprouts	—	January 26, 2009	EA1211
1213	"Orange Aid"	Oranges	Juicer	February 2, 2009	EA1213
1214	"Pantry Raid X: Dark Side of the Cane"	Molasses	—	February 16, 2009	EA1214
1215	"Gills Gone Wild"	Wild salmon	Oven thermometers	March 2, 2009	EA1215

=== Season 13 (2009–10) ===
No.	Title	Featured food/topic	Equipment	Original release date	Prod. code
1301	"Crustacean Nation IV: Crawfish"	Crawfish	Pot basket	April 27, 2009	EA1302
1302	"Tamale Never Dies"	Tamales	—	May 4, 2009	EA1303
1303	"American Classics IV: Spaghetti with Meat Sauce"	Spaghetti and meat sauce	—	May 18, 2009	EA1304
1304	"Tender Is the Pork"	Pork tenderloin	—	May 25, 2009	EA1301
1305	"Undercover Veggies"	Parsnips	—	June 8, 2009	EA1305
1306	"Feeling Punchy"	Punch	Punch bowl	June 22, 2009	EA1306
1307	"Another Man Food Show: Breakfast"	Breakfast	French press, Coffee grinder, Grater, Cast-iron skillet, Non-stick pan	October 12, 2009	EA1311
1308	"Fermentation Nation" "Food Under the Influence"	Cooking with beer and wine	Corkscrew	October 19, 2009	EA1310
1309	"American Classics V: A Pound of Cake"	Pound cake	—	October 26, 2009	EA1309
1310	"The Once & Future Fish"	Farm-raised trout, sustainability	DIY smoker	November 2, 2009	EA1308
1311	"Pantry Raid XII: Turning Japanese"	Japanese ingredients, miso soup	Bonito shaver (Katsuobushi kezuriki)	November 9, 2009	EA1307
1312	"The Proof Is in the Pudding"	Cooking with spirits	—	November 23, 2009	EA1312
1313	"Live and Let Diet"	Tips for weight loss, smoothie, brisling, almond	Blender	January 4, 2010	EA1313
1314	"American Classics VI: Raising the Bar Again"	Cocktails: margarita, bloody mary	Glassware for cocktails	January 25, 2010	EA1314
1315	"The Ballad of Salty and Sweet"	Supercharging desserts with salt	—	March 8, 2010	EA1317
1316	"American Classics VII: Don't Be Chicken of Dumplings"	Chicken and dumplings	Pressure Cooker	March 22, 2010	EA1318
1317	"The Curious Case of Curry"	History of curry	DIY tandoor	March 29, 2010	EA1316
1318	"The Catfish Will Rise Again"	Catfish	—	April 16, 2010	EA1319
1319	"It's a Pan, It's a Dish, It's Paella"	Paella	Paella pan	April 29, 2010	EA1315

=== Season 14 (2010–11) ===
No.	Title	Featured food/topic	Equipment	Original release date	Prod. code
1401	"Porterhouse Rules"	Porterhouse steak	Chimney starter	May 27, 2010	EA1401
1402	"Grillus Domesticus"	Grilled chicken	—	June 3, 2010	EA1402
1403	"Age of Asparagus" "Spear of Influence"	Asparagus	—	June 10, 2010	EA1405
1404	"Little Big Lunch: Eggs Benedict"	Eggs Benedict	English muffin ring	June 17, 2010	EA1403
1405	"Flat Is Beautiful V"	Thin crust pizza	Peel	June 24, 2010	EA1404
1406	"Yes We Have No Banana Pudding"	Banana pudding	—	July 1, 2010	EA1406
1407	"American Classics VIII: Tacos"	Tacos	DIY fried taco shell mold	July 8, 2010	EA1407
1408	"Fry Hard III: Fry, Tempura, Fry!"	Tempura	Deep fryer	October 7, 2010	EA1408
1409	"Oat Cuisine II"	Oats	—	October 14, 2010	EA1409
1410	"All Hallows Eats"	Homemade candy	Food coloring	October 28, 2010	EA1410
1411	"Squash Court II"	Summer squash	Mandoline, Cut-resistant gloves (Kevlar)	November 4, 2010	EA1411
1412	"American Classics IX: Pumpkin Pie"	Pumpkin pie	Cleaver	November 18, 2010	EA1412
1413	"Egg Files VII: Meringue"	Meringue	—	December 30, 2010	EA1413
1414	"Pantry Raid XIII: Destination Chickpea"	Hummus, falafel, leblebi	Food processor, meat grinder, pressure cooker, slow cooker	March 7, 2011	EA1414
1415	"Devil Of A Cake"	Cake: devil's food, red velvet	—	March 14, 2011	EA1415
1416	"A Bird in the Pie Is Worth Two in the Bush"	Chicken pot pie	—	March 21, 2011	EA1416
1417	"Use Your Noodle IV: Lasagna"	Lasagna	Slow Cooker	March 28, 2011	EA1417
1418	"Waiter, There's a Fish in My Soup"	Bouillabaisse	—	April 4, 2011	EA1418
1419	"The Proof Is in the Bread Pudding"	Bread pudding	—	April 11, 2011	EA1419
1420	"Roll Call"	Yeast rolls	—	April 18, 2011	EA1420
1421	"Caul of the Flower"	Cauliflower	—	April 25, 2011	EA1421
1422	"Use Your Noodle V: Asian Noodles"	Asian noodles	—	May 2, 2011	EA1422

=== Good Eats: Reloaded, Season 1 (2018–19) ===
No.	Title	Featured food/topic	Equipment	Original release date	Prod. code
1	"Steak Your Claim: The Reload"	Steak	Cast iron skillet, Meat thermometer	October 15, 2018	TBA
2	"Use Your Noodle: The Reload"	Noodles	Pot and colander for pasta	October 22, 2018	TBA
3	"Fry Hard I: The Reload"	Fish and chips	Dutch oven, paper towels	October 29, 2018	TBA
4	"The Dough Also Rises: The Reload"	Biscuits, Lard, Buttermilk	Biscuit pan	November 5, 2018	TBA
5	"For Whom the Cheese Melts: The Reload"	Fondue, grilled cheese sandwich	Dutch oven, DIY sandwich press	November 12, 2018	TBA
6	"True Grits: The Reload"	Cornmeal: grits vs. polenta	-	November 19, 2018	TBA
7	"The Cookie Clause: The Reload"	Sugar cookie	Cookie cutter, food coloring	November 26, 2018	TBA
8	"A Grind is a Terrible Thing to Waste: The Reload"	Ground beef: hamburger, meatloaf	-	December 3, 2018	TBA
9	"Fry Hard II: The Reload"	Fried chicken	Cast iron skillet, Boning knife	December 10, 2018	TBA
10	"Art of Darkness II: The Reload"	Cocoa powder, brownies, syrup	Sifter, squeeze bottles	December 17, 2018	TBA
11	"I Pie: The Reload"	Pie	Blind baking	January 7, 2019	TBA
12	"A Bird in the Pan: The Reload"	Roast chicken, Brining, Zaatar, Aleppo pepper	Sheet pan	January 14, 2019	TBA
13	"Pressure: The Reload"	Pressure cooking, Pho	Pressure Cooker	January 21, 2019	TBA

=== Season 15, Good Eats: The Return (2019) ===
The sequence, air date, and episode numbers for season 15 (named onscreen as Good Eats: The Return) are unclear. Available sources including Food Network's Episode listings and streaming service disagree. The table below uses information from Food Network's streaming service.

No.	Title	Featured food/topic	Equipment	Original release date	Prod. code
1501	"American Classics X: Chicken Parm"	Chicken parmesan	Mortar and pestle, meat tenderizer	August 25, 2019	1502
1502	"Every Grain Old is New Again"	Chia and quinoa	Blender	August 25, 2019	1507
1503	"Hittin' the Sauce II"	Seafood sauces	—	September 1, 2019	1508
1504	"Immersion Therapy"	Sous-vide cooking	Immersion circulator	September 1, 2019	1503
1505	"My Shakshuka"	Shakshuka	Mandolin slicer, cast iron skillet, induction burner	September 8, 2019	1505
1506	"Let Them Eat (Icebox) Cake"	Refrigerator cake	Stand mixer	September 8, 2019	1511
1507	"Rich Little Poor Boy"	Oyster po’ boy	Oyster knife, chain mail glove, bánh mi bread, fry thermometer, spider strainer	September 15, 2019	1504
1508	"Raw Ambition"	Steak tartare and poke	—	September 15, 2019	1506
1509	"Date Tripper"	Dates	—	September 22, 2019	1510
1510	"Wild Yeast Risin'"	Sourdough	Waffle iron	September 22, 2019	1512
1511	"Holiday Spirit(s)"	Low-alcohol holiday beverages	—	December 15, 2019	1509
1512	"Whole Latke Love"	Latkes	Electric Griddle	December 15, 2019	1501

=== Good Eats: Reloaded, Season 2 (2020) ===
No.	Title	Featured food/topic	Equipment	Original release date	Prod. code
14	"The Egg Files: The Reload"	Eggs (Fried, Scrambled, Boiled)	Frying Pans	April 13, 2020	TBA
15	"True Brew: The Reload"	Coffee	Burr Coffee Grinders & Single-Cup Brewers	April 20, 2020	TBA
16	"Raising the Steaks: The Reload"	Top Sirloin steak	Broiler	April 27, 2020	TBA
17	"A Cake on Every Plate: The Reload"	Yellow cake	-	May 4, 2020	TBA
18	"The Icing Man Cometh: The Reload"	Standard & American Buttercream frostings	Buttermilk	May 11, 2020	TBA
19	"A Chuck for Chuck: The Reload"	Pot roast, chuck	-	May 18, 2020	TBA
20	"Oat Cuisine: The Reload"	Oats	TBA	May 25, 2020	TBA
21	"Flat is Beautiful II: The Reload"	Flattened meats	TBA	June 1, 2020	TBA
22	"The Fungal Gourmet: The Reload"	Mushrooms, Ghee	TBA	June 8, 2020	TBA
23	"Choux Shine: The Reload"	Choux pastry	TBA	June 15, 2020	TBA
24	"True Brew IV: Take Stock: The Reload"	Chicken stock	TBA	June 22, 2020	TBA
25	"The Art of Darkness: The Reload"	Chocolate	TBA	June 29, 2020	TBA
26	"Raising the Bar: The Reload"	Cocktails and clear ice cubes	TBA	July 6, 2020	TBA

=== Season 16, Good Eats: The Return (2021) ===
Season 16 of Good Eats premiered first on the Discovery+ streaming service. The table below uses information from Discovery+ for the streaming air dates. The episodes later aired on television on the Food Network.

No.	Title	Featured food/topic	Original release date
1601	"Marrow Minded"	Bone Marrow	February 18, 2021 (Streaming) June 22, 2021 (TV)
1602	"In Cold Brew"	Cold brew coffee	February 18, 2021 (Streaming) June 22, 2021 (TV)
1603	"Flat is Beautiful VI: Fry Bread, Fry"	Lángos and Cong you bing	February 18, 2021 (Streaming) June 29, 2021 (TV)
1604	"Immersion Therapy II: Gone Fishing"	Sous-vide cooking, Halibut, and Salmon	February 25, 2021 (Streaming) June 29, 2021 (TV)
1605	"Bibimbap 'Til Ya Drop"	Bibimbap	March 4, 2021 (Streaming) July 6, 2021 (TV)
1606	"Pantry Raid XIV: Deep Sea Green"	Edible seaweed	March 11, 2021 (Streaming) July 6, 2021 (TV)
1607	"Bagel Attraction"	Bagels	March 18, 2021 (Streaming) July 13, 2021 (TV)
1608	"Fermentation Man"	Kimchi and Kombucha	March 25, 2021 (Streaming) July 13, 2021 (TV)

=== Specials (1999–2020) ===
No.	Title	Featured food/topic	Equipment	Original release date	Prod. code
S01	"Romancing the Bird"	Thanksgiving: Roasted turkey, cornbread dressing, cranberry sauce	Electric knife/Electric Thermometer	November 14, 1999	EASP01
S02	"Down and Out in Paradise"	Tropical recipes	—	July 21, 2002	EASP02
S03	"Eat This Rock!"	Salt	—	May 2, 2004	EASP03
S04	"Good Eats 10th Anniversary"	Variety show	—	October 10, 2009	EASP04
S05	"'Twas the Night Before Good Eats"	Christmas: Wassail, roast duck, oyster dressing, sugar plums	—	November 30, 2009	EASP05
S06	"Right On Q"	Barbecue	DIY smoker	August 6, 2011	EASP06
S07	"Alton's Countdown to T-Day (Re-Romancing the Bird)"	Thanksgiving 2.0	—	November 20, 2011	EASP07
S08	"Turn On the Dark"	Dark chocolate	Cream Whipper (Cream Foamer)	February 10, 2012	EASP08
S09	"The Turkey Strikes Back ... Again"	Turkey Tikka Masala, Smoked Turkey Leg, Turchetta	TBA	November 17, 2019	EASP09
S10	"The House That Dripped Chocolate"	Pistachio butterfingers and peppermint patties	TBA	October 8, 2020	EASP10

=== Shorts (2002–2009) ===
No.	Title	Description	Original release date
1	"Potato Interstitials"	Brown and his company produced 10 short clips (called "Interstitial") about potatoes that were aired between shows as part of Food Network's Couch Potato weekend.	April 20, 2002
2	"10 Culinary Lessons from Alton Brown"	Ten 30-second "lessons about food and food history" were released on the Food Network website.	2006
3	"Good Eats Moments"	Another set of short culinary spots were produced for the Food Network website.	2007
4	"13 Thanksgiving Webisodes with Alton Brown"	Holiday themed lessons about different turkey-day dishes were released on the Food Network website.	2009
5	"13 Interstitials with Alton Brown"	Thirteen additional 2 to 3-minute "lessons about food and food history" were released on the Food Network website.	2009
