= Candy making =

Preparation and cookery of candies and sugar confections

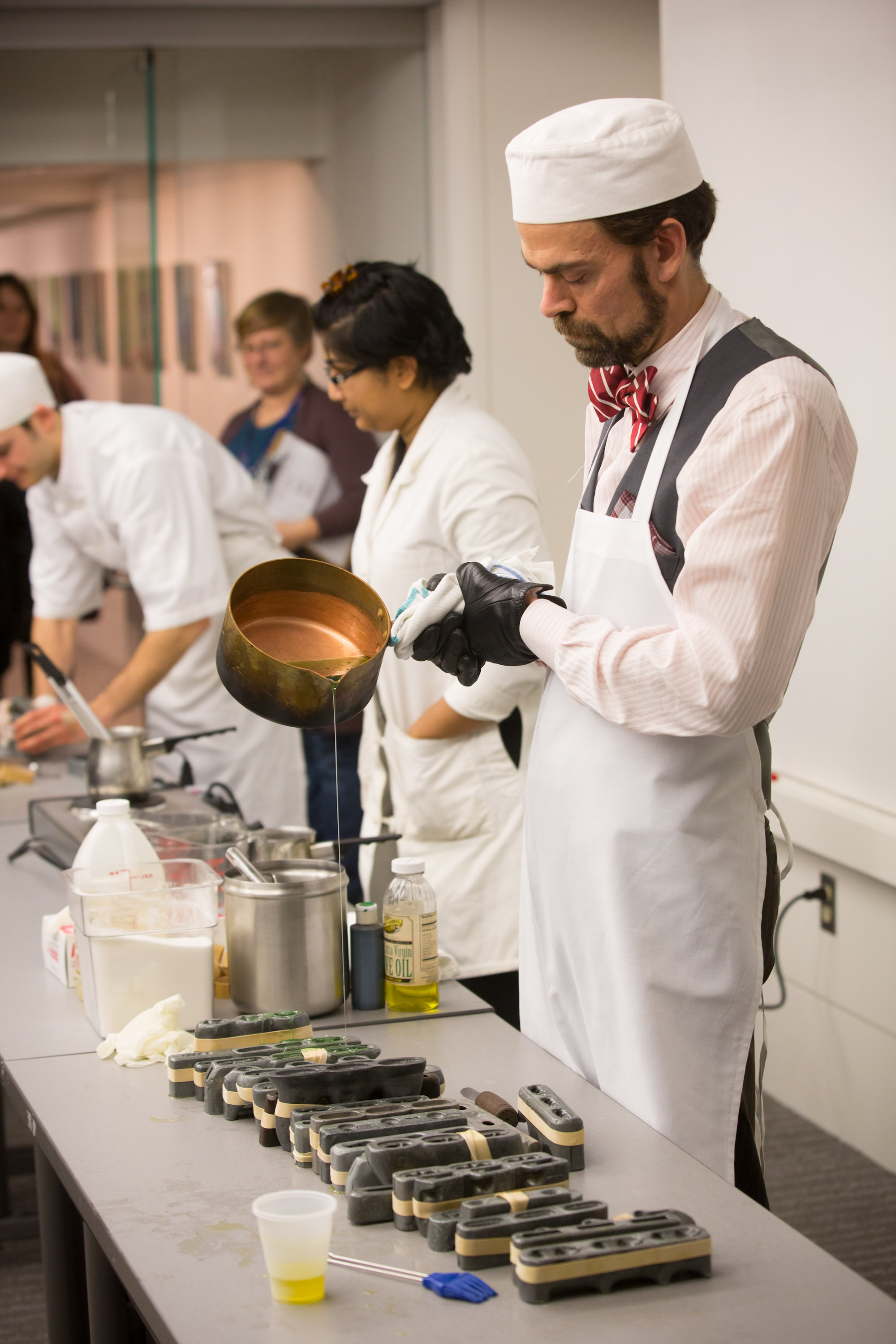
Hot liquid candy being poured into candy molds by a candymaker

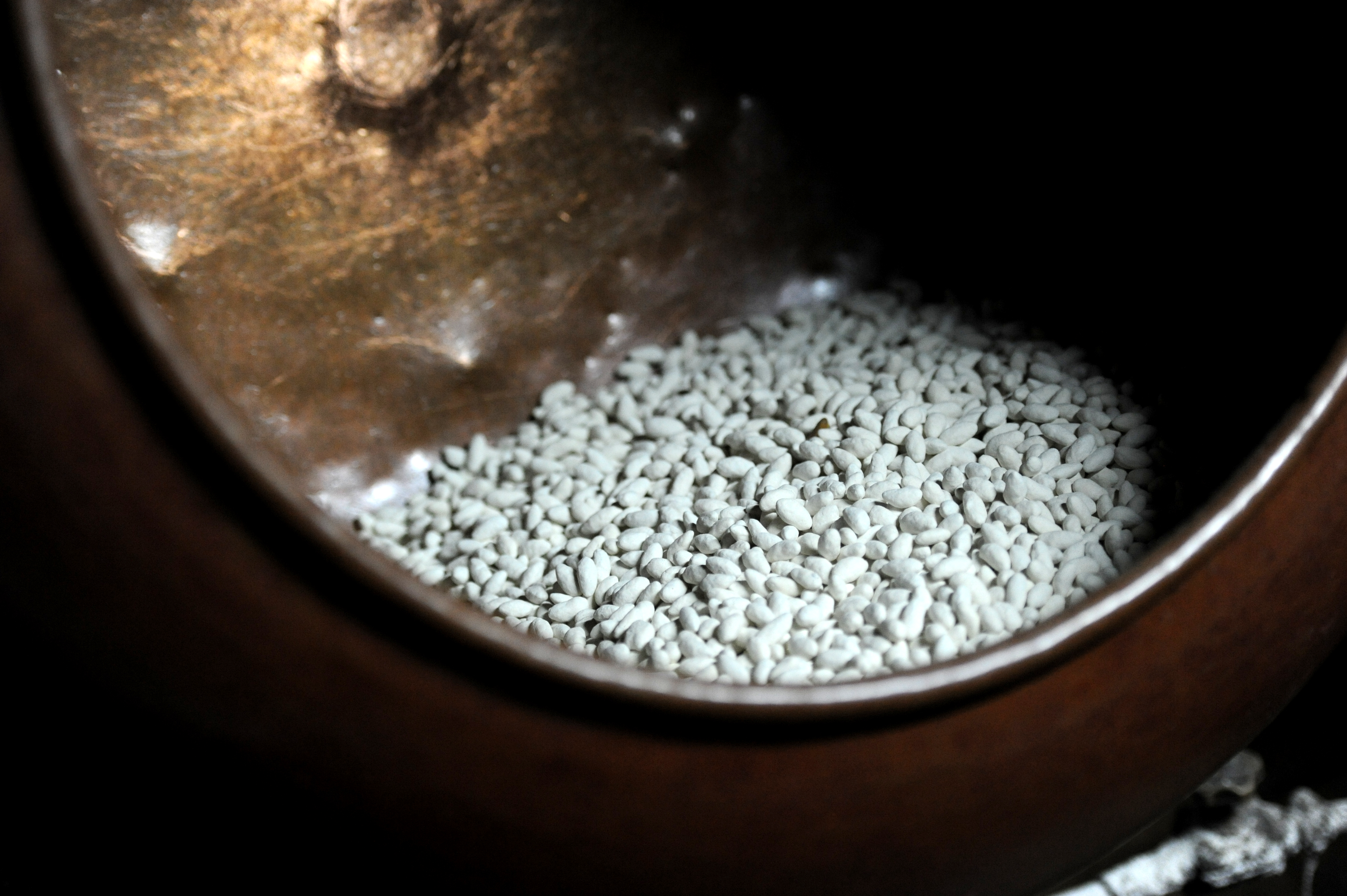
Candy being panned (coated) in a giant pot at a candy factory in Nablus, Palestine

Candy making is the preparation and cookery of candies and sugar confections. Outside of the US the general term used is confectionery. Candy making includes the preparation of many various candies, such as hard candies, jelly beans, gumdrops, taffy, liquorice, cotton candy, chocolates and chocolate truffles, dragées, fudge, caramel candy, and toffee.

Candy is made by dissolving sugar in water or milk to form a syrup, which is boiled until it reaches the desired concentration or starts to caramelize. The type of candy depends on the ingredients and how long the mixture is boiled. Candy comes in a wide variety of textures, from soft and chewy to hard and brittle.

A confectioner is a person who makes candy or chocolate. A chocolatier is a person who prepares confectionery from chocolate, and is distinct from a chocolate maker, who creates chocolate from cacao beans and other ingredients.

== History ==
The technology for candy making has generally kept pace with the technology of the times. For example, when steam power became common in textile and engineering factories, steam power was also used in candy factories.

Candy making and consumption increased due to the importation of sugar into Britain during the Tudor period. It increased greatly during the Industrial Revolution in the 19th century. Candy had previously been made by hand, either occasionally at home or by specialists in small, local businesses. Increased mechanization caused prices to drop and production to increase.

A way for candy makers to show that a candy was trademarked was to stamp an image or initials on the candy.

In the late 19th century and especially the early 20th century, industrial candy making was almost exclusively a masculine affair, and home-based candy making was a feminine affair. Candy was considered sweet and dainty, so making it at home, giving it away to friends, and perhaps selling small amounts in the local area, conformed with the Western gender roles for women of the time. Most women making and selling candy did so only seasonally or for a little extra money; they rarely earned enough to support themselves or their families. Despite several large brands being named after women or otherwise capitalizing on wholesome, feminine, and maternal images, very few were owned or operated by women.

Gender segregation also affected candy workers in the 19th century and the first half of the 20th century. Men and boys were employed for cooking or operating machinery, putting them at higher risk of injury or death. Women were mostly employed for wrapping and putting candies in packages or for hand-dipping candies in chocolate. The best-paid women were chocolate dippers, yet the wages of these skilled and experienced female workers were almost always lower than that of the worst-paid male machine operators.

== Hard candy ==
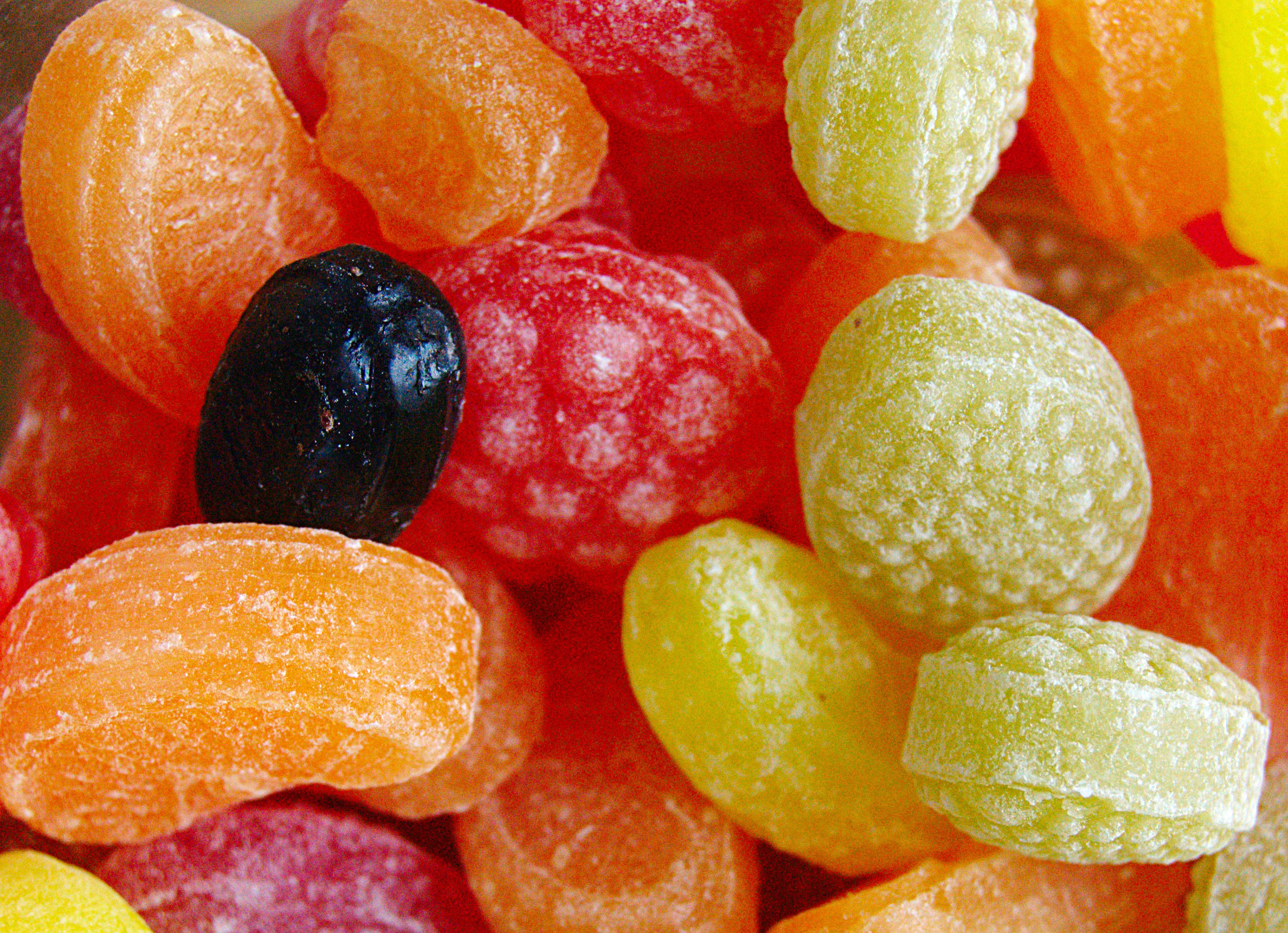
Fruit-shaped hard candy

Hard candy, also referred to as boiled sweet, is a candy prepared from one or more syrups boiled to a temperature of 160 °C (320 °F). After a syrup boiled to this temperature cools, it is called hard candy, since it becomes stiff and brittle as it approaches room temperature. Hard candy recipes variously call for syrups of sucrose, glucose, or fructose. To add color, food coloring is sometimes used.

=== Sugar stages ===
The final texture of candy depends on the sugar concentration. As the syrup is heated, it boils and the sugar concentration increases as water evaporates. A given temperature corresponds to a particular sugar concentration because the boiling-point elevation of the sugar solution is a colligative property (i.e., it is related to the concentration of the solution), so temperature is used as a marker for the necessary concentration. In general, higher temperatures and greater sugar concentrations result in hard, brittle candies, and lower temperatures result in softer candies. The stages of sugar cooking are as follows:

Stage	Example	Temperature	Sugar concentration %
Thread	syrup	110–112 °C (230–234 °F)	80
Soft ball	fudge	112–116 °C (234–241 °F)	85
Firm ball	soft caramel candy	118–120 °C (244–248 °F)	87
Hard ball	nougat	121–130 °C (250–266 °F)	90
Soft crack	salt water taffy	132–143 °C (270–289 °F)	95
Hard crack	toffee, butterscotch	146–154 °C (295–309 °F)	99
Clear liquid		160 °C (320 °F)	100
Brown liquid	liquid caramel	170 °C (338 °F)	100
Burnt sugar		177 °C (351 °F)	100

The names come from the methods used to test the syrup before thermometers became affordable. The "thread" stage is tested by cooling a little syrup, and pulling it between the thumb and forefinger. When the correct stage is reached, a thread will form. This stage is used for making syrups. For subsequent stages, a small spoonful of syrup is dropped into cold water, and the characteristics of the resulting lump are evaluated to determine the concentration of the syrup. A smooth lump indicates "ball" stages, with the corresponding hardness described. At the "soft crack" stage, the syrup forms threads that are just pliable. At the "hard crack" stage, the threads are brittle.

This method is still used today in some kitchens. A candy thermometer is more convenient, but has the drawback of not automatically adjusting for local conditions such as altitude, as the cold water test does.

Once the syrup reaches 171 °C (340 °F) or higher, the sucrose molecules break down into many simpler sugars, creating an amber-colored substance known as caramel. This should not be confused with caramel candy, although it is the candy's main flavoring.

== Soft candy ==
=== Cotton candy ===
Cotton candy, also known as "candy floss" or "fairy floss", is a form of spun sugar. Typical machines used to make cotton candy include a spinning head enclosing a small bowl into which granulated sugar is poured. Colored sugar or separate sugar and food coloring are used to provide color. Heaters near the rim of the head melt the sugar, which is squeezed out through tiny holes by centrifugal force, and the molten sugar solidifies in the air and is caught in a larger bowl which totally surrounds the spinning head. After the product builds up on the inside walls of the larger bowl, a stick, cone, or hands are inserted, upon which the sugar strands are gathered.

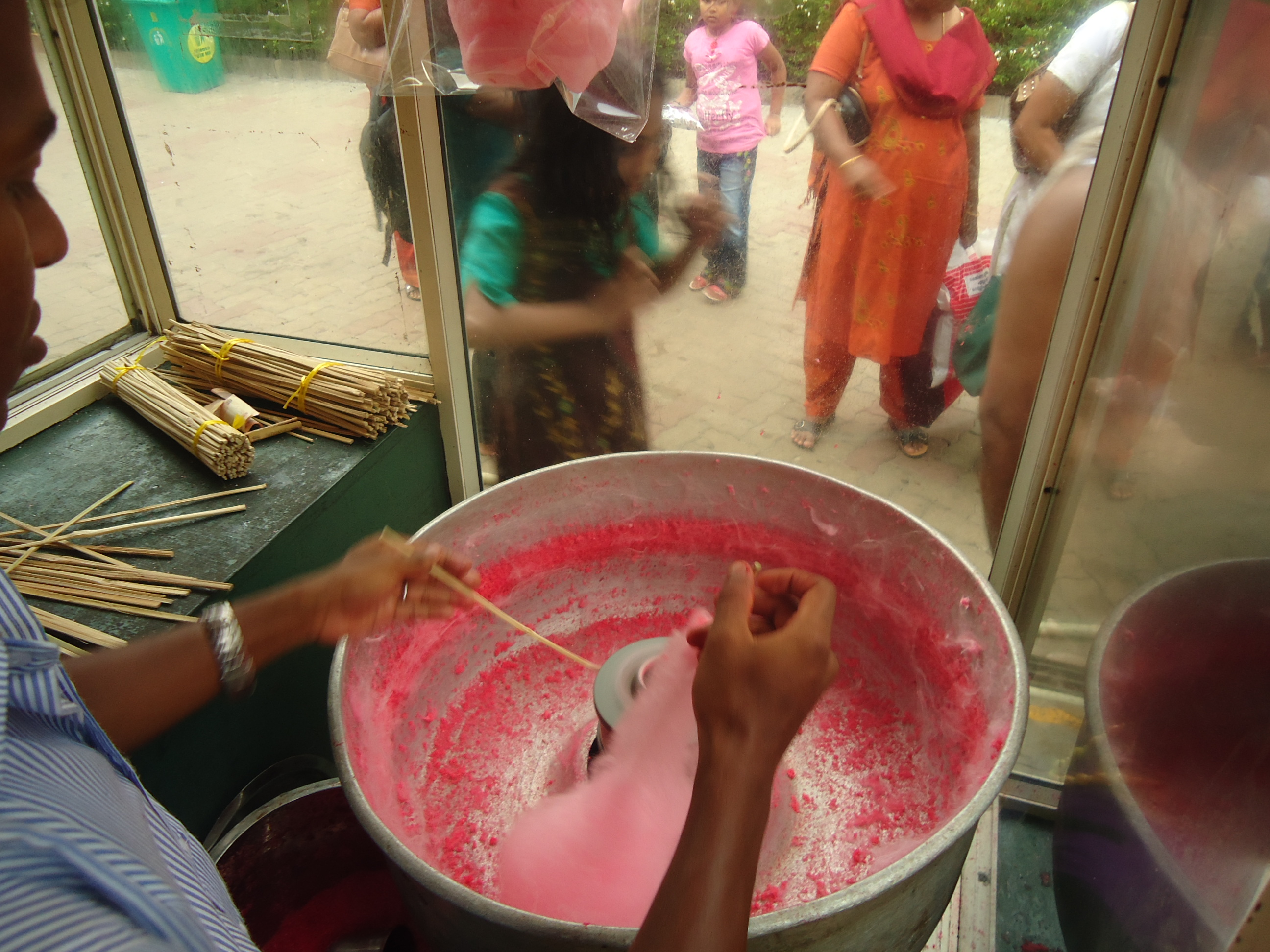
The bowl of a cotton candy machine

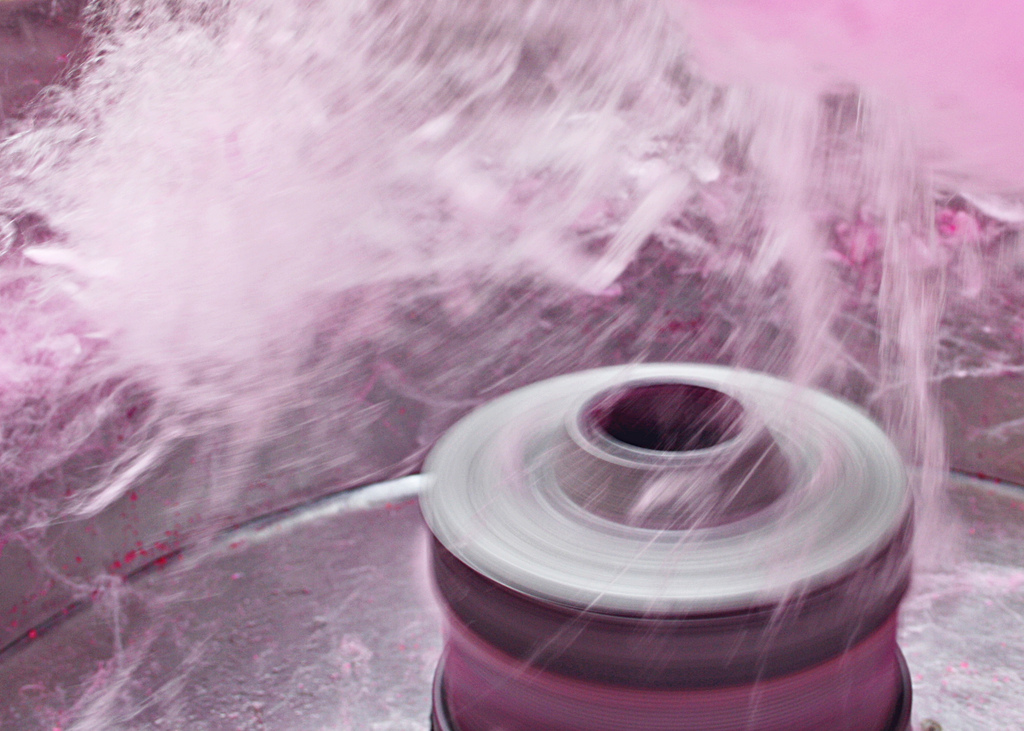
The spinning head of a cotton candy machine

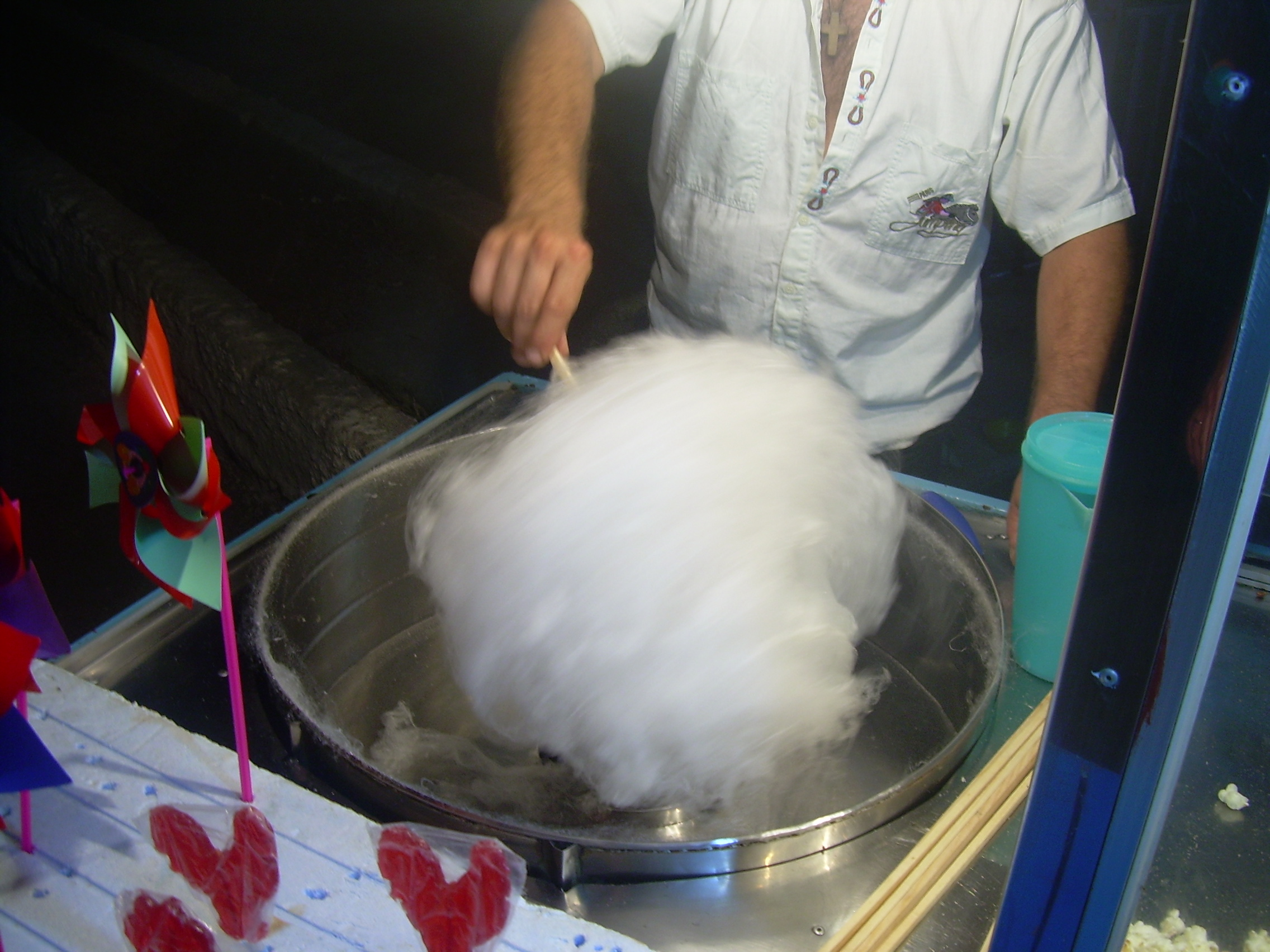
Cotton candy being prepared

=== Marshmallows ===
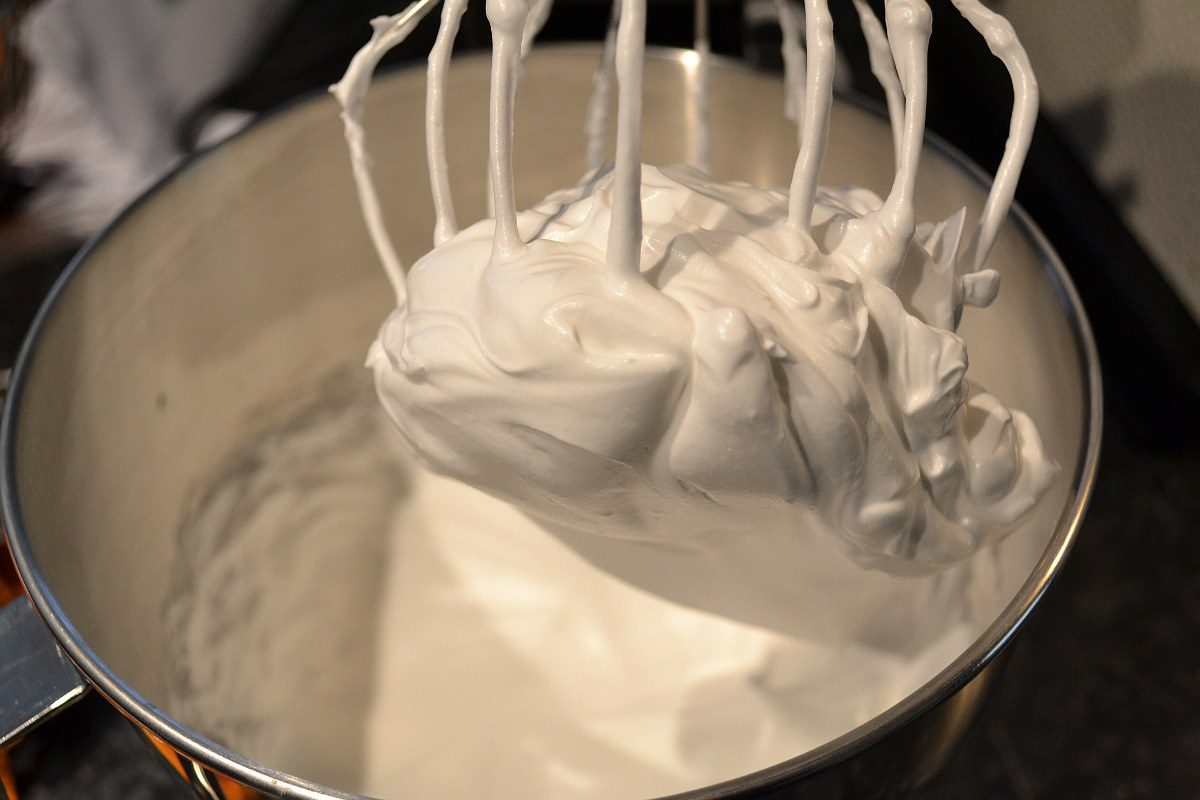
Marshmallow creme being prepared

Marshmallows are prepared by whipping air into gelatin, corn syrup and sugar. The use of marshmallow to make a sweet dates back to ancient Egypt, where the recipe called for an extract from the root of the marshmallow plant (Althaea officinalis) and mixing it with nuts and honey. Another pre-modern recipe uses the pith of the marshmallow plant, rather than the root. In modern times, marshmallows are often commercially prepared using extrusion.

== Chocolatiering ==
Chocolatiering, the preparing of confections from chocolate, involves the techniques of tempering, molding and sculpting. Tempering is a heat treatment method performed on chocolate involving heating and cooling the chocolate to result in desired characteristics like shininess of the chocolate or 'snap', the way it breaks. Molding is a design technique used in making chocolate pieces that are of a certain shape by taking liquid chocolate and pouring it into a mold and letting it harden. Sculpting is a type of three-dimensional artwork that may involve using molds and pieces of chocolate, and decorating the piece with designs in chocolate.

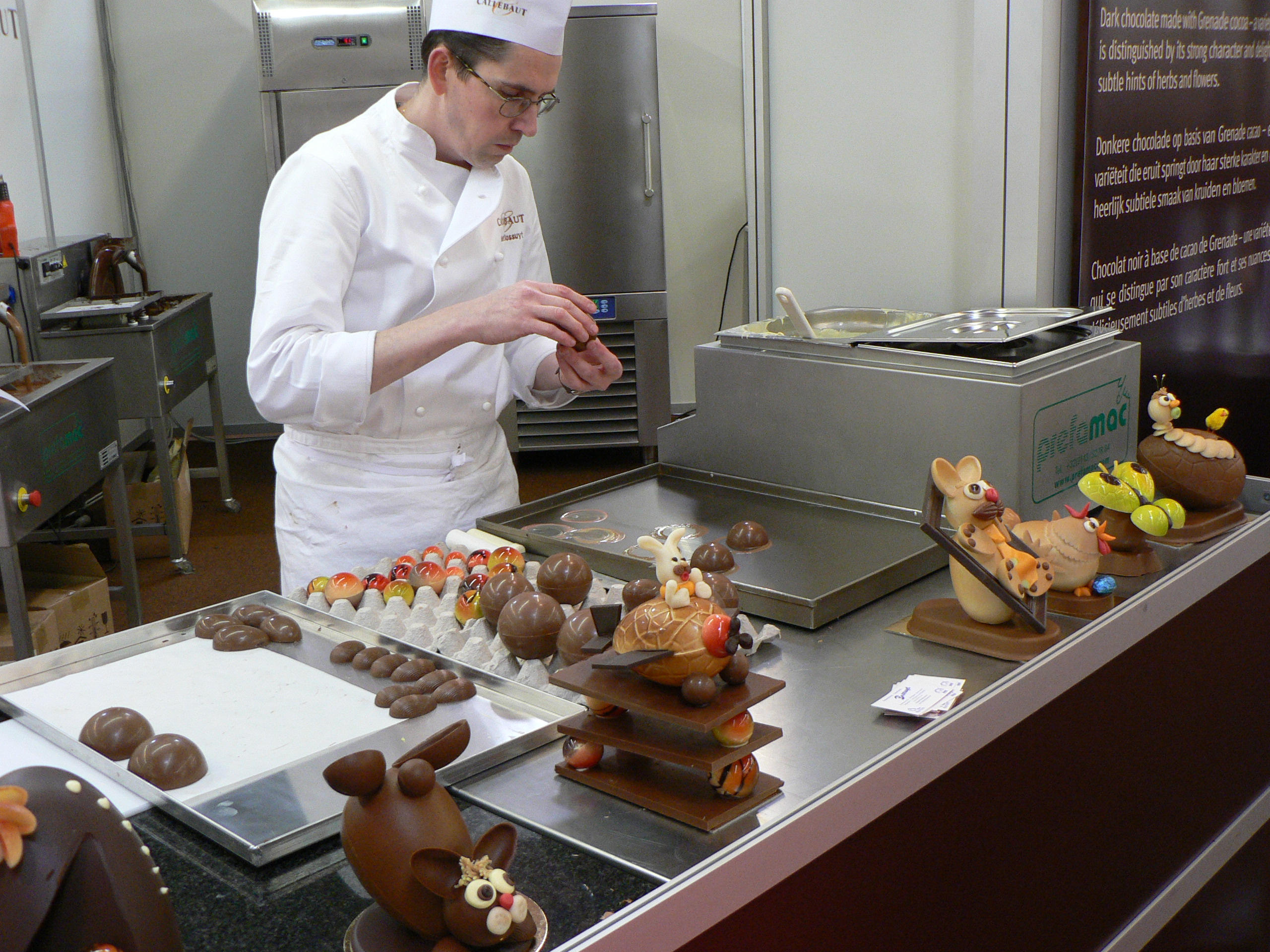
A chocolatier making chocolate eggs

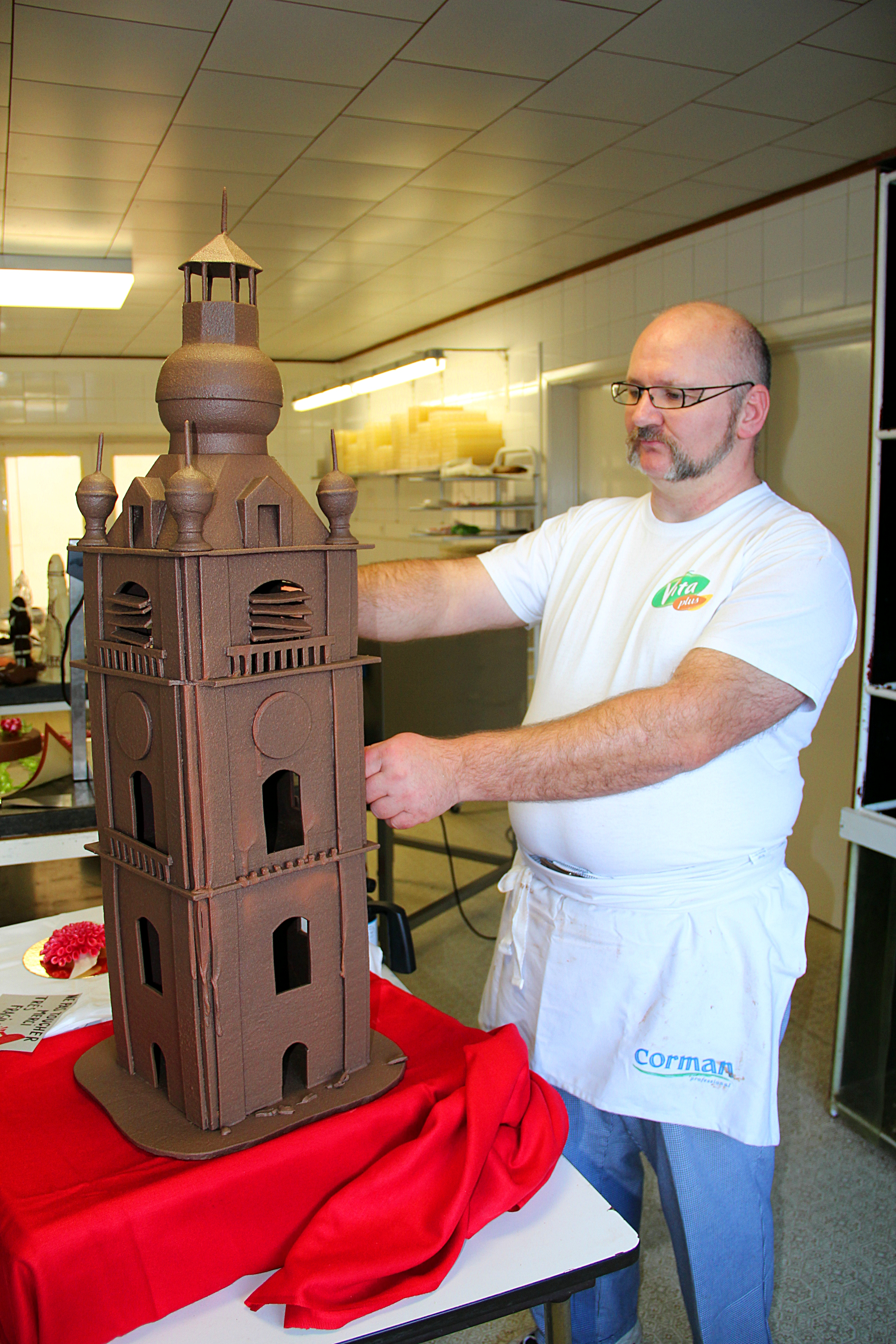
A chocolatier making a chocolate tower

== Occupational hazards ==
Making candy can be hazardous due to the use of boiled sugar and melted chocolate. Boiling sugar often exceeds 150 °C (302 °F)—hotter than most cooked foods—and the sugar tends to stick to the skin, causing burns and blisters upon skin contact. Worker safety programs focus on reducing contact between workers and hot food or hot equipment, and reducing splashing, because even small splashes can cause burns.

Some ingredients can also irritate the eyes and lungs, if, for example, powdered ingredients are accidentally inhaled, so worker protection involves reducing exposure to potentially irritating ingredients. Occupational dust exposure reduction measures can reduce health problems among workers.

Dust control measures can reduce risk of catastrophic dust explosions from sugar and other ingredients in candy. Dust explosions have caused the destruction of factories and killed candy makers. Some dust explosions include the 1948 explosion of a Brach's candy factory in Chicago, in which 17 employees died, and as recently as the three sugar silo fires at Perfetti Van Melle's candy factory in Kentucky, in 2003, 2015, and 2017.

== Tools and machinery ==
A variety of tools and machines are used in making candy, ranging from simple kitchen tools like bowls and spoons to elaborate factory machinery.

Because exact temperature control is critical for some candies, a common tool is the candy thermometer. Inexpensive candy thermometers measure food temperatures up to about 160 °C (320 °F), and those designed for commercial candy production may run even higher.

A starch mogul is used in candy factories to shape soft candies or candy centers from syrups or gels. These centers may then be sent through a chocolate enrober to coat them in chocolate.

== Pay ==
Although they are often skilled workers, candy makers are not generally highly paid. As of 2018 a chocolatier in the US, for example, usually earns about US$21,000 per year. As of 2024, factory-based food batchmakers, which includes candy makers working in factories, earn about US$41,000 per year in the US.

== See also ==
- Chocolaterie
- Chocolate bar
- Chocolate making
- Confectionery
- Federal Specification for Candy and Chocolate Confections
- List of bean-to-bar chocolate manufacturers
- List of candies
- List of cooking techniques
- Types of chocolate
