= Good Eats =

American television series

- Good Eats logo
- Created by: Alton Brown
- Starring: Alton Brown
- Country of origin: United States
- No. of seasons: 16
- No. of episodes: 256 (list of episodes)

Production
- Running time: 30 minutes
- Production companies: Means St. Productions (seasons 1–4); Be Square Productions (seasons 5–14); Brain Food Productions (seasons 15–16); Georgia Entertainment Industries (seasons 15–16)

Original release
- Network: Food Network (1999–2011); Cooking Channel (2011–2012)
- Release: July 7, 1999 – February 10, 2012
- Network: Food Network (2019–2021); Discovery+ (2021)
- Release: August 25, 2019 – July 13, 2021

Good Eats is an American television cooking show, created and hosted by Alton Brown, which aired in North America on Food Network and later Cooking Channel. Likened to television science educators Mr. Wizard and Bill Nye, Brown explores the science and technique behind the cooking, the history of different foods, and the advantages of different kinds of cooking equipment. The show tends to focus on familiar dishes that can easily be made at home, and also features segments on choosing the right appliances, and getting the most out of inexpensive, multi-purpose tools. Each episode has a distinct theme, which is typically an ingredient or a certain cooking technique, but may also be a more general theme such as Thanksgiving. In the tenth anniversary episode, Brown stated that the show was inspired by the idea of combining Julia Child, Mr. Wizard, and Monty Python. On May 11, 2011, Brown confirmed that the series would come to an end, ceasing production at episode 249. Good Eats is the fifth longest running Food Network series, behind 30 Minute Meals, Barefoot Contessa, Diners, Drive-Ins and Dives, and Chopped. In 2018, Cooking Channel premiered a spin-off, Good Eats: Reloaded, which combines footage from past episodes with new segments commenting on advances in cooking science and knowledge that had occurred since the original airdate. In 2019, the series was revived, with a new season on Food Network in August 2019. A second season of the revival was produced but in July 2021, Brown announced that Good Eats: The Return would not be returning for a third season.

== Format ==
The show had a distinct visual style involving Dutch angles and shots from cameras placed inside and on various items in the kitchen, including the ovens, refrigerator, and microwave oven. In some episodes, Brown and other actors play various characters to tell the story of the food. For example, in the episode "The Big Chili," Brown played a cowboy trying to rustle up the ideal pot of chili. In the episode "Give Peas a Chance" (a parody of The Exorcist), Brown plays a Father Merrin-like character who tries to convince a "possessed" child to eat (and like) peas. In other episodes Brown is simply himself, but interacts with fictional characters such as his eggplant- and tomato-wielding neighbor Mr. McGregor, or a city councilman who refuses to eat fudge. He also uses various makeshift teaching aids to demonstrate scientific concepts. They also feature many episodes where the ingredients themselves are portrayed by actors, represented by an agent who uses Brown to "gussy up" these foods for mainstream appeal.

Episodes of Good Eats typically began with an introductory monologue or skit that leads into the phrase "good eats." The show often closed with the phrase as well. For the first several seasons, Brown himself would say the words "good eats." Since approximately season seven, however, Brown avoids saying "good eats" at the end of the intro, stopping just short and allowing the main title graphics to complete the phrase.

Episodes were primarily set in the (fictional) kitchen of Brown's house, although his actual home kitchen was used in "Give Peas a Chance." In seasons 1–4, the episodes were shot in the actual home kitchen of Brown's original partners in the Atlanta, Georgia, area. In season 5, taping moved to the new home of the show's Line Producer (Dana Popoff) and Director of Photography (Marion Laney), in which they built a much larger and more versatile kitchen for taping. A 7-foot (2.1 m) section of the island was built for the show and placed on wheels, so it can be moved (or removed) for various shots, and a 12-square-foot (1.1 m^{2}) grid of pipe was hung from the ceiling, for easier placement of cameras and microphones. Starting with season 7, the show moved, this time to an exact replica of the previous kitchen and surrounding areas of the home, built on a sound stage. In the "Behind the Eats" special, Brown said that complaints by Popoff's neighbors (not adjacent neighbors but at the end of the block) prompted the move. The stove top and the sink are the only functioning pieces in this kitchen. Many of the other appliances have even had part of their backs removed, so shots of Brown can be taken from inside cabinets, ovens, and refrigerators. This change was generally not known until after season 7 started airing when the house used in season 5–6 was put on eBay for sale. It was then revealed that they had moved. It is generally thought that in the "Q" episode on barbecue that was taped in Brown's Airstream trailer, when Brown says that they are "building the set for Good Eats: The Motion Picture" this is in reality a reference to the new house set. The set was not officially unveiled on the show as a set until "Curious Yet Tasty Avocado Experiments."

Incidental music during the show is typically a variation of the show's theme, which in turn was inspired by music from the film Get Shorty. There are dozens of variations of the theme played throughout, crossing all genres of music, including the keypad tones in "Mission: Poachable" and nearly every incidence where a countdown of ten seconds is used. New music is composed for each episode by Patrick Belden of Belden Music and Sound. Brown met Belden while working on other projects before Brown's culinary training.

Each episode also featured tidbits, text pieces containing trivia related to the food or cooking technique featured in the episode. These are always shown just before ad breaks, and are often shown between major transitions in location or cooking action. The information presented is usually notes about the history of the food or technique, helpful cooking hints, or technical or scientific information which would be too detailed or dry to include as part of the show's live content.

During the show's first seasons, at the end of each episode Brown would give a summary of the important points covered during the episode; these points would be shown on the screen as he talked. These summaries still appear in later seasons from time to time, but rarely have the textual accompaniment. Brown also traveled to food manufacturing facilities frequently in the first few seasons to talk with experts about the foods being featured. In later seasons, he still visits farms, groves, and other places food is grown as well as processing plants and other factories, but less frequently.

Beginning in season 9, episodes have been recorded in high definition, and these episodes also appear on Food Network HD.

== Cast and crew ==
A staple feature of Good Eats is the presence of several recurring characters who play important roles on the show, from Brown's relatives and neighbors to various nemeses. In season 9, the episode "Behind the Eats" offered a backstage look at the show's production and revealed the origin of several characters. In the episode, Brown stated that all of the show's staff members have appeared on camera at some point.

Several members of Brown's real-life family have appeared on the show. His mother had a walk-on part; his daughter, Zoey, has appeared in several episodes; and his late grandmother, "Ma" Mae Skelton, co-hosted the biscuit episode "The Dough Also Rises." Even his Basset Hound and iguana have shown up in a couple of episodes. However, his then-wife DeAnna (who is also the show's executive producer) has never appeared in an episode, though she was mentioned in "Where There's Smoke, There's Fish." Specialists who hold real-life positions commonly appeared as themselves to provide Brown with useful information on the topic at hand.

=== Recurring characters ===
==== Fictional ====
Character	Played by:	Role on the show
"W" (AKA Vicki Wong)	Vickie Eng	A parody of James Bond's Q, "W" is a kitchen gear specialist. "W" is antisocial, sardonic, and finds Brown very annoying. Brown realizes this, and intentionally fools with gadgets and acts silly to get a rise out of her. He also likes to sabotage her attempts to make sales. Even so, she is the most reliable source of equipment for Brown, as she knows everything about kitchen tools and appliances. Her appearances are accompanied by a theme that sounds similar to those heard in the James Bond movies. "W"'s full name is revealed in the episode "Salad Daze II: The Long Arm Of the Slaw." In later episodes, "W" began working in the "Good Eats Testing Lab." In season 11, her role was interchanged with that of the "Dungeon Master," especially for food gadgets that imply food disintegration such as blenders and meat cubers. She reappeared in season 12. "Behind the Eats" revealed that in real life, Vickie Eng is Brown's chiropractor. In "Behind the Bird" "W" is revealed to be a cyborg. In Good Eats: The Return, she returns as "Wilhelmina," who worked as a customer service representative before being "hired" by Alton as his new equipment supervisor.
Marsha Brown-Brady	Merrilyn Crouch	Brown's older sister. Marsha is a constant source of annoyance to Brown (and, as revealed in some episodes, to members of the Good Eats production staff). She often tricks or cajoles Brown into cooking for her, which usually initiates the topic of that episode. For instance, in "Circle of Life," Marsha manages to talk Brown into making dozens of doughnuts for her Bunny Scout troop's bake sale, and then tricks him into buying them all back. She has been divorced more than once, as Brown referred to the ink not having dried on her LAST divorce "yet" in "Behind the Bird."
Elton Brady	John Herina	Marsha's son, therefore Brown's nephew. Elton is often featured as Brown's assistant, learning the ways of cooking in the process. Brown treats Elton almost like his own son, despite his and Marsha's constant bickering. Herina, who looks strikingly similar to Brown, also plays a young Brown when necessary, as in the introduction to the roulade-centered episode "Fit to be Tied," and also appeared in the 1996 movie Nightjohn as the character Homer Waller.
B.A. Brown; AKA "Anti-Alton"	Alton Brown	Brown's usually nonverbal evil twin of sorts, who is sometimes seen wearing black or in a goatee. Brown uses camera tricks to appear as himself on one side of the screen and as his "brother" on the other. B.A. is often used in a manner similar to Goofus and Gallant to compare and contrast Brown's and B.A's cooking techniques and their results. In "American Pickle," for example, B.A. compares Brown's sweet pickled fruit to a recipe for extremely hot "Firecracker" carrots. As shown in the episode "Sub Standards," he is Brown's identical twin in the Good Eats universe and can imitate Brown perfectly when he wants to.
Colonel/Uncle Bob Boatwright	Alton Brown	A white-clad Southern gentleman based on Colonel Sanders, Colonel Boatwright demonstrates traditional Southern recipes such as mint julep, upside-down cake, and fried catfish. Later episodes and the Good Eats Reloaded series have retitled him as "Uncle Bob Boatwright" and given him an eyepatch due to a botched LASIK procedure.
Cousin Ray	Steve Rooney	Brown's cousin, who seems to be a bit of a redneck. Ray also appears to be either a con man or simply uneducated when it comes to food. In "Crustacean Nation," Ray claims that the shrimp he is selling are turning pink because they are happy to see Brown when actually, as Brown explains, they are cooking in their shells due to the heat. Steve Rooney also plays Brown's "Aunt Verna" who is seen at Brown's Thanksgiving dinner.
The Mad French Chef	Steve Rooney	Brown's nemesis, who is stereotypically snobbish toward all non-French forms of cooking, and berates Brown for not using French techniques. Over the course of the series, the Chef seems to become angrier, as his title in different episodes changes to "Really Mad French Chef" and beyond. The Chef is currently voiced by Brown, as he is no longer seen on-screen except for one "appearance" as an oven mitt/puppet in the episode "Crepe Expectations."
Thing	usually Paul Merchant or Todd Bailey	Named after Thing from The Addams Family, Thing is a hand that appears in random locations to hand Brown ingredients and tools, to which Brown replies, "Thank you, Thing." or "That's a good idea, Thing." In "Behind the Eats," it was "revealed" that Brown's Thing is the son of the Addams Family Thing. Thing is rather mischievous, for example, sneaking a mousetrap into Brown's tin storage in "Great Balls of Meat," or tossing Brown a mandolin when he is actually referring to the mandoline.
Paul	Paul Merchant	Paul is Brown's apprentice and intern. Paul is generally incompetent and quite often seems to stress out regarding food-related issues. Brown often uses Paul as a human guinea pig for demonstrations, as in "Chile's Angels."
Lever/Lactose Man	Paul Merchant	While appearing to be a superhero, he is in fact a nemesis to Brown, keeping him from sharing his dairy creations with those afflicted with lactose intolerance. Lactose Man usually appears in dairy product-based episodes. A variation of the Lactose Man character, Lever Man (albeit in the same costume) appeared in "Mussel Bound," which is dedicated to mussels. Brown may or may not know the true identity of Lactose Man, as he identified Lever Man as being his apprentice, Paul. The Lever Man costume was revamped for use as Lactose Man. Brown himself is not lactose intolerant, which he revealed in "Breakfast Eats II."
Chuck	Daniel Pettrow	Chuck is Brown's "Butcher Neighbor." He has appeared in several episodes, such as "Bean Stalker," "Squid Pro Quo," "Stew Romance," and "A Chuck For Chuck." Chuck also appears in "Romancing the Bird: A Good Eats Thanksgiving," where he drives a "Turkey Truck" and explains the difference between fresh, frozen, and refrigerated turkeys. In "Chops Ahoy," Chuck abducts Brown's charcoal grill "Fireball" in order to convince Brown to buy a new propane grill.
Frances Andersen	Widdi Turner	Frances (a parody of Annie Wilkes from Misery) is Brown's self-proclaimed "biggest fan." She has a collection of many of the show's props that she purchased from the internet. Brown first encounters Frances in "This Spud's For You Too" after his truck breaks down, and she holds Brown hostage in "Ill Gotten Grains" after he loses his memory in a fender-bender.
Farmer McGregor	Bill Greeley	An elderly man who has a farm near Brown's home, he prides himself on his home-grown produce and enters them regularly in county fair food contests. Brown used to pilfer from McGregor's prized tomato patch, but soon stopped when McGregor realized the tomato dishes Brown gave him were made with his own tomatoes. McGregor also has the skills to produce larger-than-average produce, making a potato that weighed 29 lb (13 kg), although it lost in the "Big Food" contest to Brown's modest olive. McGregor also appears in the eggplant episode and brings Brown too many eggplants to use, often using wheelbarrows and cardboard boxes as delivery methods. The name of this character is most likely a nod to Beatrix Potter's Peter Rabbit children's books.
Coco Carl/Koko Karl	Bart Hansard	Carl is the symbol of conglomerate chocolate manufacturers like Hershey. In "Art of Darkness II: Cocoa," he is seen peddling his products to people on the streets and does his best to force them down people's throats. After encountering Carl, Brown becomes fed up with Carl's inferior products and sets out to produce his own homemade versions, but not before declaring that Carl's cocoa has toxic ingredients. Carl is on the run from the law because of this. In "Puddin' Head Blues," Carl disguises himself as "Auntie Puddin'" and is arrested at the end of the episode for his "crimes." In "Power Trip" Brown visits Coco Carl in a solitary confinement cell in a parody of The Silence of the Lambs. In the first episode of Good Eats: The Return, he's seen as a "fabled food fraud" that has been renamed to Koko Karl and sells Alton non certified tomatoes.
Sid Maxburg	Bart Hansard	Sid is a bombastic entertainment agent who is usually seen trying to revamp the images of allegedly forgotten foods like vanilla ("My Pod"), sweet potatoes ("Potato, My Sweet"), and okra ("Okraphobia").
The Dungeon Master	Lucky Yates	Brown's personal dungeon master (a parody of Igor and Sméagol), who appears in "Tort(illa) Reform," "Cubing A Round," "Fruit Ten from Outer Space," and "There will be Oil." Brown usually disapproves of his loose grip on reality; for example, in "Cubing A Round" he spends $1,500 on a Swiss mechanical steak cuber using "the little plastic thing with the numbers on it" (AB's credit card).
"Government Agents," "Food Police"	Brown, Marshall Millard, others	These characters occasionally appear to deliver legal information pertaining to the food(s) featured in an episode. The 'government agents' appear as 'Men in Black', mostly from the FDA or USDA, who give information about government quality standards for certain foods, speaking in a stereotypical loud, fast-paced, overly-serious tone.
Itchy & Twitchy	Jim Pace (Itchy) and Brett Soll (Twitchy)	Brown's two lawyers, always dressed in business suits and carrying briefcases. They appear when AB is about to break some culinary, copyright or "common sense" law, saying, "Well, if it isn't my lawyers, Itchy and Twitchy." In the episode "Pretzel Logic," they direct Brown not to use lye in order to give color to his pretzels. Neither of the two lawyers normally talks, instead they open their briefcases and hand Brown papers which he reads and complains about, giving brief descriptions of the law. The joke goes on when the two are constantly handing Brown many papers. Sometimes, Brown is beaten by the system and must find an alternative way to cook food, and in other cases Brown uses his own method as a loophole. In "Orange Aid," it is revealed that Twitchy can talk, as heard when he had a brain freeze from AB's "Orange Julius"-clone drink. The duo reappeared during "Alton Brown Live: The Edible Inevitable Tour," once again as Brown's lawyers. In addition to work as his lawyer, Pace accompanies Brown during the show's musical numbers playing percussion or the role of "DJ Itchy." Pace has returned on "Good Eats: the Return" as AB's sole lawyer (presumably, Soll has moved on to other work).
Refrigerator Gnome	voiced by Alton Brown	A garden gnome with a stereotypical accent that lives in Brown's refrigerator and teaches safety with regard to refrigerator management, usually poking fun at AB for bad sanitation.

==== Real ====
Name	Specialty	Role on the show
Shirley Corriher	Author, chef, self-labeled "mad" food scientist	Shirley appears on the show to help explain the scientific processes behind cooking. She is the author of CookWise, the Hows and Whys of Successful Cooking, which won the 1998 James Beard Award for Food Reference and Technique.
Deborah Duchon	Nutritional anthropologist	Duchon is from the Department of Anthropology and Geography at Georgia State University, who helps explore the history of the episode's topic. In later seasons she tends to appear out of nowhere, with Brown reacting in mock fear to the words "nutritional anthropologist" appearing in the script. She is probably the most featured expert on Good Eats, appearing in many episodes since part of the show is normally dedicated to exploring the history of a food. Generally, Brown ends his scenes with Duchon by asking her, "how do you like your (food of the day)?" One fourth season episode ("Chile's Angels") featured a character called "Debbie Duchon" who was supposed to be Duchon's daughter. In fact, she was Brown's fictional creation when Duchon was not available for filming. The character led to a bemused reaction from Duchon when fans of the show asked her about her "daughter." Duchon died on October 14, 2019, from glioblastoma, a form of brain cancer.
Caroline Connell	Dietitian	Connell (and other similar experts) tend to appear on episodes where Brown features a food that has positive health effects, and uses nutritionist's data as evidence. She appears many times in the first seasons, but now it seems that Brown retrieves his information from many specialists who only come on the show once or twice.
Carolyn O'Neil; The Lady of the Refrigerator	Dietitian	O'Neil is a dietitian who occasionally shows up to discuss nutritional value of foods with Brown. She also plays The Lady of the Refrigerator (a parody of The Lady of the Lake), who occasionally appears in Brown's refrigerator to impart information about the food or cooking technique covered in the episode, and to tease and needle Brown. The lady in the refrigerator also has the ability to transverse space and time, after snapping her fingers to transport herself and Alton to medieval England in the episode "Corn The Beaf."
"Ma" Mae Skelton	Brown's grandmother	In addition to being referenced by Brown in several episodes, she appeared in "The Dough Also Rises," and baked biscuits alongside Brown. She also appeared in the first episode of season 2, "It's a Wonderful Cake" as number 7 of the secret food organization, mimicking SPECTRE from the James Bond movies, and gave Brown the idea for a fruit cake. She died in 2001.

Brown plays other roles from time to time, often consisting of him explaining something in the foreground while another Alton Brown demonstrates in the background (similar to the technique used to present B.A. Brown). Sometimes he participates in an on-screen skit to re-enact such topics as cavemen discovering cooking techniques, while providing a voice-over narrative. At other times Brown talks to another character played by himself, with the camera cutting between the two as each delivers his lines, for instance, when he is (also) playing a Government Agent.

== History ==
Two pilot episodes for Good Eats ("Steak Your Claim" and "This Spud's For You") aired on the Chicago, Illinois, PBS affiliate WTTW-TV in July 1998.

The show was discovered by Food Network when an executive saw a clip of the show on the Eastman Kodak website which used the clip to showcase a new type of film stock sold by the company. The show was picked up in July 1999 by Food Network, which then owned exclusive rights to the show. The back catalog of shows were added to the repeat rotation of sister network Cooking Channel in the fall of 2011, and Brown announced that his contract with Food Network had expired and moved to Cooking Channel in 2011.

New episodes aired on Wednesdays in the late evenings from 1999 to 2007, when they were moved to Mondays at 8 p.m. From July 9, 2007, until summer 2009, at least two different episodes aired each weeknight (8 p.m. and 11 p.m., along with late-night replays at 2 a.m.), with a third airing on Wednesday nights at 8:30 p.m.; additional episodes were occasionally added (usually coinciding with a Food Network series or event).

On October 10, 2009, Good Eats celebrated its 10th anniversary with an hour-long live stage show aired on the Food Network. Guests included Ted Allen of Food Detectives and Chopped. One of the demonstrations in the show proved that a fire extinguisher was not a unitasker, as Brown constantly repeated in regular episodes that the fire extinguisher was the only unitasker in the kitchen.

On the January 4, 2010, episode, Good Eats revealed Brown's changed eating habits that led to his losing 50 pounds (23 kg) in 9 months. Brown emphasized that he was not on a diet in the modern American sense of the word (a temporary change in eating habits), but in the original Greek meaning (a permanent shift). Brown went on to describe a regimen that prescribes certain healthful foods with specific degrees of regularity (daily, once every two days, etc.) while proscribing unhealthy foods. Prescribed foods included breakfast every day (usually a fruit smoothie), oily fish, whole grains, etc. The episode comically claimed the entire story was in Brown's new book, Buff Like Me.

== Reception ==
Good Eats was nominated for the James Beard Foundation's Best T.V. Food Journalism Award in 2000, and the series earned a Peabody Award in 2006. "Rarely has science been taught on TV in such an entertaining – and appetizing – manner as it is in Alton Brown's goofy, tirelessly inventive series."

In 2011, Brown was given the James Beard Award for Best TV Food Personality for his work on Good Eats.

== End of the first run ==
On May 9, 2011, Brown announced via his Twitter that he was "retiring" the show after 249 episodes, and there would be three new one-hour episodes to be produced and premiered in 2011. The back catalog of shows were added to the repeat rotation of sister network Cooking Channel in the fall of 2011, and Brown announced that his contract with Food Network had expired and moved to Cooking Channel in 2011.

The crew of the show with their families were shown at the end of the first hour-long episodes ("Right On Q") eating BBQ while Brown narrated that truly a BBQ is just an event meant to be shared with friends and family. In the special Thanksgiving episode of 2011, "Reromancing the Bird," favorite characters of the show—sister Marsha, niece Marsha Jr., neighbor Chuck, the southerner Uncle Colonel Bob Boatwright, the food agent Sid, Frances Andersen portraying Uncle Bob's nurse, and the Dungeon Master—reappeared for a last time as a final tribute to their contribution to the show. At the end of the final episode, for the first time in years, Brown did not finish the show with the line "see you next time on Good Eats." Instead, he said, "Stay dark, America," snapped his fingers, and the screen went dark.

The final episode of Good Eats, titled "Turn on the Dark," was aired February 10, 2012. Brown announced via Facebook earlier that day at approximately 2:00 p.m. EST:

Tonight at 8pm: The final, oh so special installment of Good Eats. It's an hour-long ep called "Turn on the Dark". Chocolate fans take note. Repeats at 3am on the 11th, then Feb 12 at 7pm then Feb 13 at 11am. And yes, I'm kinda sad.

— Alton Brown via Facebook at approximately 2:00 PM EST

When asked about the end of the show on the August 29, 2012, episode of The Nerdist Podcast, Brown stated "I've put Good Eats into cryogenic holding. I'm not saying it's gone. I didn't shoot it in the head, I didn't kill it, but after 13 solid years of production, I needed a break."

In an interview with Larry King, Brown said "I crossed the 250-episode line, and I realized that I was tired. It was a very stressful show to make; it was completely scripted, we did between 300 and 600 pages of research. I can only do 22 a year, because they were very involved. We shot them like movies, single-camera I crossed that line, and I also kind of saw the writing on the wall, I think, which was that the era of the instructional or educational culinary show was frankly coming to an end in primetime. I think I saw that primetime food shows were going to go to competitions and reality. I would have rather put it out to pasture than be cancelled."

== Good Eats: The Return and Good Eats: Reloaded ==
Brown addressed the future of Good Eats at the end of a video he posted to his official Facebook page on July 16, 2015. In response to fan questions, Brown replied: "You want to see Good Eats again? Get in touch with the Food Network. Tell them you want it. Tell them I sent you."

On Alton's 2016 book tour, he stated Good Eats will have a "sequel," and it would be released the next year on the Internet.

On September 3, 2017, at the annual Dragon Con convention in Atlanta, Georgia, Alton Brown announced the successor of Good Eats. The new 30-minute show, then titled Good Eats: Return of the Eats, would air on the Food Network while additional content would be available online. Brown made the announcement while surrounded by several members of the production and on-air teams responsible for Good Eats, including Vickie Eng, Widdi Turner, and Lucky Yates. Return of the Eats was to debut in 2018, but was pushed back to 2019. On June 3, 2019, Brown announced via social media that the show, now titled Good Eats: The Return, would debut Sunday, August 25, at 10 pm ET. The first episode was, however, premiered early on Food Network's official YouTube channel on August 21, 2019, before its television debut. The episode reached number one on the worldwide YouTube trending list within hours.

On October 15, 2018, Cooking Channel premiered a spin-off series, Good Eats: Reloaded, featuring Brown revisiting 13 past episodes of the series with new scenes and recipes reflecting advancements in techniques and knowledge since their original airings. The second season, spotlighting and re-working 13 more episodes, premiered on April 13, 2020.

On August 6, 2020, Brown announced on Facebook that a new season of Good Eats: The Return had begun production, with new episodes due out either in late 2020 or early 2021. This second season premiered as a Discovery+ exclusive in early 2021, but by June 2021 had started airing on Food Network alongside a special Alton-led Chopped tournament called "Alton's Maniacal Baskets". A special one-hour Halloween-themed episode, "The House That Dripped Chocolate", aired on October 8, 2020. On July 13, 2021, the final episodes of Good Eats: The Return aired on Food Network; Brown commented on his Facebook page that these episodes would not only be the end of Good Eats: The Return but the conclusion of all Good Eats programming.

== Books ==
American publishers Stewart, Tabori and Chang released three separate volumes compiling the bulk of recipes featured on the television show. All of the recipes were transcribed and updated by Alton Brown. The first book, Good Eats: The Early Years was released in October 2009 and featured an original cover art by illustrator Michael Koelsch. It covered the first 80 episodes. The second book, Good Eats 2: The Middle Years was released a year later in October 2010 and featured an original cover art by illustrator Jim Salvati depicting Brown in a James Bond spoof. It covered episodes 81 through 164 and was packaged with a bonus DVD. The third book, Good Eats 3: The Later Years, was released another year later in October 2011 and featured an original cover art by illustrator Michael Koelsch depicting Brown in an Indiana Jones spoof. It covered episodes 165 through 249.

In early 2011, the first two books were packaged into a boxed set titled Good Eats: Two-Volume Set – Episodes 1 Through 164. In October 2013, all three books were packaged into an updated boxed set titled Good Eats: Three-Volume Set – The Complete Episodes.

In June 2021, on an episode of his QQ online series, he said he was putting the finishing touches on the manuscript of what he called "the fourth and final Good Eats book", which will presumably cover recipes from "Turn on the Dark" (the final original Good Eats episode which was not included in The Later Years) and both seasons of Good Eats: The Return.

Title	Number in Series	ISBN	Publisher	Date
Good Eats: The Early Years	1	ISBN 978-1-58-479795-1	Stewart, Tabori and Chang	October 2009
Good Eats 2: The Middle Years	2	ISBN 978-1-58-479857-6	Stewart, Tabori and Chang	October 2010
Good Eats: Two-Volume Set – Episodes 1 Through 164	1–2	ISBN 978-0-81-099822-3	Stewart, Tabori and Chang	2011
Good Eats 3: The Later Years	3	ISBN 978-1-58-479903-0	Stewart, Tabori and Chang	October 2011
Good Eats: Three-Volume Set – The Complete Episodes	1–3	ISBN 978-1-61-769105-8	Stewart, Tabori and Chang	October 2013
Good Eats 4: The Final Years	4	ISBN 978-1-41-975352-7	Abrams Books	April 2022
