= Deborah Duchon =

American anthropologist (1949–2019)

Deborah A. Duchon (June 24, 1949 – October 14, 2019) was an American anthropologist and Food Network personality. She was also the Director of Nutrition Education for New Americans Project and Director of the Center for Research and Anthropology at Georgia State University.

== Early life ==
Deborah Duchon was born on June 24, 1949, in Covington, Kentucky, and grew up in Cleveland, Ohio.

She graduated from Ohio University in 1971. She received her MA in anthropology from Georgia State University.

== Career ==
Duchon co-founded the company Attorneys' Personal Services with her husband Paul Tamaroff soon after their marriage in 1988. Her later work in anthropology was described in The Atlanta Journal-Constitution as, "work in instructing emergency workers including police and first responders in cross cultural communication, and food related nutritional guidance".

Her academic work as a researcher and teacher at Georgia State University also focused on the Hmong people of Southeast Asia within their expat community in the United States. At the university, she also served as the Director of Nutrition Education for New Americans Project, a joint group hosted by the Geography and Anthropology departments, as well as the Director of the Center for Research and Anthropology. Duchon was also the founder of Culinary Historians of Atlanta.

Duchon gained fame for her recurring role on Alton Brown's Food Network television series Good Eats. She appeared on NPR's radio show Morning Edition.

== Death ==
Duchon died as the result of glioblastoma on October 14, 2019.
