= Boning knife =

Type of kitchen knife

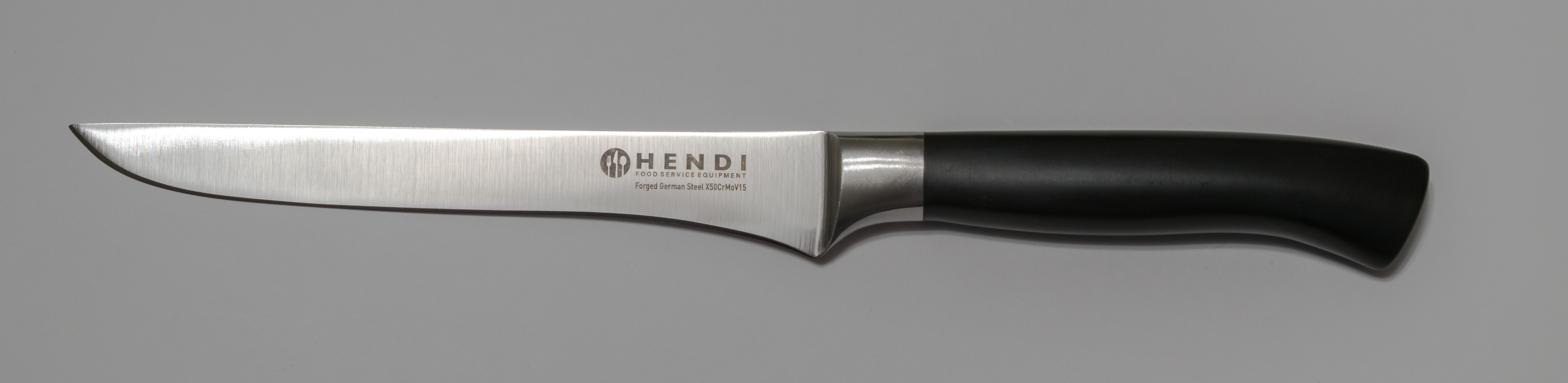
A stainless-steel boning knife

A boning knife is a type of kitchen knife with a sharp point and a narrow blade. It is used in food preparation for removing the bones of poultry, meat, and fish. Generally, 12 cm to 17 cm (5 to 6 ½ in) in length (although many brands, have been known to extend up to 9 ½ inches), it features a very narrow blade. Boning knives are not as thick-bladed as some of other popular kitchen or butcher knives, as this makes precision boning, especially deep cuts and holes easier. A stiff boning knife is good for boning beef and pork, but a very flexible boning knife is preferred for poultry and fish.

Some designs feature an arched blade to enhance the ease of a single-pass cut in removing fish flesh from its bones. For fish, the curved knife with a bit of flex is used to give control to cut around the skin, flesh and bone. Many professionals have two different knives, one for filleting and one for skinning. Length of the knife can vary between seven and nine inches.
