= Candy thermometer =

Cooking thermometer for sugar solutions

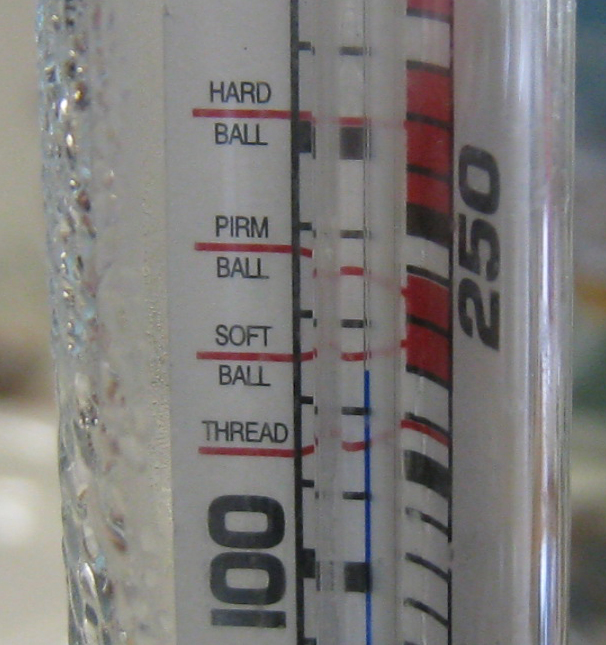
Detail of a candy thermometer

A candy thermometer, also known as a sugar thermometer or jam thermometer, is a cooking thermometer used to measure the temperature and therefore the stage of a cooking sugar solution. (See candy making for a description of sugar stages.) A candy thermometer is similar to a meat thermometer but can read higher temperatures, usually 400 °F/200 °C or more. Candy thermometers can also be used to measure hot oil for deep frying since it can reach higher temperatures than a normal thermometer.

Candy thermometers have been used by the general public since World War I, although they had been available to professional candymakers earlier than that and were mentioned as early as 1896 in Fannie Farmer's Boston Cooking-School Cook Book. Before, cooks had to use the "water test," i.e., placing a portion of syrup into cold water to judge its temperature.

Types of candy thermometers include liquid thermometers, coil spring or "dial" thermometers that use a bimetallic strip, and digital thermometers, which are often more precise. They may include a clip to attach the thermometer to the side of the saucepan. Some thermometers have markers indicating which stage the sugar is at, and alarms that go off after a given temperature is reached.

== See also ==
- Candy making
- Meat thermometer
