= Meat thermometer =

Cooking tool

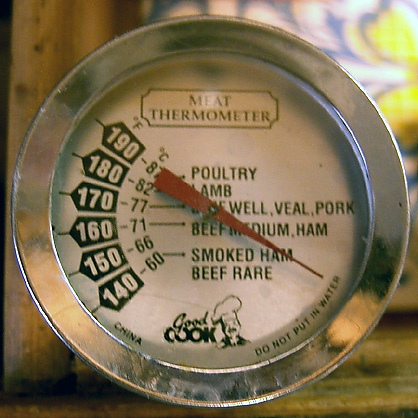
A meat thermometer with a dial. Notice the markings for each type of meat.

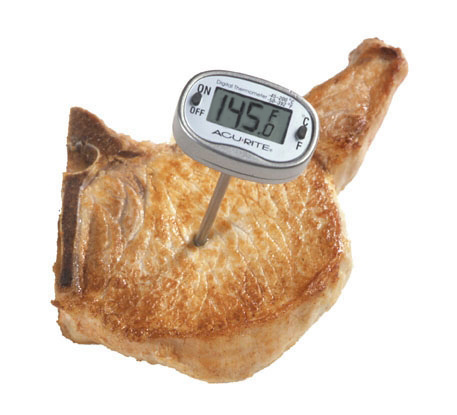
A digital food thermometer in pork

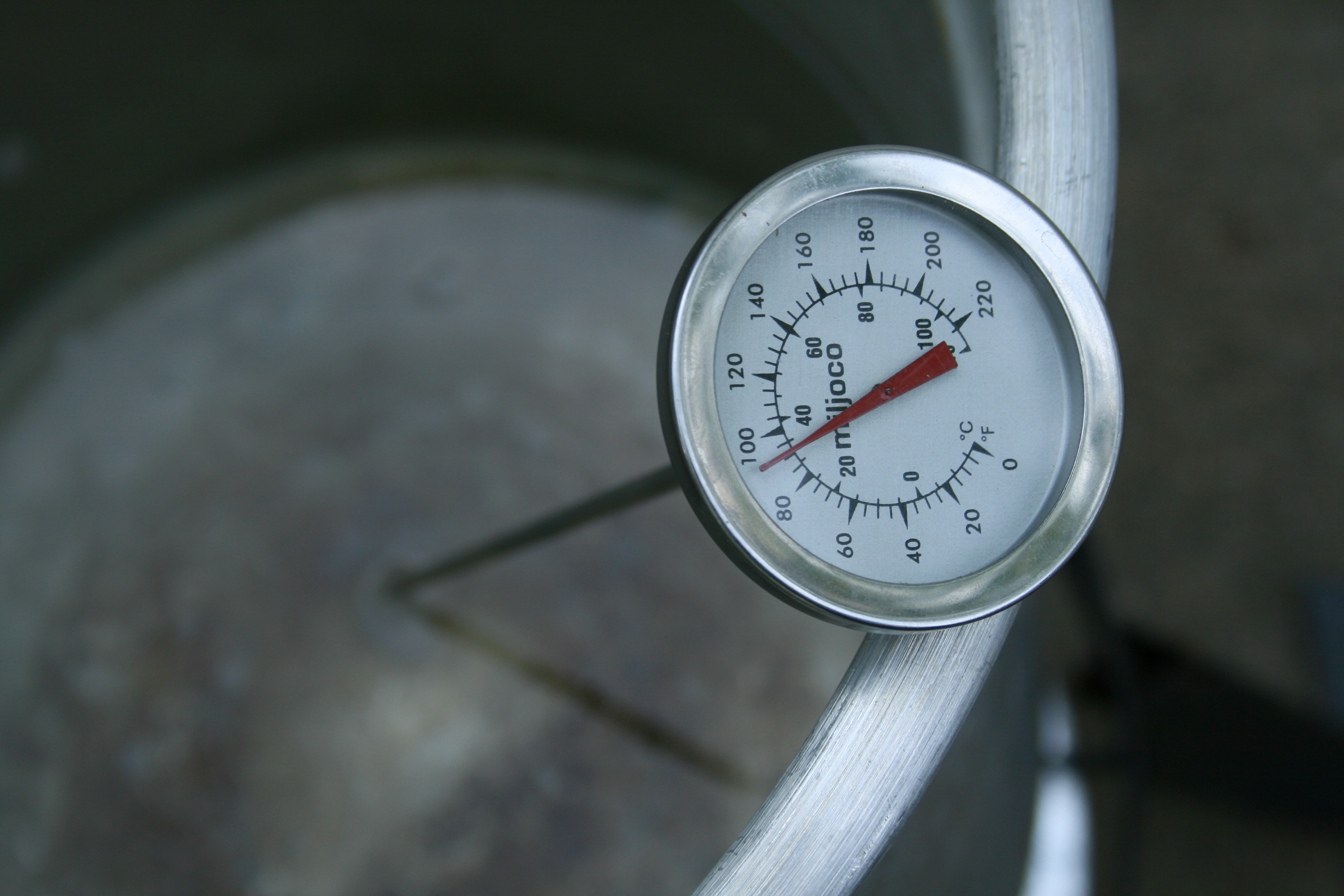
A food thermometer in water

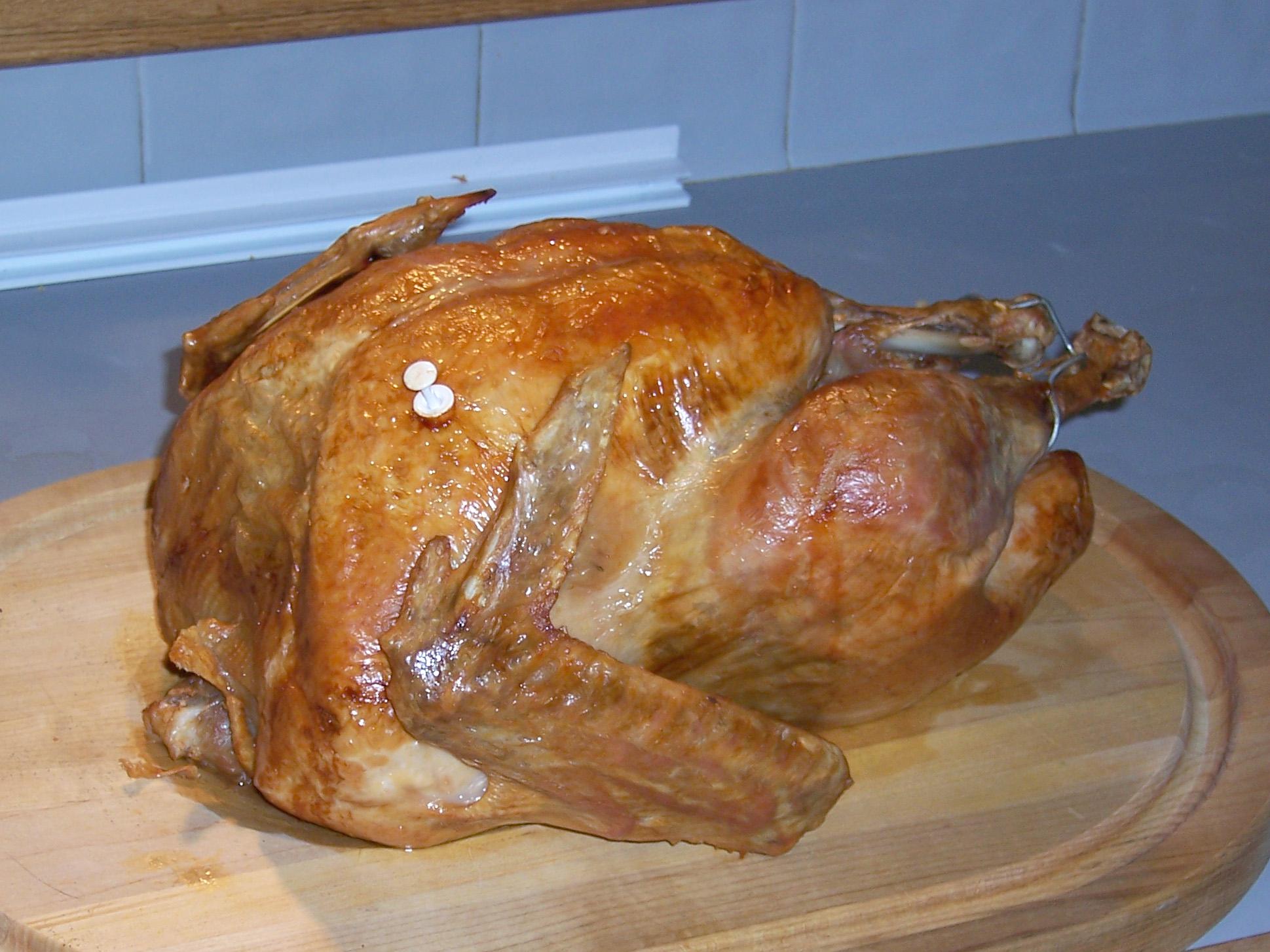
A roast turkey with pop-up thermometer (the white plastic object in the breast) in the popped position

A meat thermometer or cooking thermometer is a thermometer used to measure the internal temperature of meat, especially roasts and steaks, and other cooked foods. The degree of "doneness" of meat or bread correlates closely with the internal temperature, so that a thermometer reading indicates when it is cooked as desired. When cooking, food should always be cooked so that the interior reaches a temperature sufficient, that in the case of meat is enough to kill pathogens that may cause foodborne illness or, in the case of bread, that is done baking; the thermometer helps to ensure this.

== Characteristics ==
A meat thermometer is a unit which will measure core temperature of meats while cooking. It will have a metal probe with a sharp point which is pushed into the meat, and a dial or digital display. Some show the temperature only; others also have markings to indicate when different kinds of meat are done to a specified degree (e.g., "beef medium rare").

Meat thermometers are usually designed to have the probe in the meat during cooking. Some use a bimetallic strip which rotates a needle which shows the temperature on a dial; the whole thermometer can be left inside the oven during cooking. Another variety commonly used on turkey is the pop-up timer, which uses a spring held in by a soft material that "pops up" when the meat reaches a set temperature. Bimetal coil thermometers and pop-up devices are the least reliable types of meat thermometers and should not be trusted as a standalone meat thermometer.

Other types use an electronic sensor in the probe, connected by a flexible heat-resistant cable to a display. The probe is inserted in the meat, and the cable comes out of the oven (oven seals are flexible enough to allow this without damage) and is connected to the display. These types can be set to sound an alarm when the specified temperature is reached. Wireless types, where the display does not have to be close to the oven, are also available.

== Models ==
Meat thermometers have many different models, such as single probe and multiprobe.

Single probe models are usually the cheapest, but they can only monitor one section of the meat, which requires the probe inserted into different places to monitor the whole piece of meat. Multiprobe models are more expensive, and usually can connect 2–8 probes. More probes means the temperature of the whole piece of meat can be more accurately monitored.

== Use ==
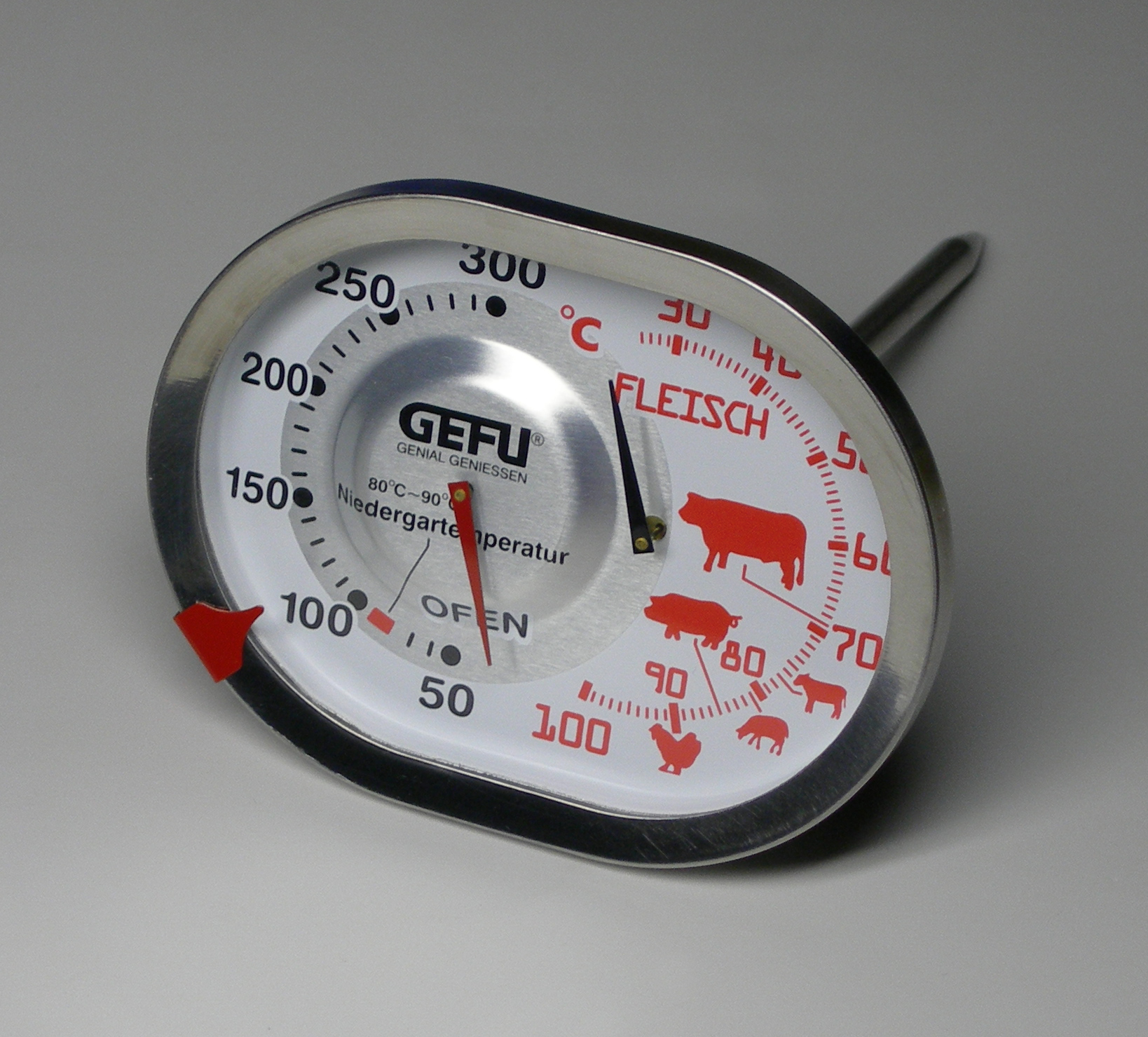
A meat thermometer with various cooking temperatures denoted for various meat types

The probe can be inserted into the meat before starting cooking, and cooking continued until the desired internal temperature is reached. Alternatively the meat can be cooked for a certain time and taken out of the oven, and the temperature checked before serving. The tip of the probe should be in the thickest part of the meat, but not touching bone, which conducts heat and gives an overestimate of the meat temperature.

=== Poultry ===
For poultry insert the meat thermometer into the thigh, but do not touch the bone. The suggested temperature for poultry to reach before it is safe to consume is 74 °C (165 °F), unless the poultry is stuffed, in which case the temperature in the center of the stuffing should be about 74 °C (165 °F).

=== Beef, lamb, or veal ===
For beef, lamb, or veal insert the meat thermometer away from bone, fat, or cartilage. The meat should reach a temperature of between 63 °C (145 °F) for medium-rare, and 77 °C (170 °F) for well done.

=== Pork ===
Pork needs to reach the same temperature 71 °C (160 °F) as beef, lamb, or veal and the same rules for use of the thermometer apply.

=== Ground meat ===
For ground meat, you should insert the digital food thermometer into the thickest part of the piece. For hamburgers you should insert the thermometer probe through the side of the patty, all the way to the middle. Make sure to check each piece of meat or patty because heat can be uneven. Temperature should be 71 °C (160 °F) for beef, lamb, veal, or pork and 74 °C (165 °F) for poultry.

=== Casseroles, and eggs ===
For casseroles, and eggs insert the thermometer into the thickest area. The temperature for casseroles should be 71 °C (160 °F) and for eggs 74 °C (165 °F).

=== Seafood ===
For fish the temperature should be 70 °C (158 °F). For shellfish (for example, shrimp, lobster, crab, scallops, clams, mussels and oysters) the temperature should be at 74 °C (165 °F).

== History ==
- In 1922, Lee F. Chaney, established the Ohio Thermometer Co., offering mercury based meat and candy thermometers, obtaining patents for elements of his designs.
- In 1939, George E Ford, of the Rochester Manufacturing Co. Inc., applied for a US patent for a bi-metallic Meat Thermometer.

== Other cooking thermometers ==
- Candy thermometer
