= Tournedos Rossini =

French steak dish

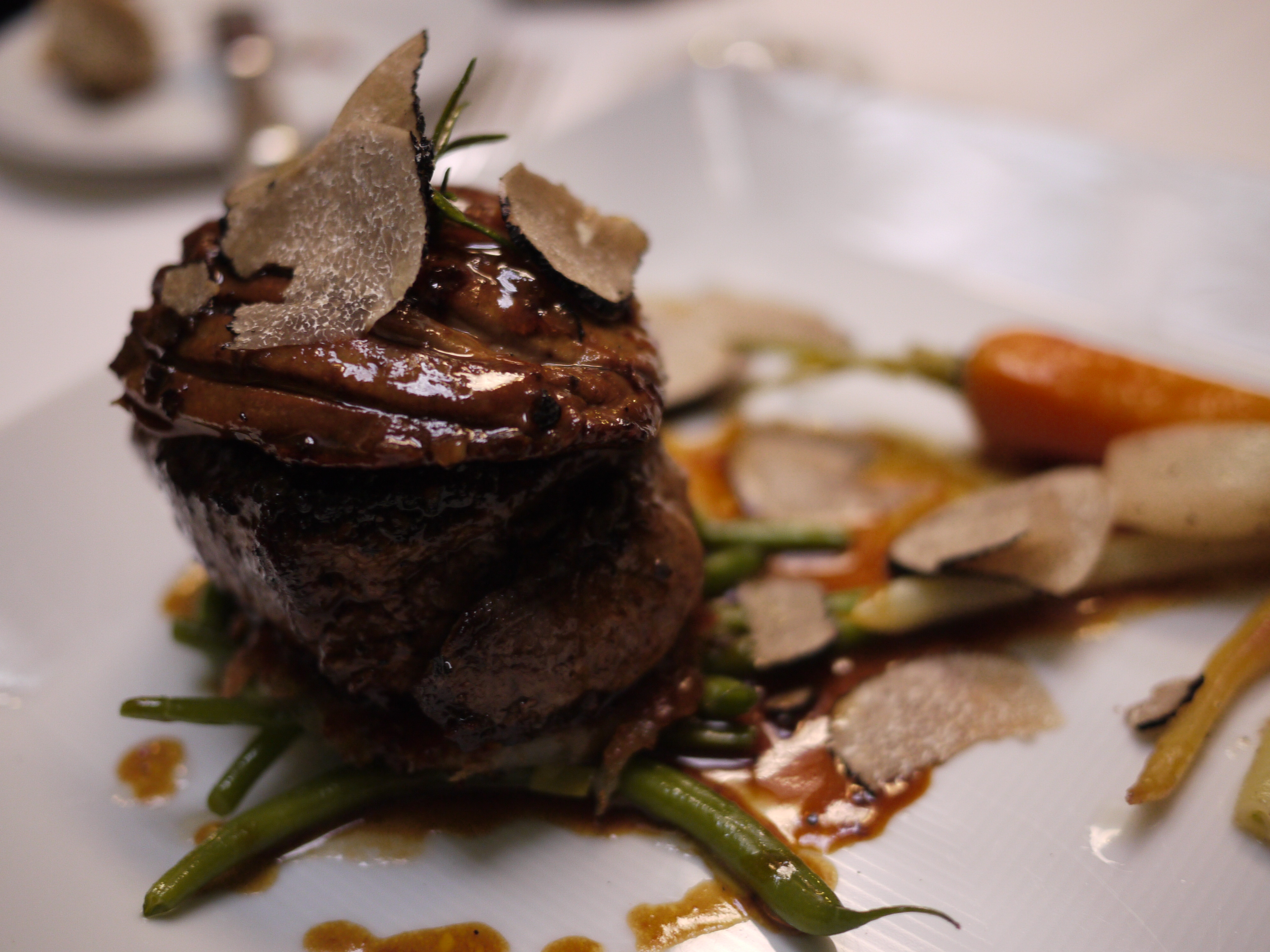
- Place of origin: France
- Created by: Marie-Antoine Carême
- Serving temperature: Hot
- Main ingredients: Beef tenderloin, filet mignon

Tournedos Rossini is a French steak dish consisting of beef tournedos (filet mignon), sautéed in butter, served on a croûton, and topped with a slice of fresh foie gras briefly sautéed at the last minute. The dish is garnished with slices of black truffle and finished with sauce madère, a Madeira-based sauce.

It is named after 19th-century composer Gioacchino Rossini. Its invention is attributed to French master chef Marie-Antoine Carême, or Adolphe Dugléré, or Savoy Hotel chef Auguste Escoffier.

== See also ==
- Medallion (food)
- List of beef dishes
