= Medallion (food) =

Type of meat cut

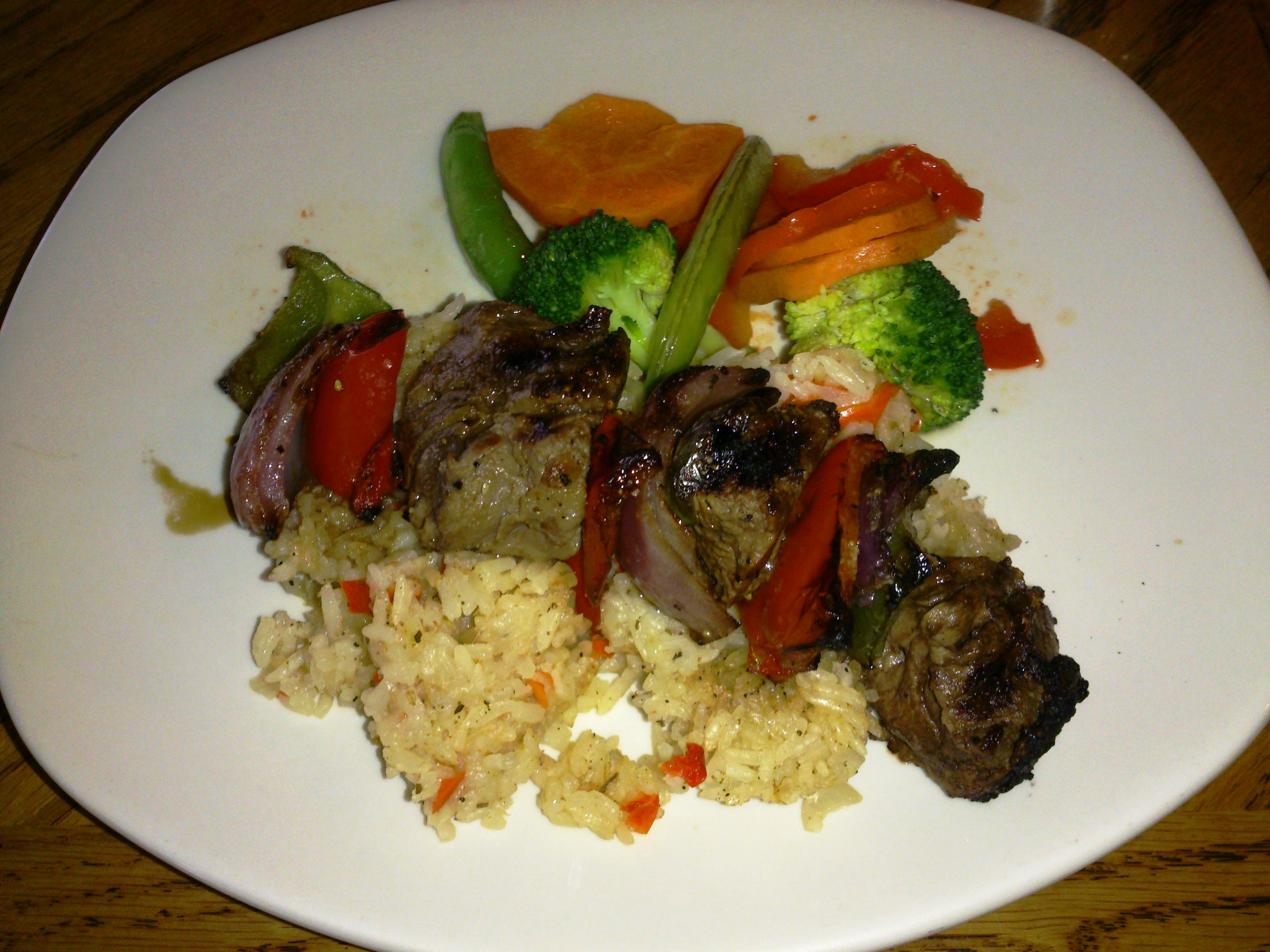
A dish of grilled beef medallions served with rice and vegetables.

In cuisine, a medallion is a relatively small, circular slice of meat from a fillet. It is preferably cut from the middle of the fillet so that the slice has a round shape.

In German food law (Lebensmittelrechtlich), the term is defined more broadly. Accordingly, a medallion is a small slice of meat that is not necessarily cut from the fillet, but can be cut from any section of muscle with little tendon that is suitable for quick frying. In the case of cattle, pigs, sheep, goats, and game, medallions can be taken from the back muscles or the hip, and from the chest muscles in the case of poultry. The type of animal is mentioned in the name (e.g. veal medallion, turkey medallion, pork medallion, venison medallion , beef medallion, etc.). On some menus, the term medallion is also used for the finest part of a fish or crustacean. For example, "lobster medallion" can refer to the inner, particularly tender part of the lobster claw.

== Filet medallion ==
A filet medallion is defined under German food law as a slice of veal fillet. The cut is comparable to a small veal fillet steak. Similar cuts from other animal species must – if the term fillet medallion is used – carry an additional note describing the type of meat (e.g. pork fillet medallion, venison fillet medallion, beef fillet medallion or alternatively, e.g. beef fillet medallion).

In the United States, filet medallions are typically cut around the end of beef tenderloin in thinner slices and smaller circles compared to filet mignon steak. Filet medallions are also referred to as filet steak medallions or eye filet medallions in the United States.

In French cuisine, beef medallions are referred to as tournedos, which are often cut from the end of the tenderloin and cooked in bacon and lard.

== See also ==
- Filet mignon
- Schnitzel
- Tournedos Rossini
- Grillades
