= Chateaubriand (dish) =

Front cut of a beef tenderloin

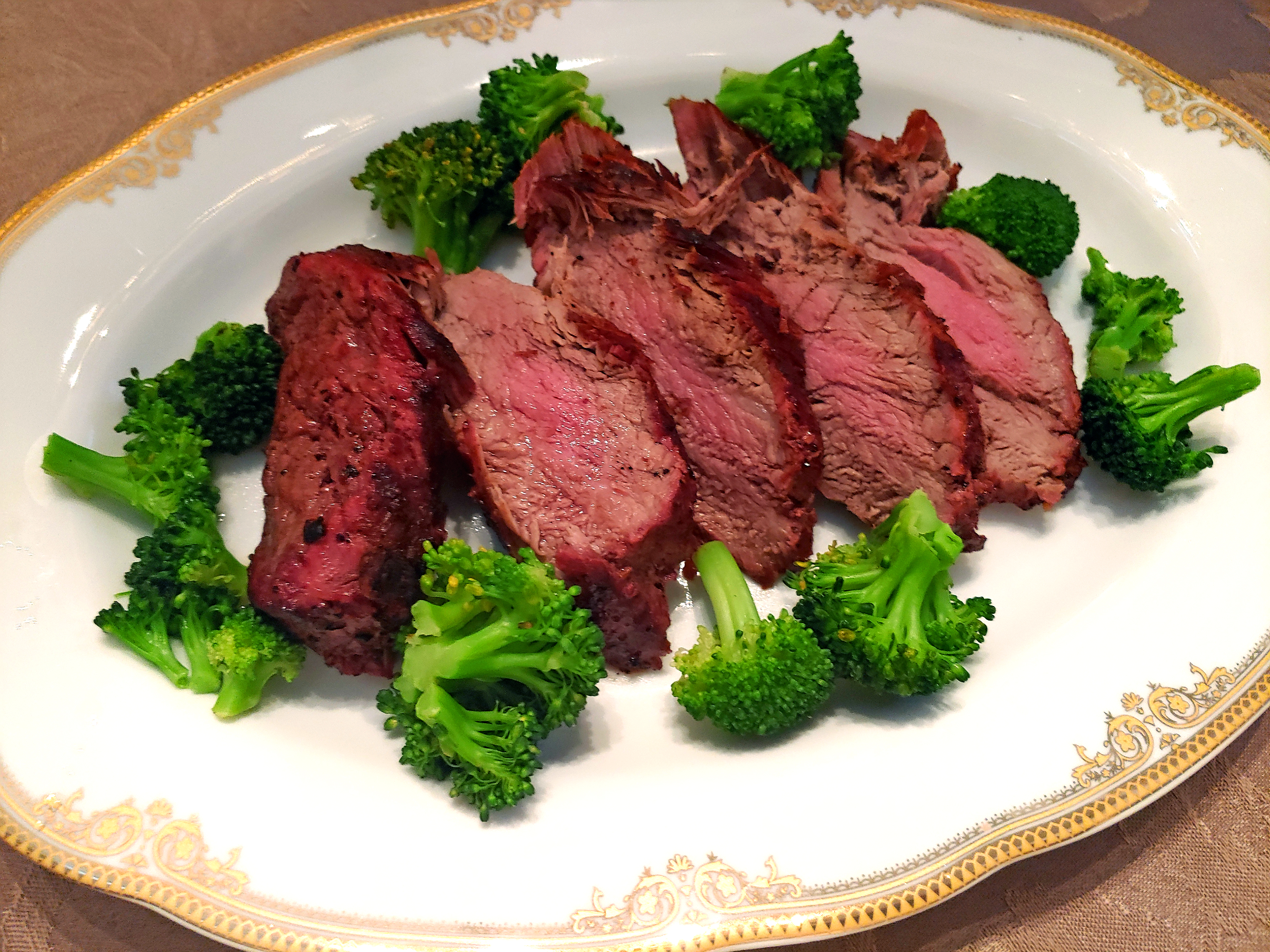
- Chateaubriand roast from the front cut of a beef tenderloin
- Type: Tenderloin cut of beef
- Place of origin: France
- Created by: Chef Montmireil named this dish after Vicomte François-René de Chateaubriand
- Serving temperature: Hot (45 to 50 °C (113 to 122 °F)) for rare meat served either on a hot plank or on a platter
- Main ingredients: Tenderloin front cut
- Variations: Planked Chateaubriand; Chateaubriand bouquetiere; Chateaubriand with duchesse potatoes; Chateaubriand sauce béarnaise; Chateaubriand sauce Colbert; Chateaubriand maitre d'hôtel Liée

Chateaubriand (French pronunciation: [ʃatobʁijɑ̃]; sometimes called chateaubriand steak) is a dish that traditionally consists of a large front cut fillet of tenderloin grilled between two lesser pieces of meat that are discarded after cooking. While the term originally referred to the preparation of the dish, Auguste Escoffier named the specific front cut of the tenderloin the Chateaubriand.

In gastronomy of the 19th century, the steak for Chateaubriand could be cut from the sirloin, and served with a reduced sauce named Chateaubriand sauce or a similar, that was prepared with white wine and shallots moistened with demi-glace, and mixed with butter, tarragon, and lemon juice. It was also traditionally served with mushrooms.

== Etymology and origins ==
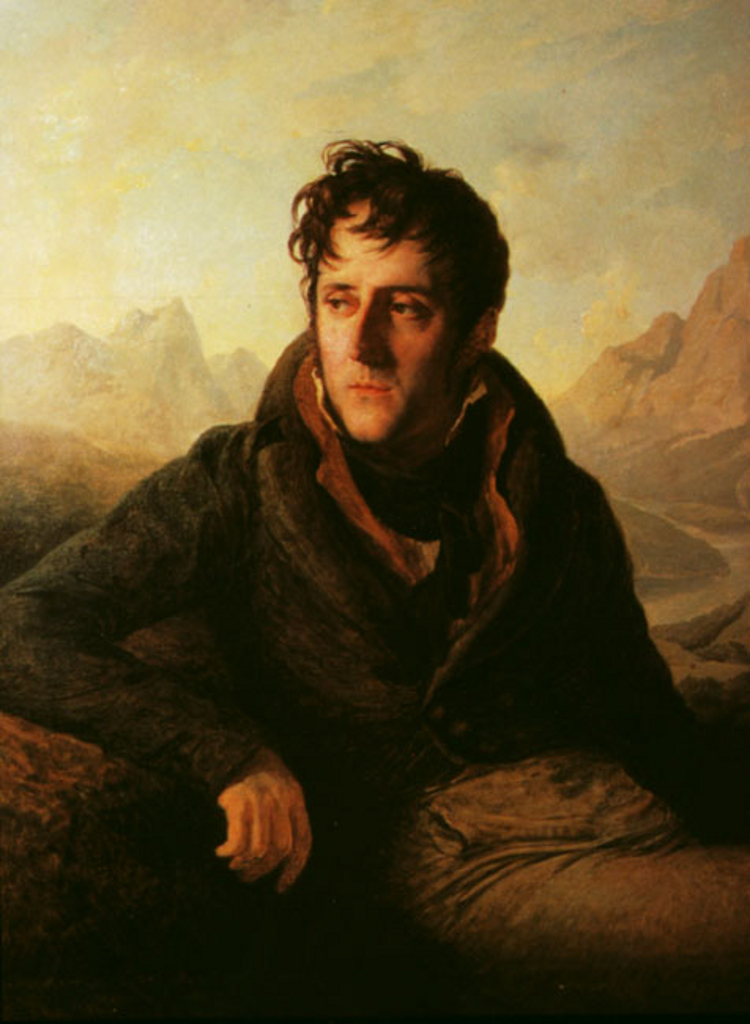
François-René de Chateaubriand

Chateaubriand is named after the French author François-René de Chateaubriand.

There are several stories about what the original dish was. With French origins, the Larousse Gastronomique indicates that the dish Chateaubriand was created in 1822 by Montmireil, the personal chef of the Vicomte François-René de Chateaubriand who was at that time ambassador of France in the United Kingdom. Montmireil also created what was originally called pudding a la Chateaubriand but would eventually be called simply pudding diplomate. An alternative spelling of the Vicomte's surname is Châteaubriant, which term the Dictionnaire de l'Académie des Gastronomes gives as the source of the beef-cattle bred at the town of Châteaubriant, in Loire-Atlantique, France.

Originally the term itself was applied to the manner of preparation of the meat; however, by the 1870s at its introduction to the English, the term was transferred to the steak or cut of meat itself. Steak originally called filet de bœuf was now served as Chateaubriand. Montmireil originally roasted the Chateaubriand between two lesser cuts of meat. This technique enhanced both flavor and juiciness of the steak.

=== Classic preparations ===
==== Delmonico's ====
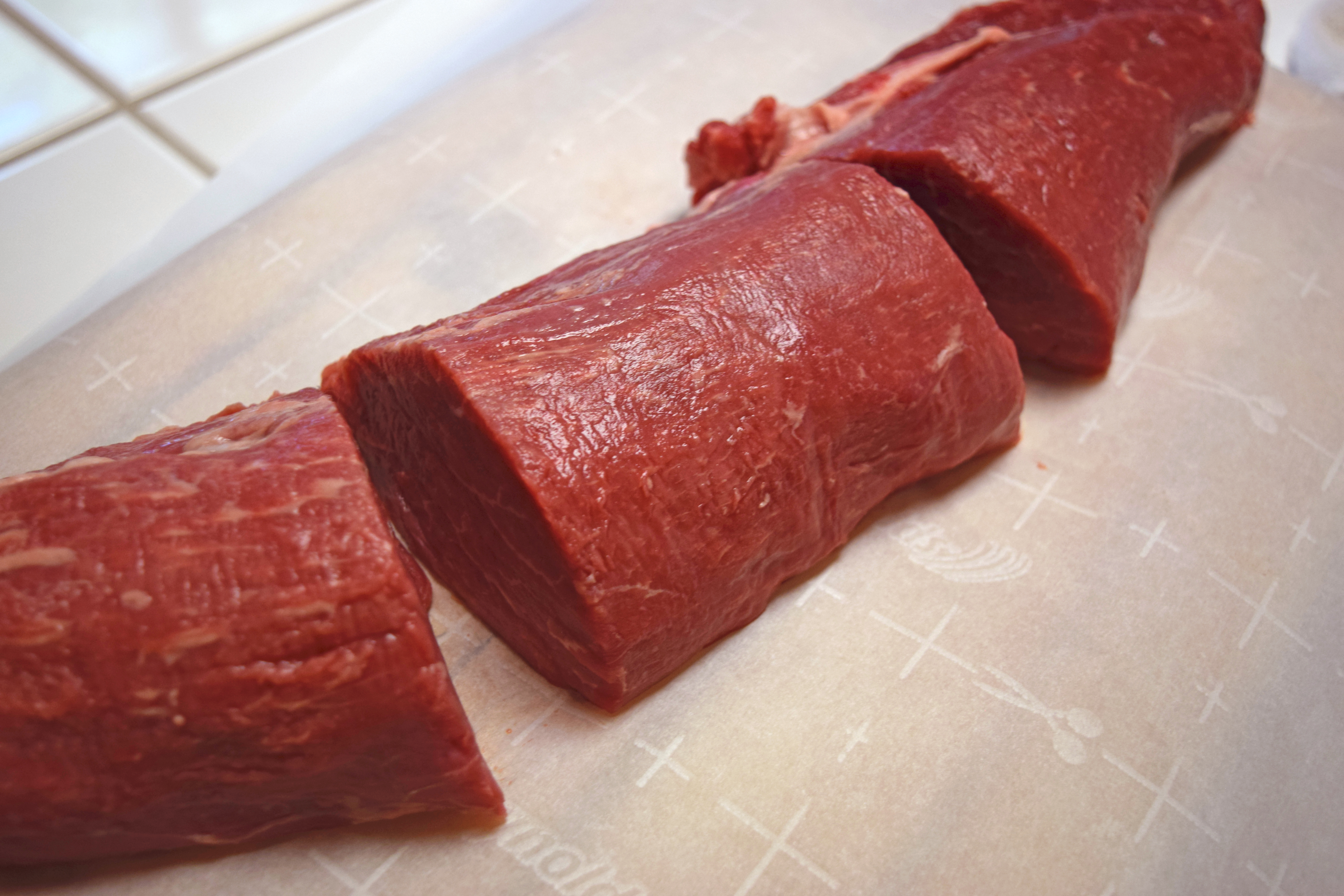
The center cut of a beef tenderloin, also called the Chateaubriand

New York's Delmonico's Restaurant opened in 1827 as a pastry shop by Giovani and Pietro Delmonico but quickly expanded in 1830 to a full French restaurant. Louis Napoleon visited New York in 1837 and was a regular patron. Among the items on the first menu was "Beef tenderloin with sauce". In 1893, Charles Ranhofer, the former chef at Delmonico's Restaurant, described the exact cut of meat for his preparation method as being the center cuts of the beef tenderloin. This center loin is described by Ranhofer as having been given the name Chateaubriand. In this 1893 method, a twenty-ounce (pound and a quarter) tenderloin center is flattened to 3 centimetres (1.2 in) and broiled over a slow but steady fire for 16 minutes for exceptionally rare, 18 minutes for medium, and 20 minutes for well done. The finished steak is served with maître d'hôtel butter or gravy.

==== Escoffier ====
French chef Georges Auguste Escoffier gave names to different steak cuts. Tournedos was the name given for the kernels of the fillet, cut into rounds. Escoffier states:

Chateaubriands are obtained from the centre of the trimmed fillet of beef, cut two or three times the thickness of an ordinary fillet steak. However, when it is to be cooked by grilling the Chateaubriand should not be more than 500 g (1 lb 2 oz) in weight as, if larger than this, the outside tends to become too dry and hard before the inside is properly cooked. In modern practice though, Chateaubriands are served with any of the sauces and garnishes suitable for Tournedos and fillet steaks.

While he gives the name to the cut of meat, Escoffier mentions the Vicomte François-René de Chateaubriand only as being the inventor of the sauce named after him. However, the Auguste Escoffier School of the Culinary Arts states:

Chateaubriand is actually a recipe which is usually grilled or broiled and served with Bearnaise and chateau potatoes, which are trimmed into olive shapes and sauteed in butter. It is normally cut from the center part of the tenderloin big enough for two people.

==== Planked preparation and presentation ====
In the February edition of the periodical Good Housekeeping published in 1917, in the article "The Plank versus the Platter" by Katherine Campion, the author states, "Until very recently, a Beefsteak Chateaubriand was always cooked and served on an oaken plank. But now the custom of broiling the steak and serving it from a silver platter has replaced the plank". The publication credits Vicomte François-René de Chateaubriand for originating the cooking method for his meats and game which were served with rich sauces and garnishes. Oak planks add a substantial amount of flavor to the meat and are practical for both hotel and home cooking. Planks were sold both plain and with silver tray stands for presentation. Some well constructed planks had carved grooves for the juices to channel into a shallow well. The author's instructions for preparation suggest thickly cut tenderloin, porterhouse, or rump steak. The meat is skewered into shape and broiled on one side. While the meat broils, the plank is placed into the hot oven to heat until smoking. When ready, remove the plank from the oven and butter. After the meat has cooked from 5 to 7 minutes, remove it from the broiler and place onto the plank, cooked side down. Mashed potatoes are then piped through a pastry bag with a rose tube directly onto the plank, surrounding the meat in a wavy border or other, more complicated, decoration. Stuffed bell peppers or, alternatively, stuffed tomatoes are arranged, one per person, pressed into the potato border. Sautéed mushrooms are added on top and the entire plank is placed back into a hot oven until the meat is cooked to liking and the potatoes are lightly browned and the vegetables tender. The meat is then seasoned with salt, pepper, and paprika with a little butter rubbed on the meat and a final garnishing with sprays of watercress is added.

== Modern preparations ==
By the 1950s in the United States, Chateaubriand became a treat for upscale guests in Las Vegas, Nevada, eventually becoming a staple of the local supper clubs referred to as gourmet rooms that were found on and off the Las Vegas Strip. According to Woman's Day magazine in 1966, "A Chateaubriand steak in most modern restaurants is a thick slice of tenderloin, larded with beef fat or bacon, and broiled to the desired degree of doneness (à point, as the French say), then served up with Chateaubriand Sauce."

In the 1985 book, Contemporary Cooking, by James Charlton, the dish "Chateaubriand with Duchesse Potatoes" is prepared by broiling the steak until not quite done and then placing the nearly cooked steaks onto a plank surrounded with mushrooms, tomatoes, and piped duchess potatoes around the meat and vegetables and then placed back into the broiler for the steak to finish and the potatoes to lightly brown.

== Accompaniments ==
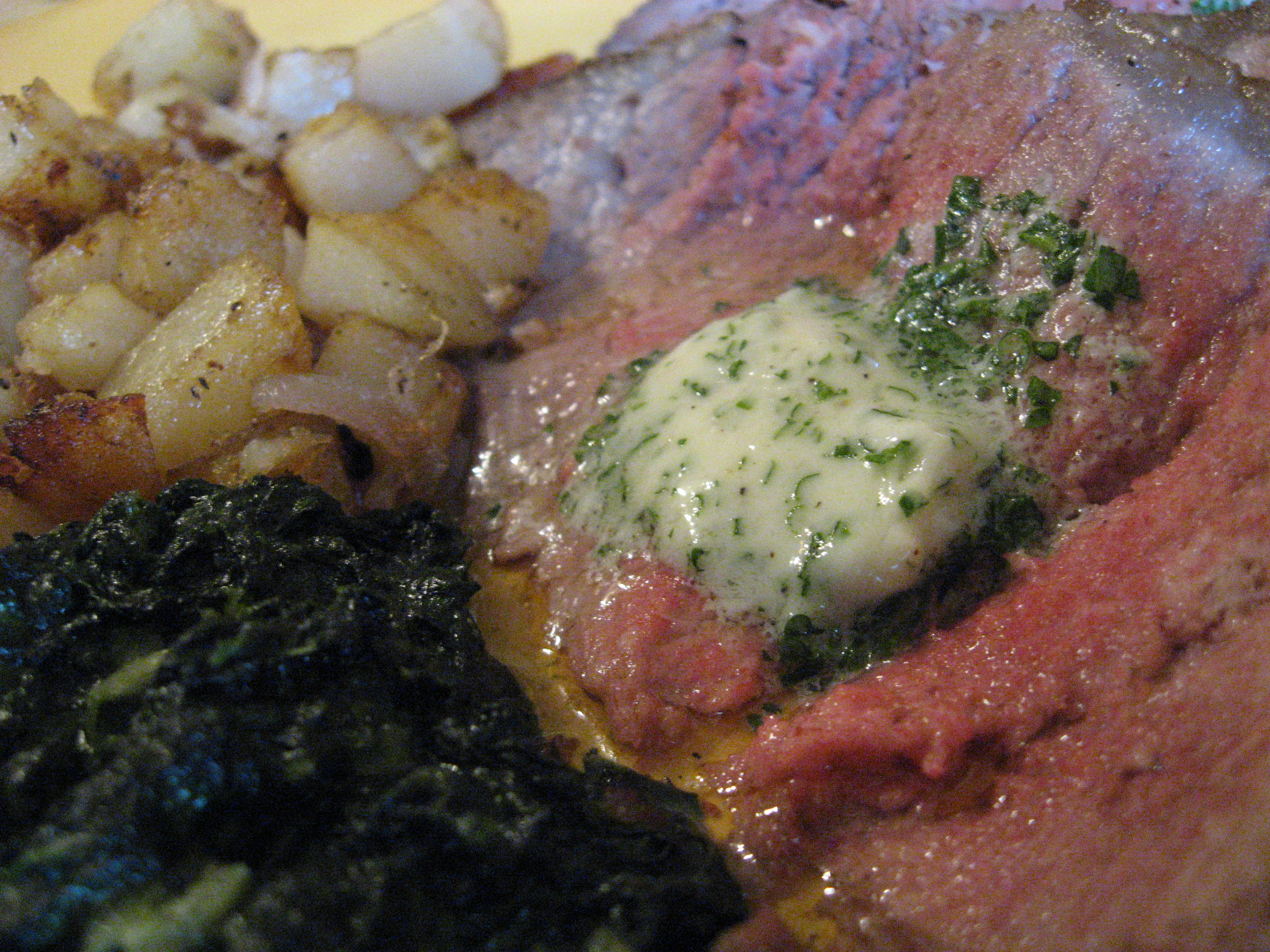
Maître d'hôtel butter

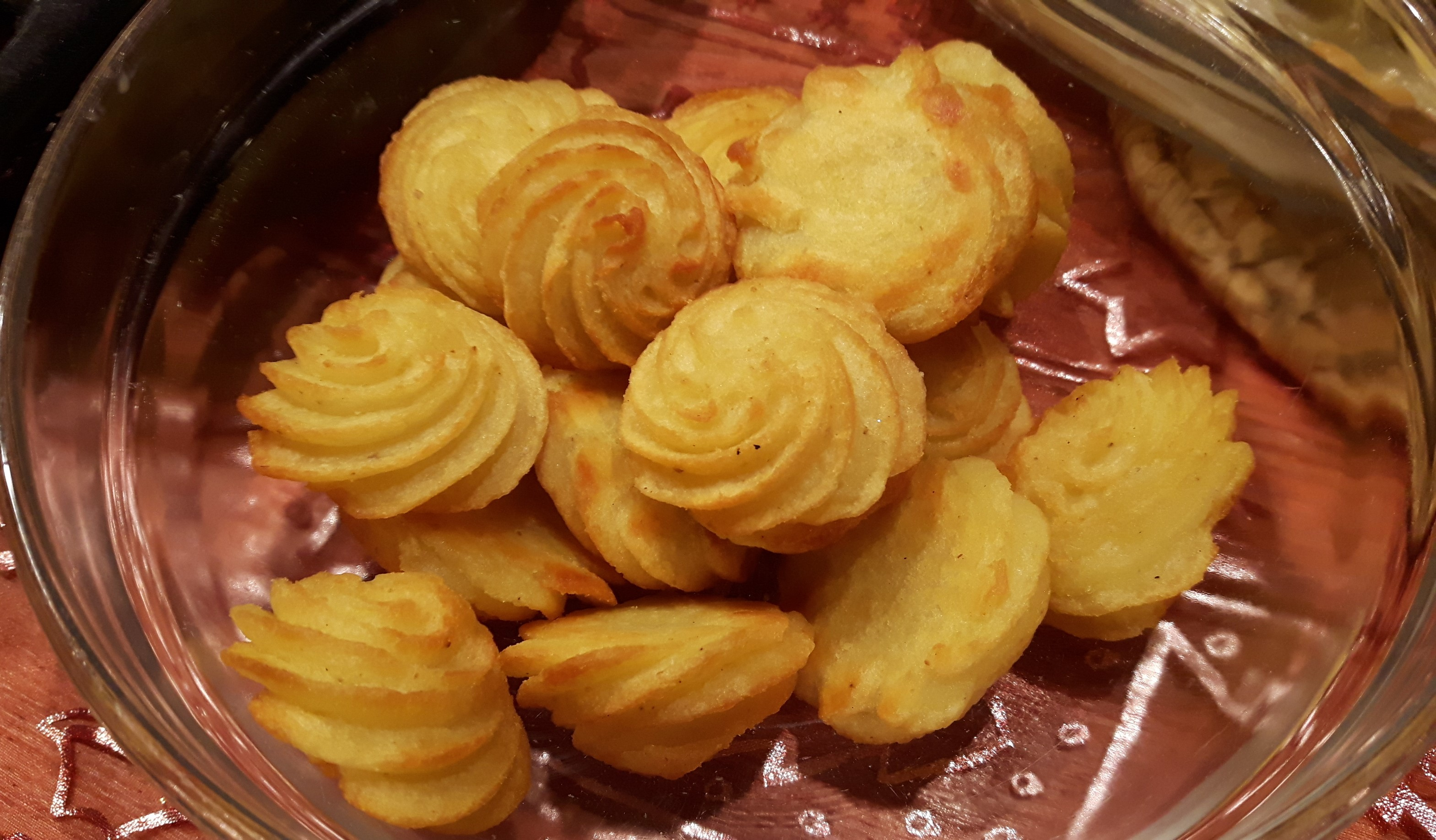
Duchess potatoes

- Maître d'hôtel butter
- Duchess potatoes
- Chateaubriand potatoes, also called chateau potatoes or pommes de terre château (potatoes sautéed in butter), is a tournée-cut potato that is 5 centimetres (2.0 in) in length.
- Bouquetière or à la bouquetière is an arrangement of vegetables around a roast to resemble flowers. Carrots, turnips, and potatoes browned in butter with cauliflower in Hollandaise sauce are often used as well as glazed olive-turned vegetables (cut to a perfect barrel shape) with a sherry-flavoured jus lié (juice that has been lightly thickened) on the side.

=== Sauces ===
- Chateaubriand sauce (sometimes referred to as "crapaudine sauce") is a culinary sauce that is typically served with red meat. It is prepared in a series of reductions, and typically accompanies Chateaubriand steak. Other dishes, such as tournedos villaret and villemer tournedos, also incorporate the sauce in their preparation. The origin of this sauce is subject to debate. Some credit its creation to chef Montmireil, while others speculate that it originated at the Champeaux restaurant following the publication of de Chateaubriand's book, Itinéraire de Paris à Jérusalem (Itinerary from Paris to Jerusalem). The sauce is prepared with shallots, mushroom, thyme, bay leaf, tarragon, white wine, brown veal stock and beurre maître d'hôtel (sweet butter infused with parsley). Additional ingredients may include meat glaze, demi-glace, pan drippings, onion, lemon juice, cayenne pepper, peppercorn and salt. The preparation involves cooking all of the ingredients together except for the brown veal stock and beurre maître d'hôtel, until it is reduced by two-thirds of the original content. After this, the veal stock is added in proportions equal to the amount of wine that was originally used before the reduction, and this mixture is then reduced to half its size. The final step is for the mixture to be strained and then topped with chopped tarragon and beurre maître d'hôtel. The sauce is commonly served with Chateaubriand steak prepared and served with potatoes. A dish that incorporates Chateaubriand sauce is tournedos villaret, in which mushroom caps are filled with the sauce and placed atop tournedos, all of which are placed atop tartlets filled with kidney bean purée. The sauce is sometimes served in a separate side dish, rather than atop meats, such as with the dish villemer tournedos, which is prepared with fried tournedos placed atop fried chicken croquettes, along with tongue, mushroom and truffle.
- Béarnaise sauce is commonly served with Chateaubriand. Châteaubriand sauce béarnaise is described as a double fillet steak with béarnaise sauce and is served with pommes fondantes.
- Colbert sauce, a béarnaise with added meat glaze (glace de viande) and the addition of reduced white wine.

== See also ==
- Haute cuisine
- List of steak dishes
- List of sauces
