= Compound butter =

Butter mixed with other ingredients

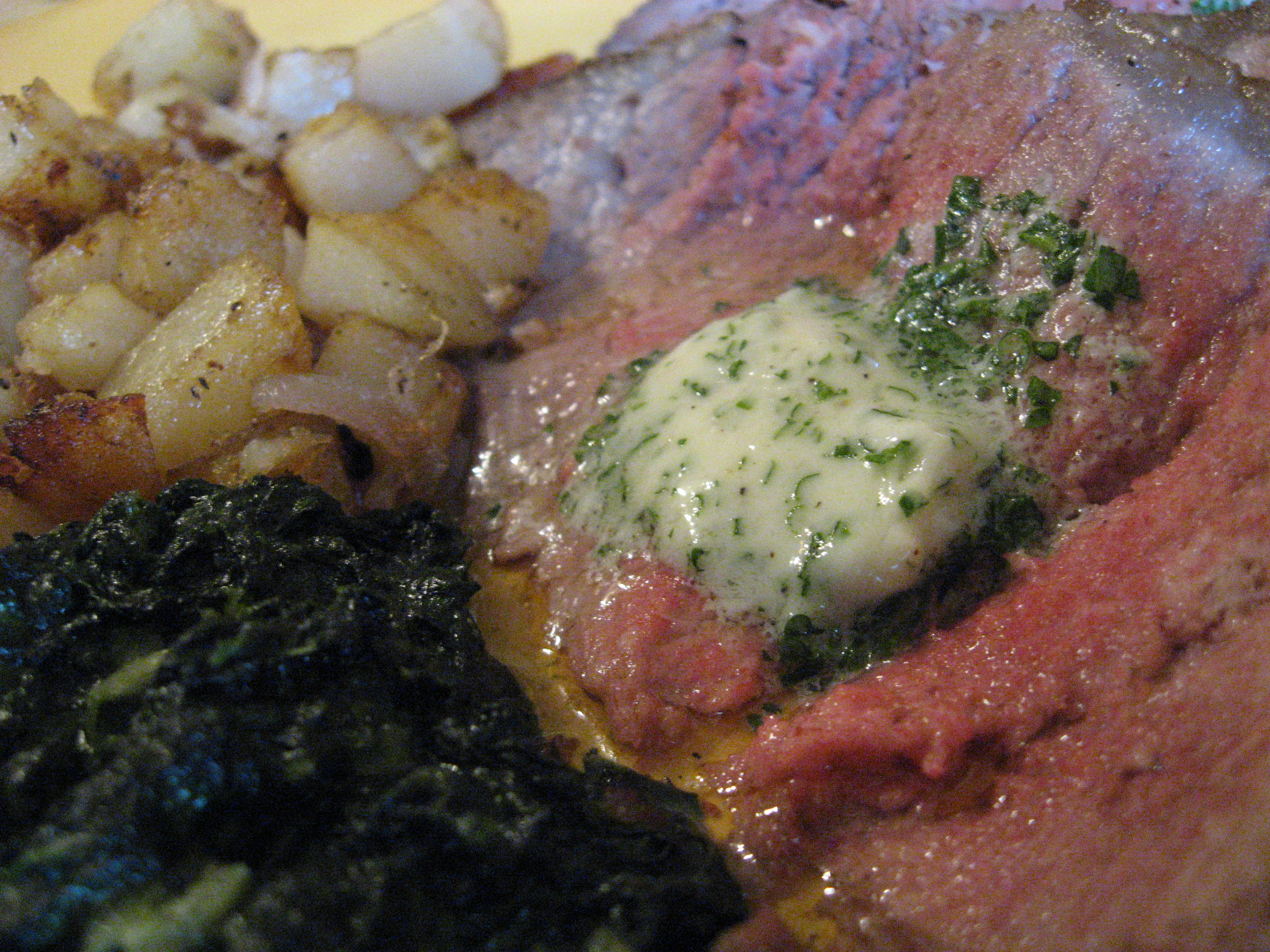
A New York strip steak topped with beurre maître d’hôtel, served with potatoes and creamed spinach

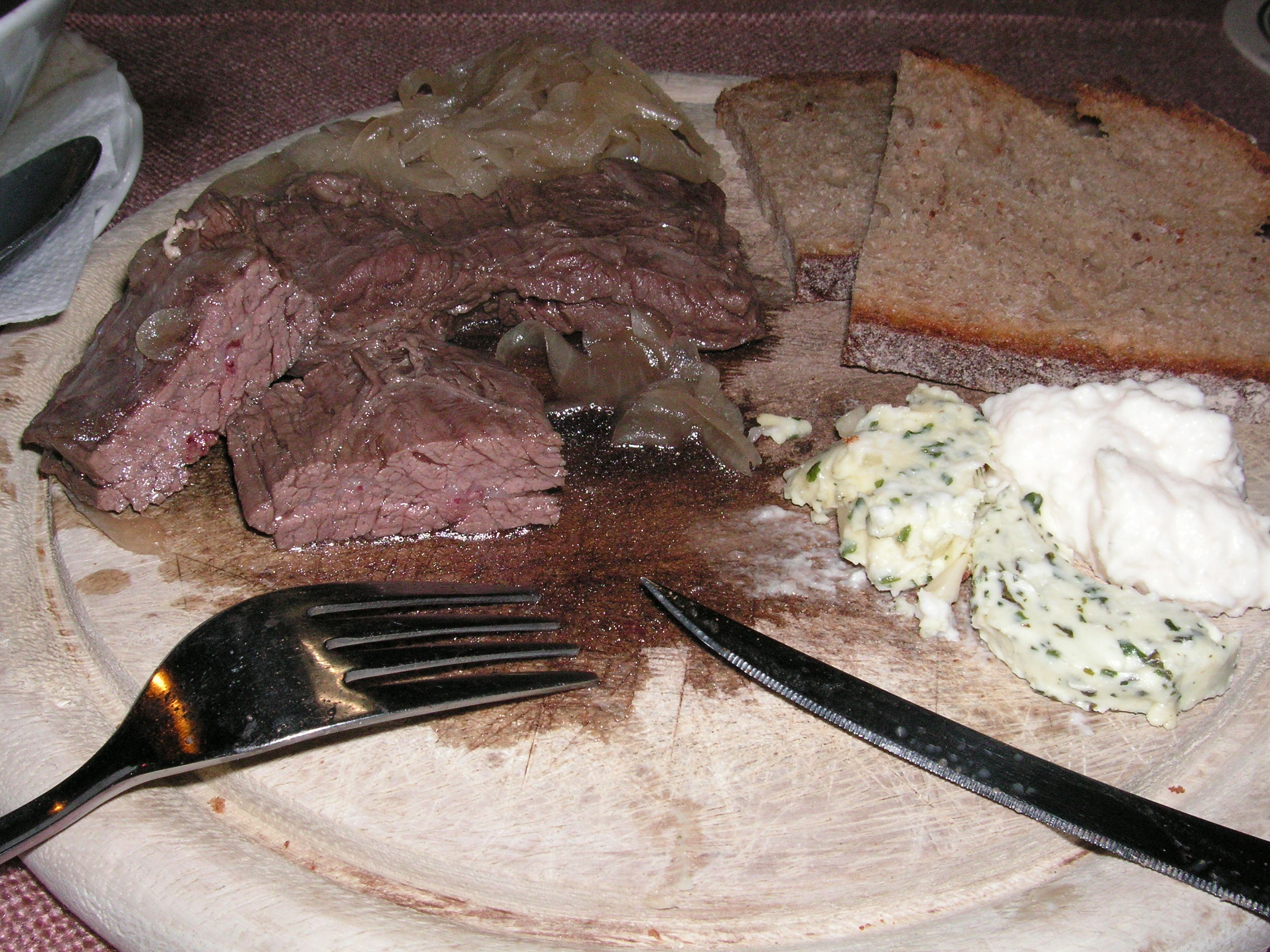
Kronfleisch (skirt steak), a traditional Bavarian dish. Served with onion rings, rye bread, compound butter (with herbs and garlic – beurre à la bourguignonne), and horseradish

Compound butters (French: beurre composé, pl. beurres composés) are mixtures of butter and other ingredients used as a flavoring, in a fashion similar to a sauce. Compound butters have a variety of uses. For hot dishes, a piece of cold compound butter is placed on top of cooked meat or fish before sending it to the table. Meat, fish, or mushrooms can be basted with them while cooking in an oven. Compound butters can be added as an enrichment in soups before serving. Chilled but malleable compound butters are used in pastry bags to make decorations for appetizers and cold dishes.

Compound butters are simpler to make than sauces, adding flavor to grilled or broiled meats, vegetables or slices of bread. Garlic or fresh herbs are classic ingredients. Less conventional butters are made by adding non-traditional ingredients. A compound butter can be made by whipping additional elements, such as herbs, spices or aromatic liquids, into butter. It is usually re-formed and chilled before being melted on top of meats and vegetables, used as a spread, or used to finish sauces.

American sweet cream butter has a neutral flavor and melts easily. Cultured European-style and Irish butter has a slightly tangy flavor from live cultures added to the cream before churning. The higher milk-fat content of cultured butter has a richer flavor, creamier texture and melts more slowly. Compound butter made from cultured butter will have a stronger flavor and hold its shape longer when placed on hot food.

Beurres composés include:

- Beurre d'anchois – anchovy butter
- Beurre Bercy – shallot butter with white wine
- Beurre à la bourguignonne – garlic and parsley butter
- Beurre au citron – lemon butter
- Beurre d'escargot
- Beurre d'échalote – shallot butter
- Beurre d'estragon – tarragon butter
- Beurre de fine herbes
- Beurre Maitre d'Hôtel – butter with parsley and lemon juice
- Beurre de moutarde – mustard butter
- Café de Paris butter
- Deconstructed Compound Butter – thin slices of butter are sprinkled rather than mixed with ingredients
- Garlic butter
- Miso butter – equal parts mild white or yellow miso and softened unsalted butter, grated ginger optional
- Truffle butter
- Worcestershire Butter – butter with Worcestershire sauce, thyme and garlic

== See also ==
- Beurre manié, butter kneaded with flour, used as a thickener in cooking
- Cannabis butter or cannabutter, butter blended with cannabis and water, generally used in baking.
- Egg butter
