= Maître d'hôtel =

Manager of the public part of a formal restaurant

Occupation
- Names: Head waiter, host, waiter captain
- Activity sectors: Waiting staff

Description
- Competencies: Training waitstaff, Supervising waiters, welcoming guests, assigning tables, managing reservations
- Fields of employment: Hospitality, foodservice
- Related jobs: Manager, waiter, maître d'

The head waiter of Restaurant Quadri, a Michelin-starred fine dining establishment in Piazza San Marco, overseeing service.

The maître d'hôtel (French for 'master of the house'; pronounced [mɛːtʁə dotɛl]) is the manager of the public part of a formal restaurant. As leader of the "front of house", they supervise and train the waiting staff, welcome guests and assign tables to them, take and manage reservations, and ensure that guests are satisfied. Other roles include supervising wine selections and helping chefs create menus.

== Terminology ==
In different countries or different restaurants, they may be called head waiter, host, waiter captain, or maître d' (UK: /ˌmeɪtrə ˈdiː/ MAY-trə DEE, also US: /ˌmeɪtər -/ MAY-tər -) .In North America, a maître d'hôtel is known as a dining room manager.

== Roles ==
Maitre d'hotel Gil Galasso carving roast meat for guests.

In large organizations, such as certain hotels, or cruise ships with multiple restaurants, the maître d'hôtel is often responsible for the overall dining experience, including room service and buffet services, while head servers or supervisors are responsible for the specific restaurant or dining room they work in. Food writer Leah Zeldes writes that the role of maître d'hôtel originated as a kind of combined "host, headwaiter and dining-room manager" and, in the past, persons with this role were sometimes responsible for such operations as tableside boning of fish and mixing of salads.

The role of head waiter (also known as a chef de salle) can sometimes occupy a distinct role when their role is not undertaken by a maître d'hôtel. When this occurs, the head waiter is solely responsible for oversight of dining room service.

== See also ==
- Beurre maître d'hôtel, a parsley butter
- Brigade de cuisine, a formal back-of-house (kitchen) hierarchy
- Concierge
- Hospitality
- List of restaurant terminology
- Majordomo
