= Fillet (cut) =

Cut or slice of boneless meat or fish

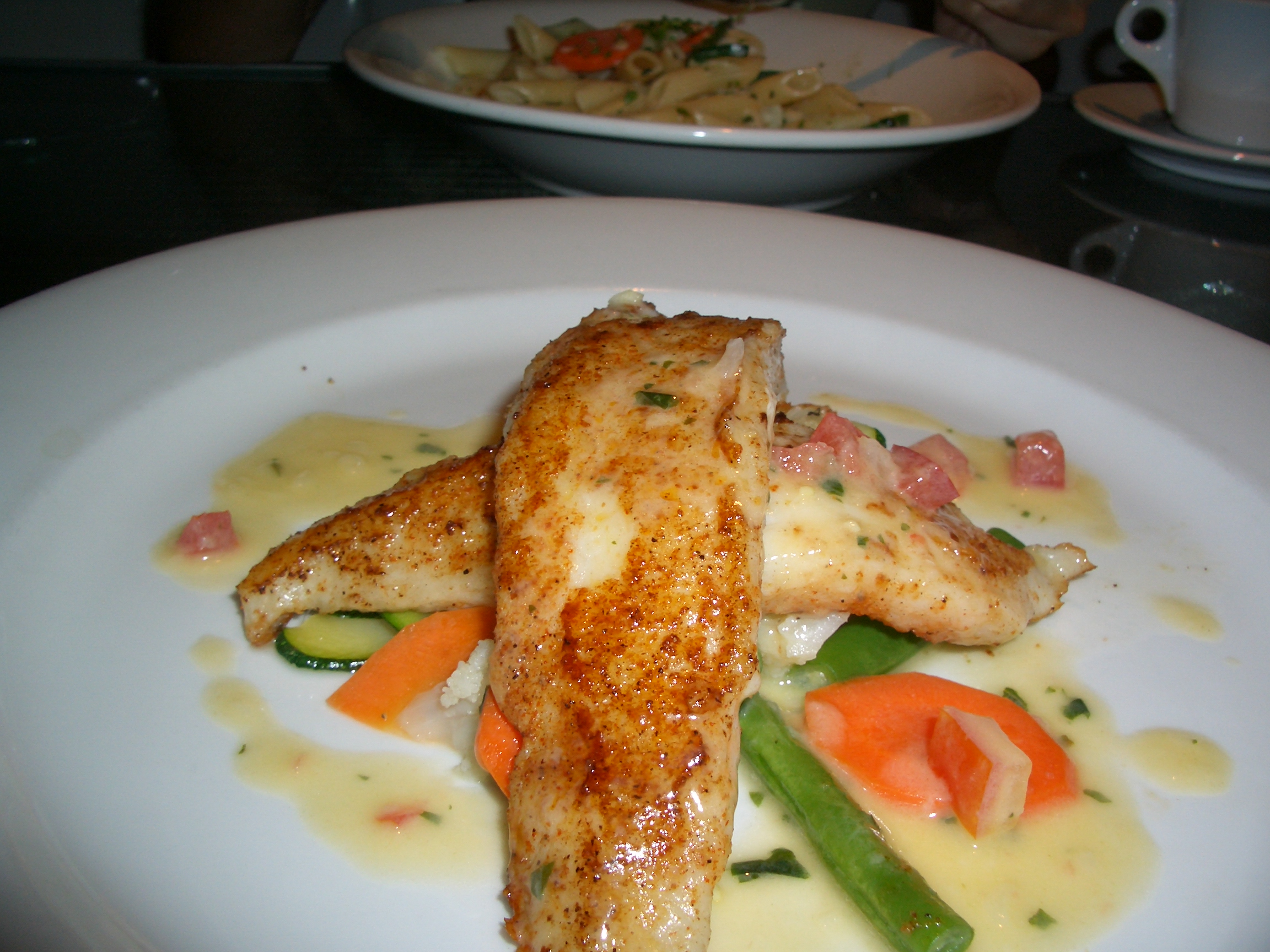
Fillets of John Dory

A fillet or filet (UK: /ˈfɪlɪt/ FIL-it, US: /fɪˈleɪ/ fil-AY; French loanword, pronounced [filɛ]) is a boneless portion of meat (including fish) cut from an animal. A cut or slice of meat is often a prime ingredient in many cuisines, and many dishes call for a specific type of fillet as one of the ingredients.

== Meat ==
=== Beef ===
In the case of beef, the term most often refers to beef tenderloin in the United States, especially filet mignon.

=== Chicken ===
Chicken fillets, sometimes called inner fillets, are a specific cut of meat from the chicken steaks. There are two fillets in a chicken, and they are each a few centimetres long and about 25 mm (1 in) or less wide. They lie under the main portion of the breast just above the ribcage around the center of the sternum. They are separated from the main breast by filament.

Chicken fillets are very popular in supermarkets in many countries. They can come attached to the main breast itself or separated from the breast in packages of generally four or more fillets.

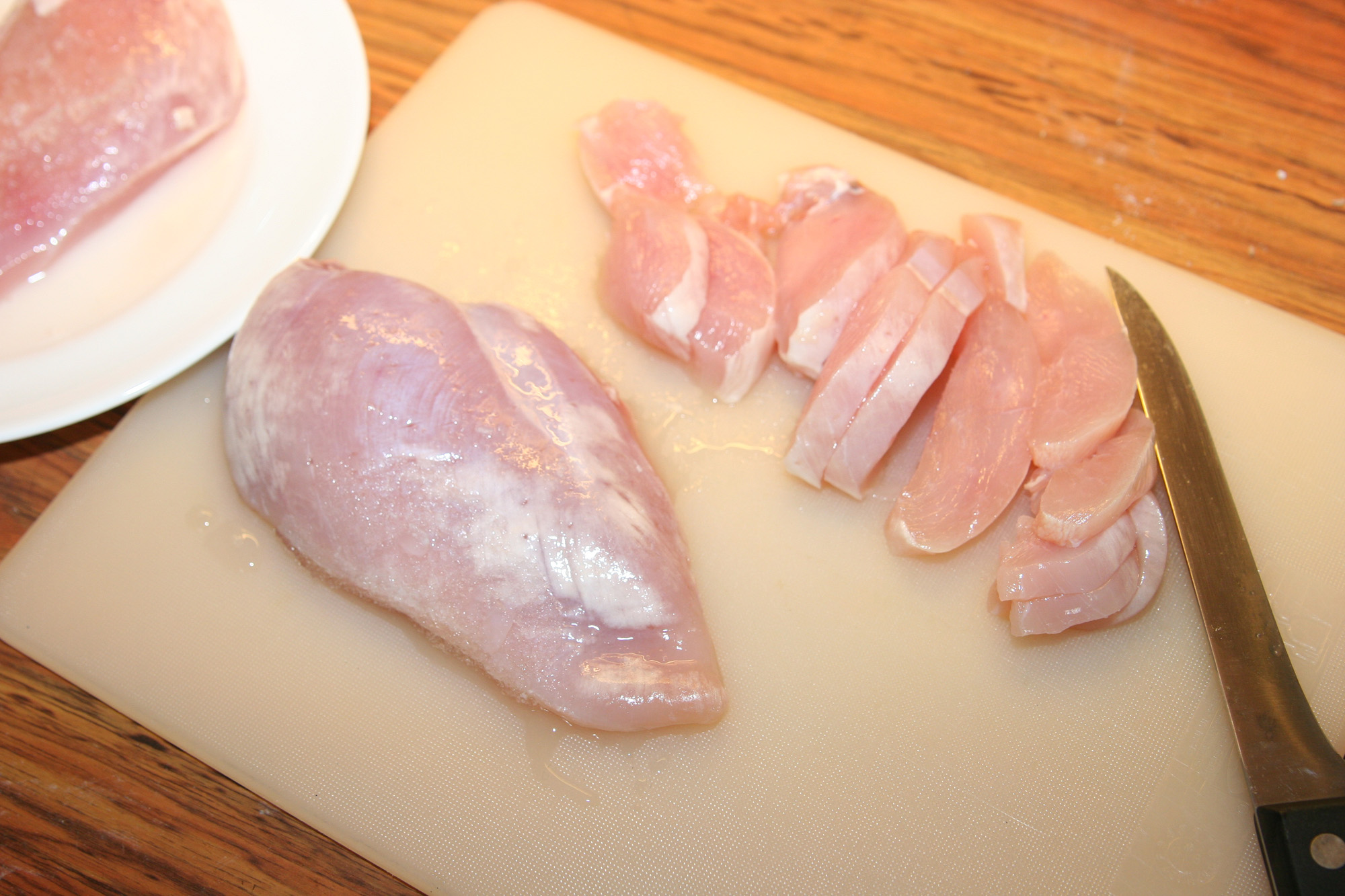
Raw chicken fillets

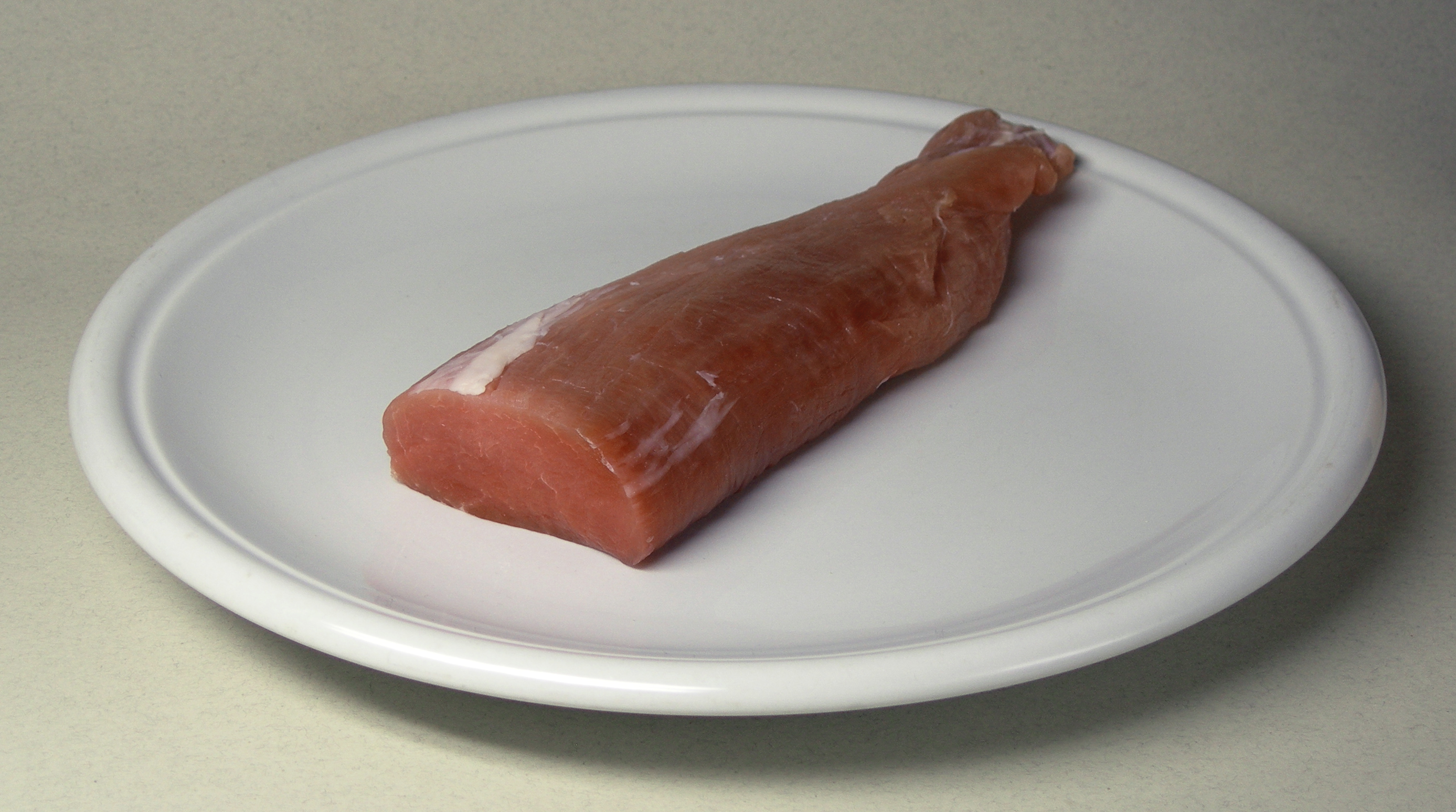
Filet of pork

== Fish ==
In preparation for filleting, the scales on the fish should be removed. The contents of the abdominal cavity (guts and other organs) also need careful detaching from the fillet.

Fish fillets are generally obtained by slicing parallel to the spine, rather than perpendicular to the spine. Cuts of fish performed perpendicular to the spine are known as steaks or cutlets, and often include bone. The remaining bones with the attached flesh is called the "frame", and is often used to make fish stock. As opposed to whole fish or fish steaks, fillets do not contain the fish's backbone; they yield less flesh, but are easier to eat.

Special cut fillets are taken from solid large blocks; these include a "natural" cut fillet, wedge, rhombus or tail shape. Fillets may be skinless or have skin on; pinbones may or may not be removed.

A fletch is a large boneless fillet of halibut, swordfish or tuna.

There are several ways to cut a fish fillet:

- Cutlet
  - This fillet is obtained by slicing from behind the head of the fish, round the belly and tapering towards the tail. The fish is then turned and the process repeated on the other side to produce a double fillet.
- Single
  - This fillet is more complex than the cutlet and produces two separate fillets, one from each side of the fish.
- "J" Cut
  - This fillet is produced in the same way as a single fillet but the pin bones are removed by cutting a "J" shape from the fillet.
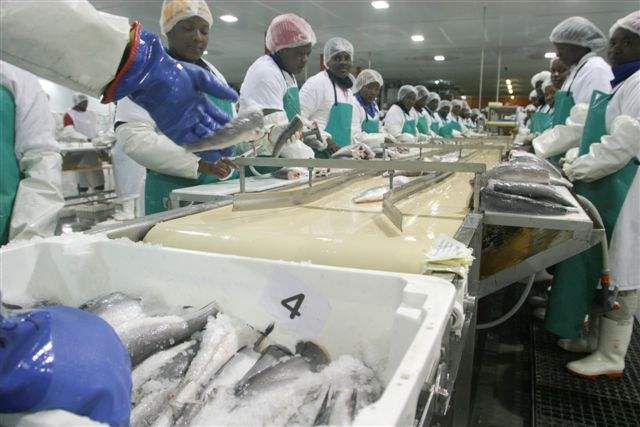
Filleting hake

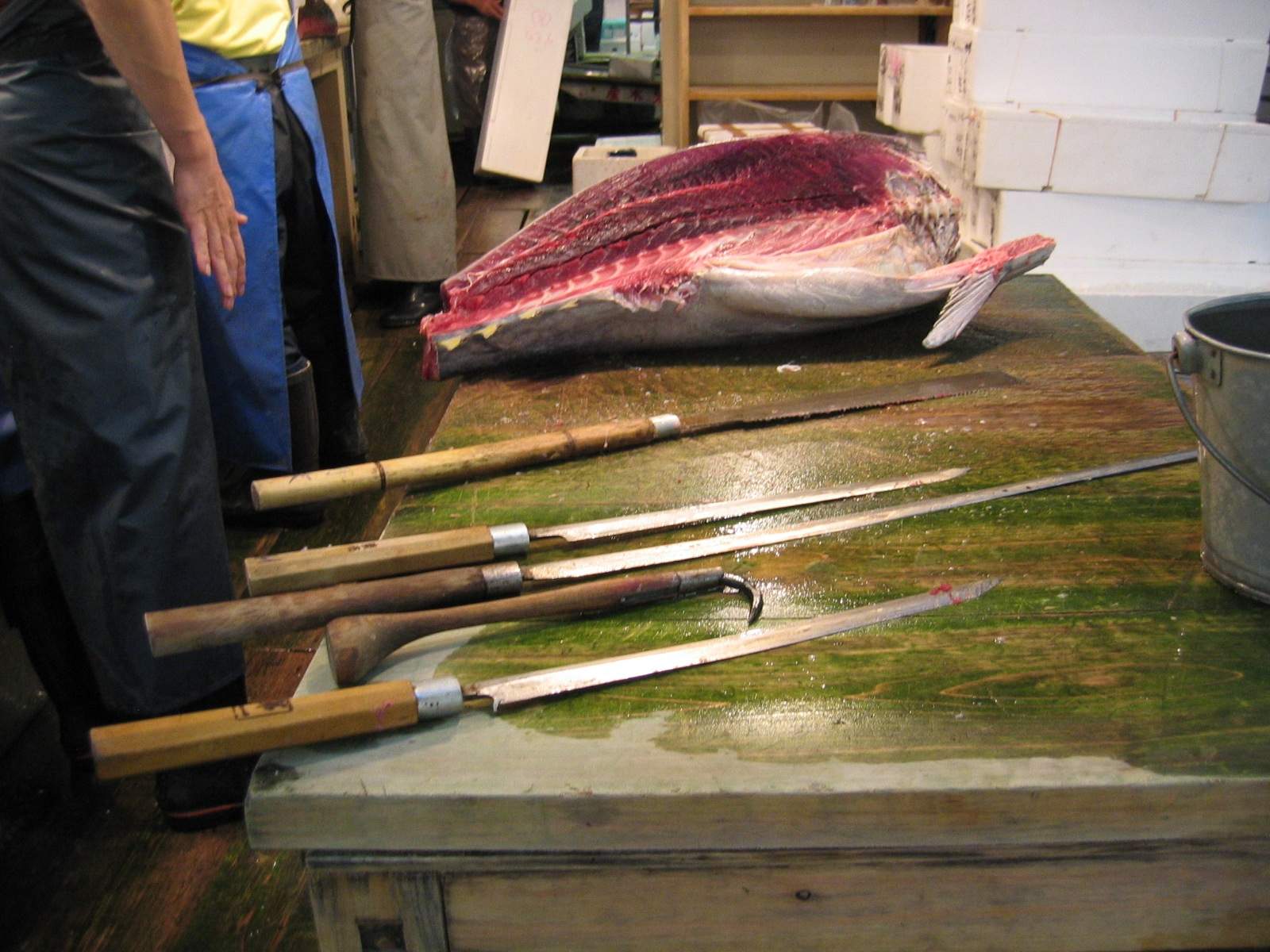
Japanese utensils used to fillet large tuna

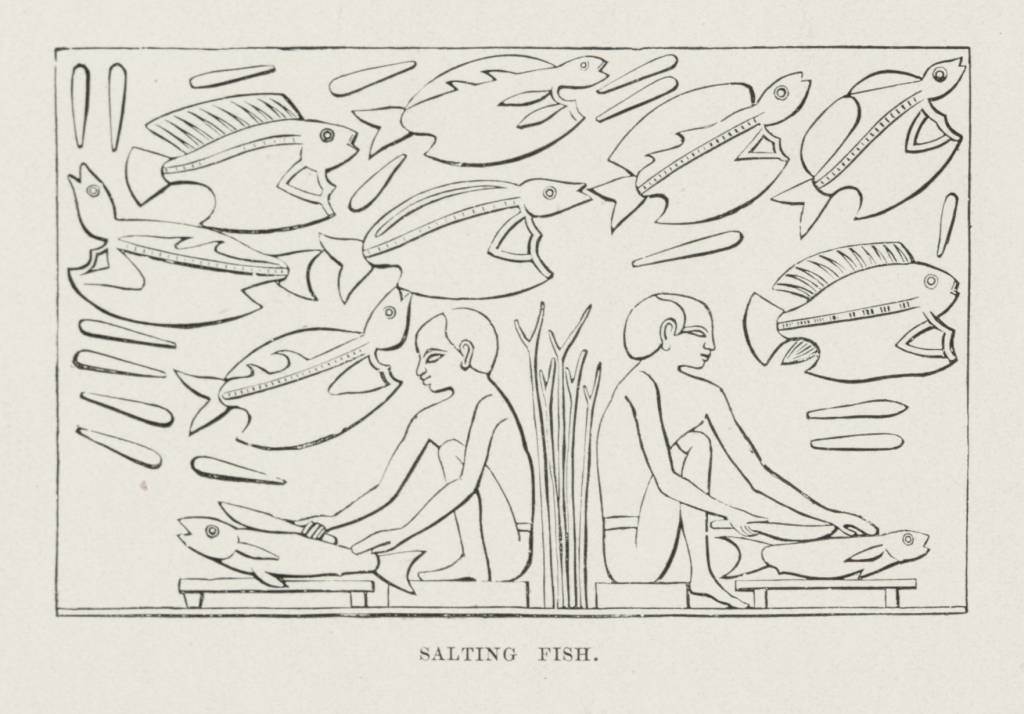
Two men filleting and salting fish, 1878

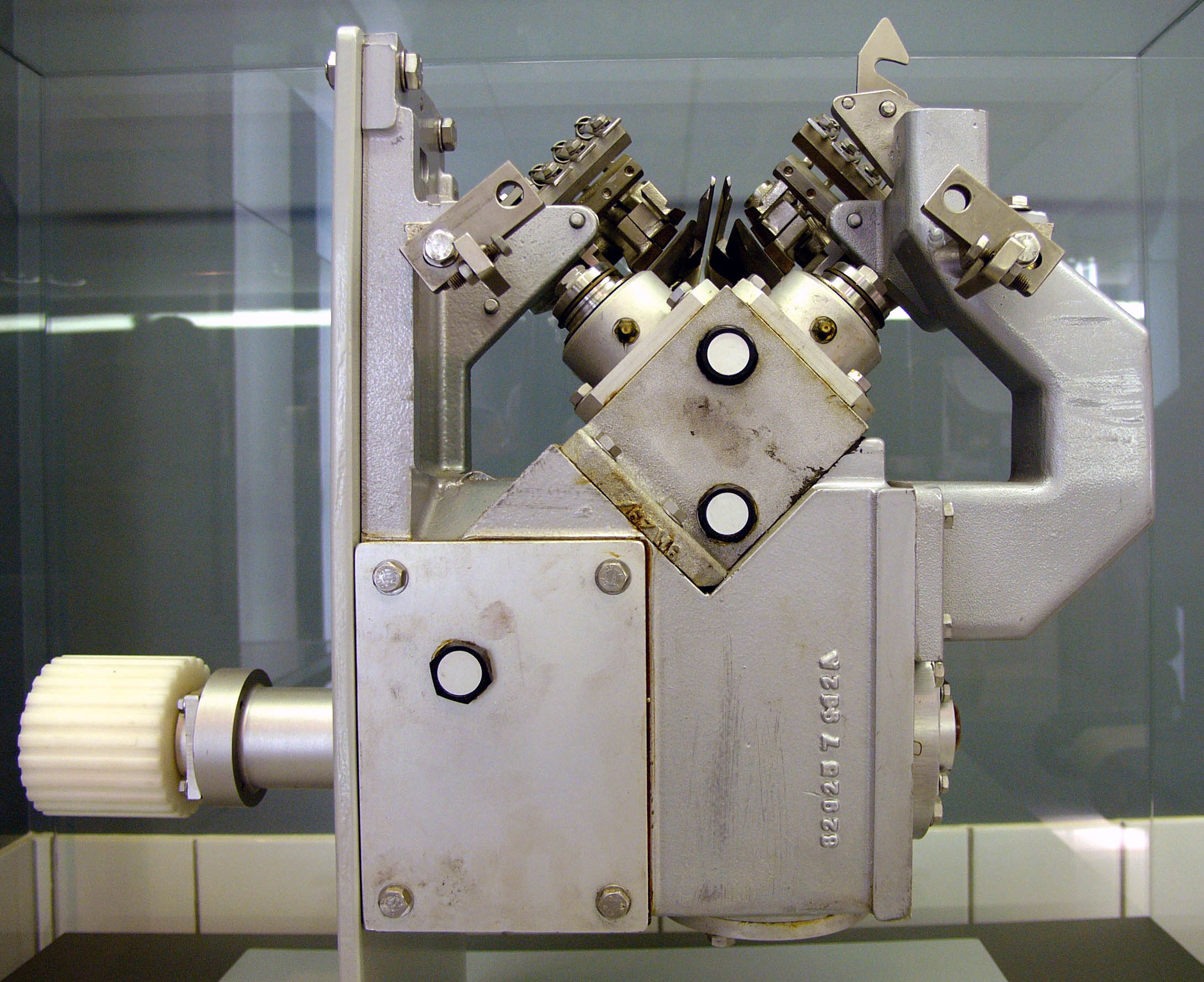
Automatic knives for filleting fish

== See also ==
- Fish fillet processor
