= Beurre maître d'hôtel =

Type of compound butter

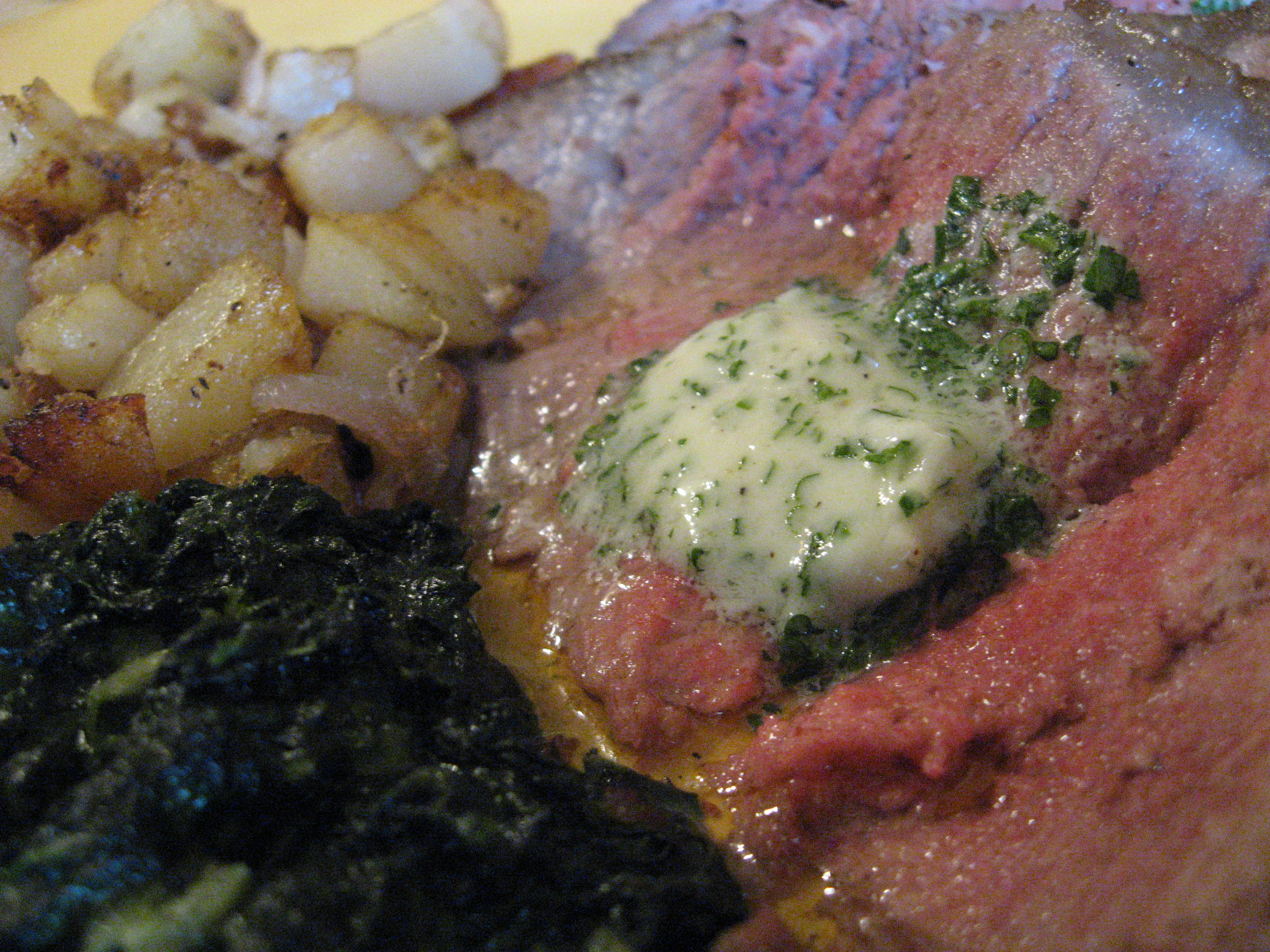
- Beurre maître d'hôtel atop a New York strip steak, served with diced potatoes and creamed spinach
- Type: Compound butter
- Place of origin: France
- Serving temperature: Cold or heated/melted
- Main ingredients: Butter, parsley, lemon juice, salt, pepper
- Variations: Sweet versions exist

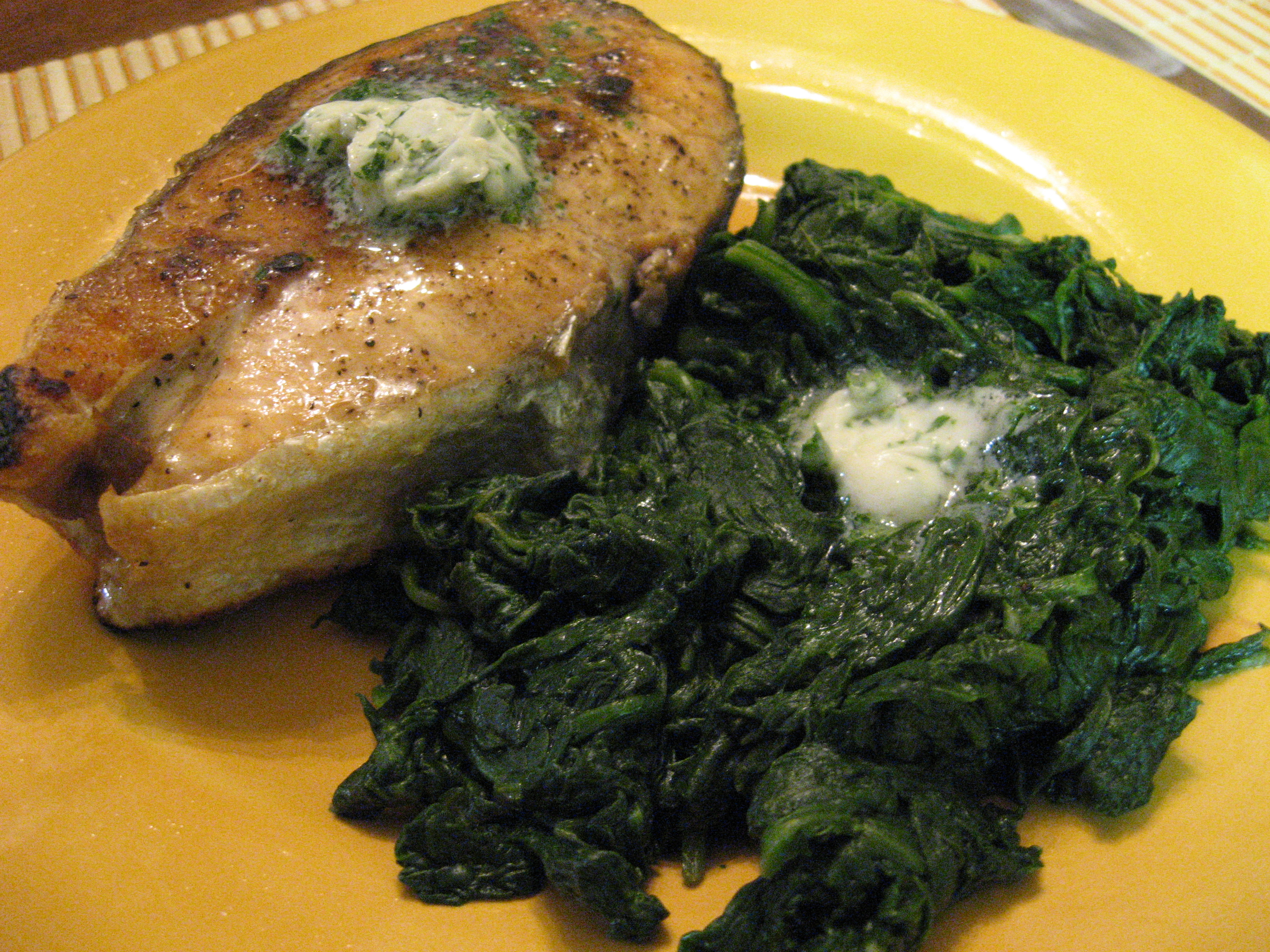
A salmon steak with beurre maître d'hôtel, served with spinach

Beurre maître d'hôtel (French pronunciation: [bœʁ mɛːtʁ dotɛl]), also referred to as maître d'hôtel butter or maître d' butter, is a type of compound butter (French: beurre composé) of French origin, prepared with butter, parsley, lemon juice, salt and pepper. It is a savory butter that is used on meats such as steak (including the sauce for Chateaubriand steak), fish, vegetables and other foods. It may be used in place of a sauce, and can significantly enhance a dish's flavor. Some variations with a sweet flavor exist. It is usually served cold as sliced disks on foods, and is sometimes served as a side condiment.

== Etymology ==
The name of beurre maître d'hôtel is derived from the manner in which it was commonly prepared from scratch by a restaurant's maître d'hôtel at diners' tables. (Note: "Most compound butters are savory. Perhaps the best known has the most daunting name, Beurre Maitre d’Hotel, so called because it was often made tableside by a restaurant’s maitre d’.") It is also referred to as maître d'hôtel butter.

== Preparation ==
Beurre maître d'hôtel is a savory butter prepared by mixing softened butter with very finely minced parsley, lemon juice, salt and black pepper. A ratio of around 1.5 tablespoons of parsley to two ounces of butter may be used. Additional ingredients may include shallot and Worcestershire sauce. Vinegar is sometimes used, although its inclusion is rare. Cayenne pepper has also been used. After mixing, it is typically rolled in parchment paper or plastic wrap and chilled to harden.

== Uses ==
Beurre maître d'hôtel is usually served cold as sliced disks atop various foods, and sometimes as a side condiment. It is used on grilled meats such as steak and fish, and also on eggs, vegetables, potatoes and breads. Some variations exist, including a few sweet versions that include sugar, which may be used on dishes such as pancakes. When used as a topping, it is typically added just before the dish is served. It has also been served melted atop dishes, whereby it is placed atop foods during the last few minutes of cooking. It may be used in the place of a sauce, and a small amount can significantly add to a dish's overall flavor.

=== In Chateaubriand sauce ===
Beurre maître d'hôtel is used as an ingredient in Chateaubriand sauce, which is sometimes used in the preparation of Chateaubriand steak. The butter is used in the last stage of the sauce's preparation, whereby after the sauce is strained, it is finished with beurre maître d'hôtel. Chopped tarragon may also be added to the sauce during this last preparation stage. (Note: "Strain through muslin, and finish the sauce away from the fire with four oz. of butter Maître d'Hôtel, to which may be added a little chopped tarragon.")

== See also ==
- French cuisine
- List of condiments
- Steak sauce
