= Garlic butter =

Compound butter

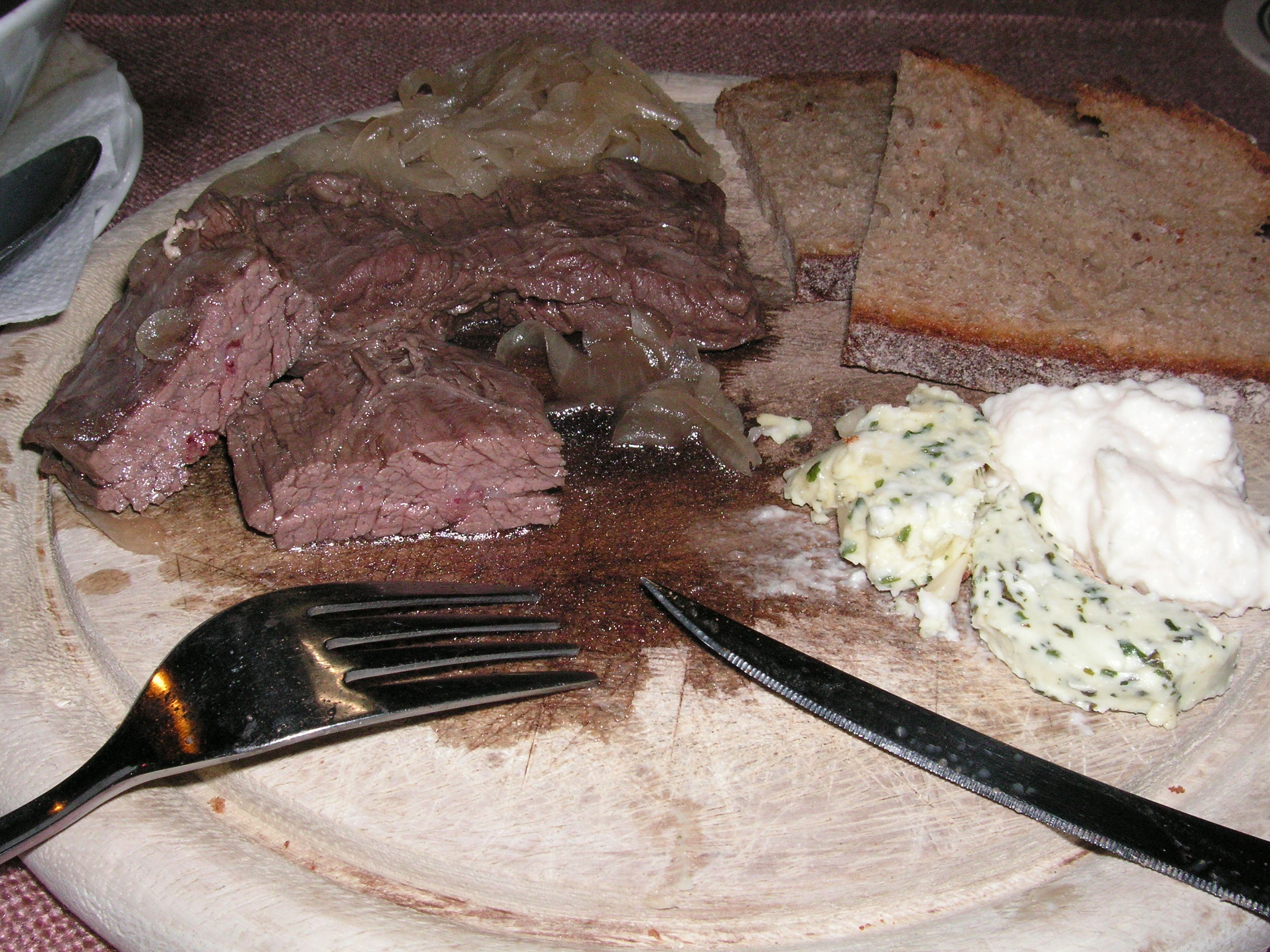
- Kronfleisch (skirt steak), a traditional Bavarian dish often served with onion rings, rye bread, compound butter (with herbs and garlic) and horseradish
- Alternative names: Beurre à la bourguignonne
- Type: Compound butter
- Main ingredients: Garlic, butter

Garlic butter, also known as beurre à la bourguignonne, is a compound butter used as a flavoring for many dishes or as a condiment. It is composed of butter and garlic mixed into a paste. The ingredients are blended and typically chilled before use.

== Dipping sauce ==
In the United States, garlic butter in small cups is sometimes served with seafood (such as lobster), pizza, or breadsticks as a dip. To prolong shelf life, the dip may use clarified butter or flavored oils.

== See also ==
- List of butter dishes
- List of condiments
