= Diplomat pudding =

Molded pudding dessert

- Alternative names: Diplomate au Bavarois
- Type: Pudding
- Course: Dessert
- Place of origin: France
- Main ingredients: ladyfingers, Bavarian cream or egg custard

Diplomat pudding (French: Diplomate au Bavarois) is a cold dessert prepared in a mold. There are two methods of preparation. The more common method uses ladyfingers soaked in rum or Kirsch flavored syrup, layered with candied fruit, apricot jam, and an egg custard or Bavarian cream. This is then refrigerated, then later removed from the mold and coated with a fruit sauce or custard cream.

In the second method of preparation, the ladyfingers are replaced with stale brioche soaked in milk, and the entire pudding is cooked in a bain-marie before the refrigeration process.
