= Filet mignon =

Cut of beef

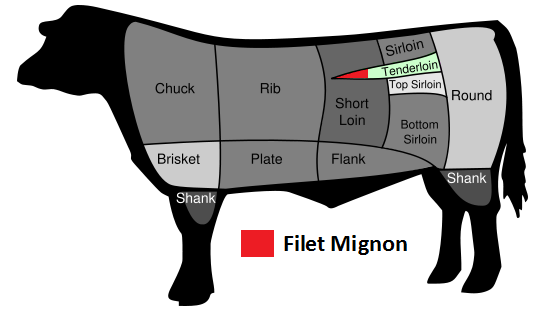
- Diagram of where filet mignon is butchered from
- Type: Tenderloin

Filet mignon (/ˌfiːleɪ ˈmiːnjɒ̃/; French: [filɛ miɲɔ̃]; lit. 'delicate, fine, or cute fillet') in North America, especially the United States refers solely to a cut of beef taken from the smaller end of a tenderloin, or psoas major of a cow. In France, filet mignon usually refers to cuts of pork tenderloin or veal tenderloin.

The tenderloin runs along both sides of the spine, and is usually butchered as two long snake-shaped cuts of meat. The tenderloin is sometimes sold whole. Filet mignon is usually presented as a round cut taken from the thinner end of a piece of tenderloin. It is often the most tender and lean cut. Filet mignon often has a milder flavour than other cuts of meat and as such is often garnished with a sauce or wrapped with bacon.

Due to the small amount of filet mignon able to be butchered from each animal, it is generally considered one of the most expensive cuts of beef.

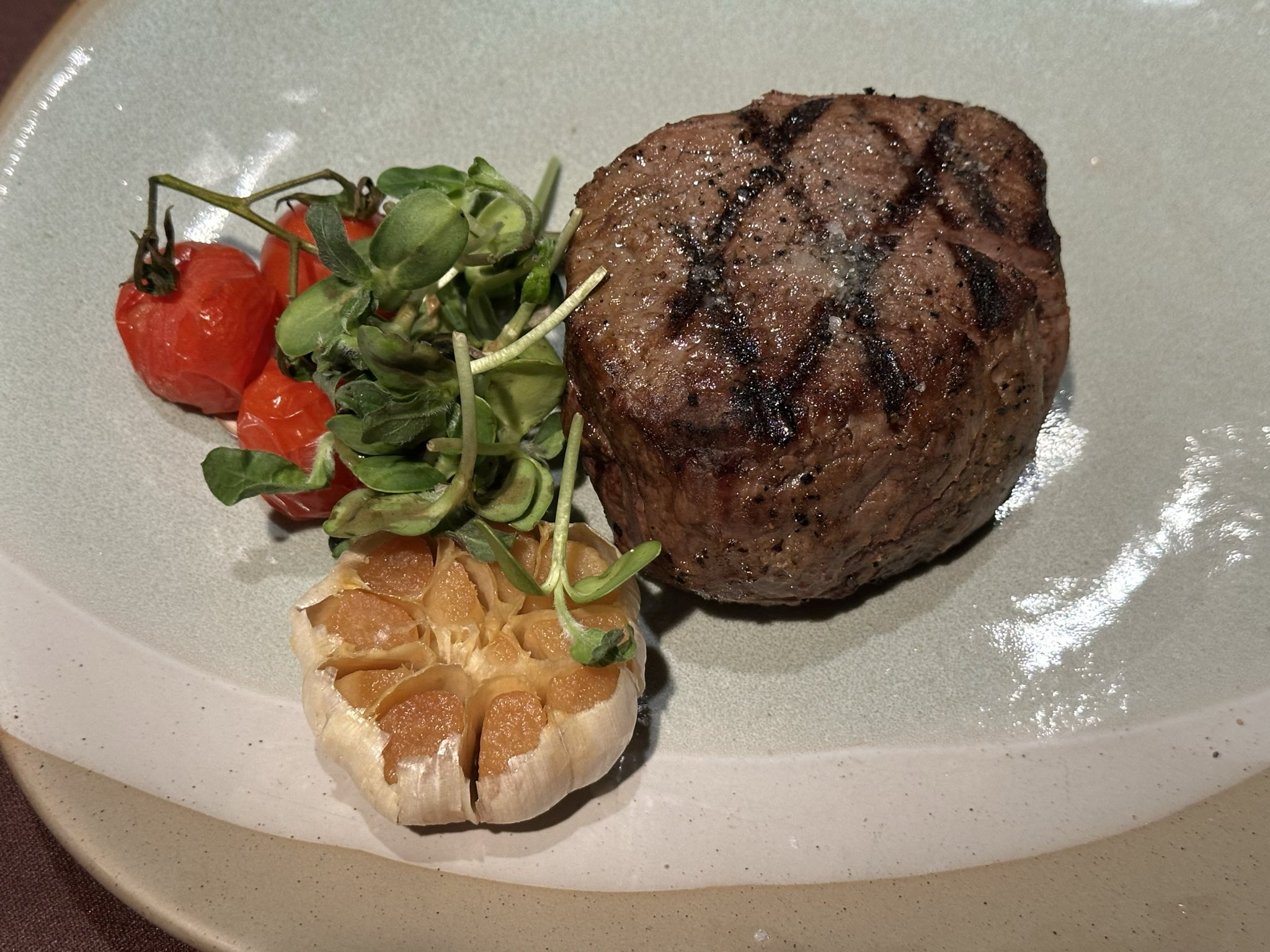
A medium-rare filet mignon served at a steakhouse

== Usage ==
=== Europe ===
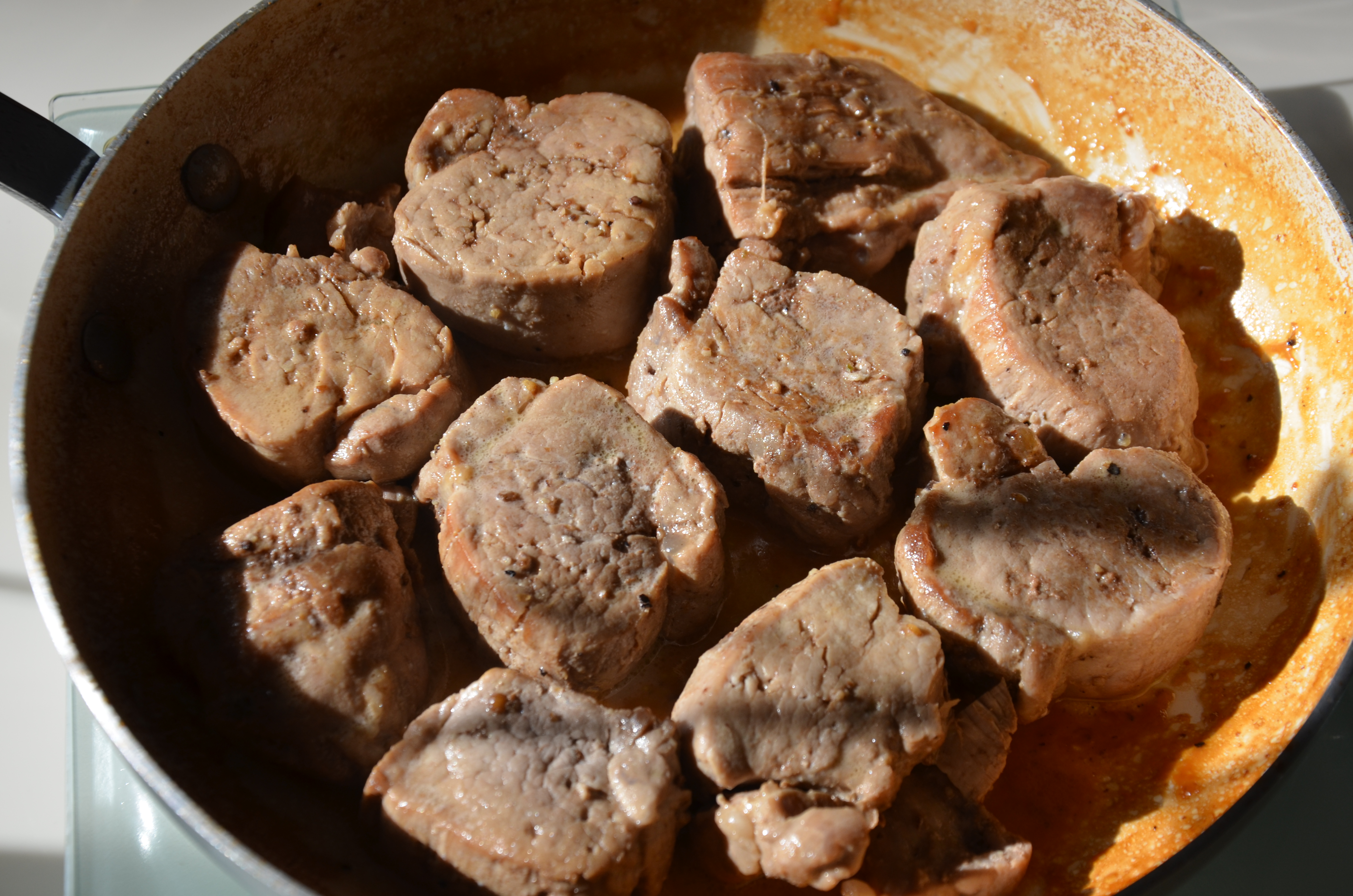
Filet mignon (pork) cooking in a pan

In France, the term filet mignon refers to pork. The cut of beef referred to as filet mignon in the United States has various names across the rest of Europe; e.g., filet de bœuf in French and filet pur in Belgium, filetto in Italy, fillet steak in the UK, Filetsteak in German, solomillo in Spanish (filet in Catalan), lombo in Portuguese, filee steik in Estonian, and filetbiff in Norwegian.

In the UK, pork fillet or pork medallion is the term used to describe a similar cut of pork.

=== North America ===
Filet mignon refers to cuts from a beef tenderloin in North America.

In the U.S., both the central and large end of the tenderloin are often sold as filet mignon in supermarkets and restaurants. The French terms for these cuts are tournedos (the smaller central portion), châteaubriand (the larger central portion), and biftek (cut from the large end known as the tête de filet (lit. 'head of filet') in French).

Porterhouse steaks and T-bone steaks are large cuts that include the filet. The small medallion on one side of the bone is the filet, and the long strip of meat on the other side of the bone is the strip steak.

== Gallery ==
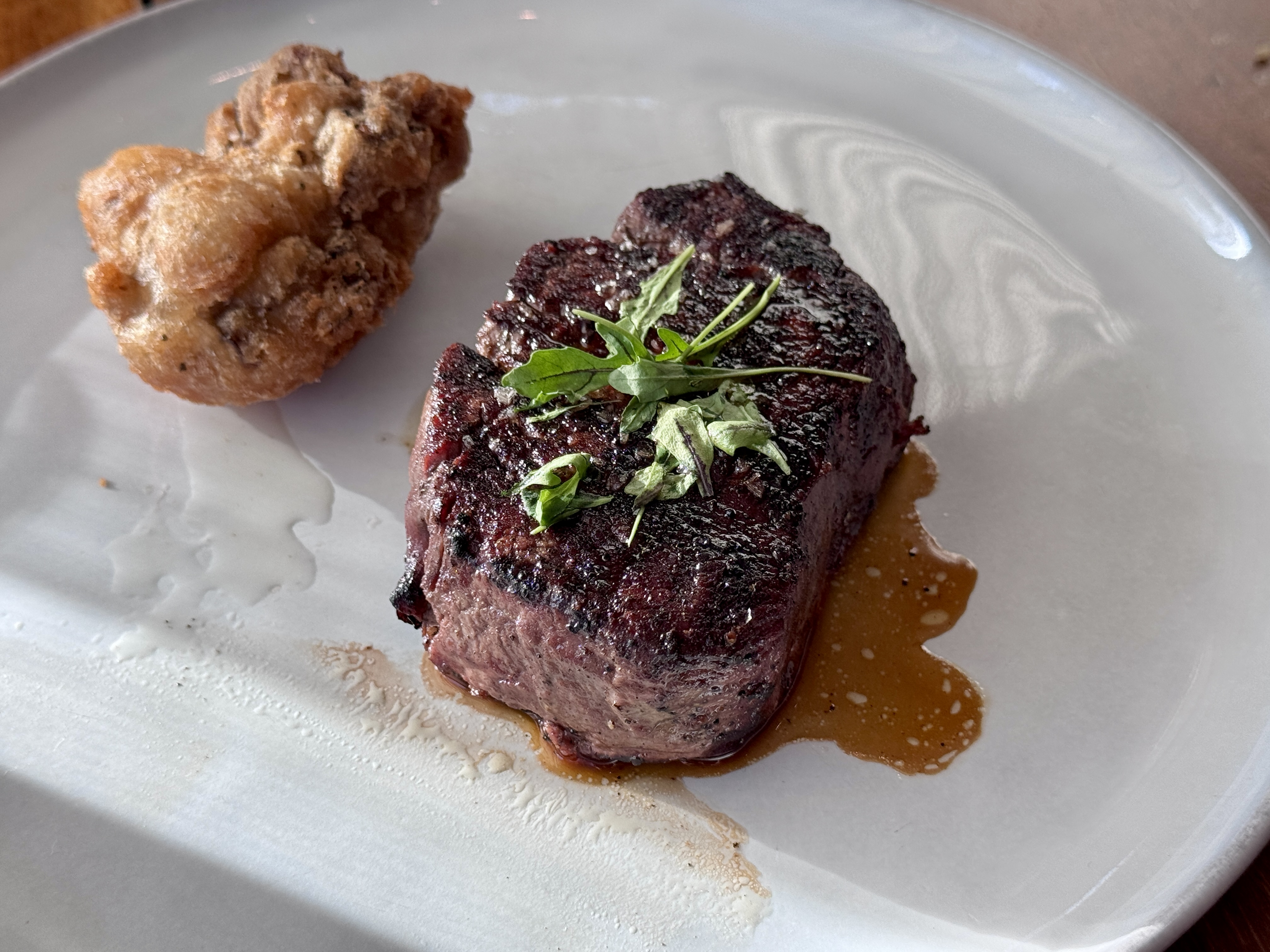
A medium rare filet mignon in California

== See also ==
- Pork tenderloin
- Beef tenderloin

== Sources ==
- Beck, Simone; Louisette Bertholle; Julia Child (2012) [1961]. Mastering the Art of French Cooking, Volume One. London: Particular. ISBN 978-0-241-95339-6.
