= Kranz =

Kranz may refer to:

- Kranz (surname)
- Kranz Maduke, fictional character in Black Cat comic series

== See also ==
- Frankfurter Kranz, cake
- Krantz, a surname
- Cranz (disambiguation)
- Crantz (1722–1799), European botanist & physician Heinrich Johann Nepomuk von Crantz
