= Tameletjie =

Homemade toffee confection

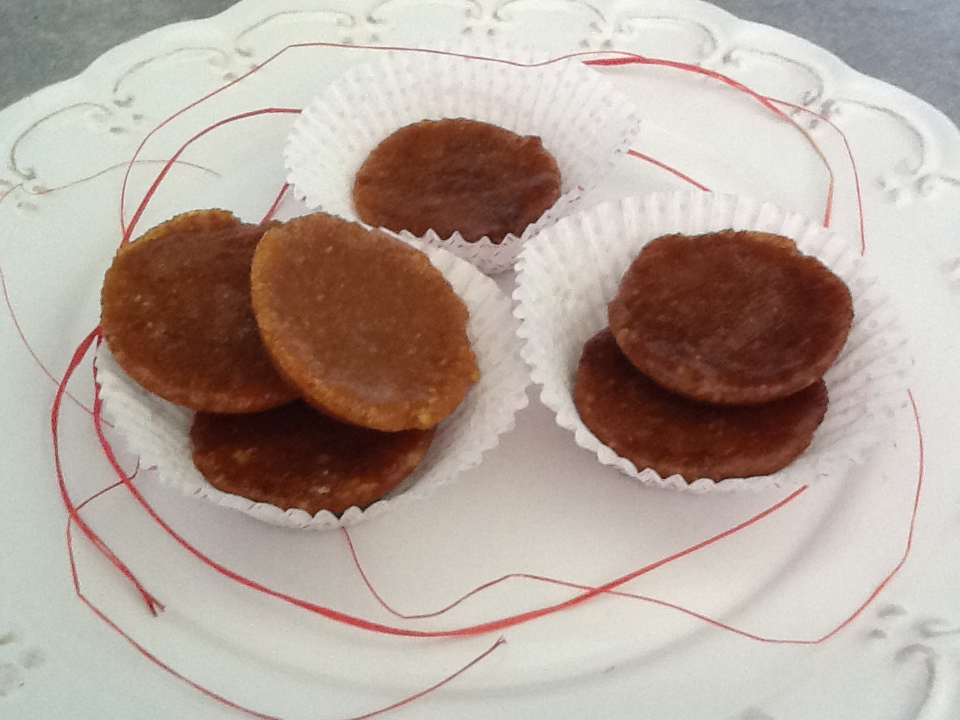
Tameletjie

A tameletjie is a homemade toffee confection which features prominently within the Afrikaner and Malay cultures of South Africa. The sweet is made from sugar and water which has been boiled until caramelized and then rested to cool to form a hard sweet. There are many variations to the sweet attained by adding almonds, pine nuts or coconut to the recipe.

== Origin ==
The tameletjie is one of the oldest confections in South Africa. It originated as a result of importing sugar cane from China and the East and West Indian islands. The Malay settlers in the Cape were the first to popularise and add different ingredients to the recipe such as pine nuts, which were readily available due to the vast vegetation of pine trees in the Cape. Although sugar was a relatively expensive commodity, the tameletjie was the only 'sweet' settlers had, or could make so it became common. The Malays were known for selling food in the streets of Cape Town, and so the tameletjie become a popular treat among Europeans and other settlers.

As the sweet became more popular it was adopted in different cultures which resulted in variations of the tameletjie. It is popular in different cultures and has a history unlike the sweets found in stores today.

== Metaphorical use of the term ==
"Tameletjie" is a widely used word in Afrikaans-language South African media publications and academic articles. The word is mostly used within the body of the articles but is also common within titles. It is also widely used within publications on varying subjects ranging from economic, agriculture and environmental affairs, legal and political affairs, to education, language and religious matters to describe a sticky/tough situation.

== Ingredients ==
The sweet is made of sugar, water, and pine nuts or almonds. Pine nuts were originally used, although almonds are a popular alternative.

== See also ==
- Almond Roca
- Chikki
- Frankfurter Kranz
- Gozinaki
- Ka'í Ladrillo
- Nougat
- Toffee
