= Kranitz =

Kranitz is a surname. Notable people with the surname include:

- László Kránitz (born 1973), Hungarian politician
- Rick Kranitz (born 1958), American baseball coach
- Simon Kranitz (born 1996), German footballer

== See also ==
- Krantz
