= Brittle (food) =

Confection made with nuts

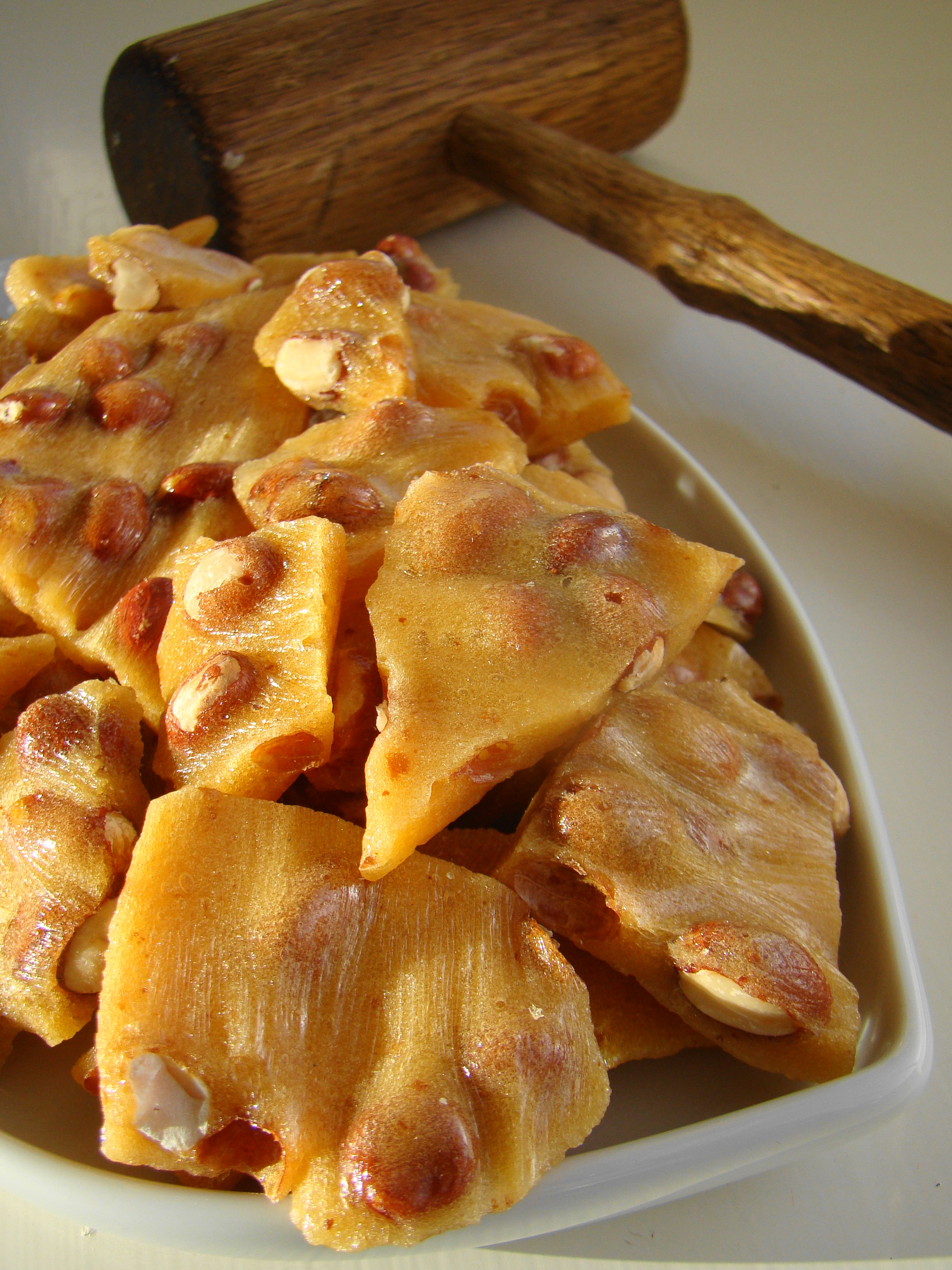
- Golden peanut brittle cracked on a serving dish
- Type: Confectionery
- Main ingredients: Sugar, nuts, water, butter

Brittle is a type of confection consisting of flat broken pieces of hard sugar candy embedded with nuts such as pecans, almonds, or peanuts, and which are usually less than 1 cm (0.4 in) thick.

== Types ==
It has many variations around the world, such as:

- pasteli in Greece
- sohan in Iran
- croquant or nougatine in France
- croccante in Italy
- krokan in Norway and Turkey
- krokant in Croatia and Germany
- torrão in Portugal
- alegría or palanqueta in Mexico
- pé-de-moleque in Brazil
- panocha mani, panutsa mani, or samani in the Philippines (which can also be made with pili nut)
- gozinaki in Georgia
- gachak in Indian Punjab, chikki in other parts of India
- kotkoti in Bangladesh
- gajak in Pakistan
- huasheng tang (花生糖) in China
- thua tat (ถั่วตัด) in Thailand
- kẹo lạc, kẹo hạt điều in Vietnam.
- praline in Louisiana, traditionally made with pecans.

In parts of the Middle East, brittle is made with pistachios, while many Asian countries use sesame seeds and peanuts. Peanut brittle is the most popular brittle recipe in the United States. The term "brittle" in the context of the food first appeared in print in 1892, though the candy itself has been around for much longer.

== Preparation of American peanut brittle ==
Traditionally, a mixture of sugar and water is heated to the hard crack stage, reaching approximately 146 to 154 °C (295 to 309 °F). Some recipes may call for ingredients such as glucose and salt in this step. Next, nuts are mixed with the caramelized sugar. At this point spices, leavening agents, and often peanut butter or butter are added. The hot candy is then poured onto a flat surface to cool, typically a granite slab, a marble slab, or a baking sheet. The hot candy may be troweled to uniform thickness. When the brittle is cool enough to handle, it is broken into pieces. It is also rare to break the brittle into equal pieces.

== Nougatine ==
Nougatine is a similar confection to brittle, but made of sliced almonds instead of whole peanuts, which are embedded in clear caramel.

== See also ==
- Almond Roca
- Caramel
- Churchkhela
- Florentine biscuit
- Frankfurter Kranz
- Dalgona
- Ka'í Ladrillo
- List of peanut dishes
- Nougat
- Praliné
- Rempeyek
- Toffee
- Turrón (in Spain)
