= Branz =

Branz is a surname. Notable people with the surname include:

- María Sol Branz (born 1990), Argentine sailor
- Hermann Branz (1920–2004), German philatelist

== See also ==
- Kranz (surname)
