= Chikki =

Peanut-based confection

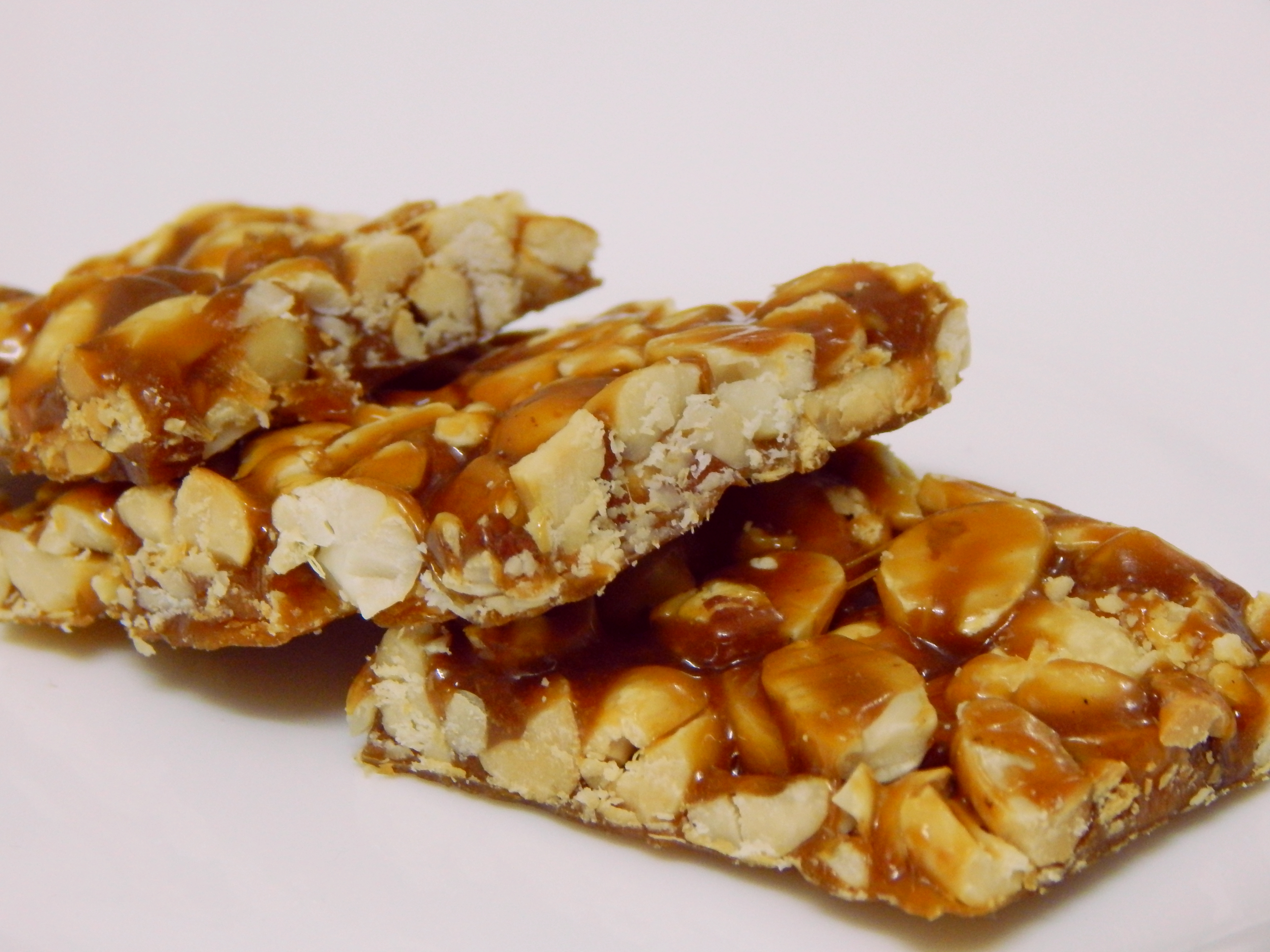
- Peanut chikki
- Alternative names: Kadalai (Kadale) Mittai,(Git) Gud Badam, Palli Patti, Kappalandi Muthai, Thua Tat, Amrutam, Chikii
- Type: Brittle
- Course: Snack
- Place of origin: India
- Region or state: India, Pakistan, Bangladesh
- Main ingredients: Peanuts, jaggery

Chikki is a traditional Indian sweet (brittle) generally made from nuts and jaggery/sugar. There are several different varieties of chikki in addition to the most common groundnut (peanut) chikki. Each variety of chikki is named after the ingredients used, which include puffed or roasted Bengal gram, sesame, puffed rice, beaten rice, or khobra (desiccated coconut), and other nuts such as almonds, cashews and pistachios.

== Names ==
In Sindh province of Pakistan, it is called layee or lai. In north Indian states, it is also known as gajak or maroonda. In Bangladesh, West Bengal and other Bengali-speaking regions, it is known as gur badam. In Maharashtra it is called as Chikki. In Kashmir it's known as Patti.In the South Indian states of Telangana and Andhra Pradesh, it is called palli patti (పల్లీ పట్టీ). In Kerala it is called kappalandi mittayi; in Tamil Nadu, kadalai mittai; in Karnataka kadale Mittai. Similar dishes are also very popular in Brazil, where it is known as pé de moleque, in Paraguay, where it is called ka'i ladrillo, and in Thailand, where it is called thua tat.

== Ingredients ==
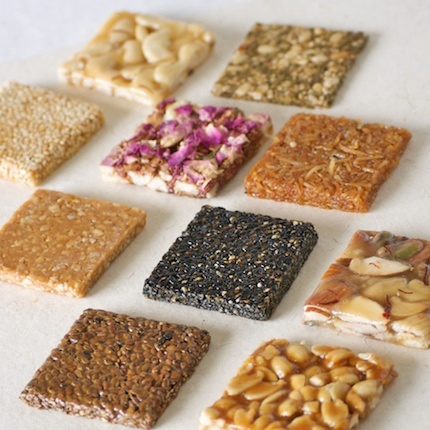
Assorted chikkis

Chikkis are made using a combination of ingredients. Special chikkis are made out of cashews, almonds, pistachios, and also sesame seed. Though jaggery is the usual sweetener material, sugar is sometimes used as the base. It is a very popular sweet item in both rural and urban South Asia. In the South Indian state of Tamil Nadu, preparation often takes place with a larger proportion of nuts to jaggery. In several states, chikkis in both square and round forms are available.

== Preparation ==
The preparation of chikkis consists of first preparing the hot jaggery syrup with a minimum of water, adding nuts to the syrup to coat them (with the syrup) and then transferring the nuts to a wooden mould, then rolling them to a thickness of about 6–8 mm using a wooden roller, then placing into a steel plate for cooling, cutting into slabs, and packing. In homes, smaller quantities are hand rolled with wooden rollers.

Most popular chikkis are sourced from the Indian towns of Bhuj in Gujarat; Kovilpatti and Madurai in Tamil Nadu; Palakkad, Central Travancore, Kannur, Cherthala in Kerala, Lonavala, Matheran, Mahabaleshwar, Panchgani, and Karjat in Maharashtra. In Mumbai, a variety of chikki is made using rajgira (amaranth).

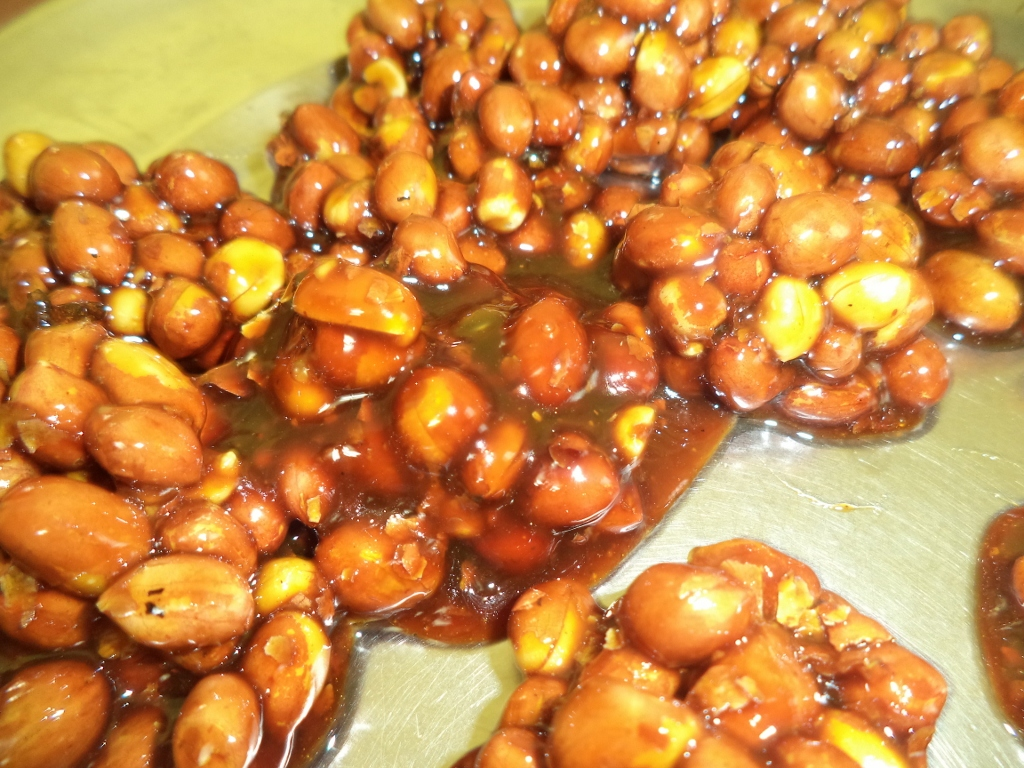
Homemade Chikki from Tamil Nadu

== See also ==
- Tilsakri (Tilpatti/Tilpapdi), a similar candy with sesame seeds
- Kovilpatti
- Lonavala chikki
- Peanut brittle, a similar candy with a lower proportion of nuts
- Gozinaki
- Yeot-gangjeong
- List of peanut dishes
- Tameletjie
- Alegría (Mexican candy)
- Pé-de-moleque
