= Krentz =

Krentz is a surname. Notable people with the surname include:

- Dale Krentz (born 1961), professional ice hockey player, played 30 games in the National Hockey League
- Jayne Ann Krentz, née Jayne Castle, American writer of romance novels
- Matthew Scott Krentz, also known as Matt Krentz, (born 1976), American director, producer and actor
- Robert Krentz (1951–2010), prominent rancher in the U.S. state of Arizona
- Torsten Krentz (born 1966), East German sprint canoeist, competed in the late 1980s and early 1990s

== See also ==
- Karenz
- Krantz
