= Smorgasbord =

Buffet-style meal of Swedish origin

Smörgåsbord
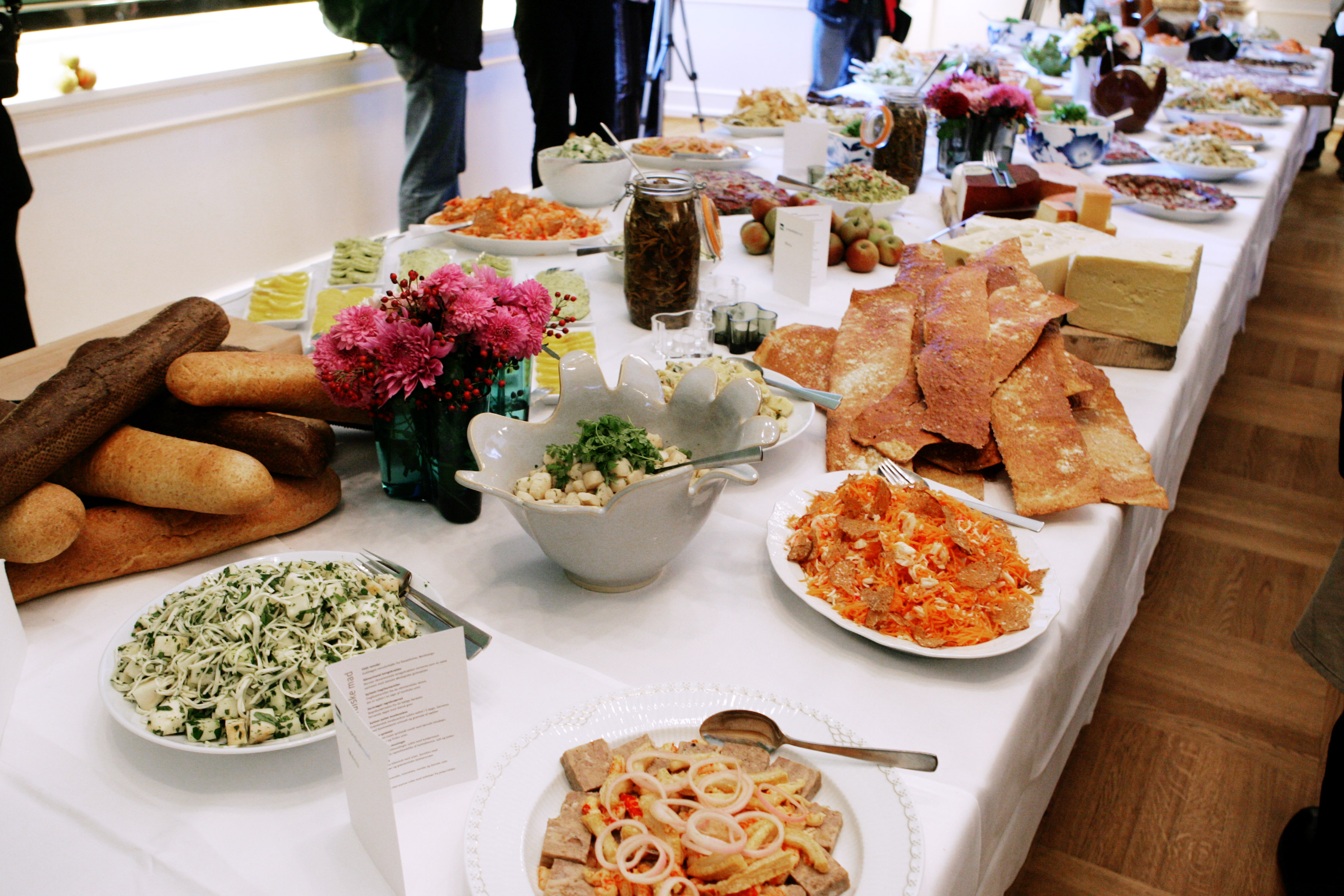
- A New Nordic Cuisine smörgåsbord
- Type: Lunch meal
- Place of origin: Sweden
- Serving temperature: Hot and cold
- Main ingredients: Bread, butter, and cheese

Smorgasbord or smörgåsbord (Swedish: [ˈsmœ̂rɡɔsˌbuːɖ], lit. 'sandwich-table' or 'buttered-bread table') is a buffet-style meal of Swedish origin. It is served with various hot and mainly cold dishes. It assumed its present form in the 19th century, following old traditions.

Smörgåsbord became known in the US at the 1939 New York World's Fair when it was offered at the Swedish Pavilion's Three Crowns Restaurant. It is typically a celebratory meal, and guests can help themselves from a range of dishes laid out for their choice. In a restaurant the term refers to a buffet-style table laid out with many small dishes from which, for a fixed amount of money, one is allowed to choose as many as one wishes.

A traditional Swedish smörgåsbord consists of both hot and cold dishes. Bread, butter, and cheese are always part of the smörgåsbord. It is customary to begin with cold fish dishes, which are generally various forms of herring, salmon, and eel. After eating the first portion, people usually continue with the second course (other cold dishes), and round off with hot dishes. Dessert may or may not be included in a smörgåsbord.

== Etymology ==
In Northern Europe, the term varies between "cold table" and "buffet": In Norway it is called koldtbord or kaldtbord, in Denmark det kolde bord (literally "the cold table"), in the Faroe Islands, kalt borð (cold table); in Germany kaltes Buffet and in the Netherlands and Flanders koud buffet (literally "cold buffet"); in Iceland it is called hlaðborð ("loaded/covered table"), in Estonia it is called Rootsi laud ("Swedish table") or puhvetlaud ("buffet table"), in Latvia aukstais galds ("the cold table"), in Lithuania švediškas stalas ("Swedish table"), in Finland voileipäpöytä ("butter-bread/sandwich table") or ruotsalainen seisova pöytä ("Swedish standing table/buffet"). In Belarus, Russia, Ukraine and the Balkans, it is a called "shvedskyj stol", "shvedskyi stil", or "shvedska masa" ("Swedish table") (Cyrillic: шведский стол / шведський стiл / шведска маса) or "zakusochnyj stol" ("snack table") (Cyrillic: закусочный стол) or "kholodnyj stol"("cold table") (Cyrillic: холодный стол). In Central and Eastern Europe each language has a term meaning "Swedish table". In Japan it is referred to as バイキング / ヴァイキング (baikingu / vaikingu, i.e. "Viking").

The Swedish word smörgåsbord consists of the words smörgås ("sandwich", usually open-faced) and bord ("table"). Smörgås in turn consists of the words smör ("butter", cognate with English smear) and gås (literally "goose", but later referred to the small pieces of butter that formed and floated to the surface of cream while it was churned). The small butter pieces were just the right size to be placed and flattened out on bread, so smörgås came to mean "buttered bread". In Sweden, the term att bre(da) smörgåsar ("to spread butter on open-faced sandwiches") has been used since at least the 16th century.

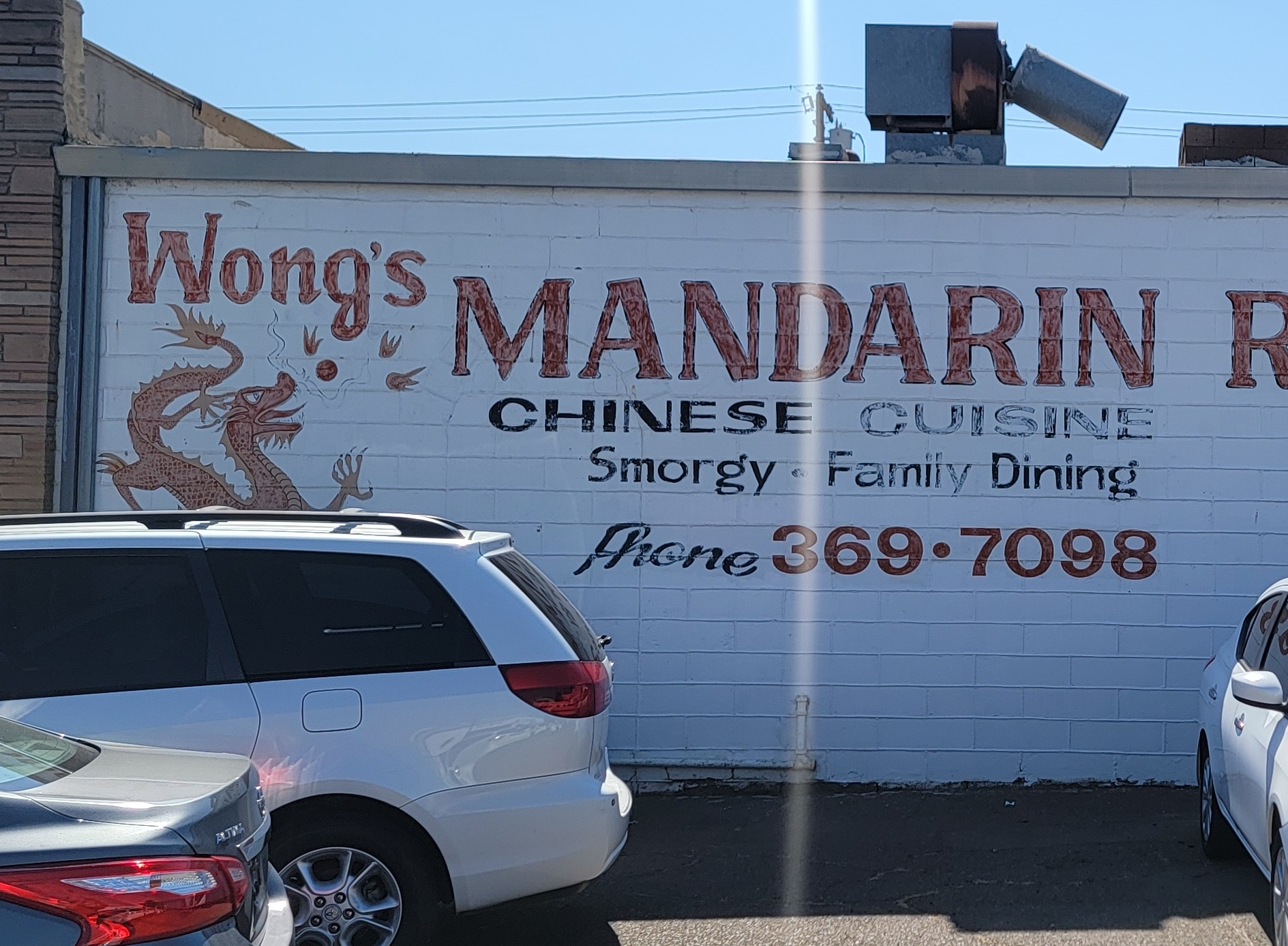
Between the 1950s and 70s, some restaurants in the USA advertised "smorgy" (later replaced by "buffet")

In English the word smorgasbord refers loosely to any buffet with a variety of dishes (as well as a metaphor for a variety or collection of anything, particularly an extensive or disorganized one), and is not necessarily used to refer to traditional Swedish cuisine. In Sweden, smörgåsbord instead refers to a buffet consisting mainly of traditional dishes. The buffet concept remains popular in Sweden even outside of its traditional presentation. Buffets are for example commonly served at larger private gatherings consisting of any type of food, or at fika with a variety of pastries. For restaurants in Sweden of various types of Asian cuisine it is common to offer an all-you-can-eat buffet (in particular for lunch customers), which is referred to with the more generic term buffé ("buffet").

In an extended sense, the word is used to refer to any situation which invites patrons to select whatever they wish from an abundant selection, such as the smorgasbord of university courses, books in a bookstore, etc.

== Julbord ==
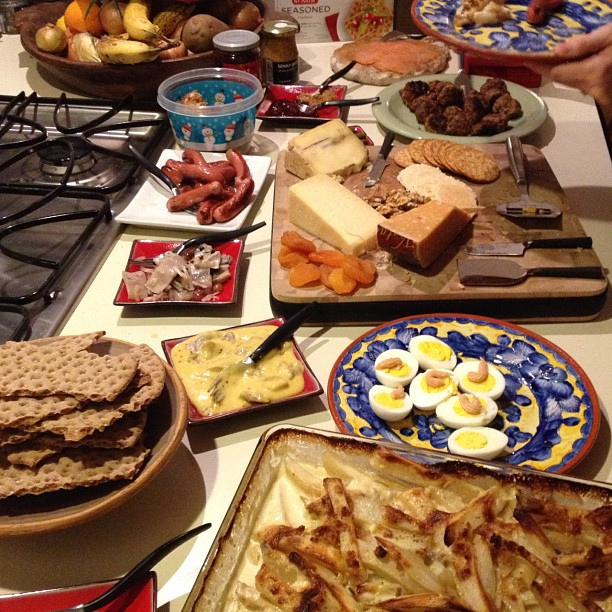
Smörgåsbord foods

A special Swedish type of smörgåsbord is the julbord (literally "Yule/Christmas table"). The classic Swedish julbord is central to traditional Swedish cuisine.

A traditional julbord is typically eaten buffet-style in five to seven courses (depending on local and family traditions). The first three courses are usually fish courses. The first plate is an assortment of different pickled herrings served with sour cream and chives. The second is a variety of cold fish, particularly several kinds of lox (e.g. gravlax); the third plate is hot fish dishes, particularly lutfisk. Other traditional dishes are (smoked) eel, rollmops, herring salad, baked herring, smoked salmon, smoked char and shellfish canapés, accompanied by sauces and dips.

The fourth course is often a selection of cold sliced meats, the most important cold cut being Christmas ham (julskinka) with mustard. Other traditional cuts include smoked sausages, leverpastej, wild game cuts, smoked leg of lamb (fårfiol), pâtés and several types of brawn (sylta). It is also common to serve the cold meats with sliced cheese, pickled cucumbers and soft (vörtbröd) and crispbreads.

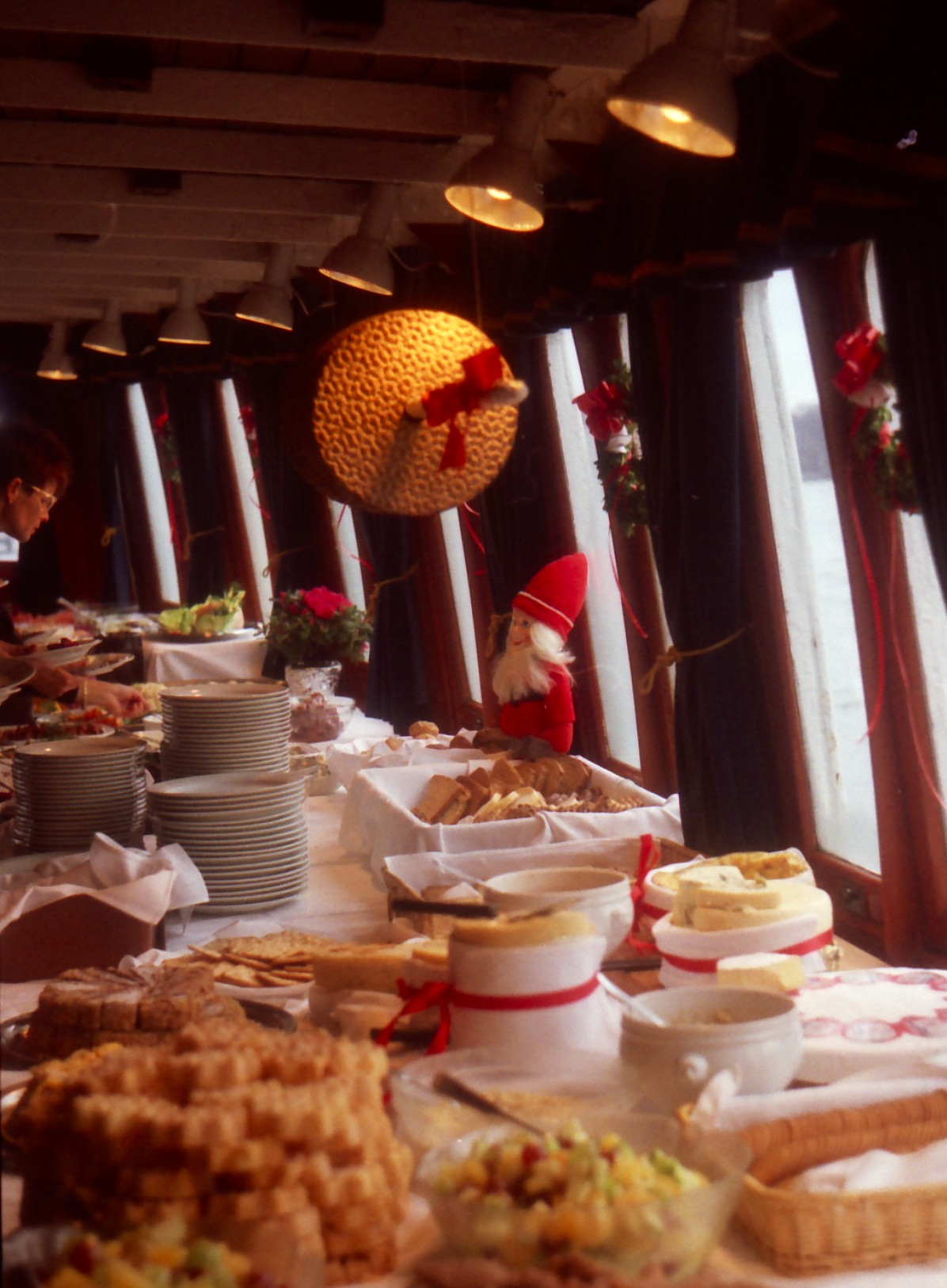
Julbord aboard the cruise boat Gustavsberg VII in 1990

The fifth course consists of warm dishes (småvarmt). Traditionally, the fifth course begins with soaking bread in the stock from the Christmas ham, which is called dopp i grytan. Warm dishes include Swedish meatballs (köttbullar), small fried hot-dog-type sausages (prinskorv), roasted pork ribs (revbensspjäll), pork sausages (fläskkorv), potato sausages (potatiskorv), and Janssons frestelse (literally "Jansson's Temptation"; a warm potato casserole), matchstick potatoes layered with cream, onion and sprats. Side dishes include beetroot salad in mayonnaise and warm stewed red, green or brown cabbage and boiled potatoes.

The sixth and seventh courses are a cheese plate and a dessert plate. Julbord cheeses include Stilton, Cheddar, västerbottenost and Christmas Edam cheese (edammer). Desserts include rosettes (struvor), klenäts (klenäter), polkagrisar, knäck, dates, figs, ischoklad, saffron buns, mandelmusslor, gingerbread cookies, marzipan figures, different kinds of nuts, risalamande, and, most importantly, rice pudding (risgrynsgröt) sprinkled with cinnamon powder. Traditionally, an almond is hidden in the bowl of rice pudding and whoever finds it receives a small prize or is recognised for having good luck.

A julbord often also include local and family specialties. Among them are isterband, baked beans, omelette with shrimps or mushrooms covered with béchamel sauce, äggost, saffranspannkaka, långkål, rörost, ostkaka, kroppkakor and julgädda.

Beer and the occasional snaps, brännvin or akvavit are common beverages served with this Christmas meal. The seasonal soft drink julmust is also served at the julbord, as well as during the whole Christmas holiday.

The Christmas ham is either boiled or broiled and then painted and glazed with a mixture of egg, breadcrumbs and mustard.

Lutfisk, lyed fish made of stockfish (dried ling or cod), is served with boiled potato, thick white sauce or mustard sauce, green peas and sometimes cubed bacon. More and more families opt to eat lutfisk as dinner the day before or after Christmas Eve rather than as a dish among other at the julbord.

Julbord is served from early December until just before Christmas at restaurants and until Epiphany in some homes. It is traditional for most Swedish and Norwegian workplaces to hold an annual julbord between November and January.

== History ==
The members of the Swedish merchant and upper class in sixteenth-century Sweden and Finland served a small buffet on a snaps table (brännvinsbord), offering a variety of hors d'oeuvres served prior to a meal before sitting at the dinner table. The most simple brännvinsbord was bread, butter, cheese, herring and several types of liqueurs; but smoked salmon, sausages and cold cuts were also served. The brännvinsbord was served as an appetizer for a gathering of people and eaten while standing before a dinner or supper, often two to five hours before dinner, sometimes with the men and women in separate rooms. The smörgåsbord became popular in the mid-seventeenth century, when the food moved from the side table to the main table and service began containing both warm and cold dishes. Smörgåsbord was also served as an appetizer in hotels and later at railway stations, before the dining cars time for the guests. During the 1912 Olympic Games, restaurants in Stockholm stopped serving smörgåsbord as an appetizer and started serving them instead as a main course.

== See also ==
- Swedish cuisine – Culinary traditions of Sweden
- Buffet – Meal system where diners serve themselves
- Korean table d'hôte – Korean buffet-style meal
- Zakuski – Russian term for appetizers served before meals
- Boodle fight – Filipino term for eating with hands
- Rijsttafel – Indonesian rice table buffet
- Pennsylvania Dutch cuisine
- Tapas / Pincho - Spanish variations of appetizers

== Sources ==
- Davidson, Alan; Jaine, Tom (20 November 2014). "smörgåsbord". The Oxford Companion to Food. Oxford University Press. ISBN 978-0-19-967733-7.
