= August Friedrich Cranz =

August Friedrich Cranz (born 26 September 1737 in Marwitz near Landsberg an der Warthe, died 19 October 1801 in Berlin) was a German writer.

His father was a Lutheran preacher. He may have been related to Albert Krantz. Cranz studied theology, then jurisprudence. In 1772, he became a private tutor to Count Solms in Berlin. On Solms' recommendation, he became a war and tax councilor in Cleve, but was forced to resign due to corruption. From 1779 to 1784, he lived and wrote in Berlin and Potsdam, where there was less censorship under Frederick the Great. He even received a royal pension for a time, however he overspent and fled to Hamburg to escape his creditors. Expelled from Hamburg in October 1785 after an attack on the Dutch prompted a complaint from the Dutch ambassador, he married a wealthy young woman and returned to Berlin in 1787. His marriage was dissolved through his fault, and he died destitute.

A prolific pamphleteer, he usually published anonymously. He participated in the Xenienkampf. He was very popular in his time, but today is almost unknown. Allgemeine Deutsche Biographie writes, "It seems as if he would have liked to become a German Voltaire, but he imitates his role model only in his vices. His frankness becomes impudent, his enlightenment frivolous, his wit cynical, his jests vulgar".

He wrote the lyrics to three songs (op 72b) by Friedrich Kuhlau.
