= Jacqueline Noel =

American librarian (1886 - 1964)

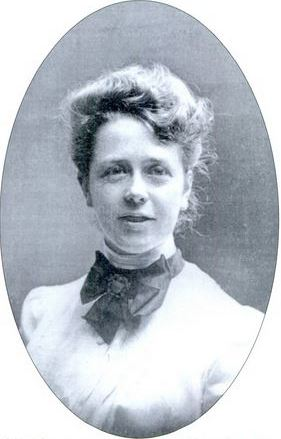
- Born: Jacqueline Noel; June 28, 1886; Washington, D.C.
- Died: 1964 (aged 77–78)
- Occupation: Tacoma City Librarian
- Known for: expand Washington State's public library system and coining the name for the popular candy, Almond Roca

Jacqueline Noel (June 28, 1886 – 1964) was an American librarian for the city of Tacoma, Washington. She was a leader in promoting the colonial history of the United States and helped to expand Washington State's public library system. Noel is also credited with coining the name for the popular candy, Almond Roca.

== Early life ==
Jacqueline Noel was born in Washington, D.C., on June 28, 1886, the daughter of Jacob Edmund Noel (died 1918), general secretary of the Scottish Rite bodies in the Tacoma jurisdiction, and Eleanor Freaneau Leadbeater. She had one sister, Anita Noel, who later married a Mr. Thomas W. Mason. The Noel family moved to Tacoma, WA in 1889 where Jacob Noel took up civil engineering.

In 1896 at the age of 10, Noel was elected secretary of the Mary Lampheer Society, Washington state's first chapter of Children of the American Revolution (C.A.R. for short). The C.A.R. had been proposed as a young people's division of the Daughters of the American Revolution at the C.A.R.'s Fourth Continental Congress in February 1895 and promptly chartered by the United States Congress. The Mary Lampheer Society first met on the one year anniversary of the C.A.R.'s formation at the Noel home in Tacoma with Jacqueline's mother, serving as president. As Washington was a new state at the time, its citizens had gathered little of historical interest to themselves, and the Society therefore devoted its attention to papers relating to the American Revolution and U.S. history with the purpose of celebrating the anniversaries of important events of revolutionary times.

Noel moved to New York City to attend the Pratt Institute, from which she graduated in 1913. She then returned to the Pacific Northwest to embark on her career. Miss Noel was an assistant librarian in La Grande and Portland, Oregon before joining the Tacoma Public Library staff in July 1924 as an assistant in the reference department.

== Career ==
Noel was an assistant librarian in La Grande, Oregon, and in Portland before joining the Tacoma Public Library staff in July 1914. She began in Tacoma as an assistant in the reference department, and In 1924 became city librarian. She served as chairperson to the Division of Literature at the Washington State Federation of Women's Clubs. She was also vice-president of the Pacific Northwest Library Association and a member of the American Library Association.

Noel was the driving force behind the creation of branch libraries in Tacoma. By the time of her retirement in 1947, new branches were beginning to open, and by the time of her death in 1964, many more were in operation. Jacqueline Noel obtained the funds to build the McCormick and Mottet branches by raising donations from citizens.

Noel was also a member of the Daughters of the American Revolution, The Huguenot Society of America, the Aloha Club, and the Business and Professional Woman's Club.

== Personal life ==
After living in New York City, Noel moved back to Washington in 1908 and lived with her family at 3020 North Alder Street, Tacoma, Washington.

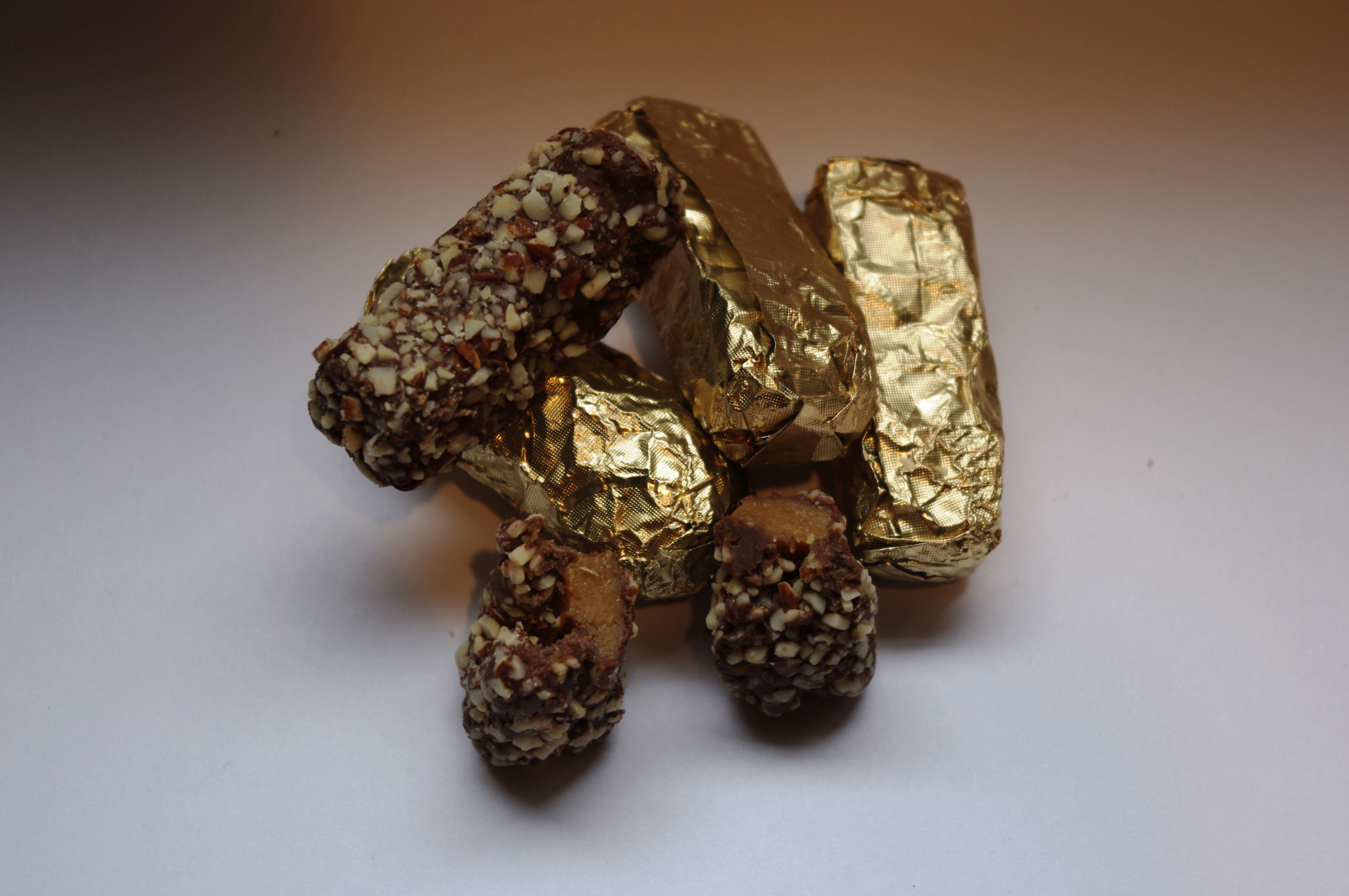
Almond Roca

In 1923 Tacoma confectioners Harry Brown and J.C. Haley crafted a chocolate-coated hard toffee covered in a crust of chopped almonds that made it less messy than its contemporaries. When Brown brought samples of his unnamed creation around to local residents, Noel suggested that he call it "Almond Roca," including the Spanish word "roca", meaning "rock" in English, to describe the hard, log-shaped confection. The United States Department of War later selected the candy as a product to distribute to U.S. Military facilities around the world, and tins of Almond Roca were shipped to American soldiers during World War II and in Korea. Brown & Haley went on to develop Cashew Roca, Macadamia Roca, Peppermint Roca, Mocha Roca, as well as dark chocolate and sugar-free varieties whose names can all be attributed to Noel's suggestion.

In the 1940s, Noel was living with Margaret Vildmo (b. 1918). Noel retired from her librarian work in 1947 and died in 1964.
