= Pé de moleque =

Traditional candy made of peanuts and cane sugar or molasses

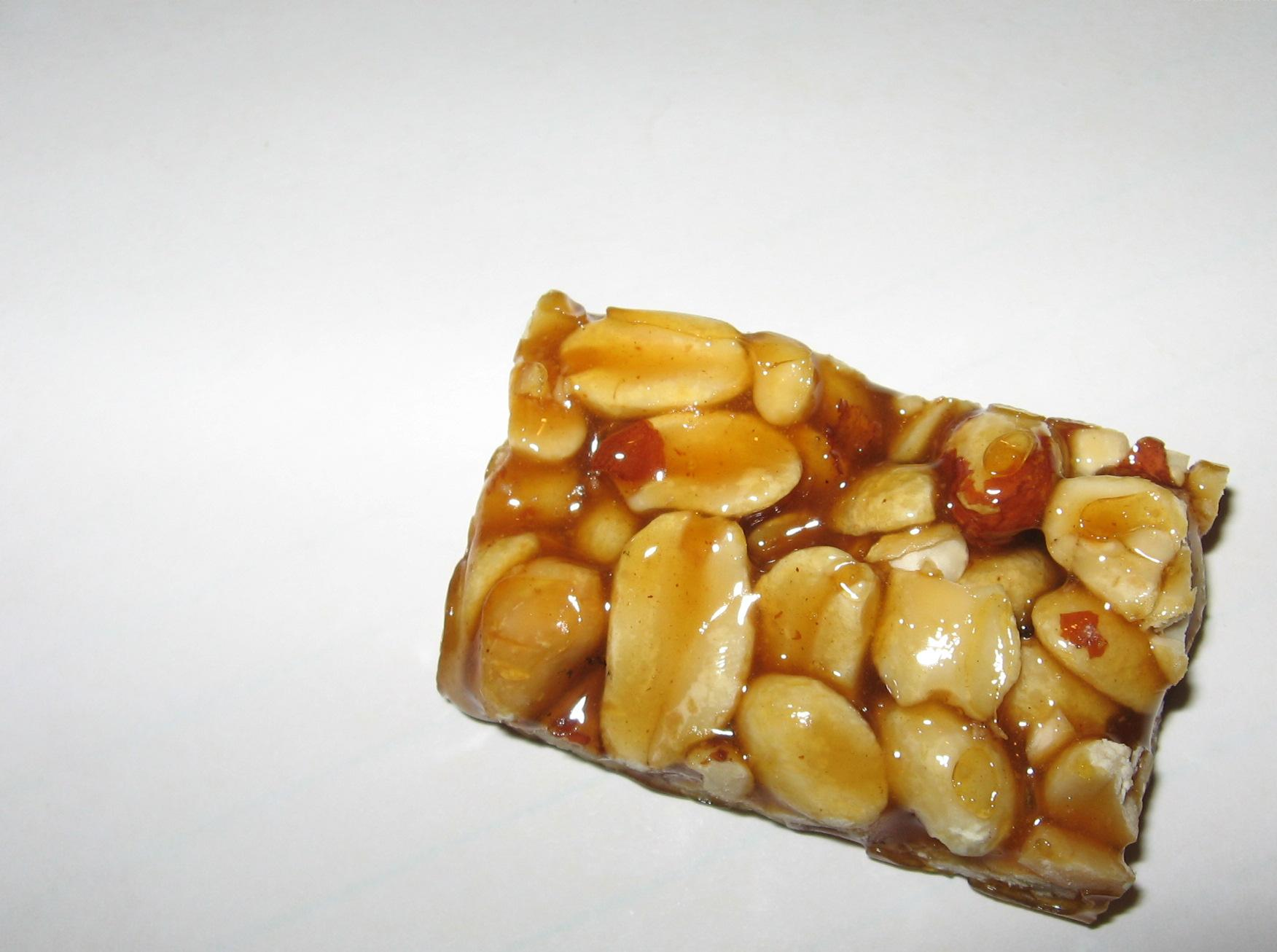
- Industrialized pé de moleque.
- Place of origin: São Paulo, Brazil
- Main ingredients: Peanut, rapadura

Pé de moleque (Portuguese: [ˈpɛ dʒi muˈlɛki], lit. 'Brat's foot') is a traditional candy from São Paulo cuisine, originating in the Captaincy of São Vicente, with the arrival of sugar cane in Brazil in the mid-16th century. It is made from a mixture of peanuts and rapadura or molasses and is associated with the tradition of caipira cuisine in the state of São Paulo, and is also widespread in Minas Gerais and Paraná. It is similar to peanut brittle.

The candy is prepared by mixing roasted, peeled peanuts with melted brown sugar, with or without the addition of macerated peanuts as well. The mixture is gently stirred over low heat until it gets close to crystallizing. Then the mixture is placed on a plain stone or metal surface (preferably thinly oiled with butter to ease removal) in pieces similar in size to cookies. This traditional preparation results in soft, irregularly-shaped sweets of a dark brown color. Softness results from the incorporation of peanut oil.

There is a derivation of the candy in the version of a cake, common to festa juninas from places in the Brazilian Northeast. Pé de moleque cake is also called Bolo preto (black cake), in which cashews can replace peanuts, rapadura is kept and puba (fermented cassava mass) and other ingredients.

== Etymology ==
The name pé de moleque has two hypotheses for its origin:

- reference to the paving of irregular stones found in historic Brazilian cities such as Paraty and Ouro Preto, which was so named.
- motivated by the street vendors of the past who sold them and were robbed by the kids. In order not to be harassed anymore, they told the boys to ask, because they didn't need to steal:

- Pede, moleque! (ask for it, kid!)

== History ==
One of the first references to this sweet in Brazil is found in the book Doceiro Nacional (National bakery cookbook). In this book you can find two recipes: pé de moleque prepared with sugar and prepared with rapadura.

Pé de moleque appeared in the mid-16th century, with the arrival of sugar cane in Brazil.

In 2008, the city of Piranguinho made the world's largest pé de moleque.

== See also ==
- Chikki - a similar Indian candy
- Ka'í Ladrillo - a similar Paraguayan candy
- List of Brazilian sweets and desserts
- Peanut brittle

== Notes ==
1. According to Vocabulário Ortográfico da Língua Portuguesa, released by Academia Brasileira de Letras in 2008, the spelling no longer has hyphens as it was until the 1990 Spelling Agreement came into force (pé-de-moleque). The hyphenated form was recorded for the first time in 1889, since this sweet was known in Brazil, previously, as "quebra-queixo" or "quebra-dentes" (Brazilian names that currently refer to British candy Gobstopper).
