= Prinskorv =

Swedish sausage

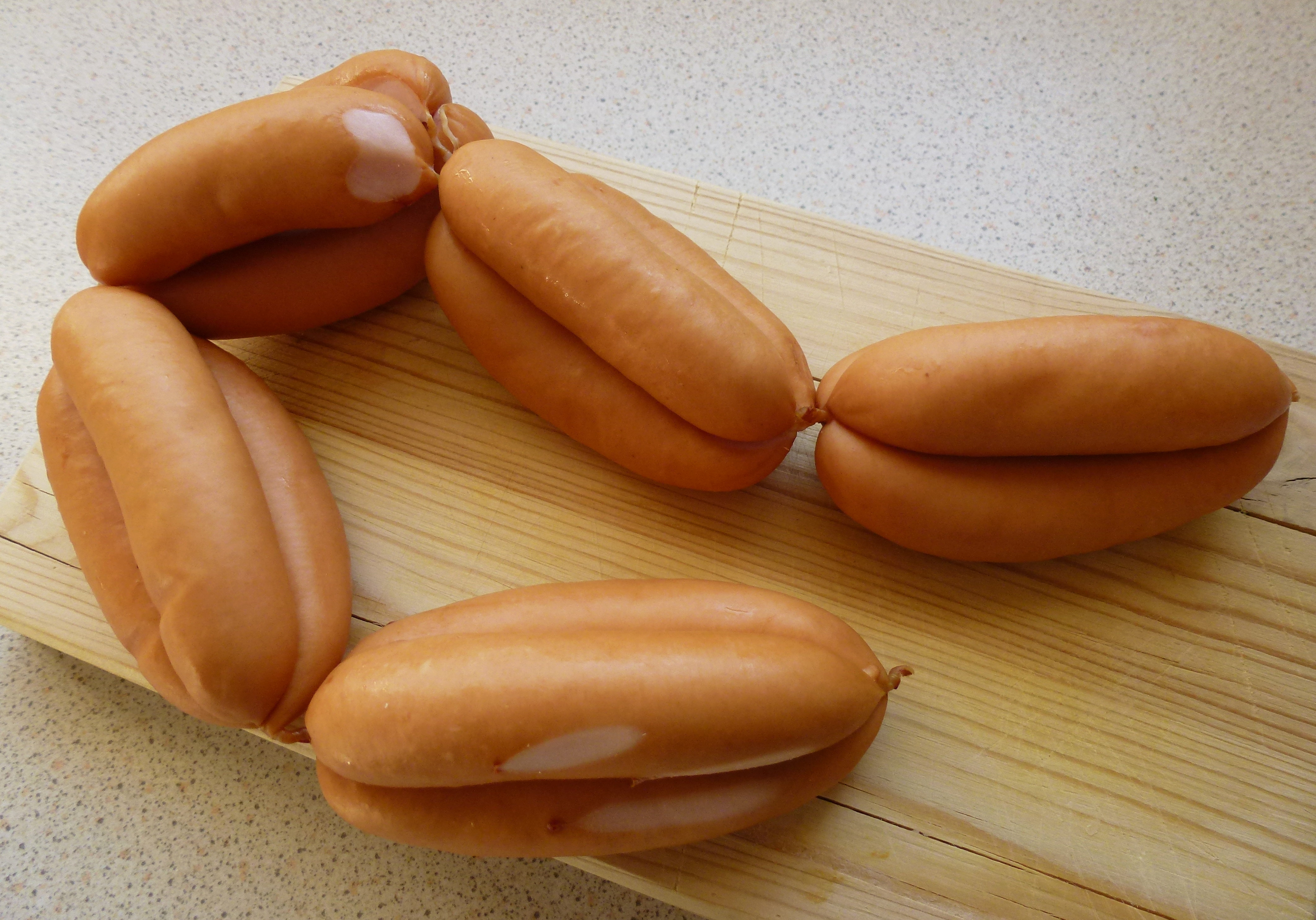
Prinskorvar, "prince sausages"

Prinskorv, which directly translates to "prince sausage", is a small Swedish sausage which is often sold in links. Created in 1805 by Viennese butcher Georg Lahner, this dish is usually fried in a frying pan and served with a generous helping of mustard. The demand increases and reaches its peak during the Christmas season. At that time, stores usually have reserves to meet their customers' needs.

== Serving ==
Traditionally made from spiced pork and veal stuffed in sheep casings, these mini-sausages are known for their crown-like cuts. They are a short variety of Vienna sausage. The Prinskorv is a popular component of the julbord and the Swedish Christmas smörgåsbord, along with ham, liver pate, potatoes, rice pudding, pickled beets, herring salad, various cheeses, bread, and different sweets.

According to the Swedish food chain Hemköp, the Prinskorv is also a midsummer favorite of Sweden's southern region. Enjoyed during afternoons and featured during their midsummer party after the summer solstice, this is usually served with Janssons frestelse, meatballs, pickled herring, crackers and salads.

== See also ==
- List of sausages
