= Babelutte =

Sort of toffee

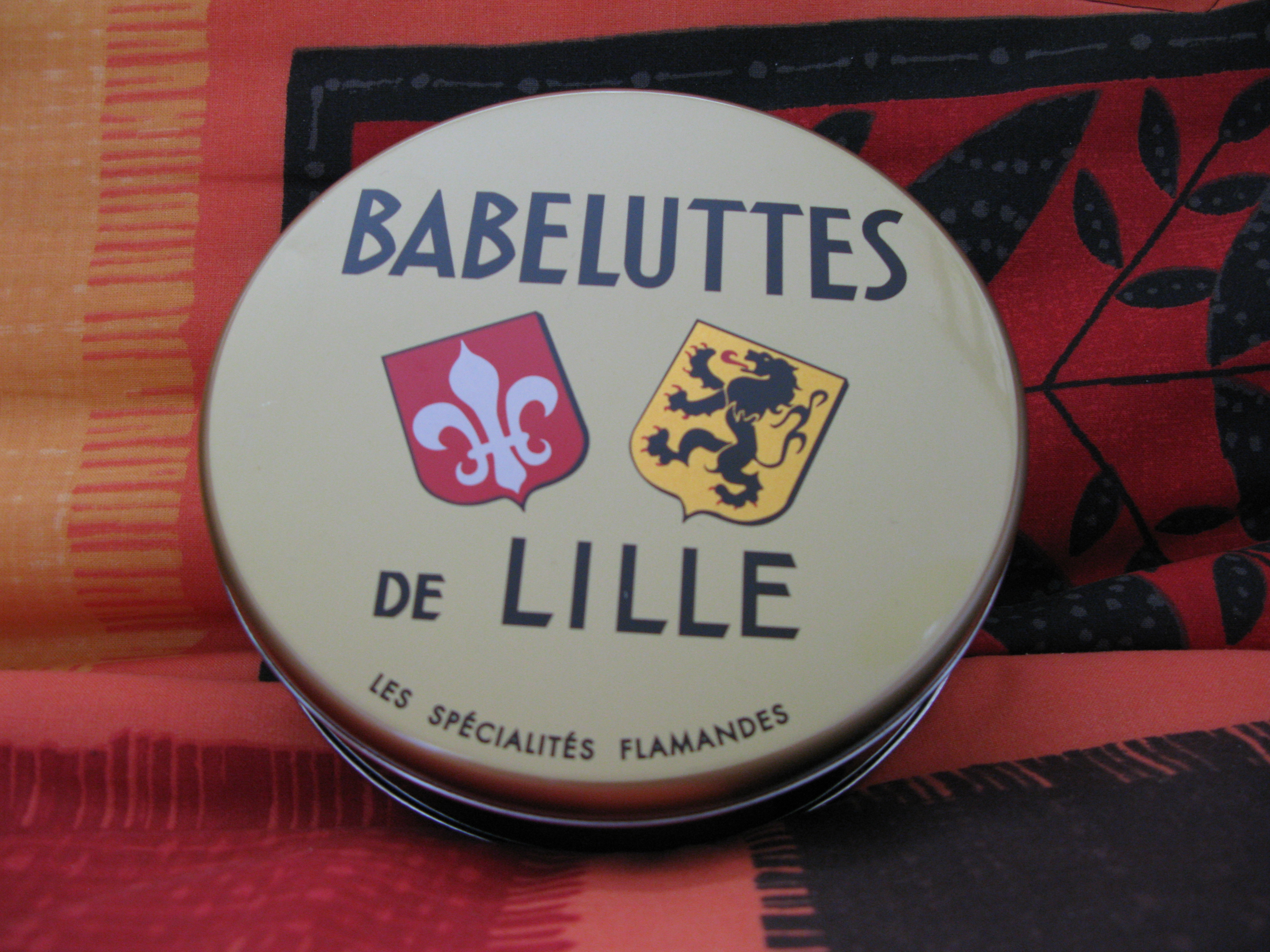
A tin of Babeluttes de Lille

A Babelutte is a sort of long toffee flavoured with honey or vergeoise (demerara sugar) from Veurne, in Westhoek (West Flanders, Belgium). The candy is closely related to Butterscotch.

== Etymology ==
The name is likely to come from the Flemish "babbelen", speaking a lot, and "uit", finished because when you eat the toffee, you cannot speak anymore (either because you are enjoying it or because you cannot open the mouth). An opposing but similar explanation attributes the origin of the word to "babbelle" (which means "chatty" in Ch'ti).

== History ==
The candy originates from the 19th century, from a couple that prepared and sold it to tourists on Belgian coastal beaches.

== Babelutte de Lille ==
The Babelutte de Lille is a famous babelutte in the Nord-Pas-de-Calais.

== Brands and companies ==
Moeder Babelutte is a small chain of shops in western Flanders that purveys babelutte, along with other sweets.
