= Cranz (surname) =

Cranz is a German surname. Notable people with the surname include:

- August Friedrich Cranz (1737–1801), German writer
- Christl Cranz (1914–2004), German skier
- Cynthia Cranz (born 1969), American voice actress
- Friedrich-Carl Cranz (1886–1941), General of the Wehrmacht during World War II
- Galen Cranz, professor of architecture at the University of California, Berkeley
- Rudolf Cranz (1918–1941), German skier
