= Gajak =

Indian confection

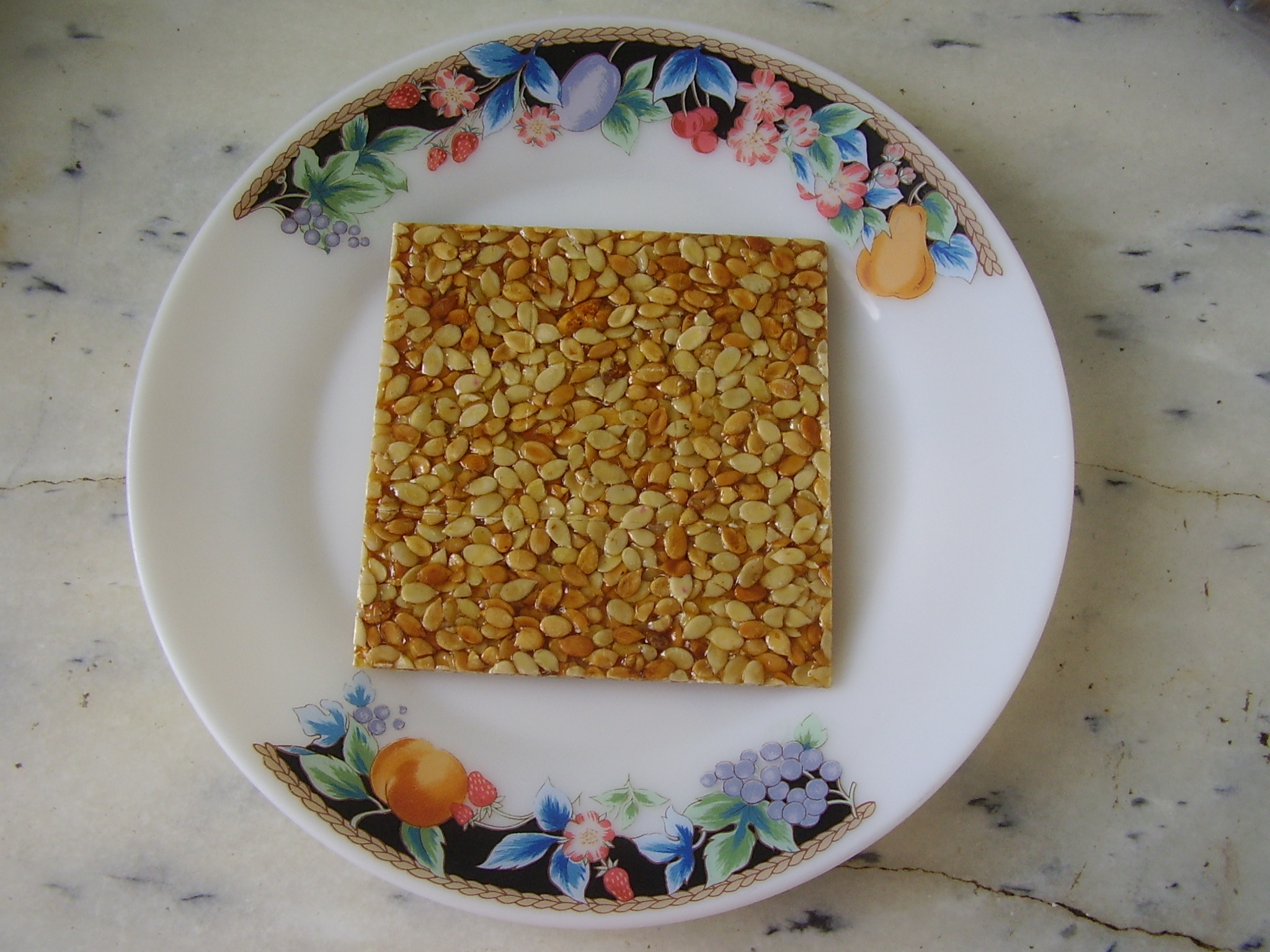
- Alternative names: Tilsakri, Tilpatti, Tilpapdi
- Type: Sweet
- Course: Dessert, confection
- Place of origin: India
- Main ingredients: Sesame seeds, jaggery, peanuts
- Variations: Gond gajak, chocolate gajak, dry fruit gajak, Pista gajak

Gajak, also known as Tilsakri, Tilpatti or Tilpapdi) is a confection originating in north-central India. It is a dry sweet made of sesame seeds (til), jaggery, and sometimes peanuts. The sesame seeds (til) are cooked in the raw sugar syrup and set in thin layers, which can be stored for months.

== Preparation ==
Gajak is prepared with sesame seeds and jaggery with a method of preparation which is time-consuming. It takes about 10–15 hours to prepare 5–8 kilograms of gajak. The dough is hammered until all the sesame seeds break down and release their oils into the dough.

One kilogram of Gajak requires about one-fourth of jaggery to sesame. Varieties can include dry fruits.

== Varieties ==
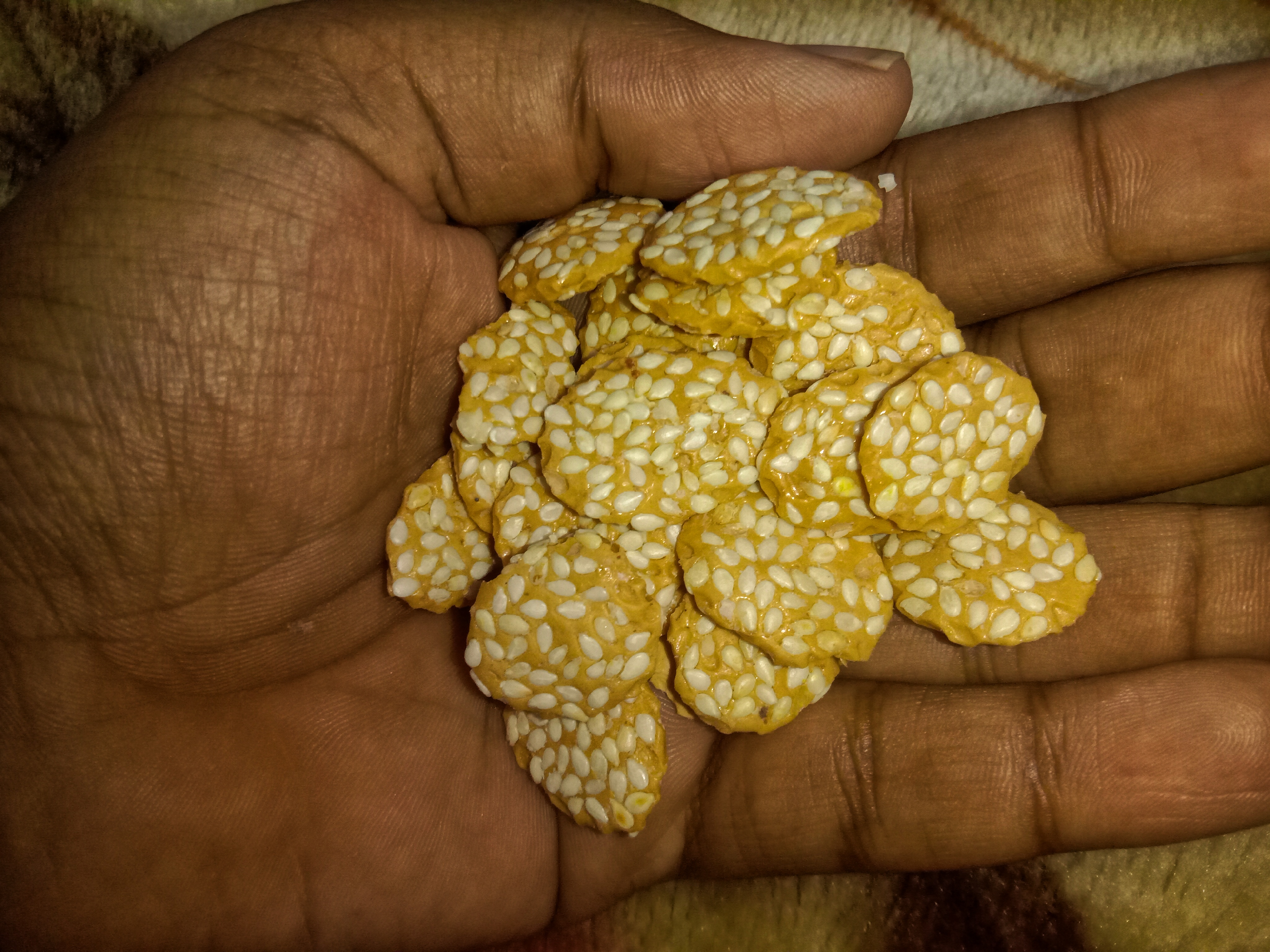
Gur Rewadi from Lucknow

Ingredients and shape can vary. By ingredient,

- Gud-til gajak
- Til-revadi gajak
- Karari tilsakri
- Til-Mawa gajak

== See also ==
- Brittle
- Chikki
- List of sesame seed dishes
