= Krantz =

Krantz is a surname.

== Geographical distribution ==
As of 2014, 59.1% of all known bearers of the surname Krantz were residents of the United States (frequency 1:40,458), 22.7% of Sweden (1:2,867), 4.2% of France (1:105,067), 3.9% of Germany (1:136,212), 1.7% of Canada (1:142,077), 1.4% of Israel (1:39,650) and 1.4% of South Africa (1:260,746).

In Sweden, the frequency of the surname was higher than national average (1:2,867) in the following regions:

1. Gävleborg County (1:1,245)
2. Jönköping County (1:1,269)
3. Västra Götaland County (1:1,980)
4. Kalmar County (1:2,038)
5. Kronoberg County (1:2,175)
6. Halland County (1:2,216)
7. Uppsala County (1:2,776)

== People ==
- Albert Krantz (1448–1517), German historian
- Gordon Krantz (born 1937), Canadian politician
- Grover Krantz (1931–2002), American Bigfoot researcher
- Harold Krantz (1906–1999), architect in Western Australia
- Jacob Krantz (1900–1977), American actor better known as Ricardo Cortez
- Jules François Émile Krantz, French naval officer and politician
- Judith Krantz (1928–2019), American author and journalist
- Kermit E. Krantz (1923–2007), American surgeon and inventor
- Maja Krantz, (born 1987), Swedish (soccer) footballer
- Steve Krantz (1923–2007), American film producer and writer
- Steven G. Krantz (born 1951), American mathematician
- Tobias Krantz (born 1971), Swedish politician
- Wayne Krantz, American musician

== See also ==
- Kranz (surname)
- Cranz (disambiguation)
