= Toffo (toffee) =

British brand of toffee

- Varieties of the original Toffos
- Product type: Toffee
- Produced by: Rowntree Mackintosh Confectionery (after 1969); Mackintosh's (before 1969)
- Country: United Kingdom
- Discontinued: 2005

Toffo was a British brand of toffee, produced by Mackintosh's. They came individually wrapped, in a roll, and were available in plain, mint, and assorted (apple, chocolate, strawberry, pineapple, banana, and mint) flavours.

Toffo was one of Mackintosh's main brands, along with Polo, Quality Street, Toffee Crisp, Fox's Glacier Mints, and Caramac. Its original advertising slogan was "a man's gotta chew what a man's gotta chew". Production was taken over by Rowntree Mackintosh Confectionery after Rowntree's merged with Mackintosh's in 1969.

Toffo was discontinued in 2005 before being resurrected by Nestlé, in a small 19.2g tube, produced in the United Arab Emirates.
