= Lonavala chikki =

Indian sweet

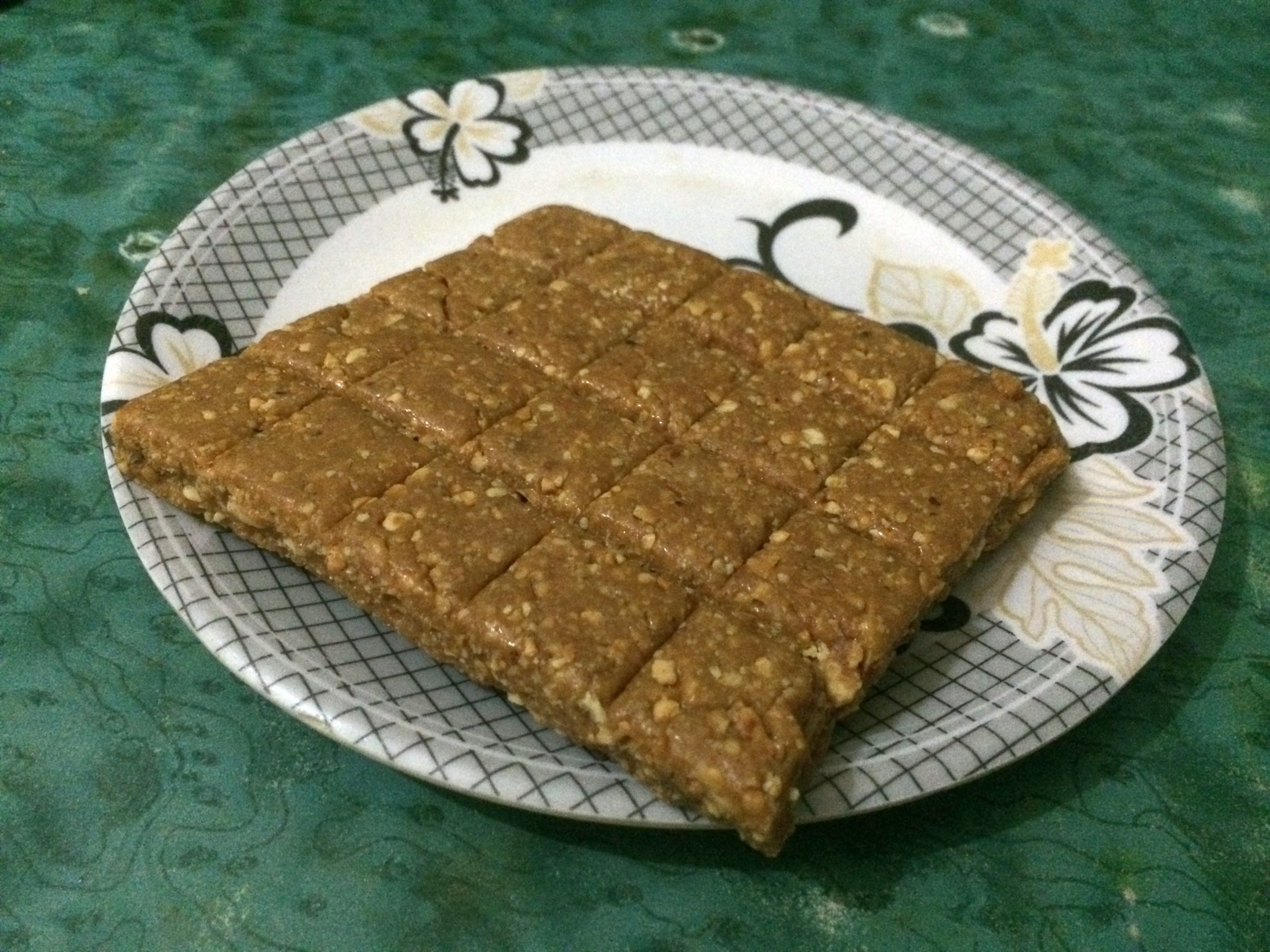
Lonavala chikki

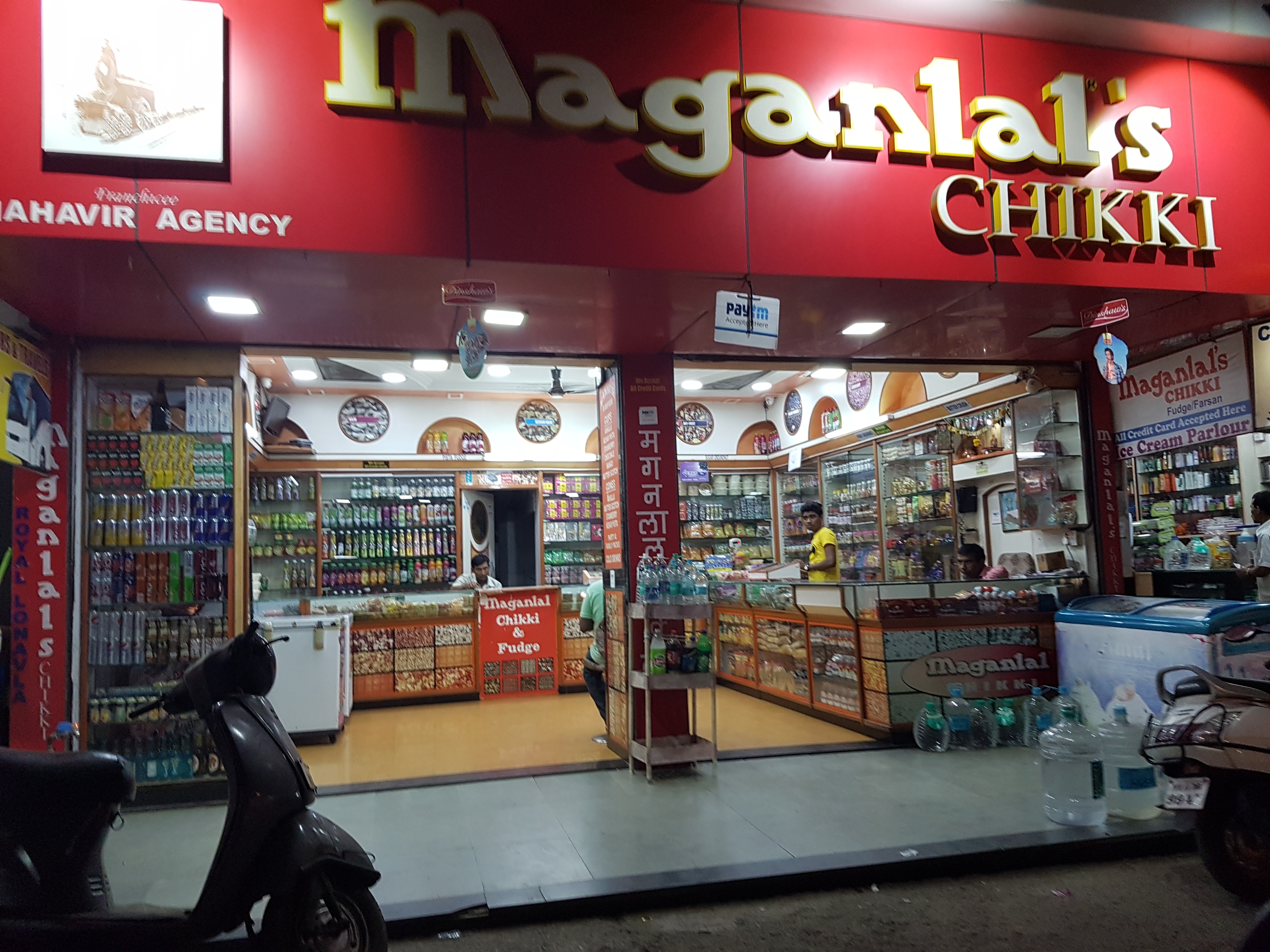
Maganlal's chikki

Lonavala chikki is an Indian sweet named after Lonavala, a town in Pune district of Maharashtra India. It is a type of chikki or guddani, a confection made from jaggery, ground nuts and ghee. The product was sold by Maganlal Agarwal from his sweet meat shop in Lonavala, and packaged by railway authorities and sold to train travellers between Lonavala and Mumbai. Encouraged by this, Agarwal renamed the product "Maganlal chikki", and it later became and continues to be called Lonavala chikki.

Another source attributes Bhimraj Agarwal with having invented it as guddani that he sold to workers who laid the railway tracks along the Khandala ghat. The confection has been described as "hard, brittle and crisp, light brown in colour with a definite gloss", also as a "nutty nougat confectionery."

== Geographical indication ==
A 2010 news story reports of attempts to obtain Geographical Indication registration for the chikki.
