= Fläskkorv =

Swedish pork sausage

Fläskkorv (Swedish for 'pork sausage') is a Swedish sausage made largely or entirely from pork. Traditionally it is sold raw (though now it is not uncommon to find precooked varieties), and often served during the Christmas smörgåsbord (Julbord).

A typical accompaniment is rotmos, a dish made from mashed carrots, potatoes and rutabagas (swedes).

== See also ==
- List of sausages
