= Toffee =

Confection made by caramelizing sugar or molasses along with butter and flour

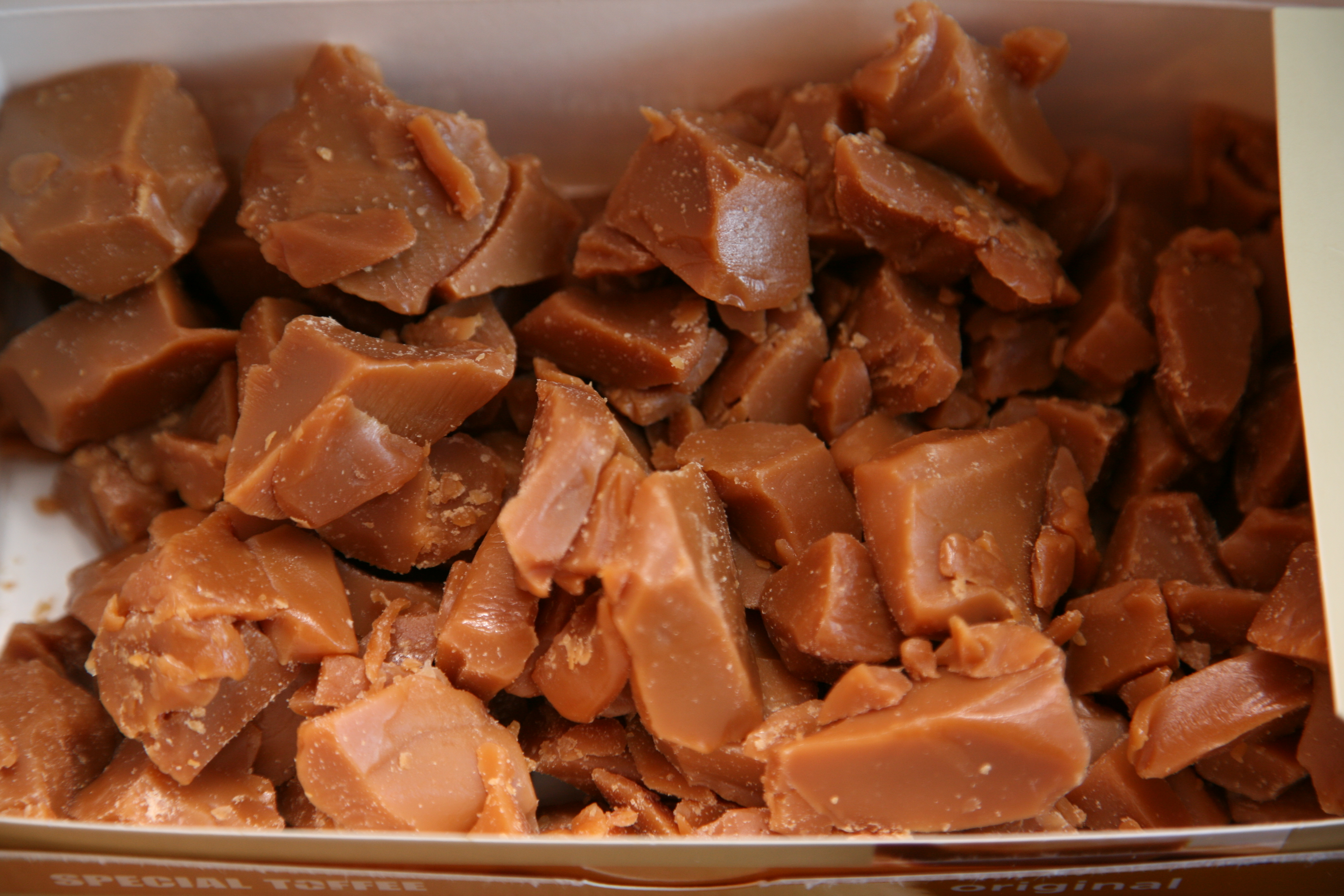
- Type: Confectionery
- Course: Dessert
- Place of origin: England
- Main ingredients: Sugar or molasses, butter
- Variations: English toffee, honeycomb toffee

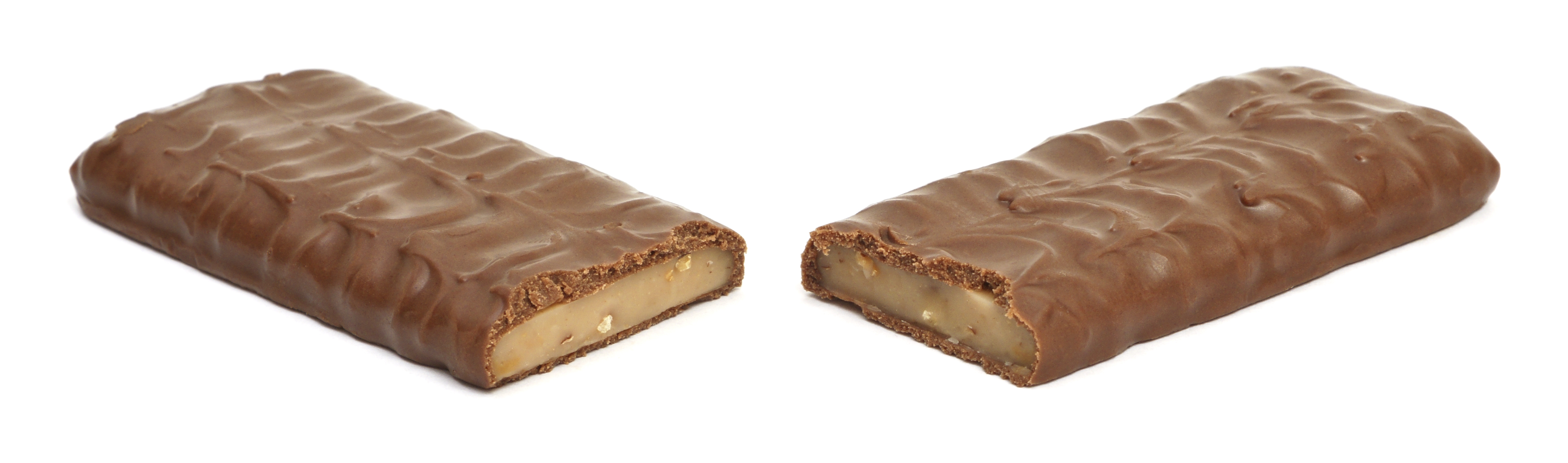
A Heath candy bar, which is English toffee coated in milk chocolate

Toffee is an English confection made by caramelizing sugar or molasses (creating inverted sugar) along with butter, and occasionally flour. The mixture is heated until its temperature reaches the hard crack stage of 149 to 154 °C (300 to 310 °F). While being prepared, toffee is sometimes mixed with nuts or raisins.

== Variants and applications ==
A popular variant in the United States is English toffee, which is a very buttery toffee often made with almonds. It is available in both chewy and hard versions. Heath bars are a brand of confection made with an English toffee core. Although named English toffee, it bears little resemblance to the wide range of confectionery known as toffee currently available in the United Kingdom. However, one can still find this product in the UK under the name "butter crunch".

== Etymology ==
The origins of the word are unknown. Food writer Harold McGee claims it to be "from the Creole for a mixture of sugar and molasses", but which creole language is not specified. The Oxford English Dictionary dates the first publication of the word to 1825 and identifies it as a variation of the word taffy (1817), both of which are first recorded as English dialectical words.

== See also ==
- Taffy (candy)
- Toffee hammer
- Toffo
- Tablet (confectionery)
- Tameletjie
- Almond Roca
- Babelutte
- Bonfire toffee
- Butterscotch
- Caramel
- Caramel candy
- Coconut toffee
- Dulce de leche
- Fudge
- Knäck
- Krówki
- Moffat toffee
- Peanut brittle
- Russian candy
- Sticky toffee pudding
