= James P. Kranz Jr. =

James P. Kranz Jr. (September 5, 1912 – August 13, 1982) was an American lawyer and director of the Pioneer Fund (1948).

Kranz was born September 5, 1912. He graduated from University of the South, then earned his law degree at Harvard Law School. Like other Pioneer Fund director John Marshall Harlan II, Kranz practiced at Root, Clark, Buckner, Howland and Ballantine.
