= Hermann Branz =

German philatelist

Hermann Branz (26 January 1920 – 28 November 2004) was a German philatelist who was added to the Roll of Distinguished Philatelists in 1982.

Branz was awarded the Lindenberg Medal in 1986.
