= Knäck =

Swedish confectionery

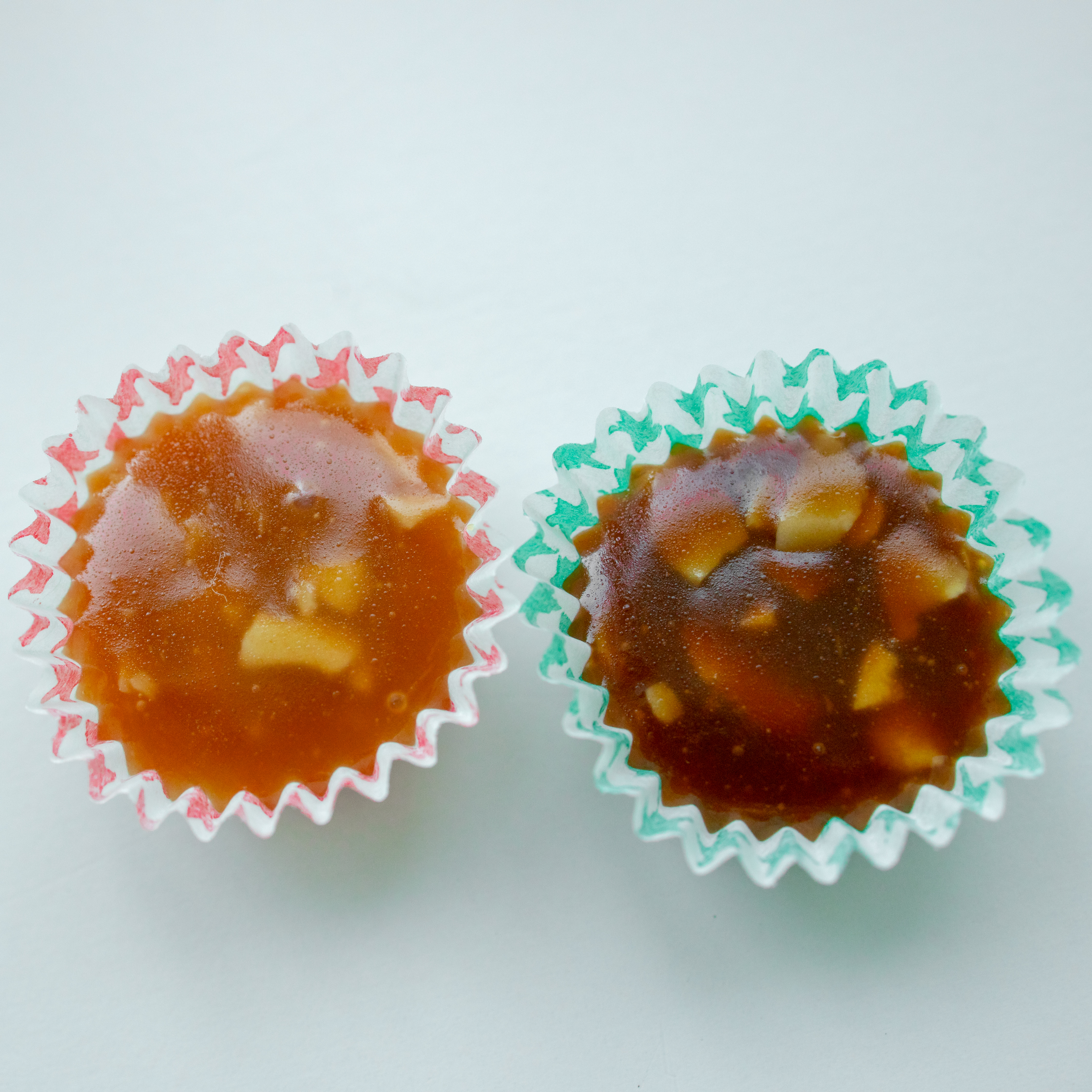
- Two pieces of knäck. Left one made with Swedish light syrup (ljus sirap), right one made with the dark variety (mörk sirap).
- Type: Toffee
- Place of origin: Sweden
- Main ingredients: Heavy cream, sugar, golden syrup, butter

Knäck or Christmas Butterscotch is a traditional Swedish toffee prepared at Christmas. The name translates into "snap" and refers to its hard consistency (reminiscent of Daim or Skor bars).
