= Cranz =

Cranz may refer to:

== People ==
- Cranz (surname)

== Places ==
- German name of Zelenogradsk, a town in the Kaliningrad Oblast, Russia
- Cranz, Hamburg a quarter in the Harburg, borough of Hamburg
