= Simon Kranitz =

German footballer

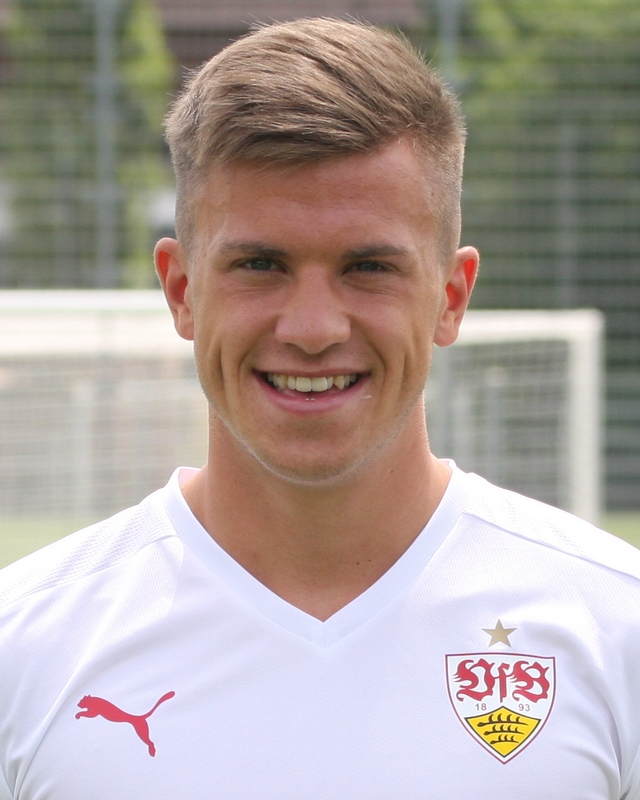
- Kranitz in 2015

Personal information
- Date of birth: 5 June 1996 (age 30)
- Place of birth: Böblingen, Germany
- Height: 1.78 m (5 ft 10 in)
- Position: Midfielder

Team information
- Current team: FC Nöttingen
- Number: 5

Youth career
- –2007: SV Böblingen
- 2007–2014: VfB Stuttgart

Senior career*
Years	Team	Apps	(Gls)
2014–2016	VfB Stuttgart II	2	(0)
2014–2015	→ SpVgg Unterhaching (loan)	16	(0)
2014–2015	→ SpVgg Unterhaching II (loan)	7	(0)
2016–2018	TSV Steinbach	34	(0)
2018–2020	Astoria Walldorf	25	(0)
2020–	FC Nöttingen	89	(9)

International career
2011	Germany U15	2	(0)
2011–2012	Germany U16	5	(1)
2012–2013	Germany U17	9	(0)
2013	Germany U18	6	(1)
- * Club domestic league appearances and goals as of 11:39, 28 December 2024 (UTC)

Simon Kranitz (born 5 June 1996) is a German footballer who plays as a midfielder for FC Nöttingen.

== Career ==
=== Club career ===
Kranitz moved from SV Böblingen to VfB Stuttgart as a youth player in 2007. Here, he joined the club's academy, where he played for a few years. On 17 July 2014, Kranitz joined SpVgg Unterhaching on loan until the end of the season from VfB Stuttgart in search of more playing time, having struggled with knee problems for much of 2014. He made 16 appearances in the 3. Liga for Unterhaching before he returned to VfB Stuttgart.

In the 2015-16 season he was back in Stuttgart, but only played two games for the club's reserve team as he struggled with knee problems again for most of the season. He transferred to TSV Steinbach in the summer of 2016, where he spent the following two seasons. He then moved to FC Astoria Walldorf ahead of the 2018/2019 season, where played there for two years.

In the summer of 2020 Kranitz moved to FC Nöttingen. In April 2022 he signed a two-year contract extension.
