= Gozinaki =

Georgian confection made with nuts

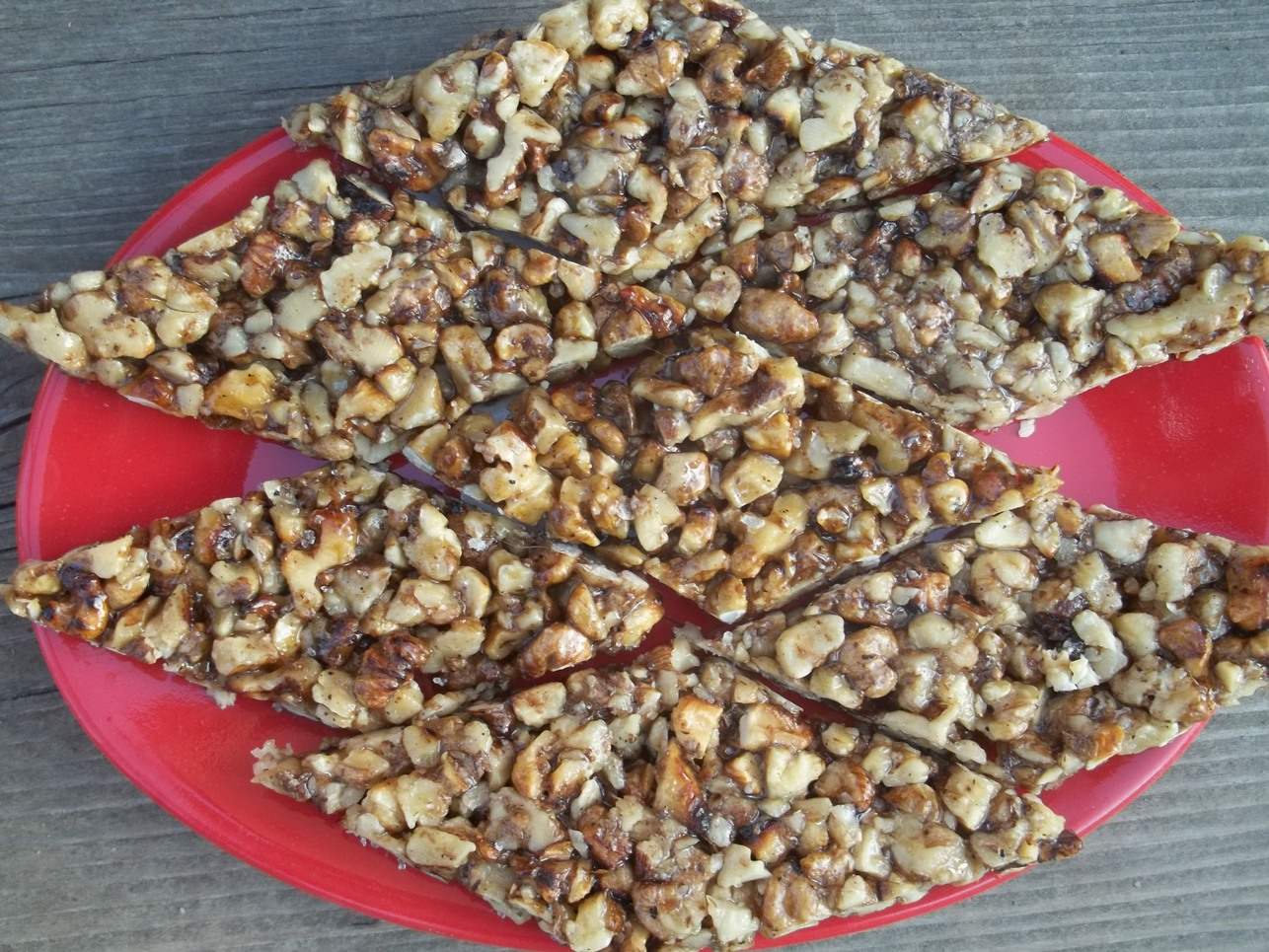
- Type: Confectionery
- Place of origin: Georgia
- Main ingredients: Nuts (usually walnuts), honey

Gozinaki (Georgian: გოზინაყი, romanized: gozinaq'i, pronounced [ɡozinaqʼi]) is a traditional Georgian brittle confection made of caramelized nuts, usually walnuts, and fried in honey. In the western Georgian provinces of Imereti and Racha, it was sometimes called "churchkhela", a name more commonly applied to walnuts sewn onto a string, dipped in thickened white grape juice and dried. In several of Georgia's rural areas, both walnuts and honey used to have sacral associations. According to a long-established tradition, Gozinaki is served at special occasions, and is a mandatory component of New Year's Eve and Christmas celebrations.

== See also ==
- Alegría (Mexican candy)
- Brittle (food)
- Churchkhela: an array of dishes similar to Gozinaki
- Chikki
- Florentine biscuit
- Halva
- Sesame seed candy
- Yeot-gangjeong
