= Kranz (surname) =

Kranz is a German language-derived surname; in German the word means wreath.

== People ==
- Ashley Kranz, winner of CMT Canada's "CMT Casting Call 2007"
- Bernhard Kranz, German highly decorated Hauptmann der Reserve in the Wehrmacht during World War II
- Carl Frederick Kranz, German-born minister and teacher, founder of the German Evangelical Proseminary, founding pree2sident of Elmhurst College in Elmhurst, Illinois
- Fran Kranz (born 1981), American actor
- Gene Kranz (born 1933), American NASA flight director and manager
- George Kranz, German dance music singer and percussionist
- Hugo Kranz, German-born businessman and political figure in Ontario, Canada
- Jacob ben Wolf Kranz, Jewish Lithuania (Belarus)-born preacher (maggid)
- James P. Kranz Jr., American lawyer
- Ken Kranz (1923–2017), American NFL football player
- Markus Kranz (born 1969), German football coach and former player
- Oswald Kranz (born 1953), Liechtenstein politician
- Paula Dean Broadwell (née Kranz), American writer, academic, and anti-terrorism professional
- Stanislaus Kranz, birth name of Stanley Cortez, an American cinematographer
- Walther Kranz (1884–1960), German Classical philologist and historian of philosophy
- Werner Kranz (born 1965), Liechtenstein politician

== Places ==
- Kranz Peak, a peak in the Queen Maud Mountains
- Kręcko (German: Kranz), a village in western Poland
- Kranzburg, town in South Dakota

== Other ==
- Frankfurter Kranz, a cake specialty believed to originate from Frankfurt am Main, Germany
- Kranz anatomy, a characteristic leaf anatomy often possessed by C4 plants
- Professor Kranz tedesco di Germania, a 1978 Italian comedy film
