= László Kránitz =

Hungarian politician

Member of the National Assembly
- In office 2 December 2013 – 5 May 2014
- In office 15 May 2002 – 13 May 2010

Personal details
- Born: 16 July 1973 (age 52) Kapuvár, Hungary
- Party: MSZP (since 1990)
- Profession: politician

László Kránitz (born 16 July 1973) is a Hungarian politician, member of the National Assembly (MP) from 2002 to 2010 and from 2013 to 2014. He is a member of the Hungarian Socialist Party (MSZP).

== Career ==
Kránitz was born in Kapuvár on 16 July 1973. He spent his childhood in Beled. He finished his secondary studies in Sopron, where he lives with his wife and two children. He attended the University of Pécs and studied HR management.

He joined the Socialist Party in 1990, at the age of 17. He became a member of the party's youth wing Movement of Young Socialists in the next year. He was elected representative in the assembly of Sopron during the 1998 municipal election. There he worked in the education, sports and youth committee. He held the position until 2002. He became chairman of the party's branch in Sopron in October 2000. During the 2002 parliamentary election, he was elected a Member of Parliament from the MSZP's Győr-Moson-Sopron County regional list. He was a member of the Committee on Foreign Affairs between 2002 and 2010 and the Tourism Committee from 2002 to 2006. After the 2002 municipal election, he worked as political advisor of Dezső Walter, the newly elected mayor of Sopron.

Kránitz was re-elected MP during the 2006 parliamentary election, when he was elected from the Socialist Party's national list. He maintained his membership in the Committee on Foreign Affairs, while he was also involved in the Environmental Protection Committee since May 2008. He lost his parliamentary seat in the 2010 parliamentary election. Following that he became a board member of the Public Service Foundation, serving in this capacity from October 2010 to November 2013. After incumbent MP László Mandur was elected to that body, he resigned from his parliamentary mandate. He was succeeded by Kránitz in December 2013 (again per the MSZP's national list), who was active in the Culture and Press Committee until the 2014 parliamentary election. Following that he was appointed director of the party's Free Press Foundation (Szabad Sajtó Alapítvány) and chairman of the Győr-Moson-Sopron County party branch.
