= Jansson's temptation =

Swedish potato casserole

Jansson's Temptation
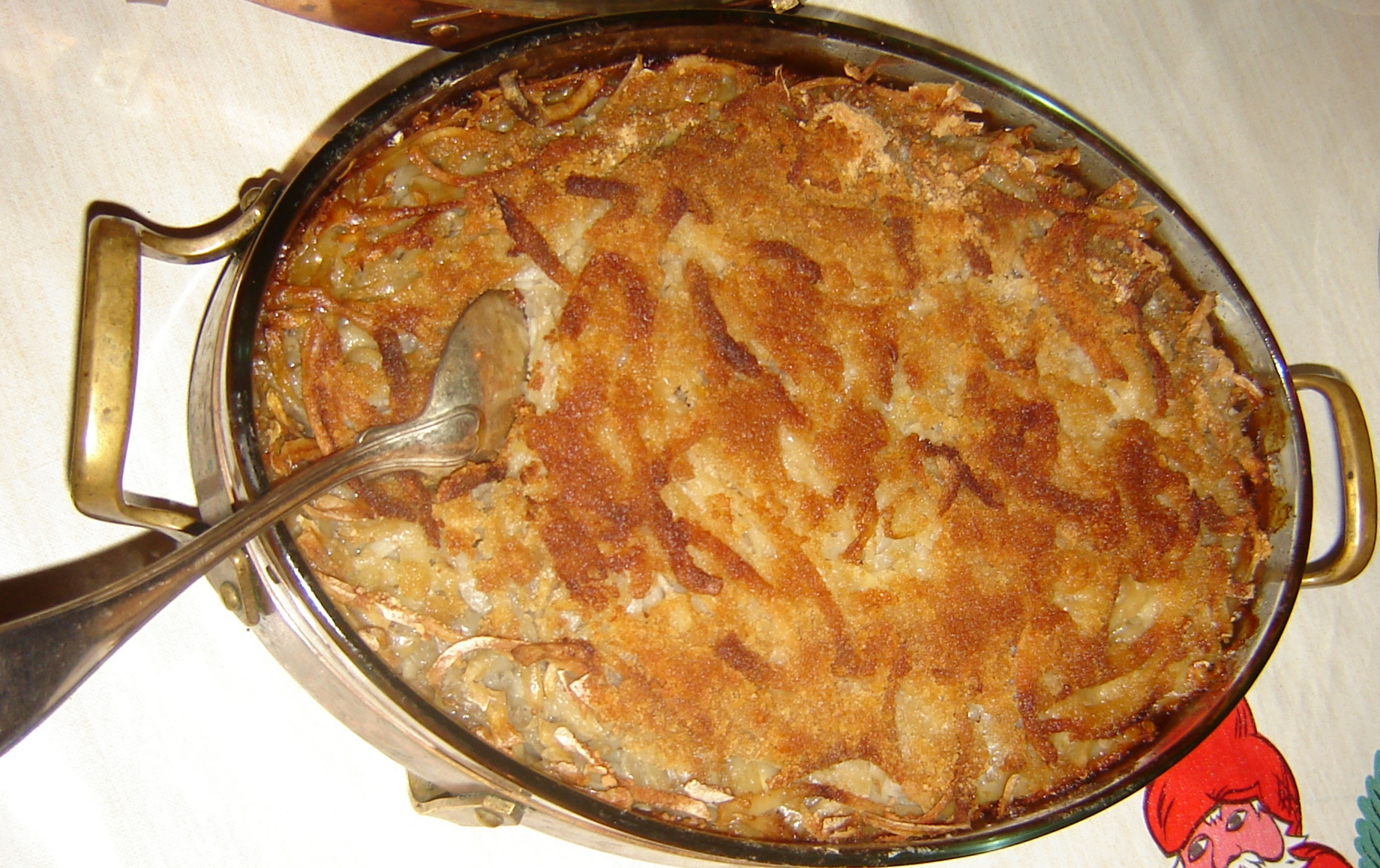
- Type: Casserole
- Place of origin: Sweden
- Main ingredients: Potatoes, onions, pickled sprats and cream

Jansson's Temptation (Swedish: Janssons frestelse (Swedish pronunciation: [ˈjɑ̌ːnsɔns ˈfrɛ̂sːtɛlsɛ])) is a traditional Swedish casserole made of potatoes, onions, pickled sprats and cream. It is typically served as a late night meal before the guests leave a party. These days, it is also commonly included in a Swedish julbord (Christmas smörgåsbord), and the Easter påskbuffé, which is lighter than a traditional julbord. The dish is also common in Finland where it is known as janssoninkiusaus.

== Preparation ==
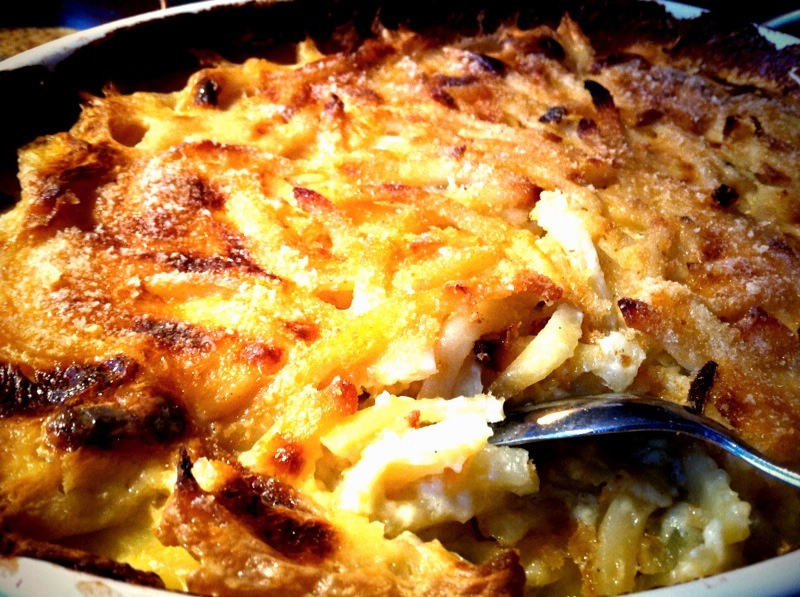
Close-up view of a Janssons frestelse dish

The potatoes are cut into thin strips and layered in a roasting tin, alternating with the sprats and chopped onions in between. Salt and pepper is put over each layer, then cream is added so that it almost fills the tin. It is finally baked in an oven at 200 °C (392 °F) for about one hour.

The type of fish used in this dish is often mistranslated into English, writing anchovies when it should be sprats. This is because sprats (Sprattus sprattus) pickled in sugar, salt and spices have been known in Sweden as ansjovis since the middle of the 19th century, while true anchovies (Engraulis encrasicolus) are sold in Sweden as sardeller (sardelles). Small herrings (Clupea harengus) may be used instead of sprats.

== Name and origin ==
It has often been associated with the opera singer Per Adolf "Pelle" Janzon (1844–1889), remembered as a gourmand, but any connection with him is unlikely, according to food writer Jens Linder. Another claim for the origin of the name has been made by Gunnar Stigmark (1910–2001) in his article "Så var det med Janssons frestelse", which appeared in the periodical Gastronomisk kalender. According to Stigmark, his mother and a cook she had hired to prepare a dinner party wanted to give the familiar dish a special name, and decided to use the name of the film Janssons frestelse (1928) featuring the actor and director Edvin Adolphson; from that party the name spread to other households and eventually into cookbooks.

According to Linder the dish did not become associated with Christmas dinner until the 1970s.

== See also ==
- List of casserole dishes
