= Xenien =

Xenien is a Germanization of the Greek Xenia "host gifts", a title originally applied by the Roman poet Martial (1st century AD) to a collection of poems which were to accompany his presents.

Following this precedent, Johann Wolfgang von Goethe named a collection of distichs, which he wrote together with Friedrich Schiller, Die Xenien, in which the two friends avenged themselves on opposing critics. They were first published in the Musenalmanach. The Xenien were prompted by the indifference and animosity of contemporary criticism, and its disregard for what the two poets regarded as the higher interests of German poetry. The Xenien succeeded as a retaliation on the critics, but the masterpieces which followed them proved in the long run much more effective weapons against the prevailing opinions.
