= Alegría (Mexican candy) =

Mexican snack food

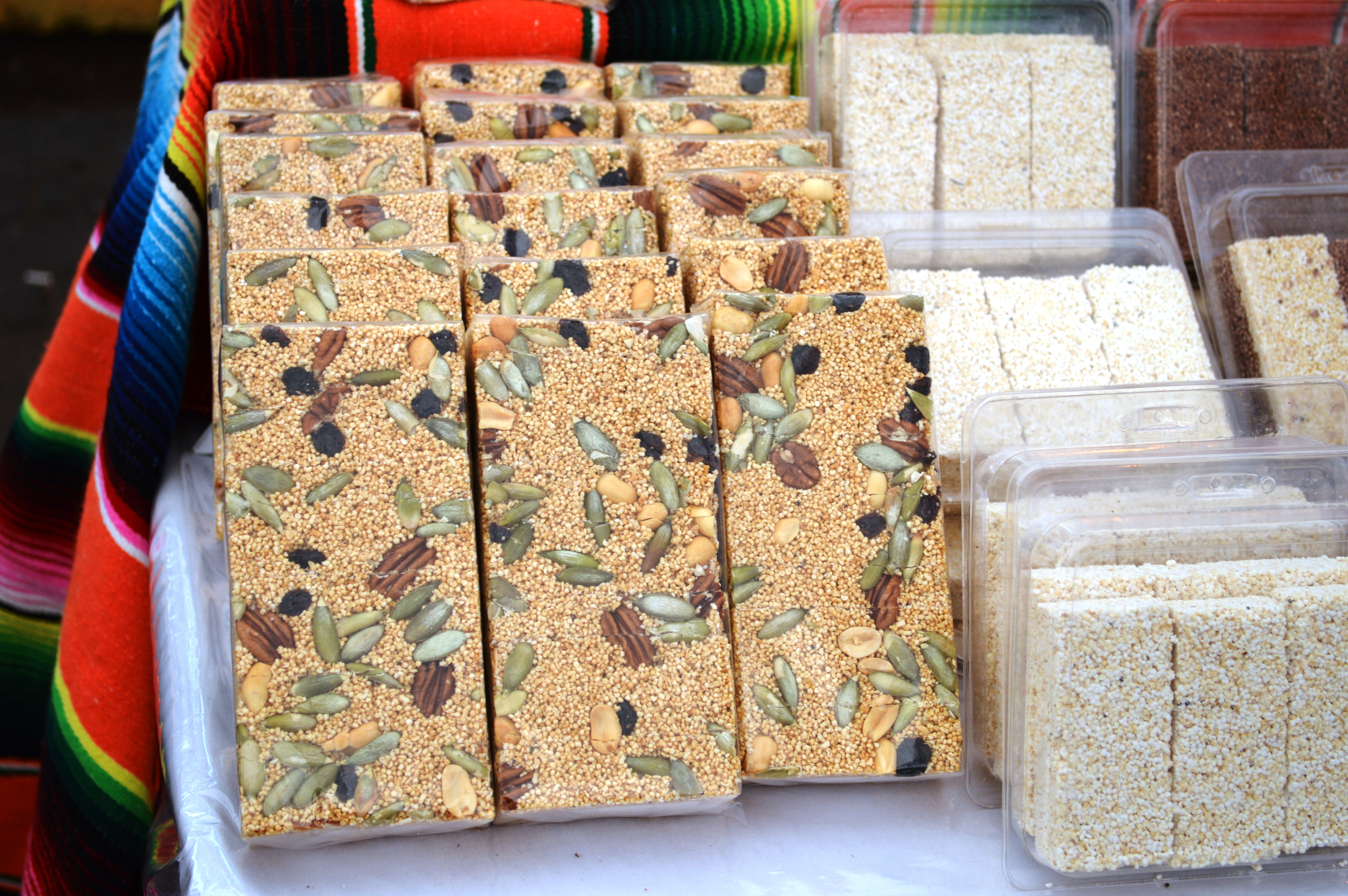
- Alegrías
- Type: Candy
- Course: Snack
- Place of origin: Mexico
- Ingredients generally used: Seeds of amaranth and honey or sugar

Alegría is a Mexican candy made from seeds of amaranth and honey or sugar that is produced mainly in the town of Santiago Tulyehualco in the Xochimilco borough of Mexico City. It has been known as alegría, Spanish for "joy," since the 16th century. The alegría of Tulyehualco was officially declared Patrimonio Cultural Intangible de la Ciudad de México (an intangible part of the cultural heritage of Mexico City) in September 2016.

Amaranth is a plant native to Mexico. In prehispanic times, in addition to forming part of the diet of the indigenous people, it was also used as currency and for ceremonial purposes. Figures of amaranth and honey were made as offerings to the gods. In order to stop those religious practices, Hernán Cortés banned the cultivation of amaranth, after which the plant began to fall into disuse because those who continued to cultivate it faced being put to death as punishment.

Alegrías have become the most popular way of consuming amaranth. These sweets are prepared by puffing the seeds in a hot pan without oil. The seeds begin puffing within seconds after being set on the hot pan. When finished cooking, the seeds are mixed with honey or sugar syrup and sometimes with added ingredients such as roasted seeds (e.g. peanut or pumpkin) or chopped dried fruits. Finally, the mixture is molded into different forms and is packaged for sale.

== See also ==
- Halva
- Sesame seed candy
- Gozinaki
