= Almond Roca =

Chocolate-almond-toffee candy

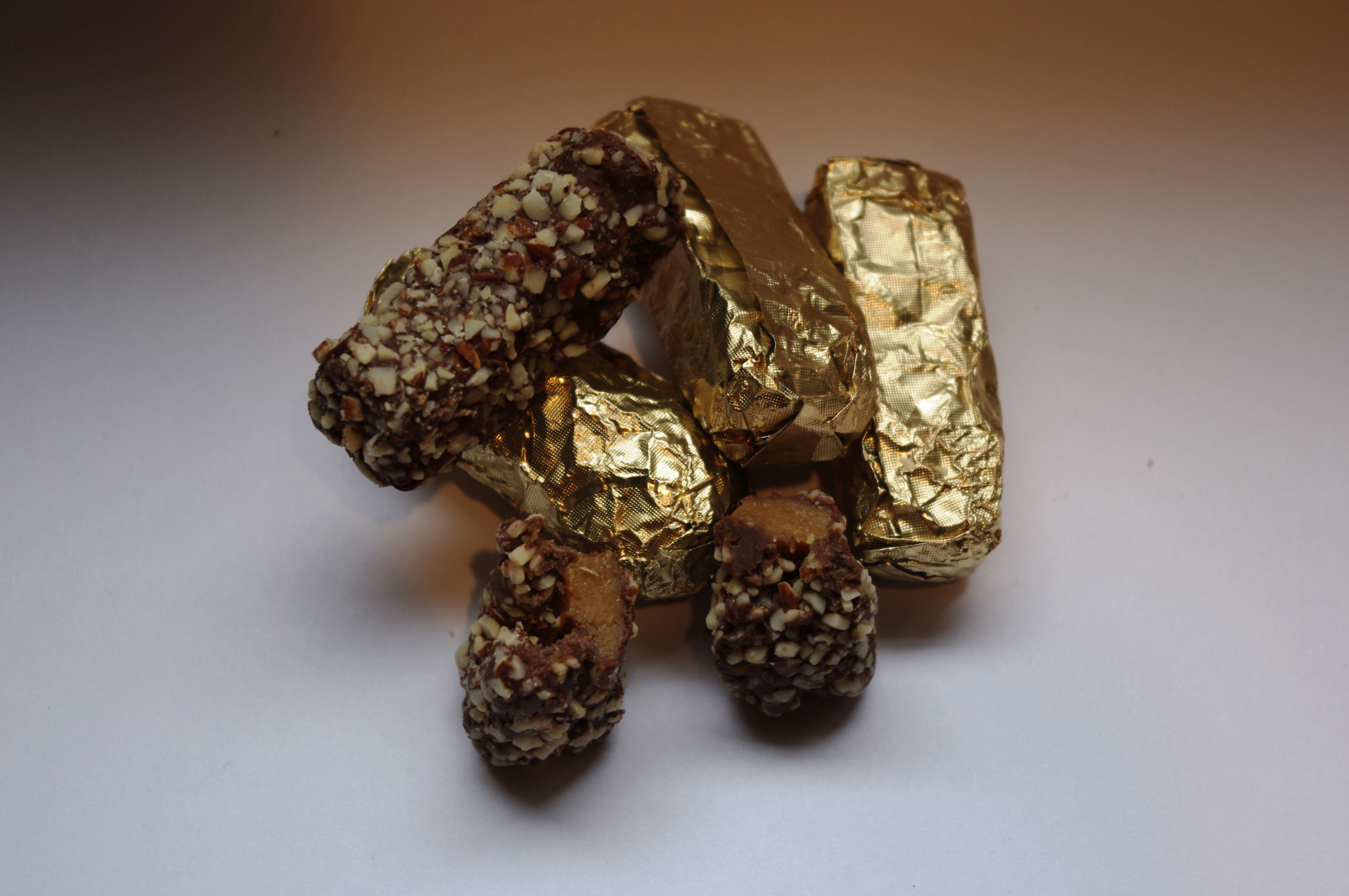
- Type: Chocolate-covered toffee
- Place of origin: United States
- Created by: Brown and Haley
- Main ingredients: Sugar, almonds, butter, vegetable oil, chocolate

Almond Roca is a brand of chocolate-covered, hard toffee with a coating of ground almonds. It is similar to chocolate-covered English toffee. The candy is manufactured by the Brown & Haley Co. of Tacoma, Washington, founded in 1912 by Harry Brown and J.C. Haley.

== Background ==
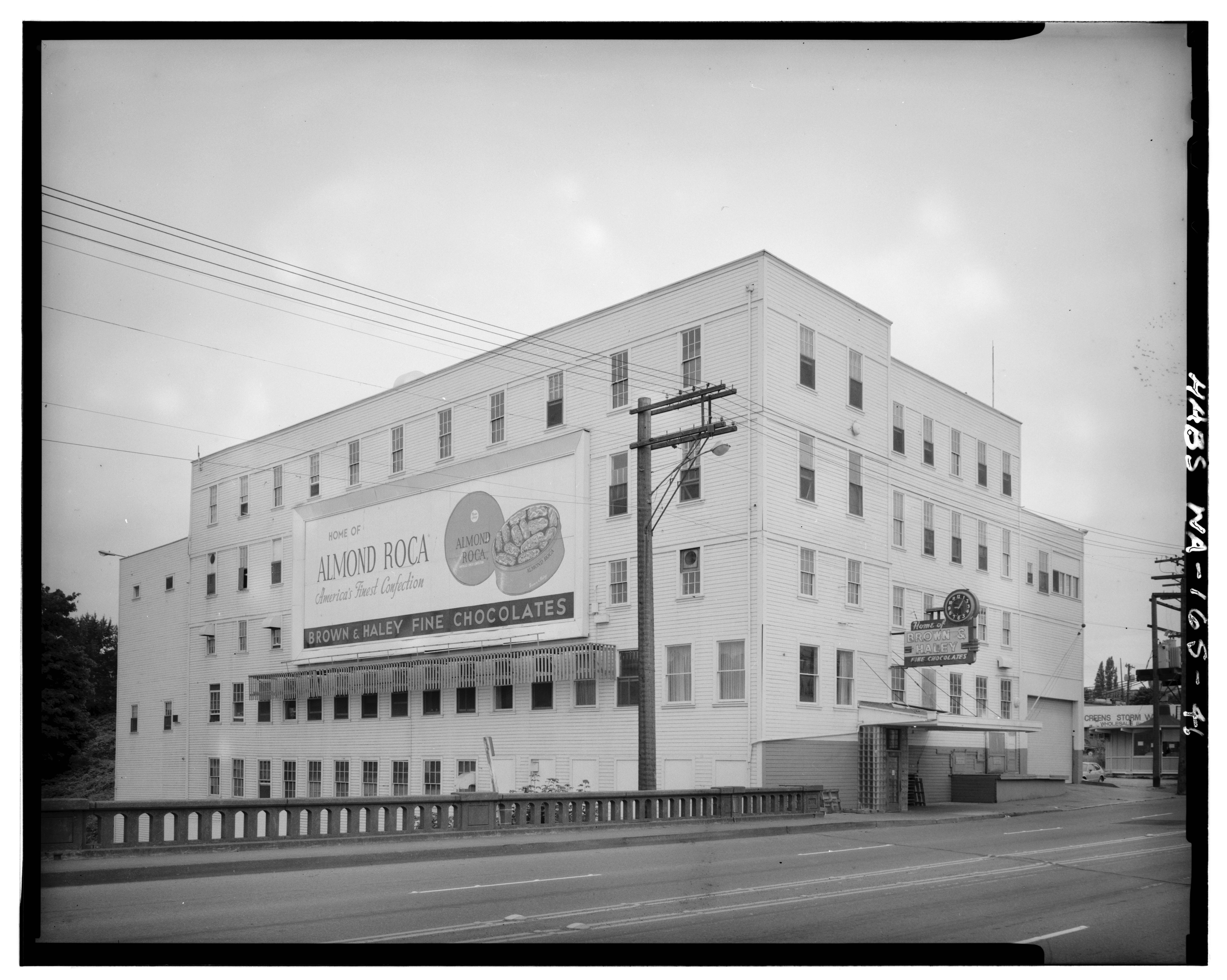
Brown & Haley factory, Tacoma

Almond Roca was invented in 1912 by Harry Brown and J. C. Haley, founders of Brown & Haley Company. The candy's name is said to have been inspired by Tacoma's head librarian, Jacqueline Noel, who chose the Spanish word roca, meaning 'rock' in English, to describe the hard, log-shaped confection. Brown owned a small confectionery store, and Haley worked for a spice company. They met at church in 1908 and started the business together in 1914 as the Oriole Candy Company. They changed the name to Brown and Haley in 1919. Brown & Haley first used Almond Roca's trademark pink tin can containers in 1927 to extend the product's shelf life. Individual pieces of Almond Roca candy are wrapped in gold-colored aluminum foil.

In 2009, the Washington state legislature attempted to designate Aplets & Cotlets the "official candy of the state of Washington". The proposal ultimately failed; some legislators from Western Washington thought the designation should go to Almond Roca.

== Ingredients ==
Almond Roca contains sugar, almonds, butter, palm oil, palm kernel oil, cocoa powder, whey, skim milk powder, soya lecithin, chocolate, and vanilla.

By company tradition, a small amount of the original 1923 batch of toffee is carried over into each subsequent batch of candy.

Empirical studies have shown that the chocolate-and-almond coating of the candy includes the equivalent of two average-sized almonds.

== Other varieties ==
Since 2003, Brown & Haley has expanded its line of chocolate-coated toffee, sea salt caramel, dark chocolate, cashew, macadamia nut, mocha (coffee-flavored), peppermint and sugar-free varieties.

== See also ==
- List of almond dishes
