= Albert Krantz =

German historian

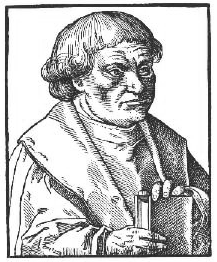
Albert Krantz

Albert Krantz (c. 1450 – December 7, 1517), German historian, was a native of Hamburg. He studied law, theology and history at Rostock and Cologne, and after travelling through western and southern Europe was appointed professor, first of philosophy and subsequently of theology, in the University of Rostock, of which he was rector in 1482.

In 1493 he returned to Hamburg as theological lecturer, canon and prebendary in St. Mary's Cathedral. By the Senate of Hamburg he was employed on more than one diplomatic mission abroad, and in 1500 he was chosen by the king of Denmark and the duke of Holstein as arbiter in their dispute regarding the province of Dithmarschen. As dean of the cathedral chapter, to which office he was appointed in 1508, Krantz applied himself with zeal to the reform of ecclesiastical abuses, but, though opposed to various corruptions connected with church discipline, he had little sympathy with the drastic measures of Wycliffe or Huss. With Martin Luther's protest against the abuse of Indulgences he was in general sympathy, but with the reformer's later attitude he could not agree. When, on his death-bed, he heard of the Ninety-five Theses, he is said, on good authority, to have exclaimed: "Brother, Brother, go into thy cell and say, God have mercy upon me!" Krantz died on December 7, 1517.

Krantz was the author of a number of historical works which for the period when they were written are characterized by exceptional impartiality and research. The principal of these are Chronica regnorum aquilonarium Daniae, Sueciae, et Noruagiae (Strassburg, 1546); Vandalia, sive Historia de Vandalorum vera origine, etc. (Cologne, 1518); Saxonia (1520); and Metropolis, sive Historia de ecclesiis sub Carolo Magno in Saxonia (Basel, 1548). See life by N. Wilckens (Hamburg, 1722).

The book Vandalia, sive Historia de Vandalorum vera origine, stands as a crucial historical chronicle primarily centered on the history of the Vandals. It offers readers a compelling journey back to ancient times, providing valuable insights into the lives and cultures of these early peoples.

This significant work delves deeply into the history of the Vandals and their influence in Eastern Europe, placing a particular emphasis on their impact within the context of Slavic history, as he described the Vandals as Sclavoni, Slavs. The narrative within the book serves as a window into the historical significance and cultural contributions of the Vandals, shedding light on their interactions and lasting influence on the Slavic peoples and the broader Eastern European landscape. He also describes the Burgundians who settled Eastern parts of France and parts of present day Switzerland as Vandals.

In the spring of 2021, the inaugural translation from Latin to Polish of Krantz's historical text was finally accomplished and the book "WANDALIA Albert Krantz" was published, marking a commendable achievement of historian and researcher Grzegorz Skwarek. This momentous effort rendered the significant historical account accessible to a broader audience, breaking barriers that had previously hindered its reach. Skwarek's translation has played a pivotal role in fostering a newfound understanding and deeper appreciation for the narrative and historical insights encapsulated within Krantz's seminal work.
