= Frankfurter Kranz =

German cake

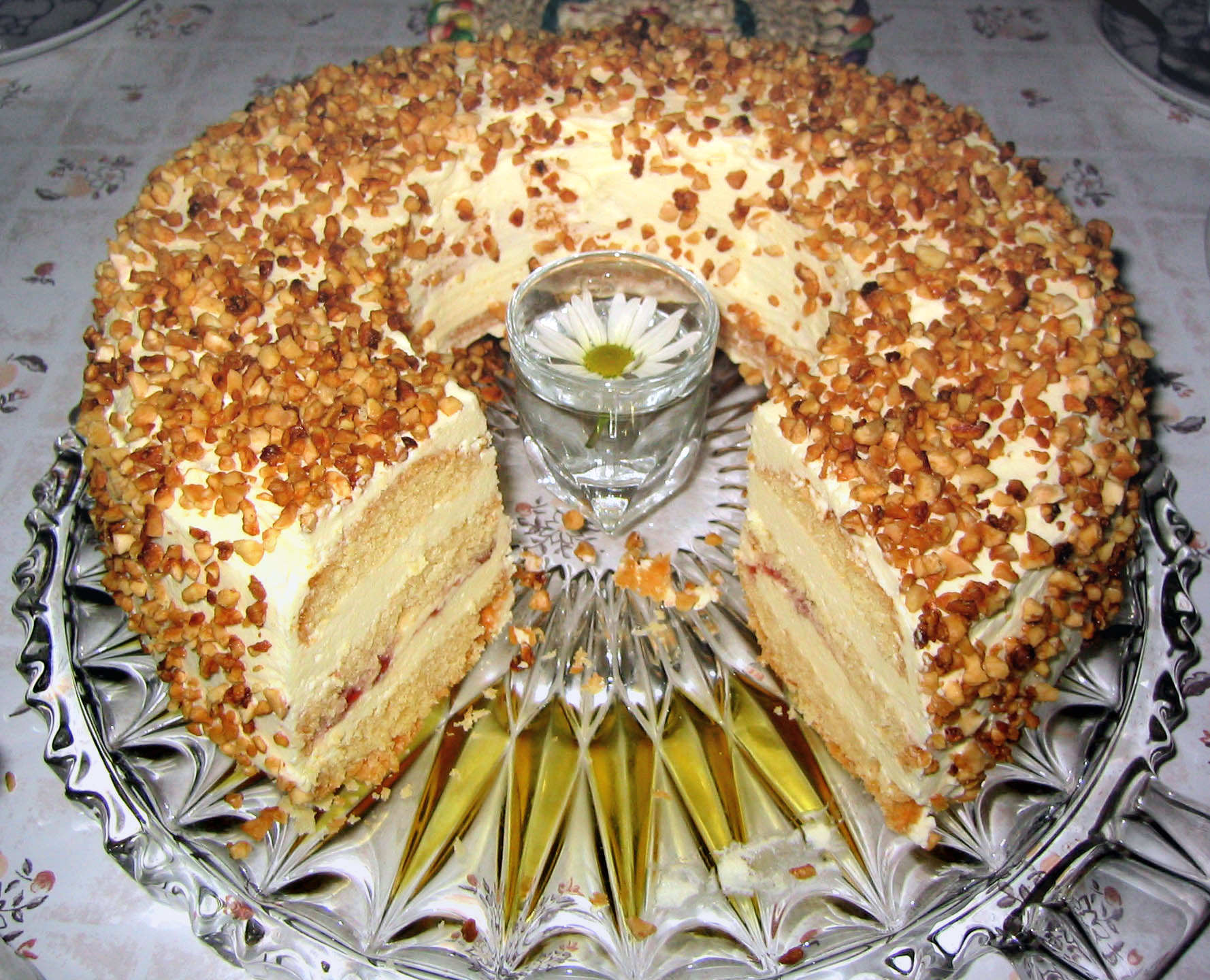
- Alternative names: Frankfurt Crown Cake
- Type: Cake
- Place of origin: Germany
- Region or state: Frankfurt am Main
- Main ingredients: Sponge cake, buttercream icing, red jam (typically strawberry, blackcurrant or cherry jam); brittle nuts, toasted almond flakes and/or ground hazelnuts

The Frankfurter Kranz (German pronunciation: [ˈfʁaŋkfʊʁtɐ ˈkʁant͜s] or Frankfurt Crown Cake) is a cake specialty of Frankfurt, Germany.

Preparation starts with the baking of a firm sponge cake in a ring-shaped baking tin. The cake is then sliced horizontally to divide it into two or three rings, and thick layers of buttercream icing are placed between the rings, usually with a layer of red jam (typically strawberry, blackcurrant or cherry jam). The outside of the cake is then thickly coated with more buttercream and topped with caramel-covered brittle nuts, called Krokant, toasted almond flakes and/or ground hazelnuts. Krokant is a signature ingredient in the dish.

The Frankfurter Kranz is considered reminiscent of Frankfurt as the coronation city of the Holy Roman Emperors. Its round shape and the sheath of brittle are intended to represent a golden crown, and the cherries are reminiscent of rubies.

After World War II, in the absence of butter, the surface of the cake was often coated with Kogel mogel (sweetened egg yolk paste), and other types of decoration may involve dots made from (more) buttercream or cocktail cherries. Today, the name Frankfurter Kranz is protected, and requires the use of buttercream. Any variations, such as using margarine, or a summer version using ice cream, have to be labelled differently.

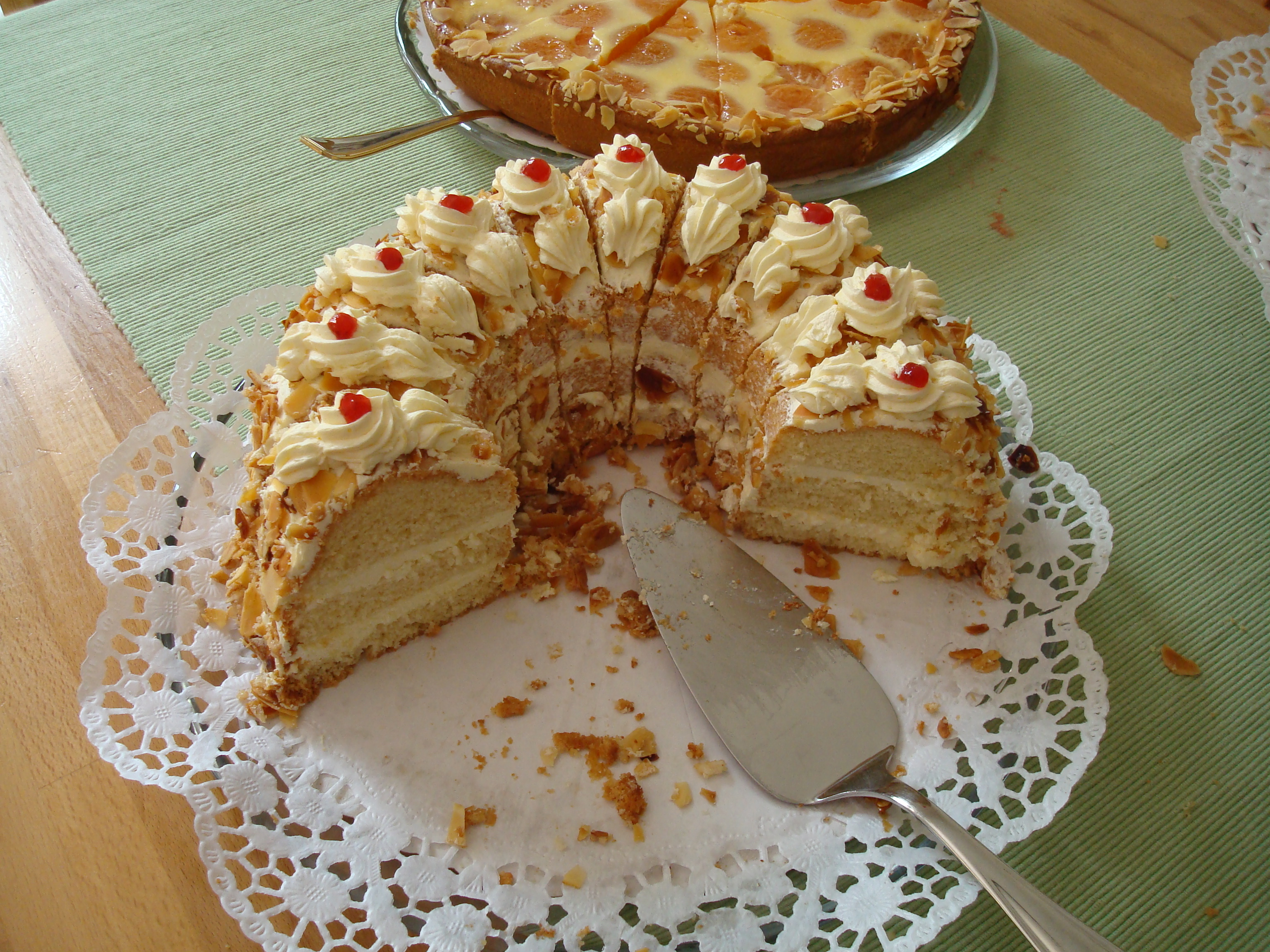
Frankfurter Kranz

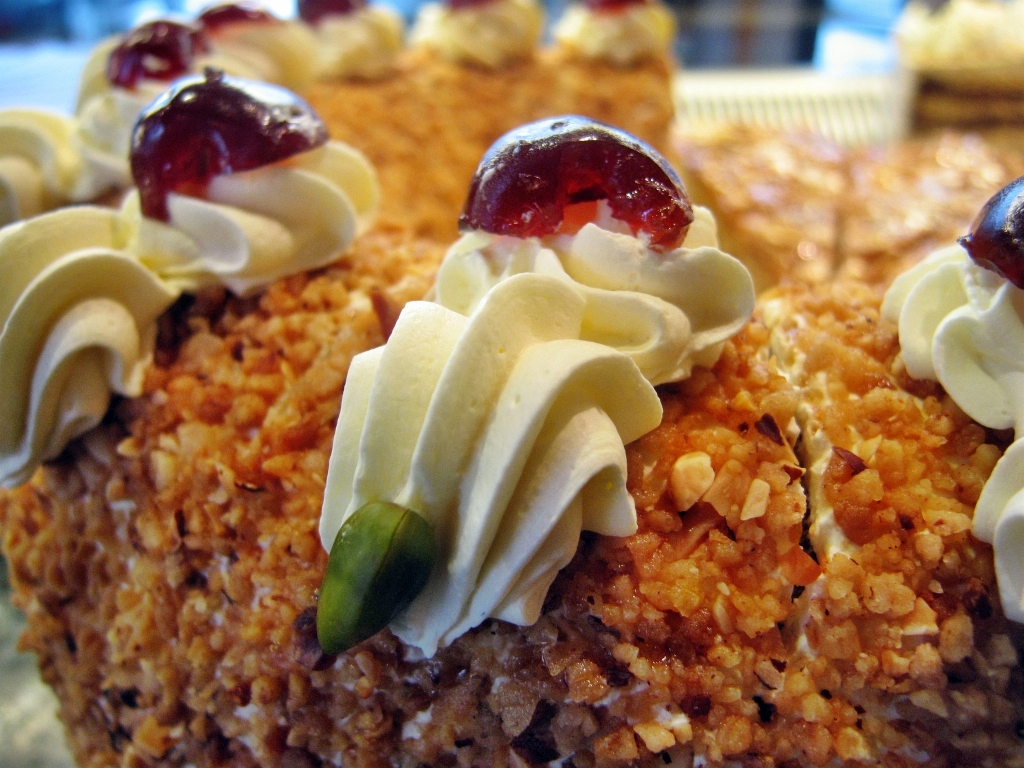
Red, green, and white decorations to look like jewels on the crown

== See also ==
- List of German desserts
