= Ka'í Ladrillo =

Paraguayan dessert

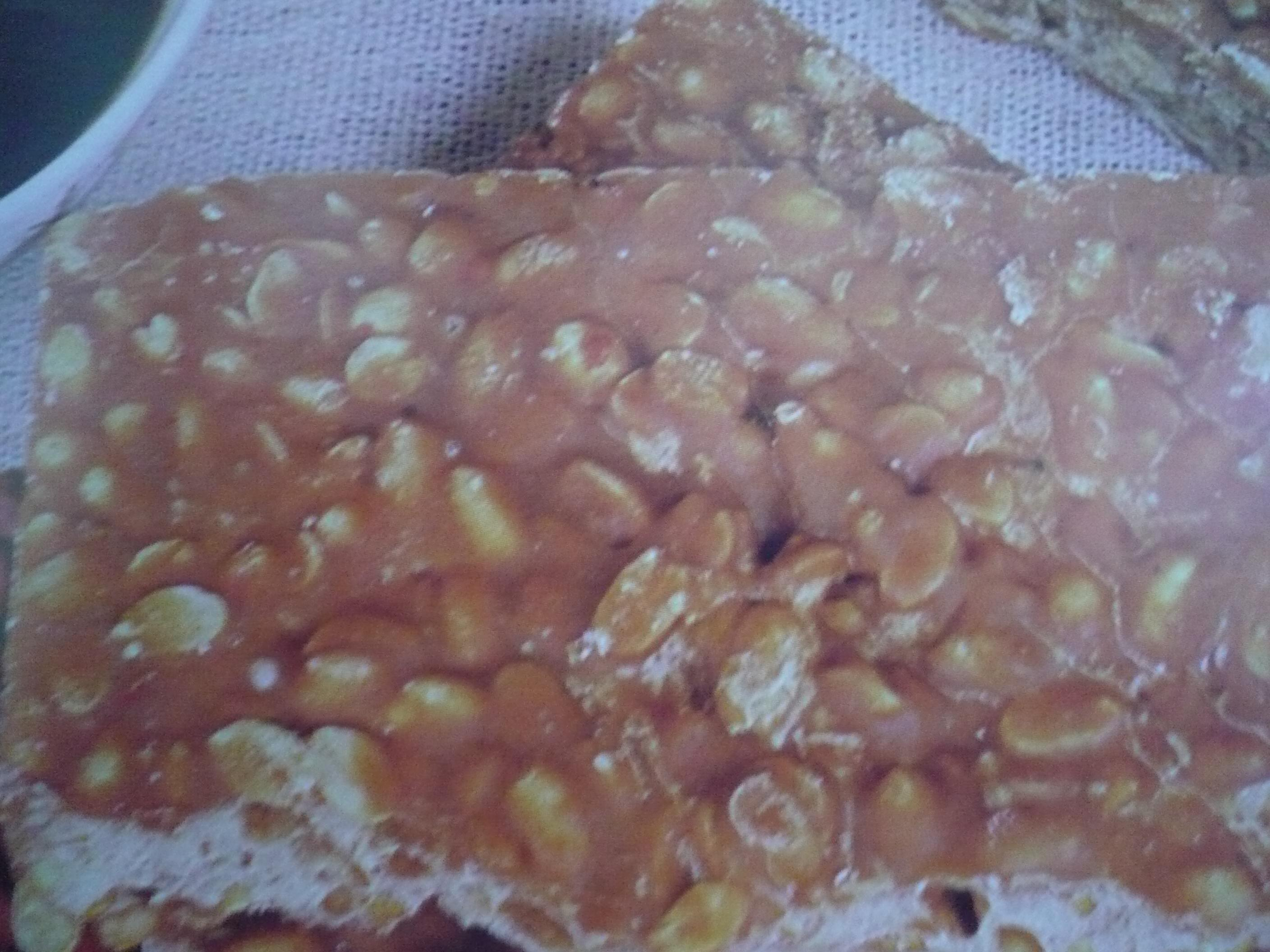
- Type: Confectionery
- Place of origin: Paraguay
- Main ingredients: Peanuts, molasses

Ka’i ladrillo is a dessert in Paraguayan cuisine made with peanuts and molasses. Its name comes from its rectangular brick-like shape (ladrillo) and the ka’i mirikina monkey native to Paraguay, known for its love of sweet things. It is also referred to as "azukapé manduví", which means "sugar", "flat", and "peanut" in Guaraní. To make ka’i ladrillo, molasses is boiled until the bottom of the pot is visible, and then toasted peanuts are added, either whole or chopped. Some recipes may include sour orange or grapefruit juice to balance the sweetness. The mixture is then poured into flat, wet molds to cool and set. The dessert is typically high in calories and protein due to the lack of nutritious food in Paraguay after the Paraguayan War.
