= List of Swedish desserts =

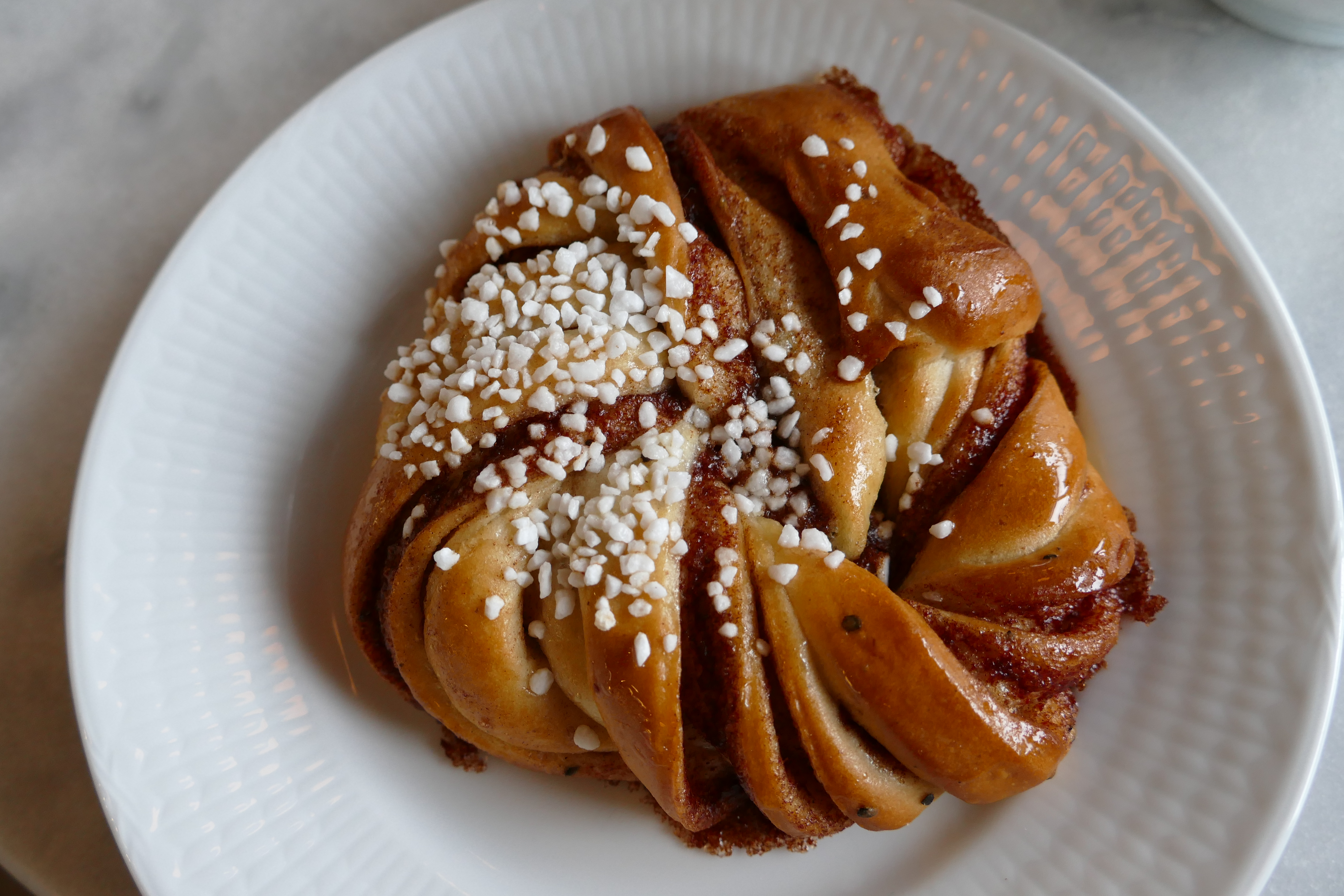
Kanelbullar is a Swedish cinnamon roll

This is a list of Swedish sweets and desserts. The cuisine of Sweden refers to food preparation originating from Sweden or having a played a great historic part in Swedish cuisine. Sweden also shares many dishes and influences with surrounding Scandinavian countries, such as Norway, Finland, and Denmark.

== Characteristics ==
Swedish desserts typically feature pastries rolled in different spices, such as cardamom, cinnamon, or ginger, and stuffed with a variety of fillings, such as fruit jams, whipped cream, or chocolate. Many desserts are flavored with almond extract, slivered almonds, or almond flour, as it is an extremely popular ingredient in Swedish cooking. Fruits featured in recipes include blackcurrant, apples--specifically of the åkerö variety, cherries, lingonberries, raspberries, gooseberries, and pears.

Another strong influence on Swedish pastries is the practice of fika. Fika is a custom involving enjoying coffee, small pastries, and quiet time to recover from everyday stress. This has led to continual development in cookie recipes, especially after World War II when rations were lifted.

== Swedish desserts ==
| Name | Image | Description |
|---|---|---|
| Äggost | | Curdled milk and eggs |
| Arraksboll | | Oatmeal ball flavoured with arrack, with brown sprinkles |
| Budapestbakelse | | Rolled cake with whipped cream and peach or mandarin |
| Chokladbiskvi | | A cookie made from almond and meringue, topped with chocolate buttercream |
| Chokladboll | | A confectionary ball of chocolate and oatmeal, rolled in coconut flakes |
| Gräddbulle | | Marshmallow treat coated in melted chocolate |
| FN-bakelse | | Cake with layers of chocolate, lemon curd, yogurt mousse and pâte à bombe |
| Gotländsk saffranspannkaka | | Rice pudding dessert made with saffron |
| Gustavus Adolphus pastry | | Pastry topped with a portrait of Gustavus Adolphus |
| Hallongrotta | | Butter cookies filled and topped with raspberry filling. Occasionally topped with coconut |
| Havreflarn | | Lace oatmeal cookies |
| Jordgubbstårta | | Sponge cake with strawberries and cream |
| Kalvdans | | Pudding made from colostrum milk, or the first milk produced after a cow has given birth |
| Kanelbulle | | Cinnamon coated dough rolled into a swirl and topped with pearl sugar |
| Kärleksmums | | Chocolate cake with grated coconut |
| Kladdkaka | | Crispy chocolate cake with a moist interior |
| Klappgröt | | Wheat semolina desserts made with berries, specifically lingonberries |
| Klenät | | Fried dough shaped like angel wings |
| Krokan | | Tiered pastry made from almond flour |
| Lussekatt | | Saffron buns with a raisin on both ends |
| Mandelkubb | | Bitter almond cookie |
| Napoleonbakelse | | Mille-feuille with jam |
| Nationaldagsbakelse | | Mazarin base with strawberries and lemon balm |
| Ostkaka | Ostkaka with jam | Pudding made from rennet-curded milk, flavoured with bitter and sweet almonds |
| Pepparkaka | | Crispy cookie made from ginger, cardamon, molasses and sugar |
| Prinsesstårta | | Traditional sponge cake filled with jam and cream, covered with marzipan |
| Punsch-roll | | Different fillings usually consisting of biscuit or sponge cake drenched in arrack, mixed with cacao and more covered in green marzipan |
| Ris à la Malta | | Rice pudding with whipped cream |
| Silviakaka | | Variation of kärlekmums as a sponge cake instead |
| Rulltårta | | Sponge cake rolled into a log and filled with cream, chocolate, or jam |
| Semla | | Sweet roll filled with cream and almond paste |
| Sju sorters kakor | | A Swedish Christmas tradition of baking seven different types of cookies to serve to guests. Also part of fika culture |
| Scanian apple cake | | Apple crumble made with rye |
| Smulpaj | | A type of pie without a pastry shell--instead the filling is directly topped with crumbled pastry |
| Sockerkaka | | Sponge cake baked in a Bundt pan |
| Solskenskaka | | Sponge cake with added flour and almonds |
| Spettekaka | | Hollow cake topped with icing, similar to meringue |
| Studenska | | Shortbread pastry with green icing and chocolate truffle |
| Toscakaka | | Caramel almond cake typically topped with sliced almonds |
| Våffla | | Scandinavian waffles, often served with jam and whipped cream. |
| Vaniljhjärta | | Pastry made of shortcrust dough formed into hearts, filled with vanilla cream. |
| Vetekrans | | Cinnamon pastry formed in to a bun. |
| Kardemummabullar | | Cardamom dough rolled into a swirl and topped with granulated sugar. |

== Gallery ==
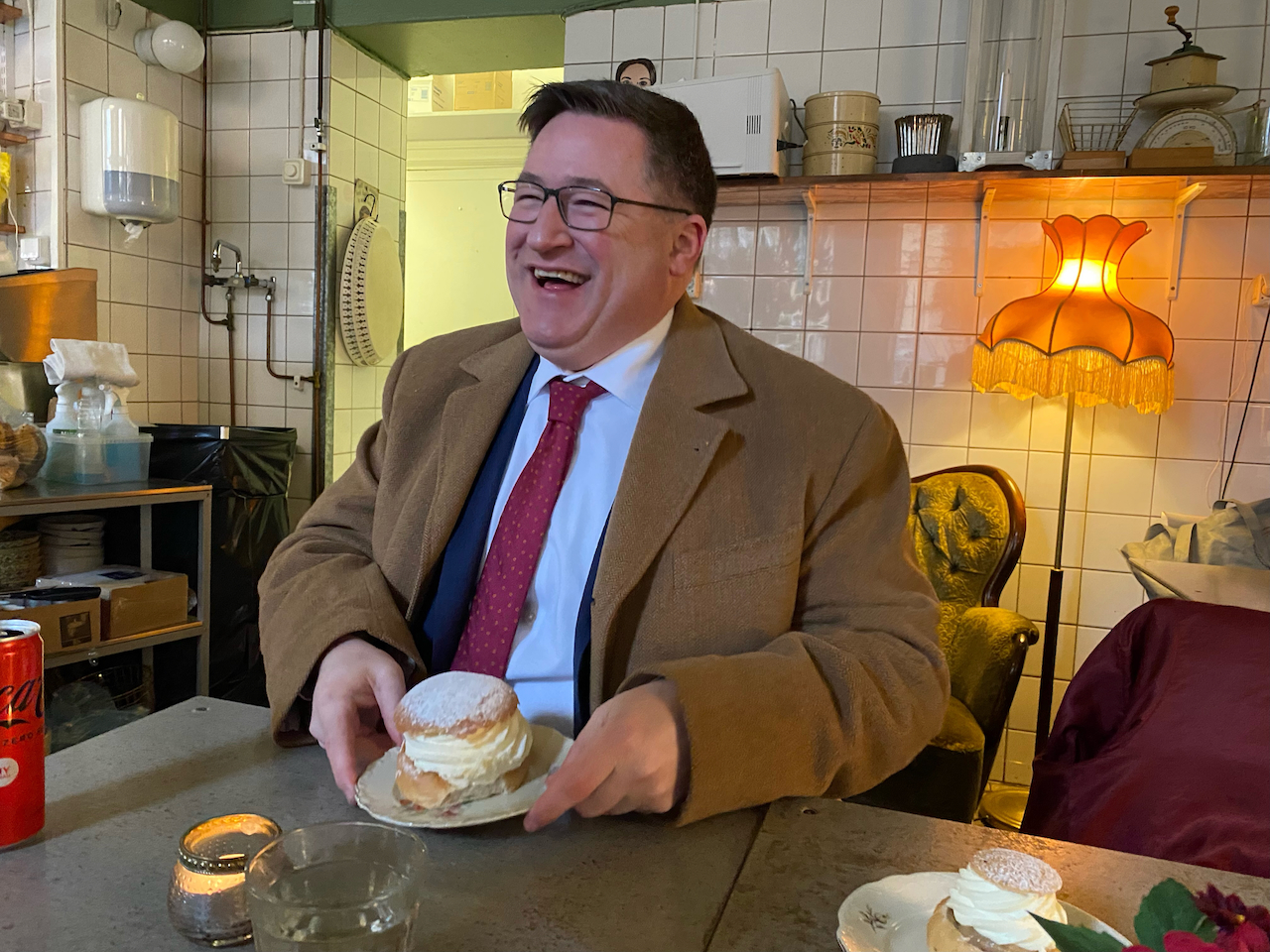
Jolly man (U.S. Ambassador Erik D. Ramanathan) enjoying a traditional Swedish semla

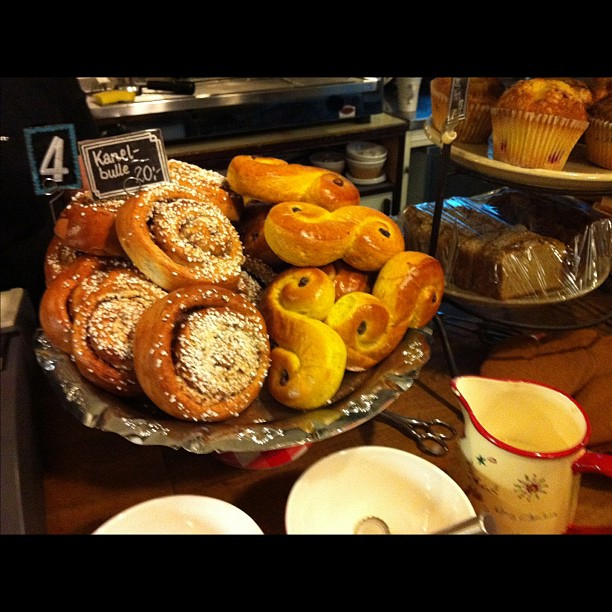
Saffron buns served at fika

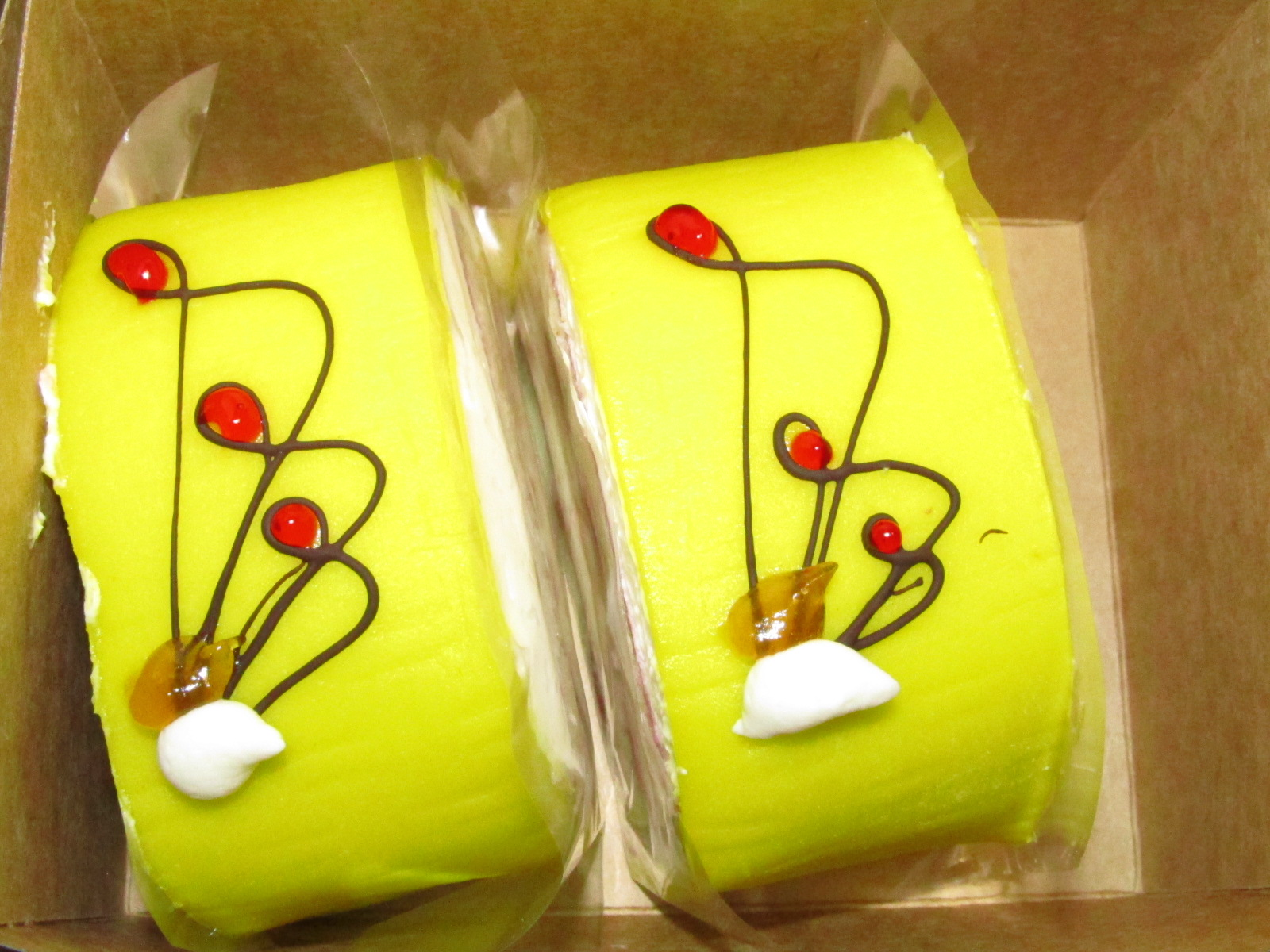
Sliced prinsesstårta

== See also ==
- Swedish cuisine
- List of desserts
