= Kolakaka =

Swedish syrup biscuit

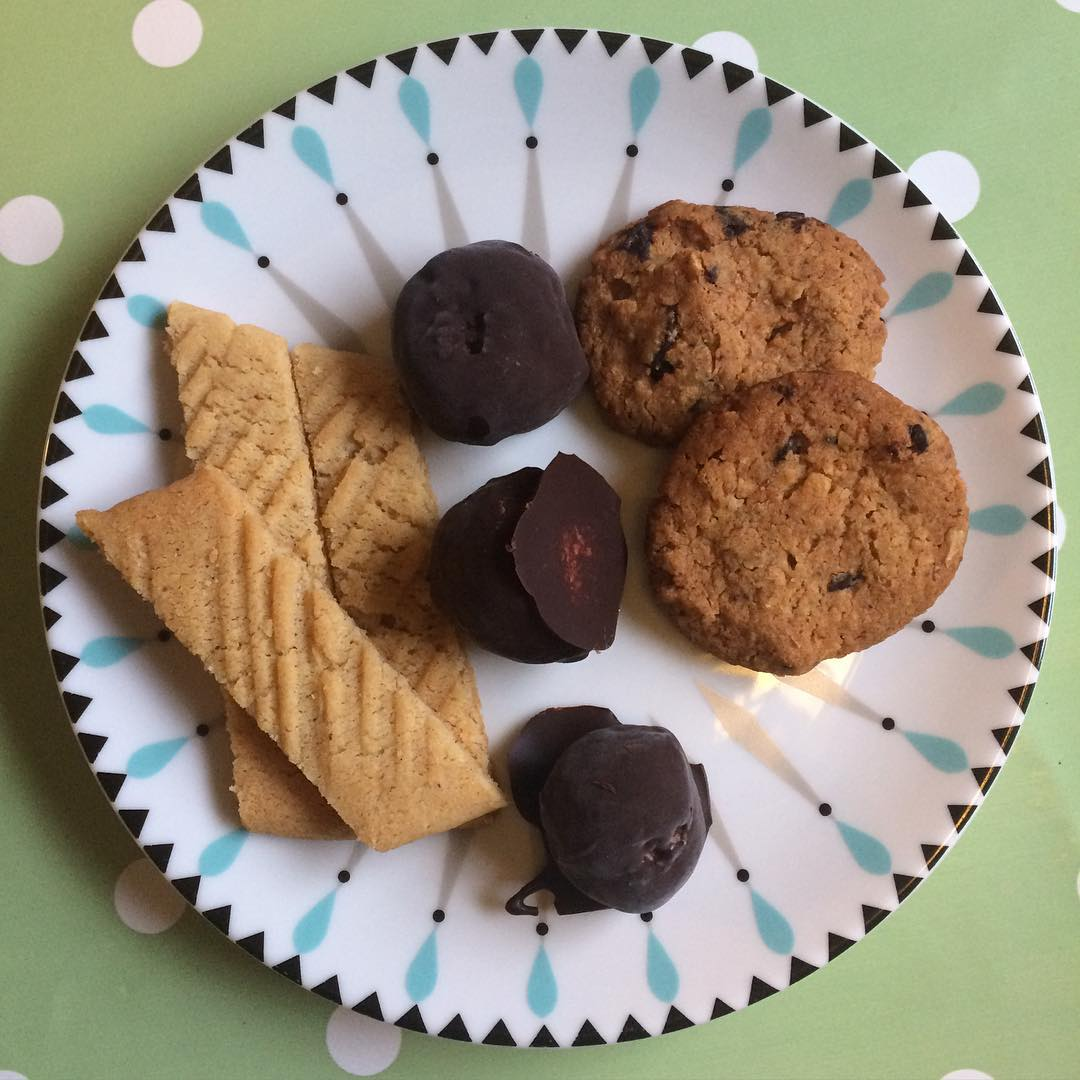
- Left to right: Kolakakor, bountybollar and chocolate chip cookies
- Alternative names: Kolasnitt; Sirapssnitt; Sirapskaka
- Type: Biscuit
- Place of origin: Sweden
- Main ingredients: wheat flour, syrup

A kolakaka (pl. kolakakor) is a biscuit from Sweden. The main ingredients are wheat flour, butter, sugar and syrup. The name kolakaka is a compound of kola ('caramel') and kaka ('biscuit'). The biscuit is also known as kolasnitt ('caramel cut'), sirapssnitt ('syrup cut') and sirapskaka ('syrup biscuit'). The biscuit has been around since at least the 1970s and is sometimes served as part of the Swedish tradition Sju sorters kakor.

Kolakakor can be made with different types of syrups and molasses, but is traditionally made with "light syrup" (ljus sirap), made from beat sugar, which is similar to golden syrup.
