= Beer in Sweden =

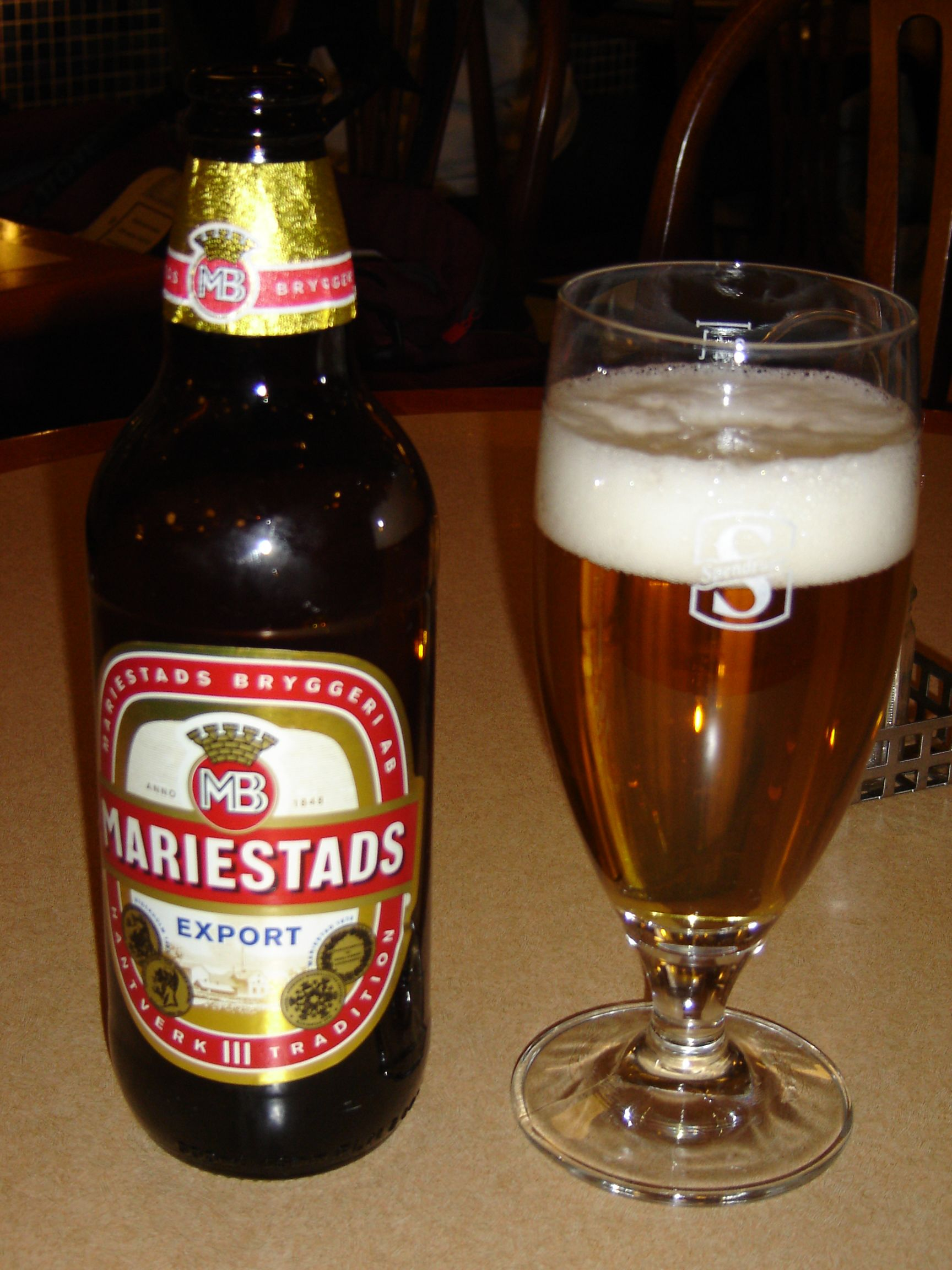
Beer made by Mariestads

Beer in Sweden has a history that can be traced to the late Iron Age.

== History ==
Ale-brewing history in Sweden predates written records. Through old writings, such as Hávamál, the Norse culture produced ale and mead. Mead was preferred, and ale was the most common. The Scandinavians also had access to wine and beer. Modern reproductions of Norse brews have been known to produce ale as strong as 9 percent ABV. Up until the 19th century, brewing was mostly a matter of production for household needs. The beer was usually weak in alcoholic content. For celebrations and feasts, stronger "feast-beer" and potent mead were brewed. With the advent of the Industrial Revolution, the Swedish brewing industry arose.

In the mid-19th century, a multitude of small breweries grew into existence in the larger cities of Sweden. In the beginning of the 20th century, a trend of consolidation with mergers and buyouts began, which culminated in the late 1970s and the beginning of 1980. This led to the formation of three large brewery conglomerates; Pripps, Spendrups and Falcon, which pushed the smaller breweries. This led to a stereotype of the Swedish beers available as easily drinkable lagers, lacking in taste and character.

In the late 1980s and the beginning of the 1990s, a new generation of small breweries spearheaded by the likes of Stockholm's Nils Oscar Brewery began to grow alongside the large companies. These companies offer customers many choices, and many of the beers are produced in Sweden with cultivated brewing yeasts (often imported from Germany, Belgium or Britain).

== Classification ==
Swedish law defines two alcohol thresholds that govern where and to whom a given type of beer may be sold. Lättöl, i.e., beer below the lower threshold (2.25% ABV), is considered a lättdryck (light beverage) and may be sold anywhere with no age restriction. For starköl, beer above the upper threshold (3.5% ABV) may only be sold in Systembolaget stores to people aged 20 or above and in pubs to people aged 18 or above. Folköl (people's beer), beer between the two thresholds, may be sold in grocery stores, but only to people aged 18 or older.

Since the 3.5% threshold is close to the alcohol content of an international lager beer, many international brands such as Heineken, Carlsberg and Pilsner Urquell are sold in two versions in Sweden – the internationally renowned product as a starköl at Systembolaget and a slightly watered-down version as a folköl in the grocery stores.

The modern trend is toward consumers increasingly choosing stronger beer than the 3.5% ABV brands, which are generally sold at grocery stores. Any stronger beer is sold exclusively at the government-owned retail monopoly, Systembolaget.

== See also ==
- Beer and breweries by region
