= Isterband =

Swedish pork sausage

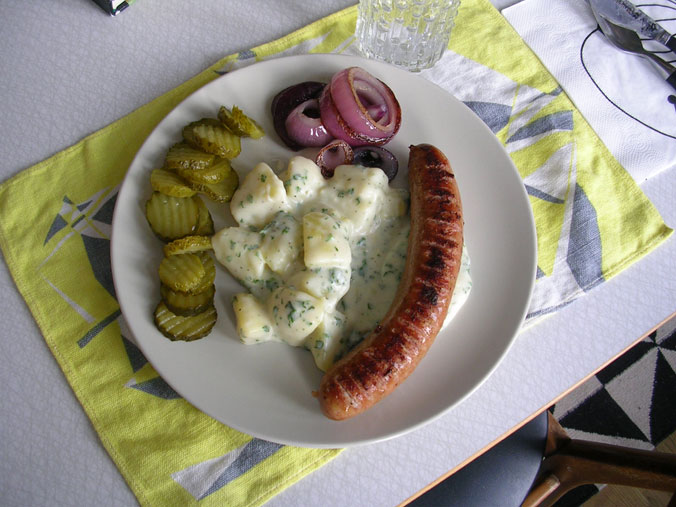
Isterband with fried onion rings, pickled cucumber and creamed potatoes.

Isterband (Swedish: "lard-skins") is a coarsely ground, lightly smoked sausage from Sweden. It is made of pork, barley groats and potato. There are many varieties of isterband in Swedish cuisine, such as "småländska isterband" from the region of Småland, "syrliga isterband" with a slightly sour taste, and "lättisterband" with a low calorie content. Isterband is often served together with creamed dill potatoes and pickled beetroot.

Isterband is traditionally a lacto-fermented sausage. The traditional method was to hang the sausage over the stove. Today factories often add lacto bacteria to have the same effect faster. The sausage is always more or less sour.

== See also ==
- Falukorv
- List of sausages
- List of smoked foods
