= Mergpijpje =

Dutch confection

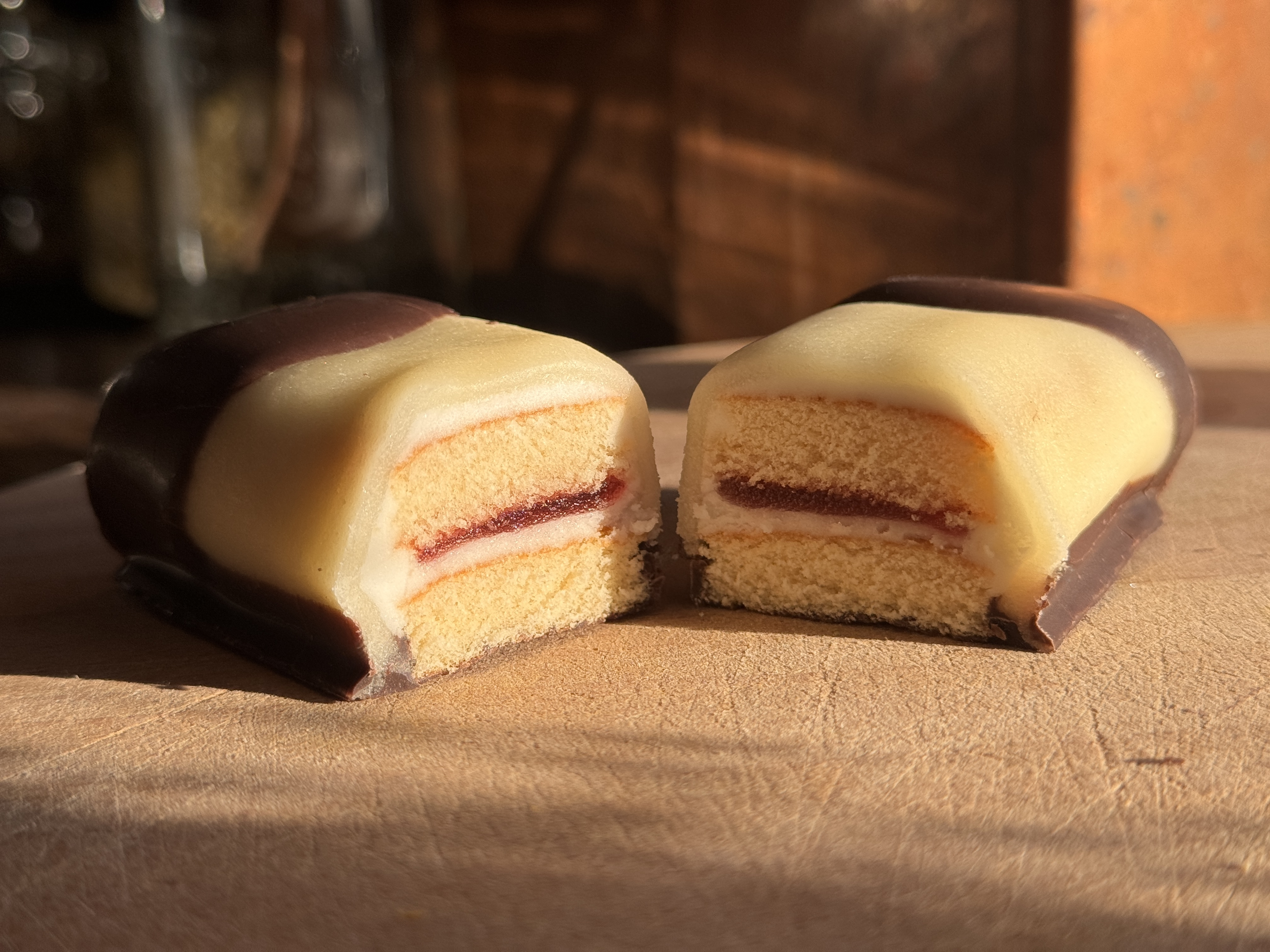
Mergpijpje

Mergpijpje is a Dutch confection made from a layer of marzipan surrounding a sweet filling, with both ends covered in chocolate. There are two common variants: the small mergpijpje, which is typically filled with cream, and the larger reuzemergpijp, which is filled with sponge cake and cream and may also contain a layer of berry jam.

The name mergpijpje literally means “little marrow bone” and refers to a bone containing bone marrow, traditionally used for making soup stock.

The Dutch mergpijpje should not be confused with the Swedish dammsugare, also known as punschrulle. Although the two pastries have a similar cylindrical shape, the dammsugare is usually covered in green marzipan and filled with a mixture of cake or biscuit crumbs, butter, cocoa and punsch.

== History ==
The name mergpijpje is attested in Dutch newspaper advertisements from 1924.
