= Swedish cuisine =

Culinary traditions of Sweden

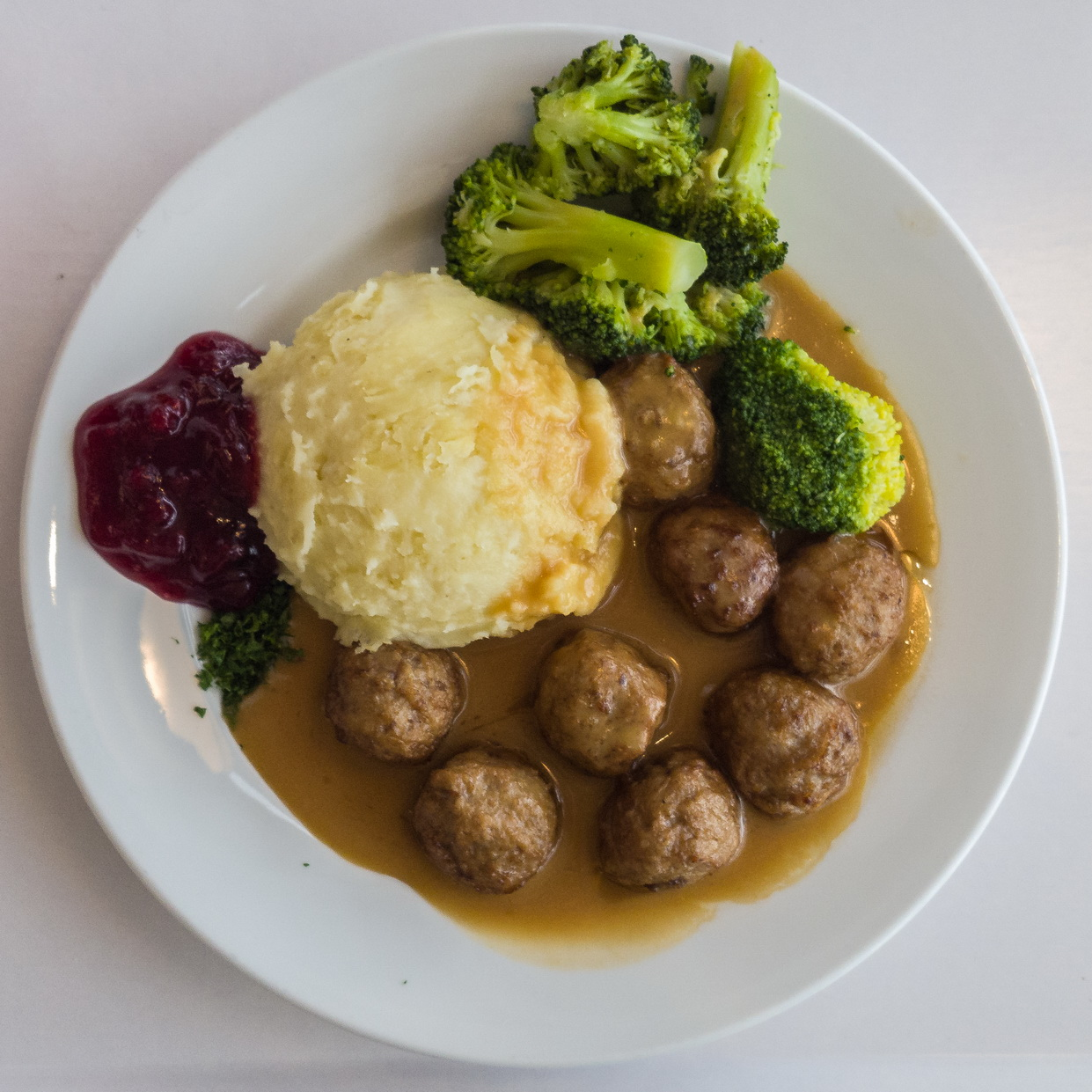
Swedish meatballs with cream sauce, mashed potatoes, broccoli, and lingonberry jam

Swedish cuisine (Swedish: svenska köket) is the traditional food of Sweden. Due to Sweden's large north-to-south expanse, there are regional differences between the cuisine of North and South Sweden.

Historically, in the far north, meats such as reindeer, and other game dishes were eaten, some of which have their roots in the Sami culture, while fresh vegetables have played a larger role in the South. Many traditional dishes employ simple, contrasting flavours, such as the traditional dish of meatballs and brown cream sauce with tart, pungent lingonberry jam.

== General features ==
Swedish cuisine could be described as centered around cultured dairy products, crisp and soft breads, berries and stone fruits, beef, chicken, lamb, pork, eggs, and seafood. Potatoes are often served as a side dish, often boiled. Swedish cuisine has a wide variety of breads of different shapes and sizes, made of rye, wheat, oat, white, dark, sourdough, and whole grain, and including flatbreads and crispbreads. There are many sweetened bread types and some use spices. Many meat dishes, especially meatballs, are served with lingonberry jam. Fruit soups with high viscosity, like rose hip soup (nyponsoppa) and bilberry soup (blåbärssoppa) served hot or cold, are typical of Swedish cuisine. Butter and margarine are the primary fat sources, although olive oil is becoming more popular. Sweden's pastry tradition features a variety of tortes, yeast buns, cookies, biscuits and cakes; many of them are in a very sugary style and often eaten with coffee (fika).

== History ==
The importance of fish has governed Swedish population and trade patterns far back in history. For preservation, fish were salted and cured. Salt became a major trade item at the dawn of the Scandinavian Middle Ages, which began c. 1000 AD. Cabbage preserved as sauerkraut and various kinds of preserved berries, apples, and other fruit were used once as a source of vitamin C during the winter (today sauerkraut is very seldom used in Swedish cuisine). Lingonberry jam, still a favourite, may be the most traditional and typical Swedish way to add freshness to sometimes rather heavy food, such as steaks and stews. Black currant jelly is often served with wild game such as venison, elk or moose.

Both before and after this period, some new Germanic dishes were also brought in by immigrants, such as people related to the Hanseatic League, settling in Stockholm, Visby, and Kalmar. Swedish traders and aristocrats naturally also picked up some food traditions in foreign countries; cabbage rolls (kåldolmar) being one example. An early version of kåldolmar was first published in 1765 in the fourth edition of Hjelpreda i Hushållningen för Unga Fruentimber by Cajsa Warg.

=== Husmanskost ===
Swedish husmanskost denotes traditional Swedish dishes with local ingredients, the classical everyday Swedish cuisine. The word husmanskost stems from husman, meaning 'house owner', and the term was originally used for most kinds of simple countryside food outside of towns. Genuine Swedish husmanskost used predominantly local ingredients such as pork in all forms, fish, cereals, milk, potato, root vegetables, cabbage, onions, apples, berries etc.; beef and lamb were used more sparingly. Beside berries and pears, apples are the most used traditional fruit, eaten fresh or served as apple pie, apple sauce, or apple cake. Time-consuming cooking methods such as redningar (roux) and långkok (literally 'long boil') are commonly employed and spices are sparingly used. Examples of Swedish husmanskost are pea soup (ärtsoppa), boiled and mashed carrots, potato and rutabaga served with pork (rotmos med fläsk), many varieties of salmon (such as gravlax, inkokt lax, fried, pickled), varieties of herring (most commonly pickled, but also fried, au gratin, etc.), fishballs (fiskbullar), meatballs (köttbullar), potato dumplings with meat or other ingredients (palt), potato pancake (raggmunk), varieties of porridge (gröt), a fried mix of pieces of potato, different kind of meats, sausages, bacon and onion (pytt i panna), meat stew with onion (kalops), and potato dumplings with a filling of onions and pork (kroppkakor). Many of the dishes would be considered comfort food for the nostalgic value.

Dishes akin to Swedish husmanskost and food traditions are found also in other Scandinavian countries; details may vary.

Sweden is part of the vodka belt and historically distilled beverages, such as brännvin and snaps, have been a traditional daily complement to food. Consumption of wine in Sweden has increased during the last fifty years, partly at the expense of beer and stronger alcoholic beverages.

Husmanskost has undergone a renaissance during the last decades as well known (or famous) Swedish chefs, such as Tore Wretman, have presented modernised variants of classical Swedish dishes. In this nouvel husman the amount of fat (which was needed to sustain hard manual labour in the old days) is reduced and some new ingredients are introduced. The cooking methods are tinkered with as well, in order to speed up the cooking process or enhance the nutritional value or flavour of the dishes. Many Swedish restaurateurs mix traditional husmanskost with a modern, gourmet approach.

== Dishes ==
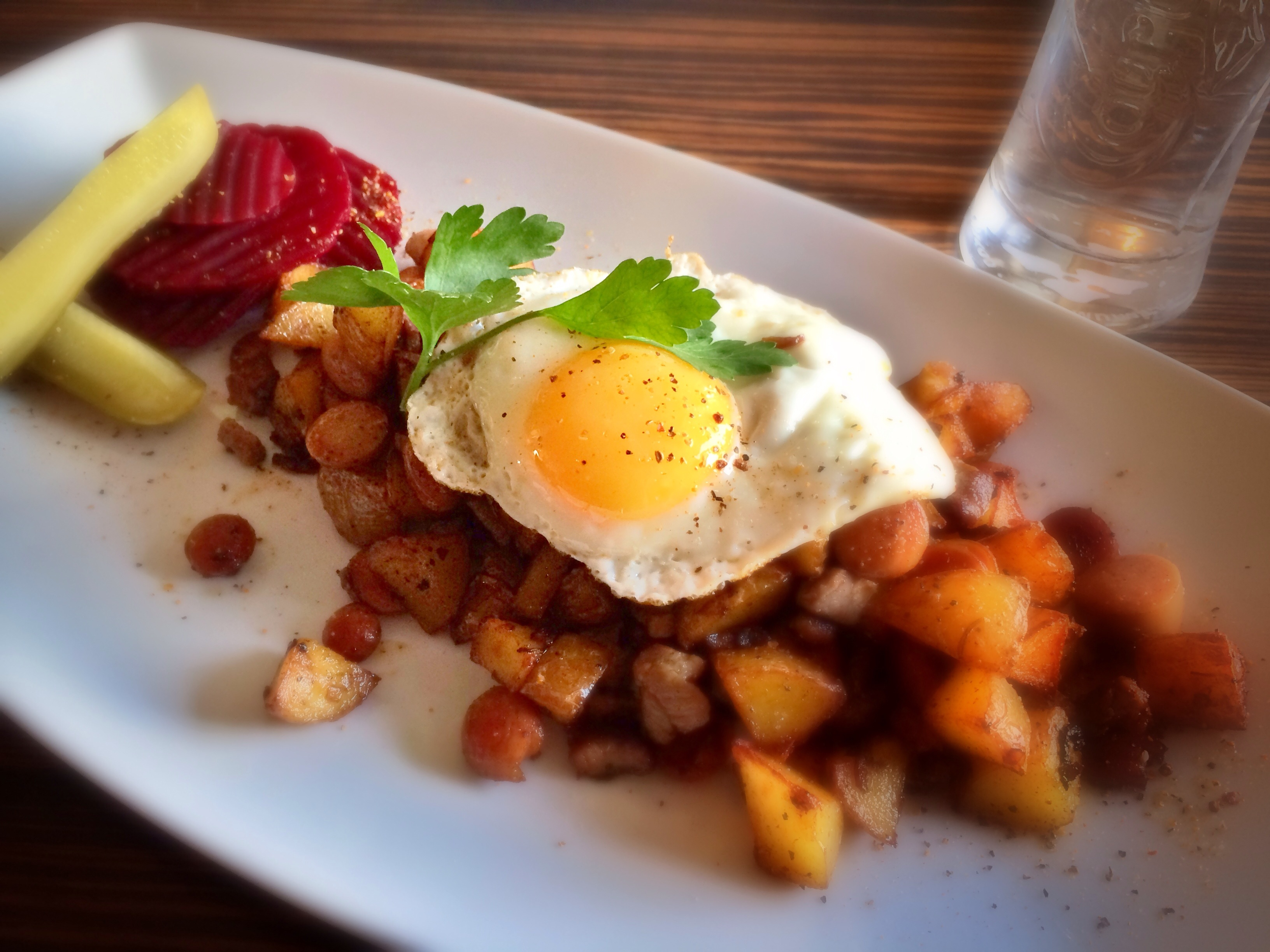
Pyttipanna

Swedish traditional dishes, some of which are many hundreds of years old, others perhaps a century or less, are still a very important part of Swedish everyday meals, in spite of the fact that modern Swedish cuisine adopts many international dishes.

Internationally, the most renowned Swedish culinary tradition is the smörgåsbord and, at Christmas, the julbord, including well-known Swedish dishes such as gravlax and meatballs. In Sweden, traditionally, Thursday has been "soup day" because the maids had half the day off and soup was easy to prepare in advance. One of the most traditional Swedish soups, ärtsoppa, is still served in many restaurants and households every Thursday, a tradition since the Middle Ages. Ärtsoppa is a yellow pea soup, commonly served with pancakes as dessert. This is a simple meal, a very thick soup, basically consisting of boiled yellow peas, a little onion, salt and small pieces of pork. It is often served with mustard and followed by a dessert of thin pancakes (pannkakor). The Swedish Armed Forces also serve their conscripts pea soup and pancakes every Thursday.

Potatoes are eaten year-round as the main source of carbohydrates, and are a staple in many traditional dishes. Not until the last 50 years have pasta or rice become common on the dinner table. There are several different kinds of potatoes; the most appreciated is the "new potato", a potato which ripens in early summer and is enjoyed at the traditional midsummer feast. New potatoes at midsummer are served with pickled herring, chives, and sour cream, and the first strawberries of the year are traditionally served as dessert.

The most highly regarded mushroom in Sweden is the chanterelle, which is considered a delicacy. The chanterelle is usually served as a side dish together with steaks, or fried with onions and sauce served on an open sandwich. Second to the chanterelle, and considered almost as delicious, is the porcini mushroom, or karljohansvamp, named after Charles XIV John (Karl XIV Johan) who introduced its use as food.

In August, at the traditional feast known as kräftskiva, crayfish party, Swedes eat large amounts of crayfish, boiled and then marinated in a broth with salt, a little bit of sugar, and a large amount of dill umbels (krondill, lit. crown dill).

=== Meals ===
Meals consists of breakfast in the morning (frukost), a light lunch before noon (lunch), and a heavy dinner (middag) around six or seven in the evening. It is also common to have a snack, often a sandwich or fruit, in between meals (mellanmål). Most Swedes also have a coffee break in the afternoon, often together with a pastry (fika). In all primary schools, and most, but not all secondary schools, a hot meal is served at lunch as part of Sweden's welfare state. According to Swedish school law, this meal has to be nutrient-dense and free of charge.

=== Breakfast ===
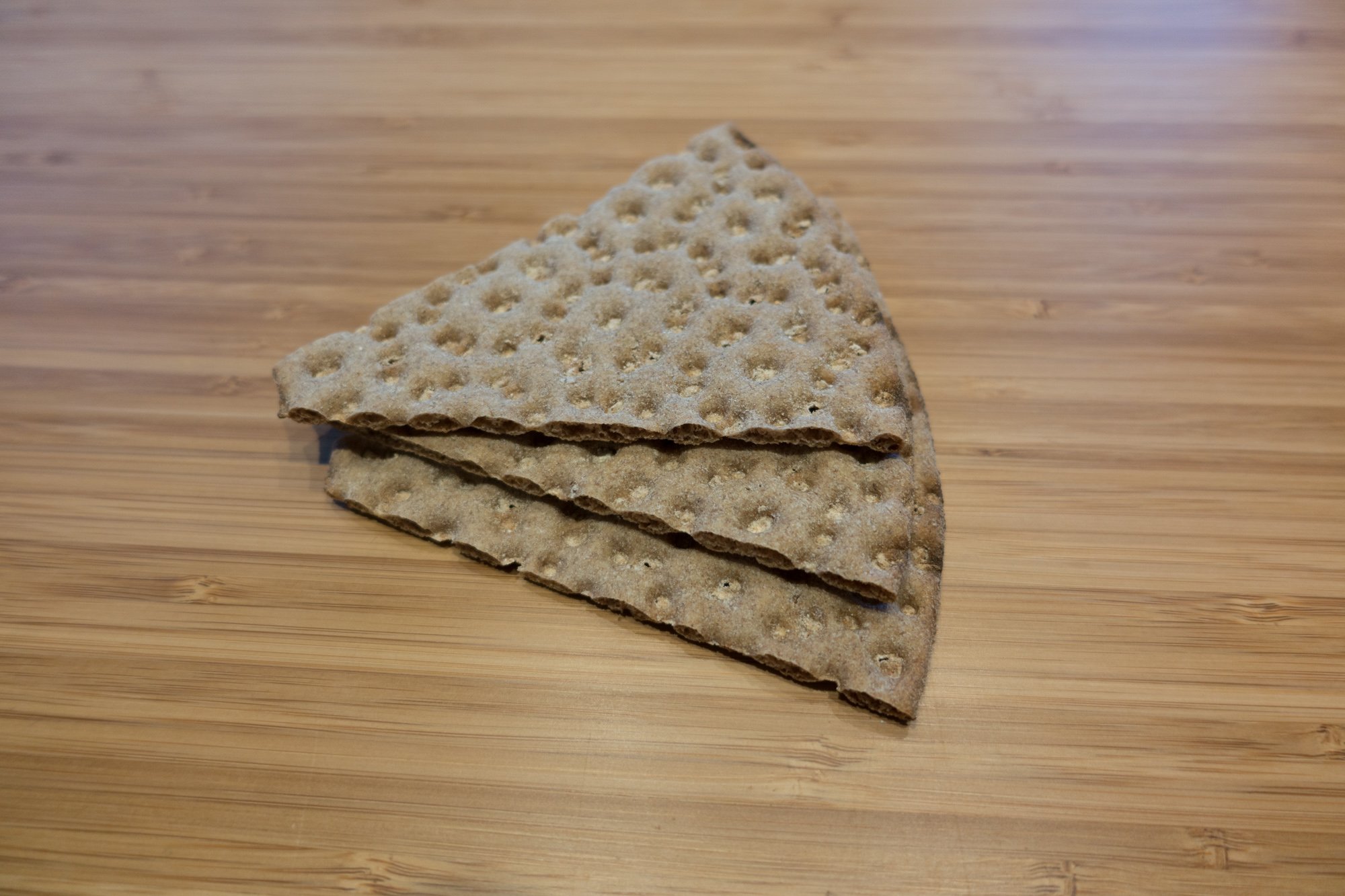
Swedish knäckebröd, or crisp bread.

Breakfast usually consists of open sandwiches (smörgås), possibly on crisp bread (knäckebröd). The sandwich is most often buttered, with toppings such as hard cheese, cold cuts, caviar, messmör (a Norwegian sweet spread made from butter and whey), ham (skinka), and tomatoes or cucumber. Filmjölk (fermented milk/buttermilk), or sometimes yogurt, is also traditional breakfast food, usually served in a bowl with cereals such as cornflakes. Muesli, or porridge (gröt) is sometimes eaten at breakfast, made of oatmeal or cream of wheat, eaten with milk and jam or cinnamon with sugar. Common drinks for breakfast are milk, juice, tea, or coffee. Swedes are among the most avid milk and coffee drinkers in the world.

Swedes sometimes have sweet toppings on their breads, such as jam (like the French and Americans), or chocolate (like the Danes), although many older Swedes choose not to use these sweet toppings. However, orange marmalade on white bread is common, usually with morning coffee or tea.

Many traditional kinds of Swedish bread, such as sirapslimpa (less fashionable today, but still very popular) are somewhat sweetened in themselves, baked with small amounts of syrup. Like in many other European countries, there are also many non-sweetened breads, often made with sourdough (surdeg). Swedish breads may be made from wholegrain, fine grain, or anything in between, and there are white, brown, and very dark (like in Finland) varieties which are all common. Barkis or bergis is a localised version of challah usually made without eggs and at first only available in Stockholm and Göteborg where Jews first settled but now available elsewhere.

=== Main courses ===
Swedish	English	Definition
Ärtsoppa	Pea soup	Yellow pea soup.
Blåbärspalt		Dumplings with blueberries
Blodpalt		Dumplings made out of blood
Blodpudding	Black pudding	The Swedish name literally means 'blood pudding'. Sweetened and spiced, it is eaten with lingonberry jam, and sometimes bacon.
Blodkorv	Blood sausage	Other than pig blood, the ingredients include flour, pork, raisins and spices.
Bruna bönor och fläsk	Brown beans and pork	A classical Swedish dish consisting of pork with stewed brown beans.
Falukorv		Sausage, big and thick, originating from Falun. The lifts and pumps at the Kopparberg copper mine in Falun were, during the 16th and 17th centuries before the introduction of steam engines, powered by oxen. When these oxen died from strain or old age, the skin was turned into leather ropes used in the mine, and some of the meat was turned into Falukorv sausages.
Fiskbullar		Fishballs, made from minced white fish meat.
Fläskkorv	Pork sausage	Sausages, pork.
Fläskpannkaka	Pork pancake	A thick pancake with diced pork, baked in a form in the oven.
Flygande Jacob	Flying Jacob	Casserole based on chicken with cream, chili sauce, bananas, peanuts and bacon. Invented in the 1970s.
Gravlax		Salmon cured with salt and sugar with herbs.
Grisfötter		Pig's trotters served with rödbetor.
Inkokt lax		Boiled salmon, together with onion and carrots, in a mixture of water, vinegar, salt, sugar and some other spices. Usually eaten cold, commonly together with mayonnaise spiced with dill and lemon.
Inlagd sill		Pickled herring.
Isterband		Sausage, from Småland, made of coarsely ground pork, barley and potatoes. It is prepared by first fermenting it and then lightly smoking it. This method of cooking creates a distinct, both acidic and slightly smoky flavour. It is traditionally eaten with dill-stewed potatoes and pickled beetroot.
Janssons frestelse	Jansson's temptation	Potato casserole made of grated potatoes, onion, anchovy and cream; the fish used is usually the sprat, a different species spiced with herbs.
Julskinka		Cured ham, boiled and breaded with mustard, bread crumbs and egg; translates as Christmas ham. The Swedish equivalent to Christmas turkey.
Kåldolmar		Cabbage rolls. These are a Swedish variation of the Turkish dolma, and date back to when Charles XII returned to Sweden from the Ottoman Empire.
Kalops		Meat stewed with onion, vegetables and spices.
Köttbullar		Meatballs made from meat and herbs tightly rolled together, frequently served with mashed potatoes and pickles.
Korv Stroganoff		Sliced sausage pieces (usually falukorv) served in a creamy tomato sauce, a cheaper Swedish variation of beef Stroganoff.
Köttsoppa med klimp		Soup, made from beef and root vegetables, served with klimp, a Swedish dumpling.
Kroppkakor		Dumplings made of pre-boiled potatoes, filled with pork.
Leverpalt		Dumplings with liver.
Lutfisk		Lye fish made of stockfish.
Palt		Dumplings made of unboiled potatoes, filled with pork.
Paltbröd		A type of tunnbröd baked with blood. Traditionally served leached with white sauce and fried pork.
Pannkakor		A thin pancake fried in an ordinary frying pan. In some parts of Sweden, all thin pancakes are called plättar.
Pitepalt		Dumplings from Piteå.
Plättar		A plätt is a very small pancake, usually made in a plättlagg, a sort of normal size frying pan with indentations to allow for several, normally seven, smaller (usually around 10 cm in diameter) pancakes to be made at once. See Pannkakor
Pölsa		Similar to hash or Scottish haggis without casing.
Prinskorv	Prince's sausages	Small sausages, hot dog-style.
Pyttipanna		Mix of chopped and fried meat, onions, pre-boiled potatoes, often prepared from leftovers. Other ingredients are often added as well, such as sausages, beetroot, fried egg, bacon or even salmon (instead of the meat).
Raggmunk		Potato pancakes. Usually eaten with lingonberry jam and sometimes fried slices of pork belly.
Rotmos med fläsk	Mashed roots with pork	Mashed root vegetables, usually rutabaga, carrots and sometimes potatoes, served with long-boiled salted pork loin.
Räksmörgås	Shrimp sandwich	Open sandwich with shrimp, egg and mayonnaise. Lettuce, tomato or cucumber are commonly added, usually topped with lemon and dill.
Sillsallad	Herring salad	A Russian-style chopped cold-salad side dish made with pickled herring, boiled cold potatoes, boiled cold beets, minced raw onion, fresh dill, and sour cream.
Smörgåstårta	Sandwich cake	Like a very big multi-layer sandwich. Comes with many different fillings and toppings, often including shrimp, ham, mayonnaise, salad, and preserved fruits.
S.O.S. (smör, ost och sill)	Butter, cheese and herring	Appetizer dish made with butter, cheese, and herring.
Stekt fläsk med löksås och potatis		Pork with onion sauce and potatoes.
Stekt strömming	Fried herring	Fileted fresh herring, two filets put flesh to flesh, skin out, with dill, salt and ground white pepper between and breadcrumbs on the outside, and then fried in butter until golden. Eaten with mashed potatoes and lingonberry jam. Very different from surströmming.
Surströmming	Fermented Baltic herring	Being fermented, surströmming has a strong odour and unique flavour and is considered an acquired taste even among Swedes. Usually eaten with thin, hard bread.
Sylta	Swedish head cheese	Made primarily from finely chopped pork pulled soft from a boiled pig head and mixed with the gelatin from the skull and various spices and pressed to form a loaf that is served chilled so that the gelatin sets.
Wallenbergare		Patty of ground veal, cream, and egg yolks, coated in breadcrumbs.

=== Seafood ===
Fish and other seafood are an important part of Swedish cuisine. Farmed salmon from Norway has become increasingly popular. Pickled, sweetened herring, inlagd sill, is a traditional Swedish appetizer. Shrimp and lobster are specialties of the Skagerrak coast. Surströmming is a fermented Baltic herring famous for its pungent aroma, both loved and hated. Crayfish, boiled in salted water with dill, are a late summer Swedish delicacy.

=== Desserts ===
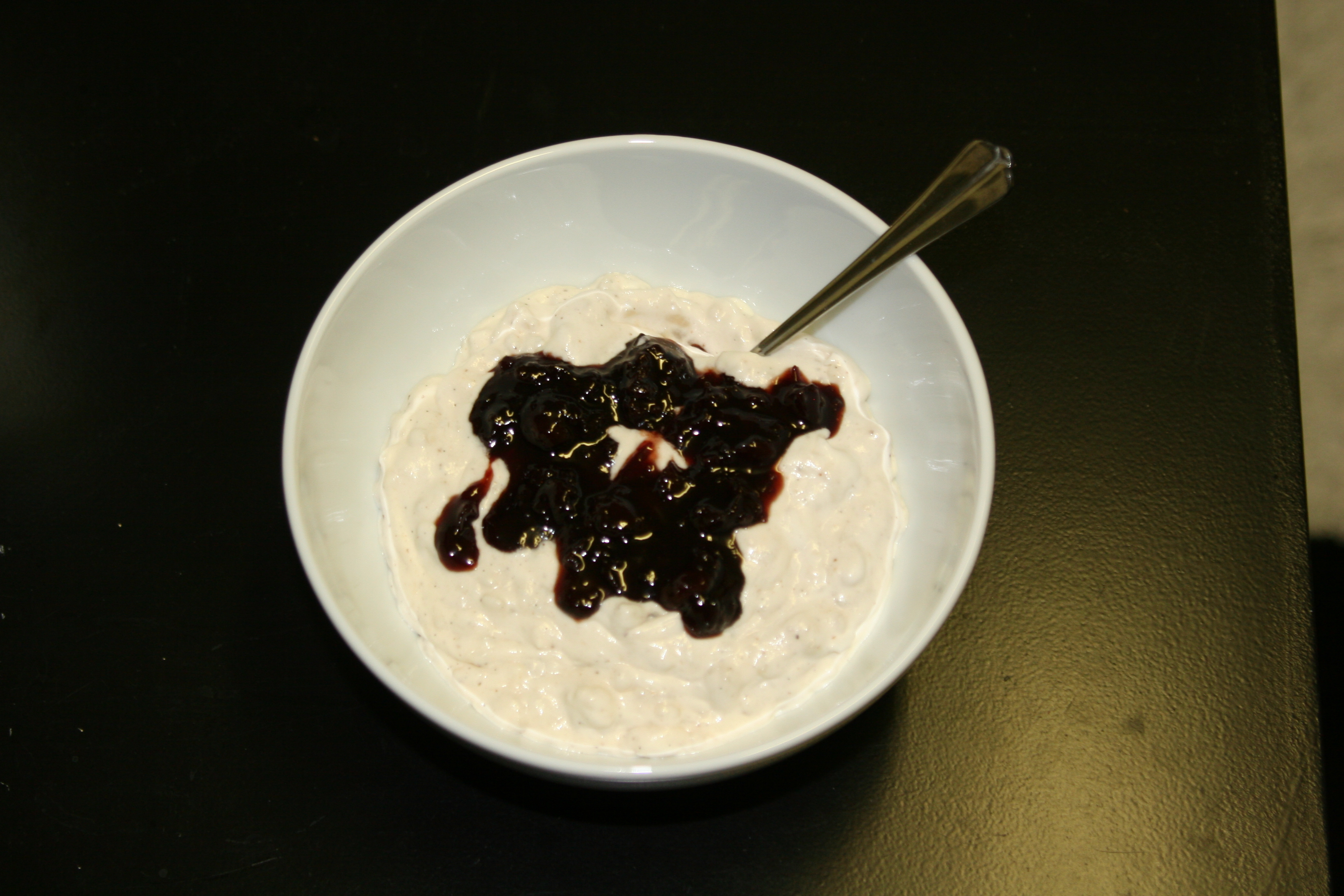
Ris à la Malta (Ris à l'amande), a Christmas dessert.

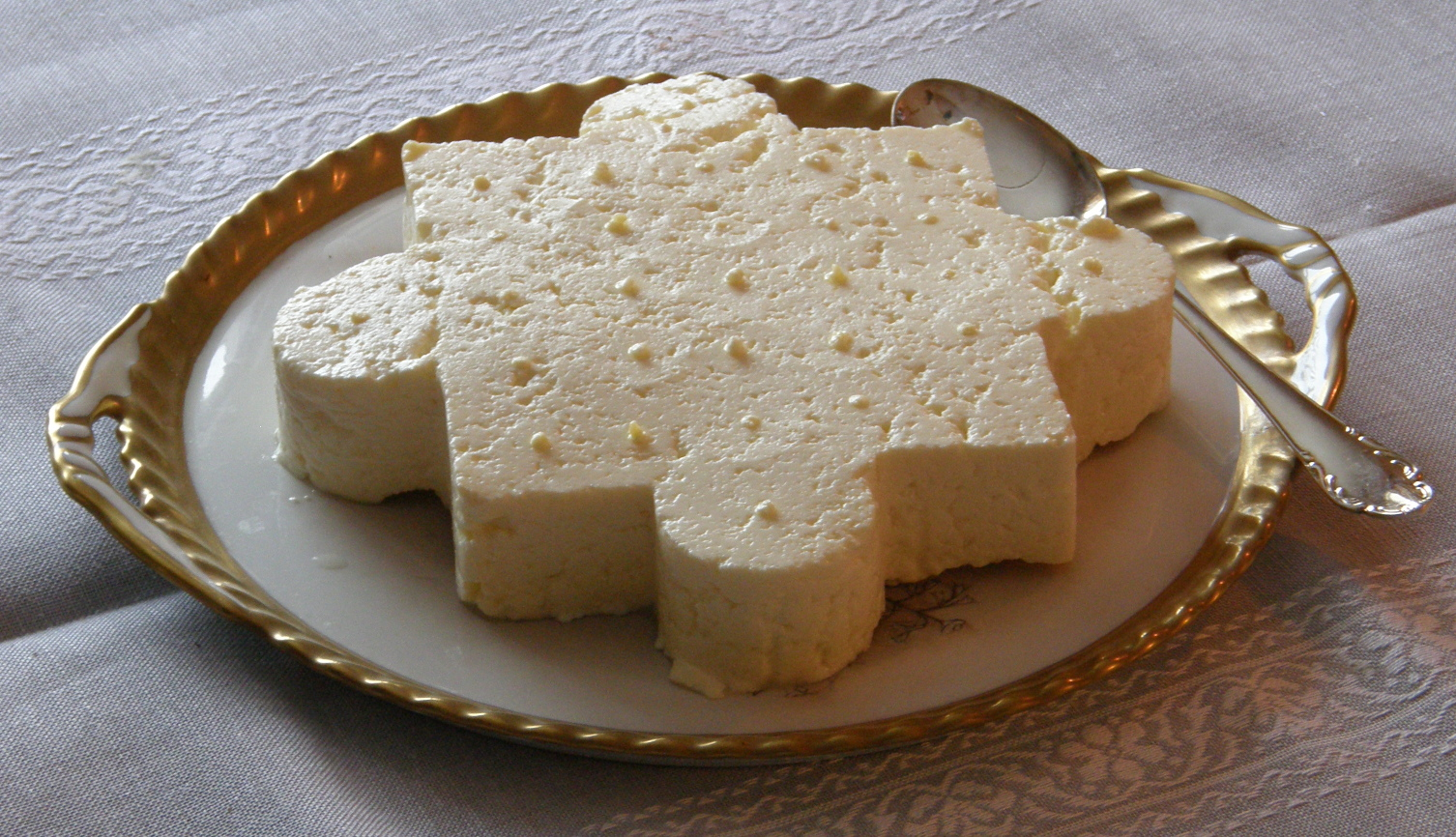
Äggost

Common desserts include:

Swedish	English	Definition
Gotländsk saffranspannkaka		Rice pudding dessert with saffron originating in Gotland usually served with jam or whipped cream, or dewberry jam.
Kalvdans		A classic Scandinavian dessert made from unpasteurized colostrum milk, the first milk produced by a cow after giving birth.
Klappgröt		Semolina pudding mixed with juice from either red currant, lingonberries, raspberries, blackberries, or comparable fruits, then stirred or blended until the texture is fluffier. Eaten cold.
Ostkaka		Swedish cheesecake (very different from American cheesecake).
Pannkaka		Pancakes are almost never served for breakfast ('American-style') but either as dessert with sweet jam or whipped cream, or as a meal in itself, using fewer sweet toppings. Pancakes for dinner can be thick oven-baked pancakes with pork meat or apples inside.
Smördegspaj	Butter dough based pie.	Various kinds of pies and cookies are typical desserts, mostly served with coffee. Typical pies are apple pie, blueberry pie and rhubarb pie.
Smulpaj	Crumb pie	Various kinds of pies and cookies are typical desserts, mostly served with coffee. Typical pies are apple pie, blueberry pie and rhubarb pie.
Spettekaka		A sweet dry hollow Swedish cake, shaped like a cylinder, and similar to meringue, found only in a southern province of Sweden, Scania.
Våfflor	Waffles	Often served with jam and whipped cream or ice cream. Waffles also have their own day on 25 March.
Äggost		A dish originating from Bohuslän. In the southern parts of the county it is traditionally served as a dessert along with whipped cream, sugar and blackberry jam, but in the northern parts it is usually seen as a main dish or breakfast and often served with pickled herring.

== Pastries and treats ==
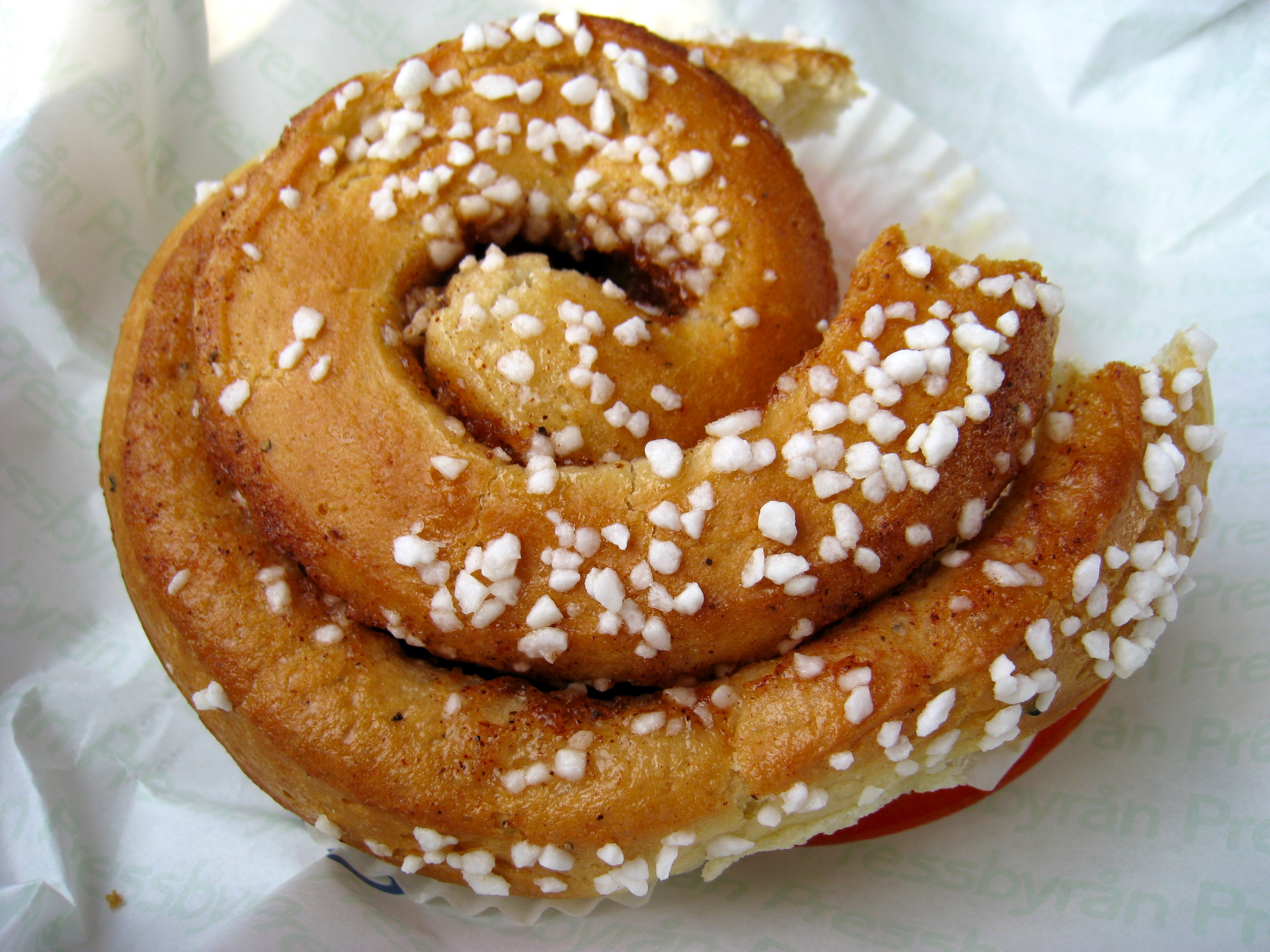
Cinnamon roll (kanelbulle)

=== Kaffebröd (coffee bread) ===
Bakelser and other types of kaffebröd (or more colloquially fikabröd) are various forms of pastries, cake, cookies, and buns that are usually consumed with coffee (see fika). Popular kinds of kaffebröd available in a traditional Swedish konditori (coffee shop / pâtisserie) include:

Swedish	English	Definition
Kanelbulle		Cinnamon roll, optionally made with cardamom dough
Wienerbröd		A Danish pastry; comes in several varieties and shapes; very similar to a Danish pastry in the US.
Chokladboll	Chocolate ball.	A round chocolate-flavoured butter ball with oatmeal, cocoa and sugar, coated in coconut flakes or pearl sugar.
Kringla		A small pretzel-shaped (sweet) cookie with pearl sugar on top.
Punschrulle	Punsch-roll	A small cylindrical pastry covered with green marzipan with the ends dipped in chocolate, and inside a mix of crushed cookies, butter, and cacao, flavoured with punsch liqueur. This pastry is often called dammsugare ('vacuum cleaner'), it might be referring to the shape and design of older vacuum cleaners or how the pastry used to be made of collected leftover crumbs. Other names are arraksrulle (as arrak (arrack) is an ingredient in punsch) and '150-ohmer' (owing to the brown-green-brown colouring, resembling a 150 ohm resistor).
Biskvi		A small round pastry with a base: made from almonds and sugar, filled with butter cream and covered with a thin layer of chocolate. First made in France during the 19th century.
Prinsesstårta	Princess cake	A large cake, made of sponge cake layered with whipped cream, and custard under a green marzipan coating with powdered sugar on the top; often decorated with a pink marzipan rose.
Budapestbakelse	Budapest pastry	Basically made from sugar, egg white, hazelnuts, whipped cream, and pieces of fruit like apricot or mandarine, decorated with a little chocolate and powdered sugar.
Napoleonbakelse	Napolitain	Made of pastry dough, whipped cream, custard and jam, topped with icing and currant jelly.
Napoleonbakelse	Napoleon pastry	Made of pastry dough, whipped cream, custard and jam, topped with icing and currant jelly.
Kladdkaka		A chocolatey and sticky flat cake. Similar to a chocolate brownie, but a bit undercooked with a creamy center.
Toscakaka		Light sponge topped with caramelized almonds.
Arraksboll		A ball flavoured with arrak, similar in appearance to a chokladboll but very different taste.

=== Treats ===
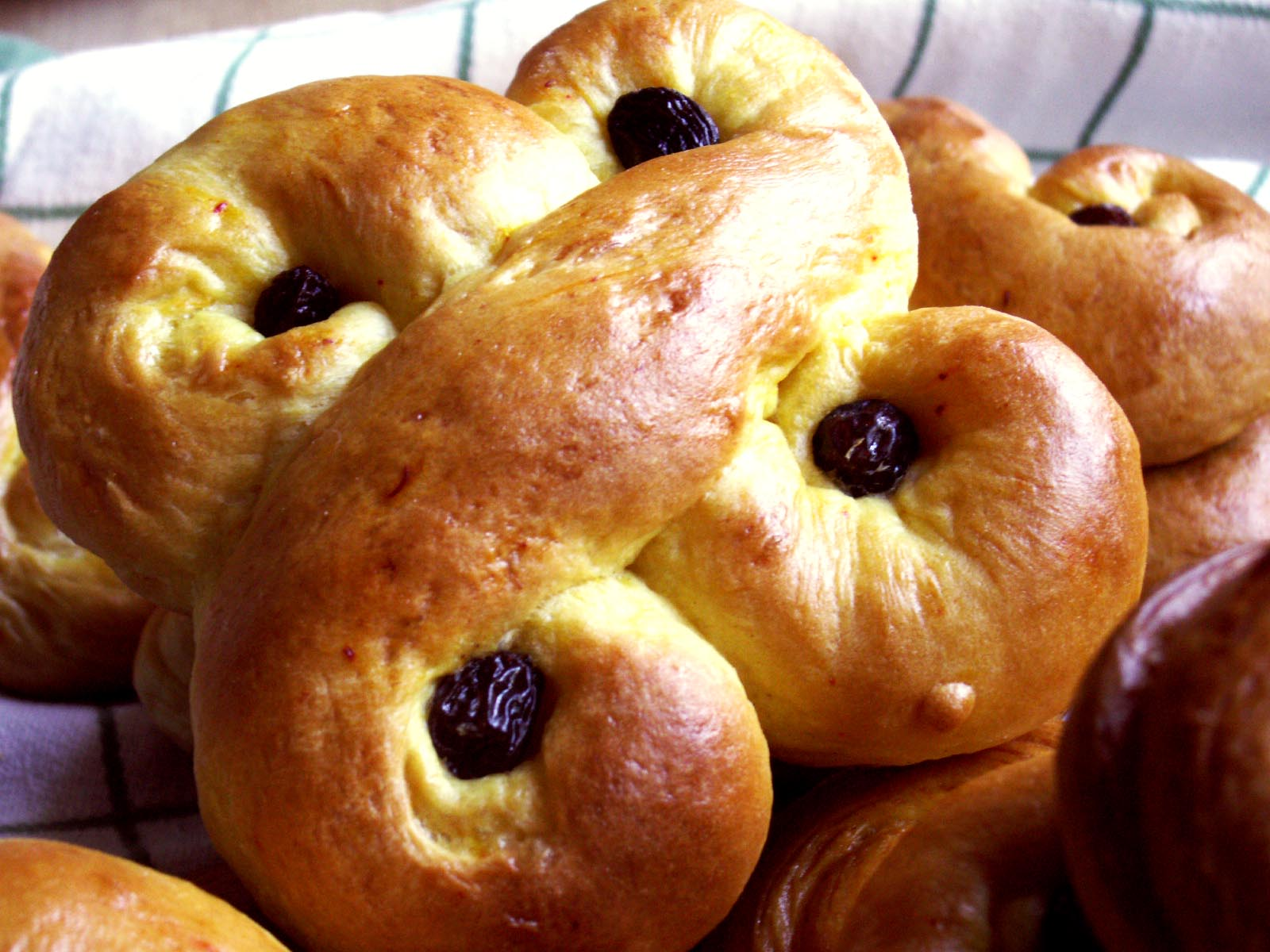
Saffron bun, also called St. Lucia bun (lussebulle)

During the winter holidays, traditional candy and pastries include:

Treats	Definition
Knäck	Christmas toffee. (Hard, usually to be sucked, not chewed. The soft variety is called kola, which is chewy, and may be flavoured. )
Ischoklad	Coconut oil mixed with chocolate.
Marmelad	'Marmalade candy', rectangular fruit and pectin based candy in various colours.
Lussekatt	Saffron bun, a Swedish saffron bun eaten on the Saint Lucia celebration (13 December).
Pepparkaka	Similar to a ginger snaps (has been eaten since the 14th century and baked at the monastery of Vadstena since 1444); associated with Christmas.
Semla	With the new year, the fastlagsbulle (Lenten bun), or semla, is baked. It is a wheat bun with a cream and almond paste filling, traditionally eaten on Shrove Tuesday.

Other typical Swedish candy includes:

Candy	Definition
Saltlakrits	Liquorice candy flavoured with ammonium chloride.
Polkagris	Traditional peppermint stick candy from Gränna, also made in other flavours.
Ahlgrens bilar	A marshmallow candy shaped like a car. Marketed as "Sweden's most purchased car" (Swedish: Sveriges mest köpta bil).
Sockerbitar	Similar to square, chewy marshmallows.
Geléhallon	An early form of gelatine-based candy.
Daim	Formerly called Dime in the UK.

== Drinks ==
Sweden is in second place among the heaviest coffee-drinking countries in the world. Milk consumption in Sweden is also very high, second only to Finland. Milk is bought in milk cartons; Tetra Pak, the world's largest maker of milk cartons, was founded in Sweden. Milk is considered the standard drink to have with meals during weekdays in many families, for both children and adults. Cordial is very common in Sweden. In the early summer elder flower cordial, and less commonly lilac cordial, are made. In the late summer other cordials, such as black currant cordial, are made.

=== Christmas beverages ===
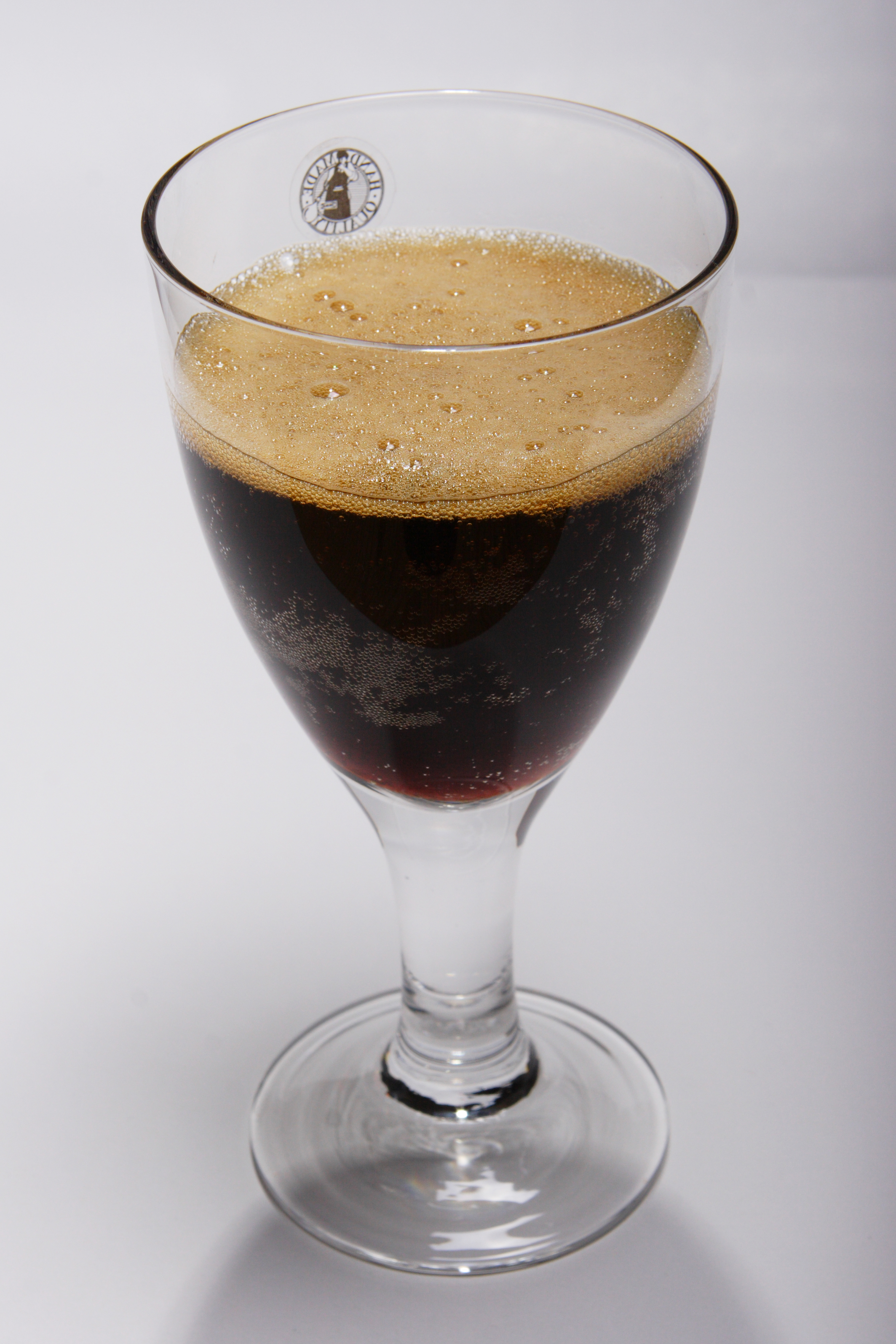
Julmust

Drink	Definition
Glögg
Julmust	Sweet seasonal carbonated soft drink (jul ‒ a cognate of the English yule ‒ means Christmas in Swedish)
Svagdricka
Mumma	A traditional Christmas beverage. Usually a mix of porter or another dark beer, some light beer (pilsner), port wine (or some other wine), and something sweet (sockerdricka or julmust); commonly spiced with cardamom.
Mulled wine

=== Sweet drinks ===
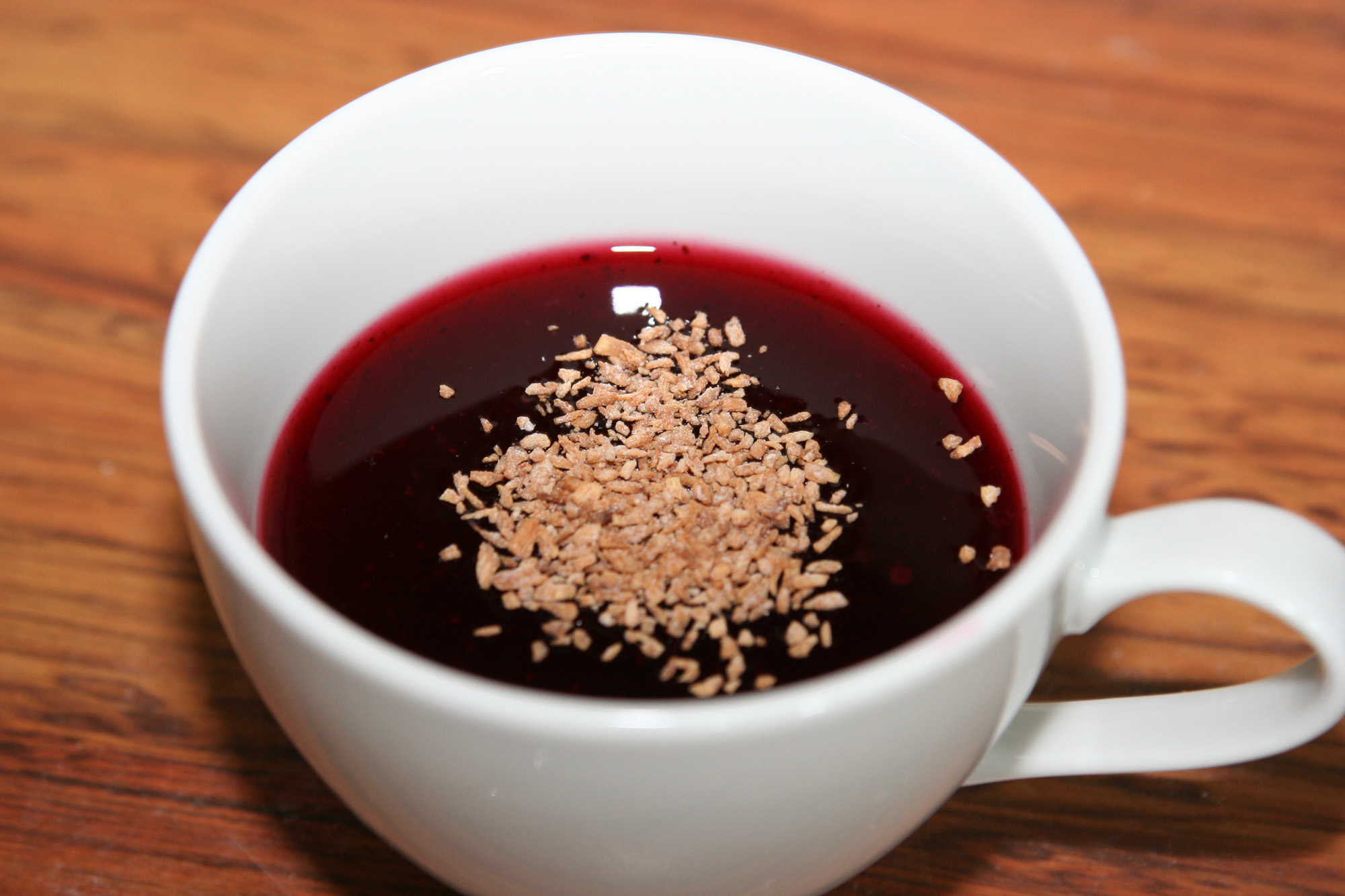
A cup of blueberry soup, (blåbärssoppa) topped with cereals

Swedish	English	Definition
Blåbärssoppa	Bilberry soup	Sweet soup or drink made from bilberries, served either hot or cold
Enbärsdricka		Juniper berry soft drink
Sockerdricka	Sugar drink	Sweet-sour soft drink (carbonated)
Fruktsoda		Traditional lemon-lime soft drink (carbonated)
Champis		Soft drink alternative to sparkling wine (carbonated)
Pommac		Soft drink alternative to sparkling wine (carbonated)
Trocadero		Soft drink with the taste of apple and oranges, with its roots in the north of Sweden
Lingondricka		Lingonberry drink
Nyponsoppa	Rose hip soup	Sweet soup or drink made from rose hips, served either hot or cold

=== Liquor ===
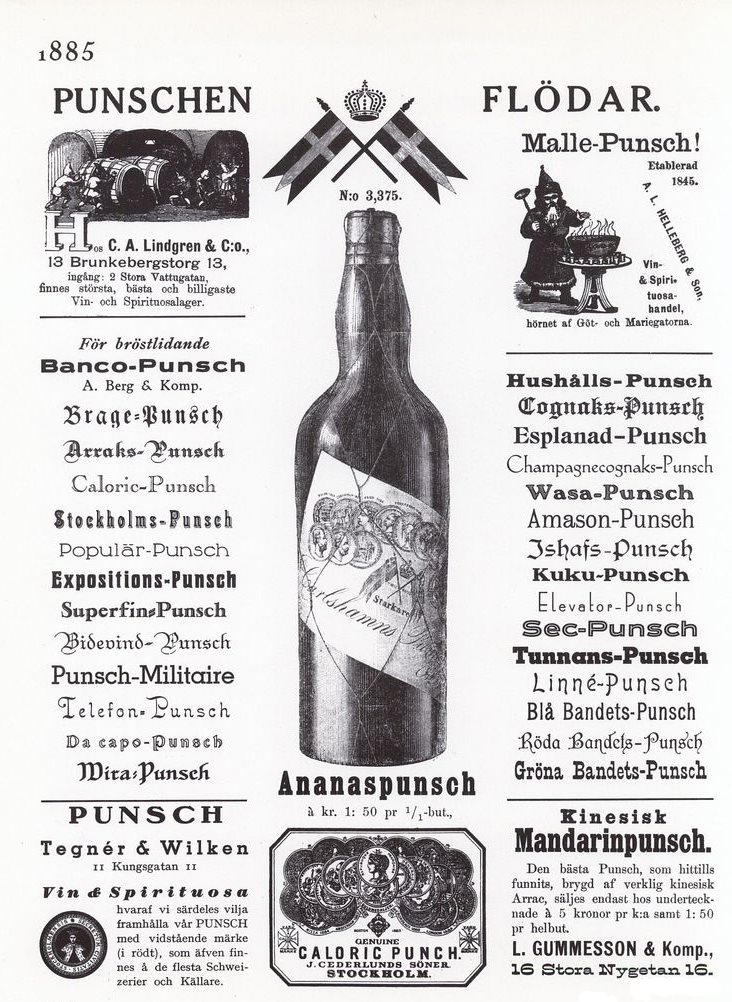
Caloric punsch advertisement c. 1885

The production of liquor has a tradition dating back to the 18th century and was at a high in the 1840s. Since the 1880s, the state-owned Systembolaget has a monopoly on selling spirits with more than 3.5% ABV, limiting access. Hembränt (moonshine) used to be made in rural Sweden, but production has lessened in recent years due to more liberal rules for the import of alcohol as well as increased smuggling.

Punsch is a traditional liqueur in Sweden that was immensely popular during the 19th century. It was adopted as the drink of choice by university students, and many traditional songs from that time are about the consumption of punsch or are meant to be sung during the collective festivities that were part of the cultural life in the universities' student associations at the time and still is.

=== Beer ===
Beer is also widely consumed in Sweden and the typical Swedish beer is lager of a bright and malty kind. The brands Pripps Blå and Norrlands Guld are common examples. In the last few decades, many small breweries (microbreweries) have emerged all over Sweden offering a wide range of styles and brands. Nils Oscar Brewery, Dugges Ale och Porterbryggeri and Närke Kulturbryggeri are examples of these young Swedish microbreweries. Many microbreweries in Sweden are inspired by the US craft beer movement, brewing American styles or styles commonly associated with American craft breweries, e.g. American Pale Ale and American IPA.

== Food and society ==
Brödinstitutet ('The Bread Institute') once campaigned with a quotation from the Swedish National Board of Health and Welfare, recommending eating six to eight slices of bread daily. Drinking milk has also been recommended and campaigned for by the Swedish National Board of Health and Welfare; it is often recommended to drink two to three glasses of milk per day. A survey conducted on behalf of Mjölkfrämjandet, an organisation promoting consumption of Swedish milk, concluded that 52% of Swedes surveyed drink milk at least once a day, usually one glass with lunch and another glass or two in the evening or morning.

Low-fat products, wholemeal bread and other alternatives are common; grocery stores usually sell milk in four or five different fat levels, from 3% to 0.1%.

=== Swedengate ===
A post on Reddit went viral and gave rise to the myth that Swedes don't feed their guests, especially children. It was named Swedengate and started with someone writing a personal post about how, as a child, had to wait in the Swedish friend's room while the friend ate a family dinner.

“I remember going to my Swedish friend’s house. And while we were playing in his room, his mom yelled that dinner was ready. And check this. He told me to WAIT in his room while they ate.”

The personal story was misunderstood as part of Swedish culture because the subject of the thread was: “What is the weirdest thing you had to do at someone else’s house because of their culture/religion?”

Especially in the 1900s, family dinners were common in Sweden, with the whole family gathered around the dinner table. So children who played at friends’ houses were expected to be home by a certain time to eat dinner with their own family. Dinner times could differ slightly between families, which could result in one child eating dinner before a friend. To eat a larger meal or stay overnight at a friend's house, the families are expected to plan it in advance. At least the host family is expected to call the visitor's parents and ask for permission. It is about not interfering with other families’ habits or how they raise their children.

This dinner guest culture is not only typical in Sweden, but also in other Nordic countries, the Netherlands, northern Germany and some other parts of Western and Central Europe.

According to the original Reddit post, it was the friend who asked the guest to wait in the room, not the friend's parents. It is not clear whether the friend's parents were aware of what was happening and the fact that they had a guest.

Children may get hungry before dinner time, especially if their friends eat dinner earlier, but this is not the same as starving and not getting any food. Also, letting children starve or keeping someone locked in a room is illegal in Sweden.

== See also ==
- Sami cuisine
- Cuisine of Finland
- Cuisine of Norway
- Culture of Sweden
- Danish cuisine
- Icelandic cuisine
- List of Christmas dishes
- Swedish festivities
