= Trocadero (drink) =

Swedish soda

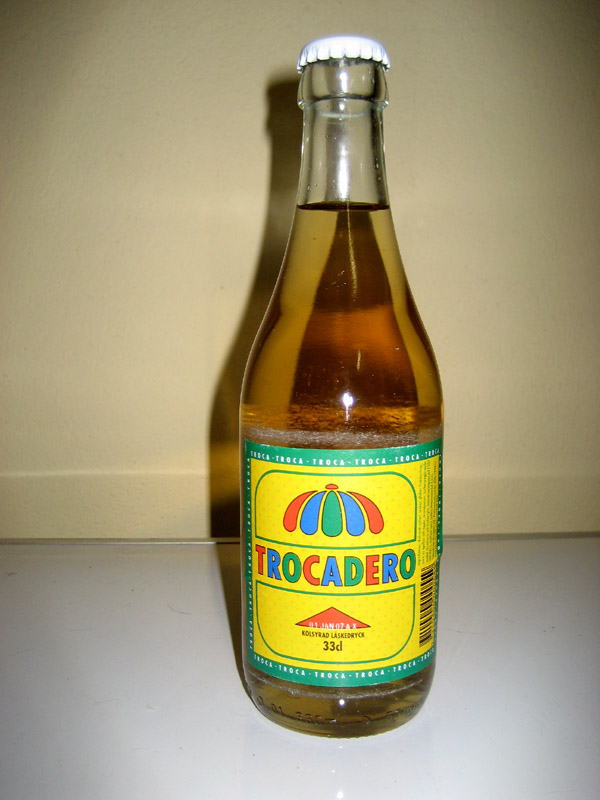
- Swedish soft drink Trocadero
- Type: Soft drink
- Distributor: Spendrups
- Origin: Sweden, Scania
- Introduced: 1953
- Flavour: Apple and orange
- Website: trocadero.nu

Trocadero, also known as Troca, is an apple and orange flavoured Swedish soda containing caffeine. It was launched in Sweden in the summer of 1953 by Saturnus AB in Malmö, Sweden. Trocadero has been especially popular in Norrland, the northern part of Sweden, and has therefore been called the "national beverage of Norrland".

== The name ==
Trocadero was introduced by Nils-Håkan Håkansson at Saturnus AB, and according to his grandson Edward Liepe, the name Trocadero comes from either Place du Trocadéro or Café du Trocadéro, both located in Paris, where it is pronounced with stress on the final o, but among Swedes drinking Trocadero the stress has generally been on e. However, the French name goes back to Isla del Trocadero in Spain, and in Spanish it is pronounced like in Swedish.

== History ==
The same year Trocadero was introduced, the ban of cola drinks was lifted in Sweden. Both Coca-Cola and Cuba Cola (the latter also brewed by Saturnus) were introduced to the market. For a long time, Trocadero was the only soda, except from cola, to contain caffeine.

Saturnus eventually shifted focus and began selling essences for liquor and drink mixes. Along that line, they also began selling soda essences to other breweries instead of producing the soda themselves. Their production of Trocadero came to an end, and in 2006 they sold the brand to NordArom AB who allowed selected breweries licensed manufacturing. Since 2017, the brand was acquired by Spendrups Bryggeri AB, but Hammars Bryggeri, Mora Bryggeri and Vasa bryggeri still had licensed manufacturing until late 2017 when Spendrups was made the only licensed manufacturer.

== Other ==
Trocadero can be also found as bulk confectionery. The green and yellow bottle is made from jelly and tastes like Trocadero. Fagerströms Karamellfabrik in Hudiksvall started producing and selling Trocadero hard candy in 2005. According to Trocadero's Facebook page, they are no longer in production.

== Ingredients ==
- Carbonated water
- Sugar
- Juice of apple and orange
- Aromas
- Caffeine
- Acidity regulators (citric acid, phosphoric acid)
- Preservatives (potassium sorbate, sodium benzoate)
- Dyestuff (caramel E150D)
- Antioxidants (Ascorbic acid)
