= Falukorv =

Swedish sausage

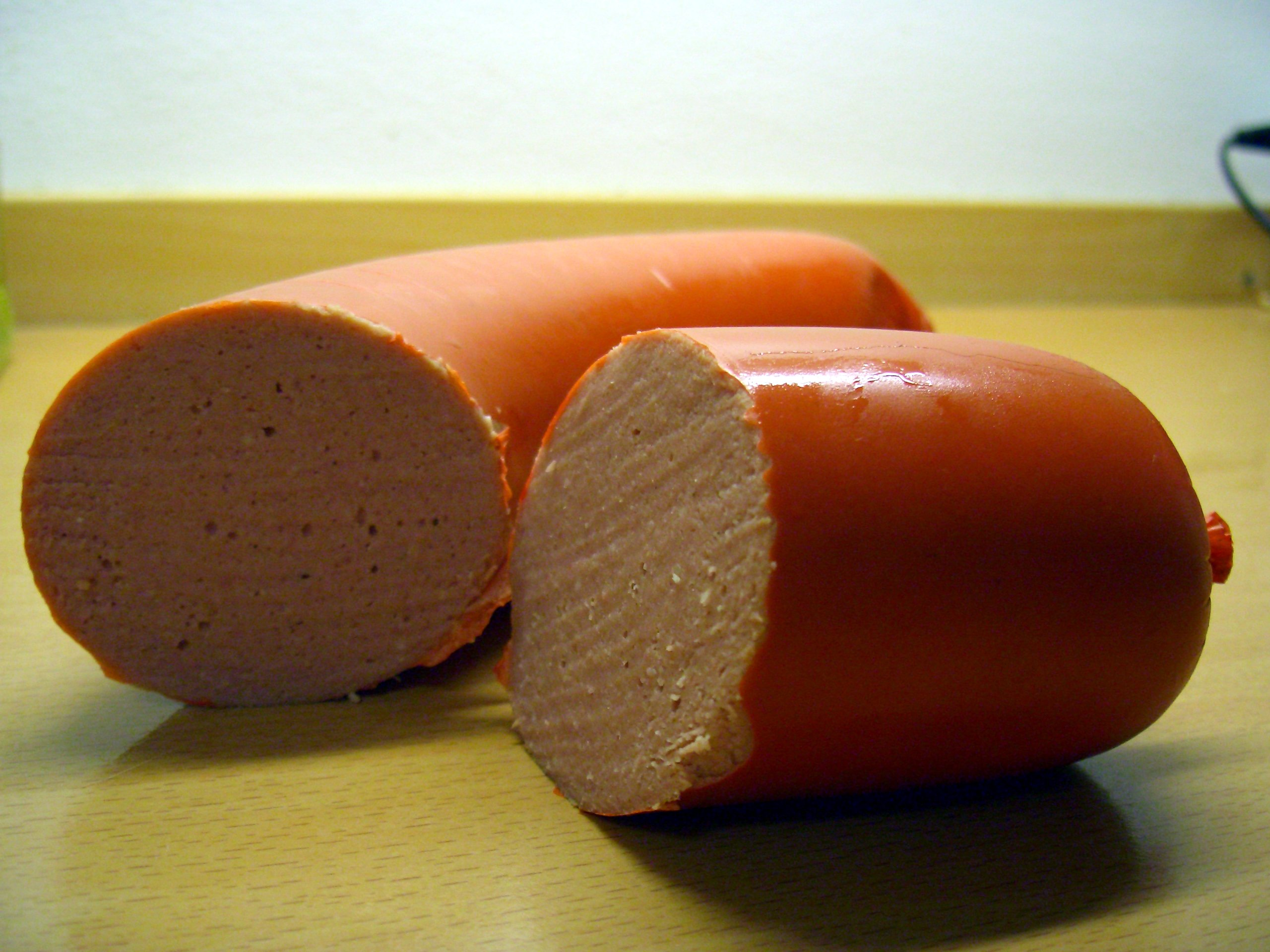
- A picture of a falukorv, split in half. The outermost red layer is a wrapper made of paper and cellulose, which is removed prior to preparation and consumption
- Region or state: Dalarna
- Associated cuisine: Swedish
- Invented: c. 16-17th century
- Serving temperature: Hot, occasionally cold
- Main ingredients: Smoked pork and beef/veal, potato starch,
- Ingredients generally used: onion, salt, spices
- Food energy (per 100 g serving): 260 kcal (1,100 kJ)
Nutritional value
(per 100 g serving)
- Protein: 9 g
- Fat: 23 g
- Carbohydrate: 4 g
- Similar dishes: Middagskorv

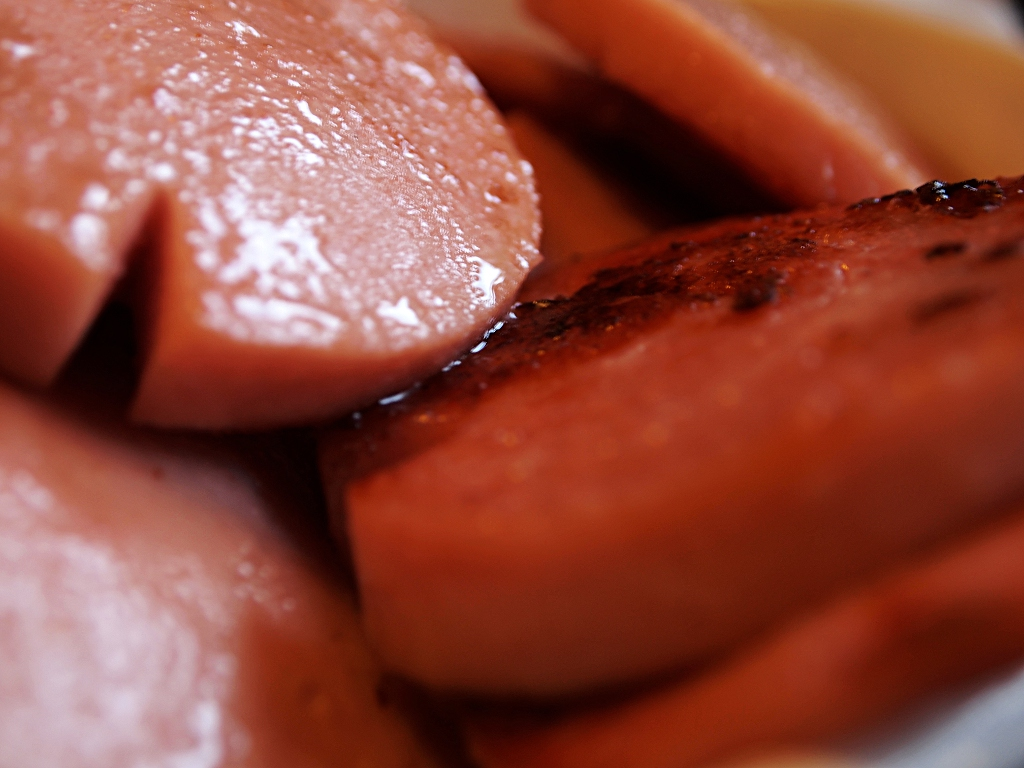
Fried falukorv

Falukorv (/ˈfɑːluːkɔːrv/ FAH-loo-korv, Swedish: [ˈfɑ̂ːlɵˌkɔrv]), or Falu sausage in English, is a type of sausage (korv in Swedish) that originates from Falun, Sweden. It is made from a mixture of smoked pork and beef or veal, blended with potato starch flour, onion, salt, and mild spices. Falukorv is pre-cooked, which means it can be eaten cold without any further preparation.

== Description ==
Falukorv is classified in Sweden as both a type of bräckkorv (a lightly cooked sausage) and emulsionskorv (an emulsified sausage). It is considered a typically Swedish product and is a common ingredient in many dishes in Swedish cuisine. Since 1973, the term "Falukorv" has been protected under EU law as a product with a specific origin and recipe.

According to Swedish food regulations, falukorv must contain at least 45% meat (which may include pork, beef, or horse meat); however, many commercially available versions contain a higher percentage of meat. The declared meat content also includes the meat's natural fat and water. The Swedish Food Agency regulates how much connective tissue (like tendons) may be included, and sets maximum fat content levels for pork and beef used in production.

Traditionally, falukorv has a curved shape, which is a natural result of using natural casings. In recent years, straight versions have also been produced, mainly for use in large-scale catering, but most consumers still prefer the traditional curved form.

== History ==
The history of falukorv reaches back to the Falun copper mine during the 16th and 17th century, where ox hide was used for ropes and some of the meat remaining after slaughter was salted and smoked and used for sausages.

The tradition of preparing the meat in this way was revitalised in the late 19th century by the butcher Anders Olsson, whose initiation led to the development of the modern falukorv, which uses a mixture of pork and beef or veal.

== Variants ==
=== TSG falukorv ===
A popular sausage, falukorv has Traditional Speciality Guaranteed-status in the EU, UK, and Norway. Under EU law, restrictions apply to what may be labeled as "falukorv". Only potato flour may be used as a binding agent, and the amount of meat may not fall short of 45%, although most brands of falukorv have a significantly higher meat percentage. The TSG status does, however, not require the sausage to be manufactured in Falun.

=== Middagskorv ===
Because of its TSG status, only sausages made from a specific recipe may be called falukorv; it may not be made with any alternative ingredients. Manufacturers therefore use the term middagskorv (dinner sausage) to describe variations, such as sausages with a lower fat content of 9% instead of the standard 23%, chicken, or vegetarian versions made from soy, pea and potato protein, or quorn.

== See also ==
- Leberkäse
