= Kladdkaka =

Swedish chocolate cake

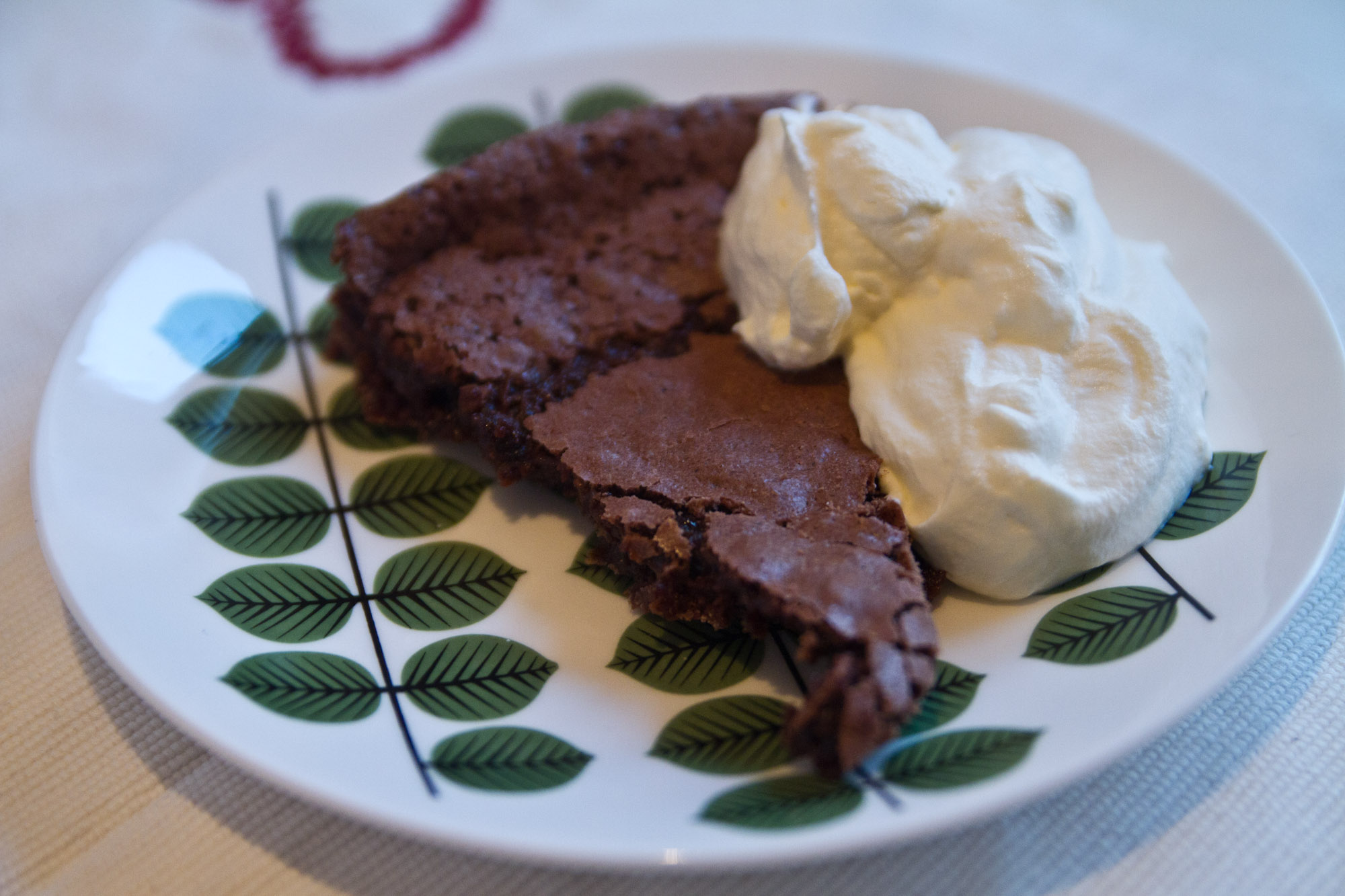
- Kladdkaka with whipped cream
- Alternative names: Chocolate mud cake
- Type: Chocolate cake
- Course: Dessert
- Place of origin: Sweden
- Main ingredients: Sugar, flour, butter, egg and cocoa

Kladdkaka is a popular Swedish dessert. This dense, compact cake, similar to a molten chocolate cake, features a crisp exterior and soft, gooey interior. The ingredients are flour, eggs, butter, sugar, vanilla essence and cocoa powder. The main difference between kladdkaka and other cakes is the lack of baking powder. It is sometimes eaten with whipped cream or vanilla ice cream and raspberry coulis and/or raspberries.

The name derives from the Swedish word kladdig, meaning 'sticky' or 'messy'.

Since 2008, the official kladdkaka day is 7 November.

== History ==
There are two main theories regarding the cake's origin. In 1938, when baking powder was difficult to get hold of in Sweden, Gudrun Isaksson, a woman from Örebro, used an American brownie recipe and simply left out the baking powder. The other theory is verified, but both may still be accurate. In 1968, Margareta Wickman, was served a chocolate cake at a restaurant in Paris and was given the recipe. She later published the recipe in a couple of different variants in the Swedish magazine Vecko-Journalen, during the late 1970s.

== See also ==
- Molten chocolate cake
- List of cakes
- Coffee bread in Swedish cuisine
