= Hallongrotta =

Cookie with raspberry jam filling

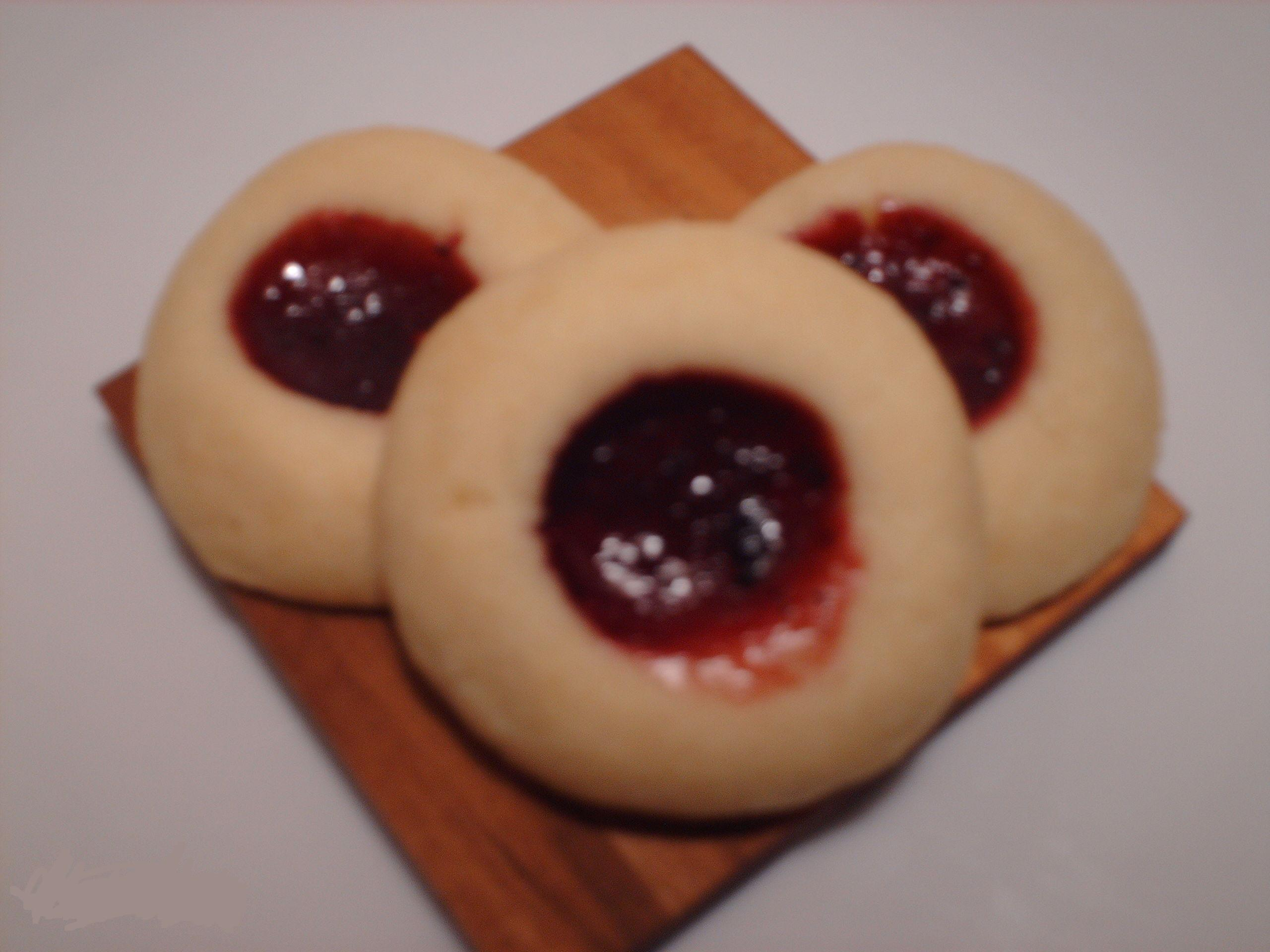
- Alternative names: Thumbprint cookies, jam drops, jelly tots, thimble cookies, Hussar balls, jam cookies, deep-well cookies, pits of love
- Type: Cookie
- Place of origin: Sweden
- Main ingredients: raspberry jam

Hallongrotta (plural: hallongrottor) is the name of a common Swedish cookie. The name means raspberry cave in Swedish. In the United States they are known as thumbprint cookies, as well as by many other names. Similar cookies sold in Australia are known as jam drops.

The cookies are similar to shortbread cookies with an added filling. It is an easily baked molded cookie. The cookies are typically made with butter, flour, baking powder, sugar and vanilla. The cookies are usually filled with raspberry jam.

== History ==
Hallongrotta can be traced back to the 1800s, where they were eaten at Swedish gatherings called kafferep.

== See also ==
- Christmas cookies
- Cuisine of Sweden
