= Sju sorters kakor =

Scandinavian tradition

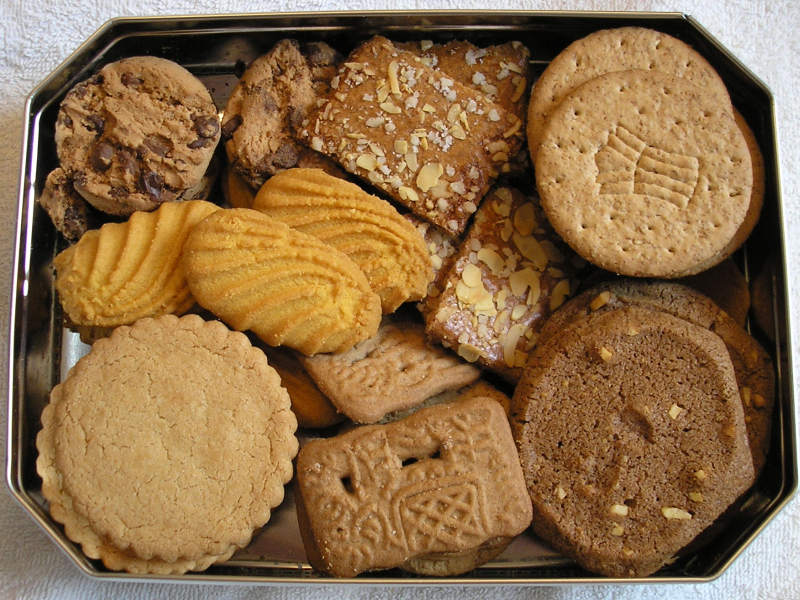
Assortment of cookies

Sju sorters kakor (Norwegian: syv slags kaker), "seven kinds of cookies", is a Swedish and Norwegian tradition where hosts typically prepare seven different kinds of cookies for their guests. While the specific type of cookie varies from household to household, the number of types is consistently seven, as less than seven would indicate an insufficient host, while over seven would indicate a pretentious host. While the tradition started in Sweden, it has since spread to Norwegian and Scandinavian-American households.

== History ==
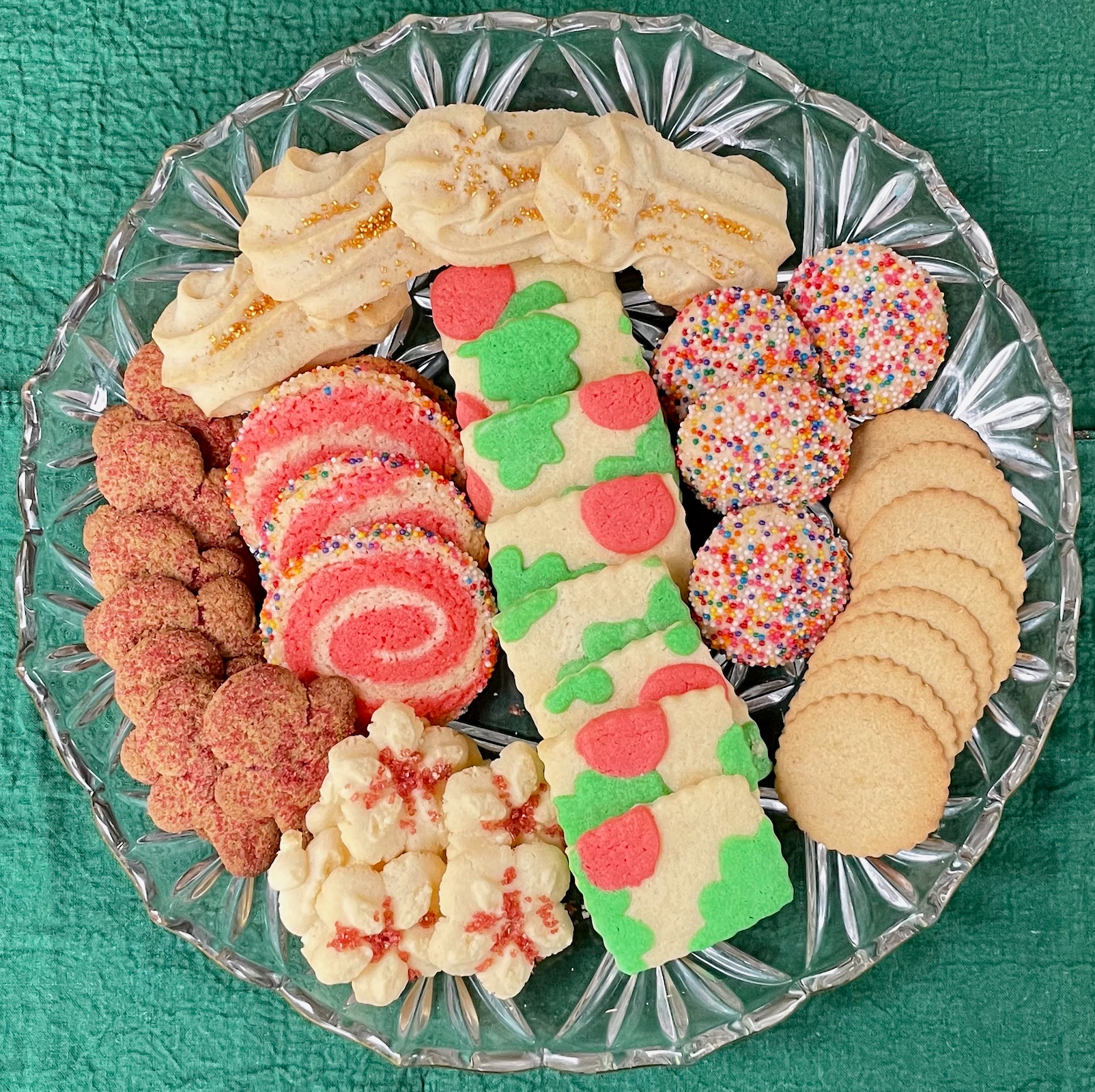
Seven sorts of cookies

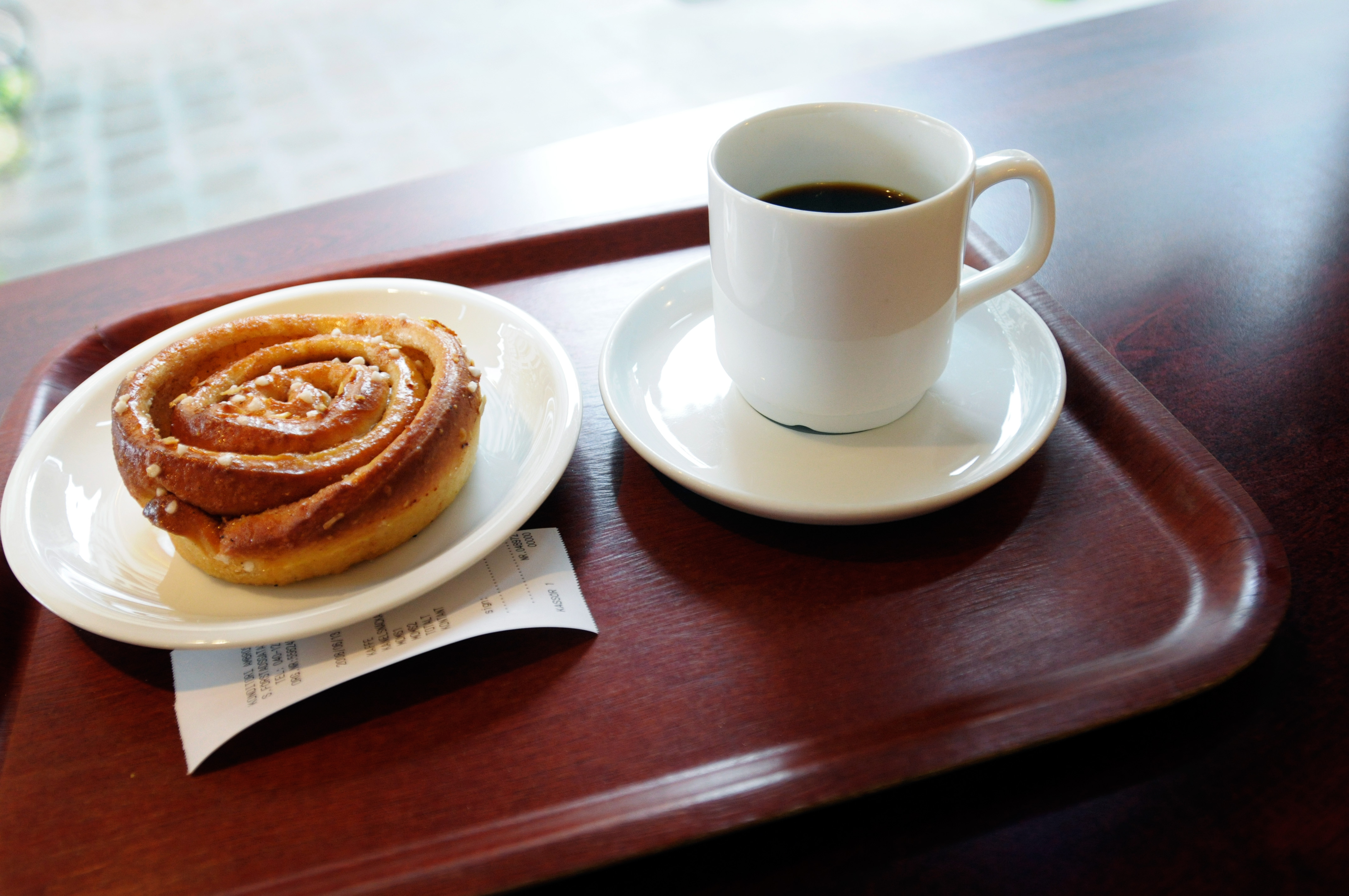
Swedish custom of fika, featuring coffee and kanelbullar, a Swedish cinnamon roll

In 1823, Sweden lifted its ban on coffee consumption, leading to more coffee being drunk around the country. This led to an increase in 'kaffehus' – small cafés that would typically serve coffee and småkakor (little cookies). As cafés became more popular and fika became more common, competition for the highest quality cookies became rampant, and hosts were pressured to create varieties of different cookies for guests to enjoy.

In 1945, following the lifting of rationing caused by World War II, cookies and their ingredients were easier to come by, and much cheaper to make. The cookbook Swedish Cakes and Cookies (Swedish title: Sju sorters kakor) by Märta Holmgren was published, selling over 3.8 million copies and being Sweden's best-selling cookbook to date. This spread the tradition further and increased its popularity through the 20th century.

== Types of cookies ==
Typical Scandinavian cookies
Cookie type	Picture	Description
Finska pinnar, or Finnish sticks		a crispy almond cookie topped with pearl sugar
Schackrutor, or chessboard squares		a shortbread cookie split between vanilla and cocoa-flavored dough in a checkerboard pattern
Kardemummaskorpor, or cardamom rusks		a sugar cookie topped with crushed cardamom seeds
Brysselkex, or Brussels biscuits		a sugar cookie topped with red-colored sugar
Muskotsnittar, or nutmeg slices		a stick-shaped cookie coated in cinnamon and ginger
Drömmar, or dreams		a vanilla cookie characterized by its light and airy texture
Havreflarn, or oat lace cookies		a chewy, flat oatmeal cookie
Hallongrottor, or raspberry caves		a thumbprint cookie typically filled with various jams, especially raspberry
Mandelkubb, or almond biscuits		a slightly dry almond pastry raised with baker's ammonia.
Pepparkakor		a gingerbread cookie
Strassburgare		a piped, vanilla pastry containing potato flour
