= Budapest roll =

Swedish chocolate cake

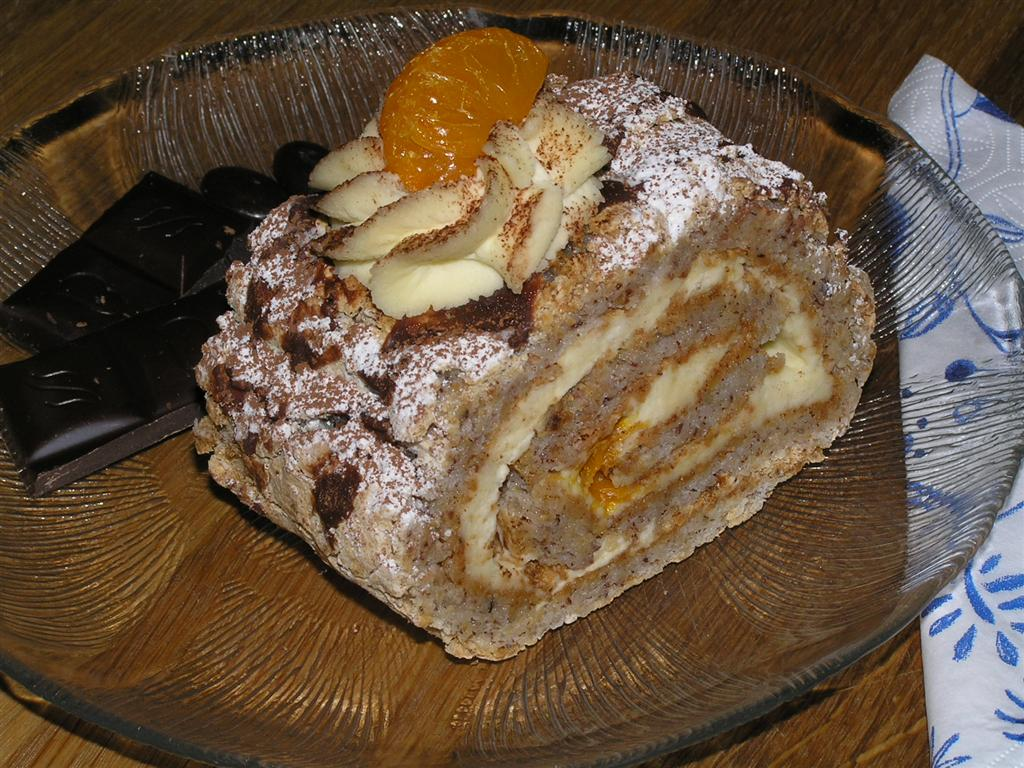
- Budapest roll with chocolate and a slice of orange
- Alternative names: Budapestbakelse, Budapestarulle, Budapeststubbe
- Type: Pastry
- Course: Dessert
- Place of origin: Sweden
- Region or state: Vetlanda Municipality
- Main ingredients: Sugar, flour, butter, egg white, meringue, hazelnut, chocolate, and fruit

The Budapest roll (Swedish: Budapestlängd') is a classic Swedish dessert made with hazelnut-meringue, egg white, whipped cream, dark chocolate, and fruit, typically mandarin oranges or raspberries. It is sometimes served during fika.

It is baked as a roll cake with a hazelnut base where cream and fruit mixture are spread. It is then rolled, drizzled with chocolate, and cut into portions.

The Budapest roll has its own holiday, celebrated annually on May 1st.

== History ==
The Budapest roll was invented around 1969 by Ingvar Strid.

When Vetlanda, the municipality where the inventor was born, reached a population of 27,000, the milestone was celebrated with a 27-meter-long Budapest roll.

== See also ==
- List of cakes
- Coffee bread in Swedish cuisine
