= Punsch-roll =

Swedish pastry

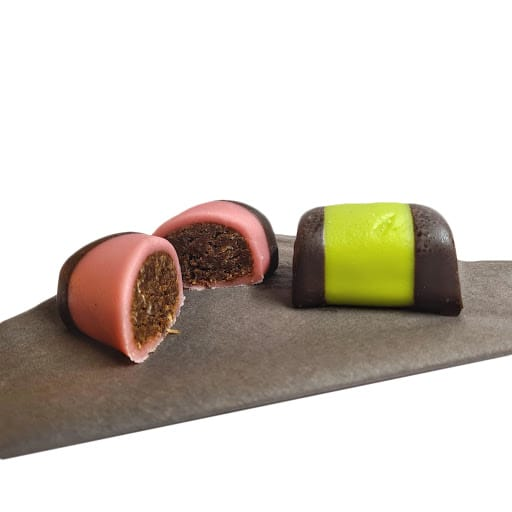
- A pink and traditionally green coloured punsch-roll.
- Alternative names: Dammsugare, arraksrulle
- Type: Pastry
- Place of origin: Sweden
- Main ingredients: green marzipan, chocolate, cake crumbs, biscuits, butter, cacao, punsch liqueur

Punsch-roll (Swedish: punschrulle) is a Swedish small cylindrical pastry covered with green marzipan with the ends dipped in chocolate, with an interior consisting of a mix of cake crumbs (and/or crushed biscuits), butter, and cocoa, flavoured with punsch liqueur. It has been popularised internationally through its sale in IKEA stores.

== Name ==
This pastry is often called dammsugare (lit. 'vacuum cleaner'), referring not only to its appearance, but also to the supposed practice of the pastry baker collecting crumbs from yesterday's cakes or biscuits for filling. Other names are arraksrulle (as arrak is an ingredient in punsch) and "150-ohmare" (lit. '150-ohmer'; because a brown-green-brown colour sequence on a resistor denotes a resistance value of 150 ohm).

== Similar pastries ==
The punschrulle has been popularised internationally, in part through its sale in IKEA stores. However, similar pastries existed in various countries long before its global distribution.

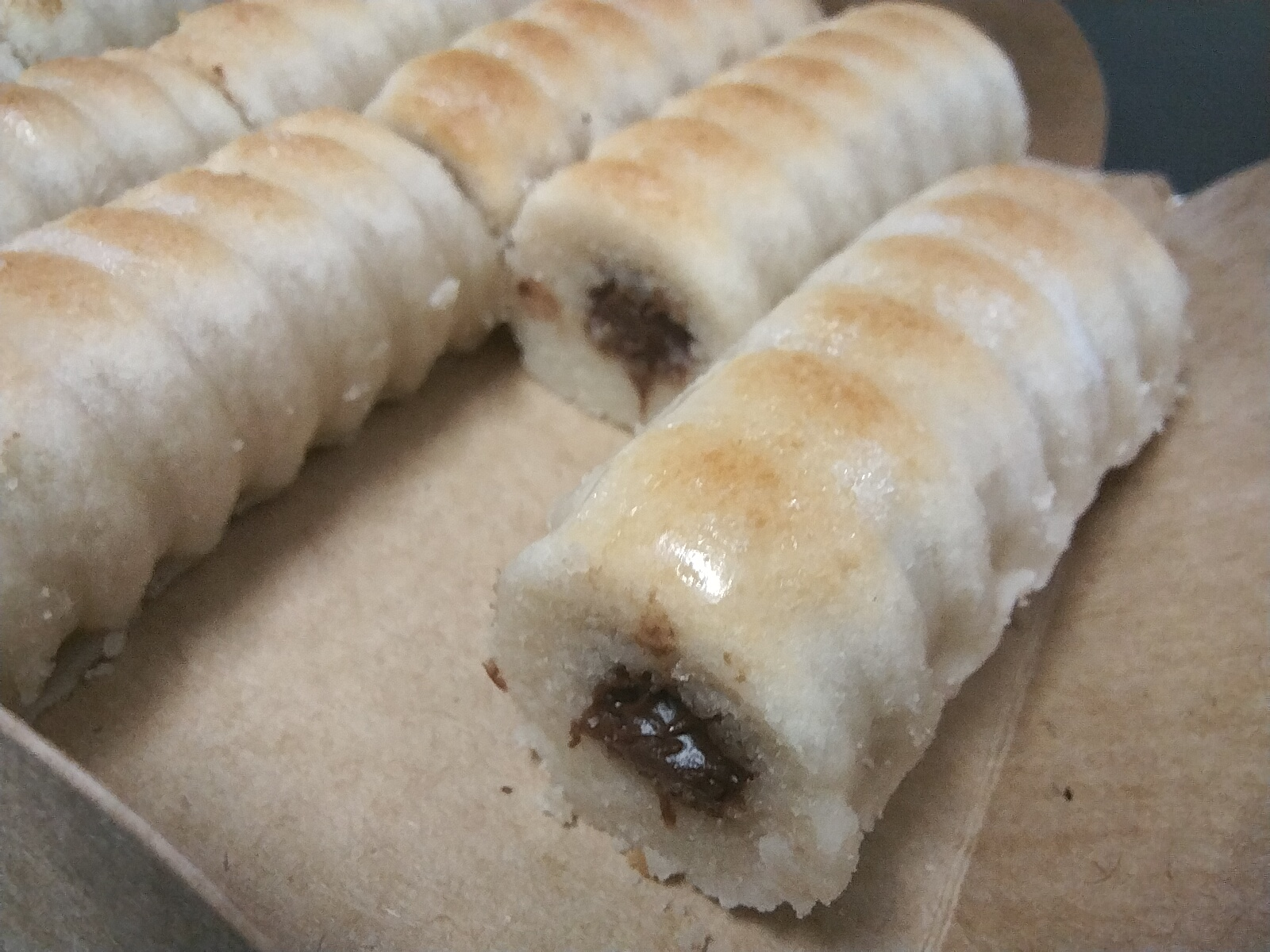
Spanish Huesitos de santos.

In Spain, huesos de santo (lit. 'saints' bones') have been prepared since at least the 17th century. These are marzipan cylinders filled with sweet egg yolk paste, bearing a resemblance in form but differing in ingredients and cultural context.

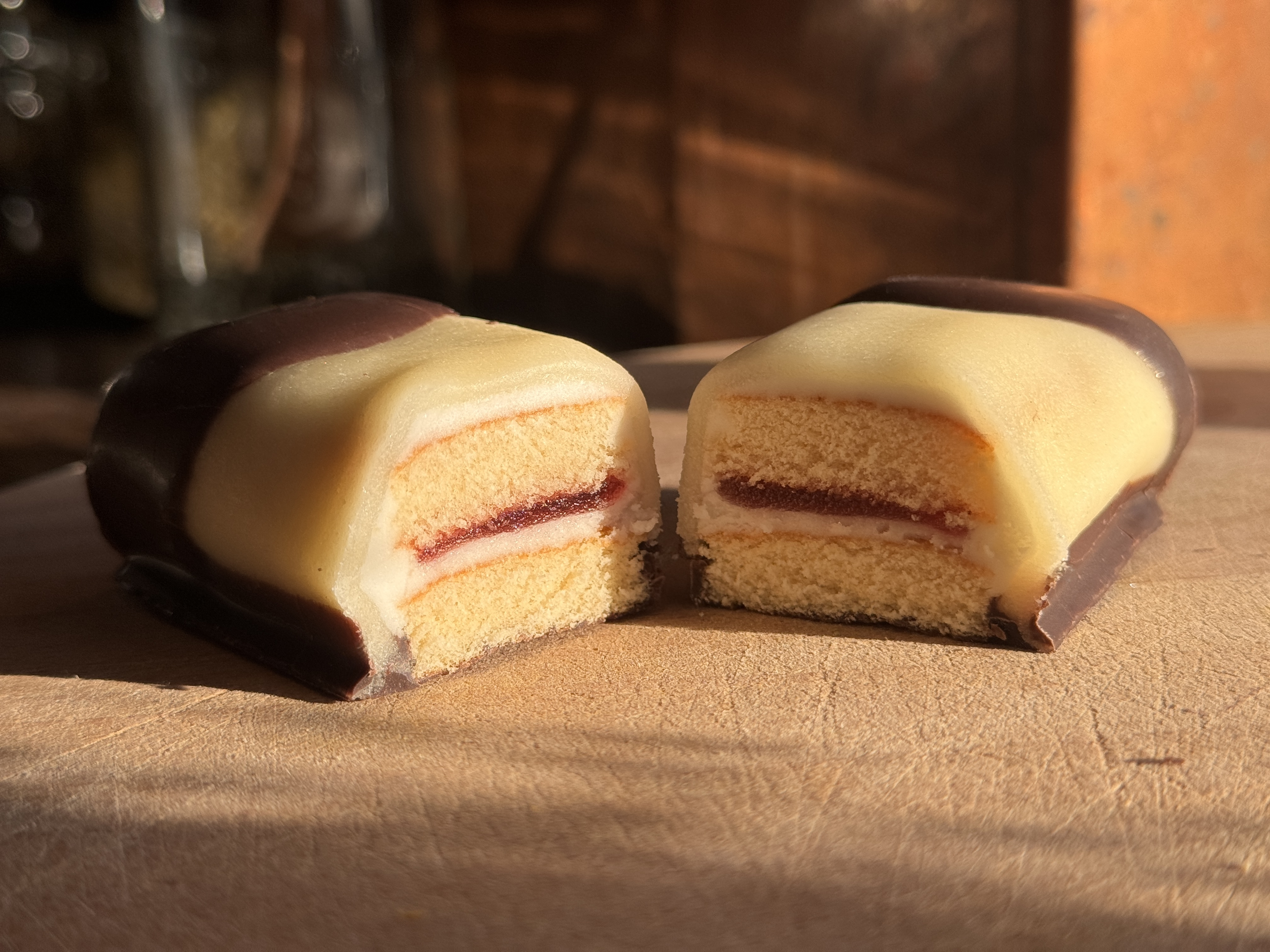
Dutch reuzemergpijp.

In the Netherlands, mergpijpje (lit. 'little marrowbone') has been known since at least the 19th century. It differs significantly in composition and flavour, typically consisting of a pale marzipan cover. It comes in two variants: a finger-sized variant with cream filling, and a large variant, reuzemergpijp ('giant marrowbone'), filled with cake, a layer of cream and sometimes also filled with a thin layer of berry jam.

A comparable pastry in Denmark is called træstamme (lit. 'tree trunk'), a traditional confection deeply rooted in Danish baking culture. Like the Swedish punschrulle, it is typically made from a mixture of leftover cake that is shaped into cylindrical logs and coated in chocolate, but it is usually not coloured green and often has rum added.

== See also ==
- Cookie butter
