= Nils Oscar Brewery =

Microbrewery in Nyköping, Sweden

Coordinates: 58.7478°N 17.0064°E

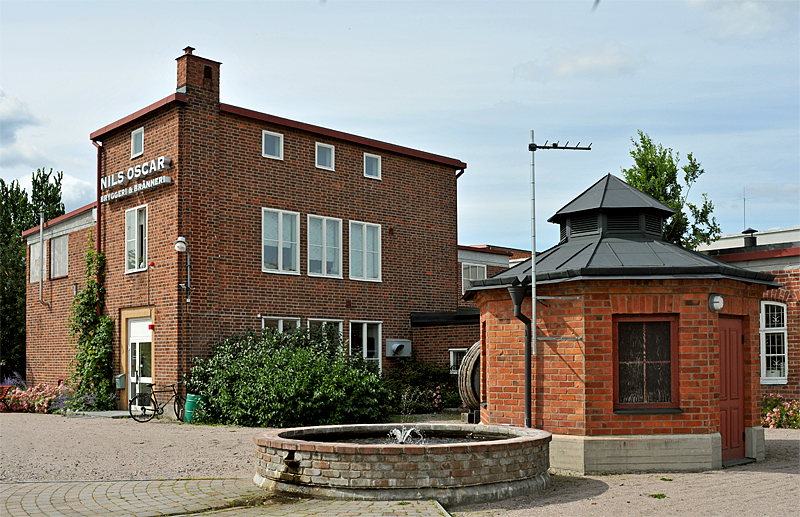
- Nils Oscar Brewery
- Location: Nyköping; Sweden
- Opened: 1996
- Owned by: Anna Sundberg, Karin Wikström & Maria af Jochnick (Independent)

Active beers
Name	Type
God Lager	Lager
India Ale	IPA
Södermalmspilsner	Pilsener
Imperial Stout	Stout

Seasonal beers
Name	Type
Kalasjulöl	Amber/Vienna Lager
Kalaspåsköl	Brown Ale

Nils Oscar Brewery is a Swedish microbrewery, malthouse and spirits company that is based in Nyköping, Sweden. It was founded in Stockholm 1996 as Kungsholmens Kvartersbryggeri i Kungsholmen, Stockholm but changed name to Tärnö Bryggeri in 2006.

Named after Nils Oscar, this establishment uses Oat, wheat, barley and rye to cultivate, malt, and brew beer and distilled spirits. It was the first Swedish craft brewery to launch a non-alcoholic beer in 2015.
