= Christmas in Sweden =

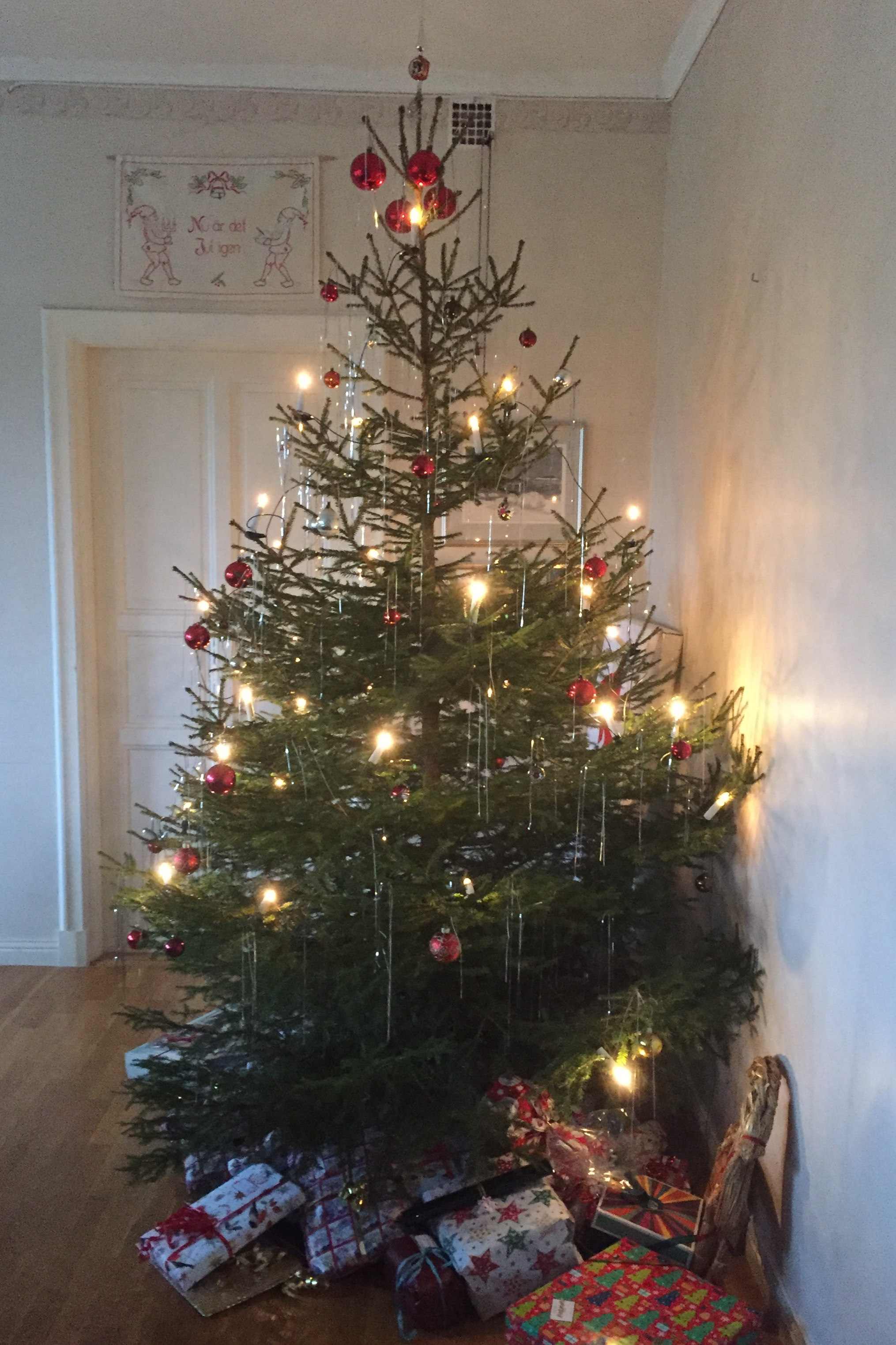
- Christmas tree in Sweden in 2017
- Observed by: Christians, as well as people of other religious alignments
- Liturgical color: White
- Date: 24 December
- Next time: 24 December 2026
- Frequency: annual

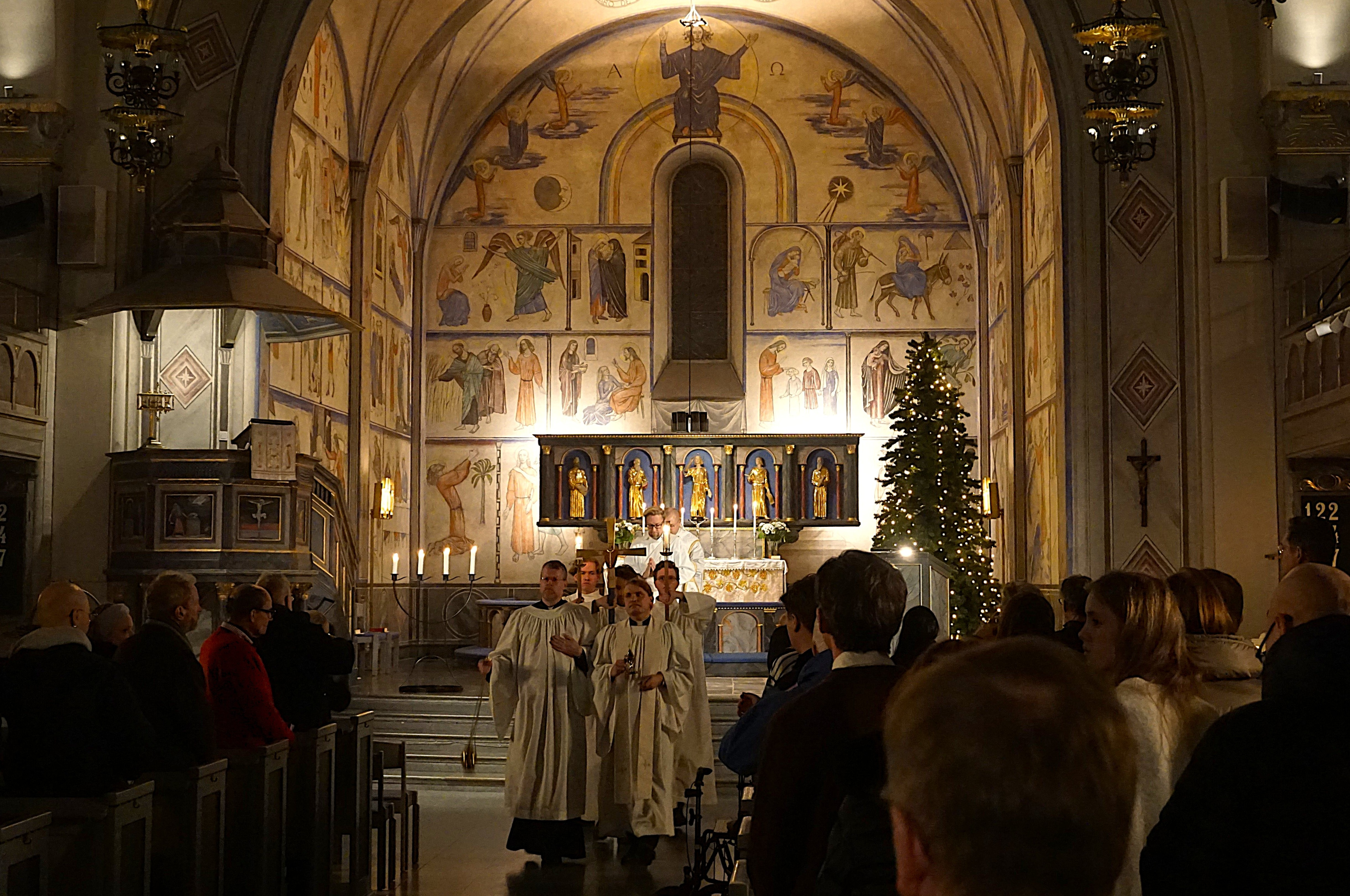
Midnight Mass being celebrated on Christmas Eve at St. Matthew's Evangelical-Lutheran Church in Stockholm, Sweden

Carl Larsson: «Nu är det jul igen» (akvarell, 1907)

Christmas (Swedish: jul, IPA: [ˈjʉːl]) is celebrated throughout December and traditionally until St. Knut's Day on January 13. The main celebration and the exchange of gifts in many families takes place on Christmas Eve, December 24; Swedes traditionally attend Midnight Mass on Christmas Eve or morning Christmas Day Mass in parishes of the Church of Sweden. The Feast of St. Lucy, celebrated during Advent, on December 13, is a major feast day celebrated by Evangelical-Lutherans prior to the arrival of Christmastide.

Christmas contains a mix of domestic and foreign customs that have been adapted. Many Swedes celebrate Christmas in roughly the same way, and many local customs and specialities have disappeared.

== History ==
The origin of the Germanic word "Jul" is somewhat unclear. Around the year 600, it is mentioned in the Gothic calendar together with Christian religious texts. Around the year 900, the word "Jul" can be found in a tribute to king Harald Fairhair, in which someone is said to "Dricka Jul" (Drink Jul). The pretext for the Jul celebration was to mark the winter solstice when the days start to get longer and the nights shorter again.

In Nordic prehistoric times there was a "midvinterblot" rite (mid-winter blót), which was a sacrificial rite held in mid-winter, which may either mean the same time as Jul (in later sources called julablot), or in mid-January which was in the middle of the winter period. The people sacrificed cattle and perhaps humans, to win the Æsir's blessing on the germinating crop. The ás (singular of Æsir) who was especially hailed at this time was Odin, who commonly went by the name of "Jólner". The Jul was Christianized, while the blót rites were forbidden and abandoned when Sweden became a Christian country.

The celebration of Christmas at the end of December is a very old tradition with many origins. Among these is the Old Norse Christmas celebration – which was prevailing in Scandinavia in the 11th century – and was celebrated in connection with the midwinter offering celebration. Moreover, there is the Christian Christmas celebration in memory of the birth of Jesus Christ.

In the Old Norse sources the pagan celebration of Jul in the Nordic countries is often described as "to drink jul/yule". The central aspect of the pagan Germanic celebration of midwinter was to eat and drink well. To bake and to produce ale and mead were important preparations for the celebration. In medieval wooden calendars and pre-Christian picture stones, this celebration is still symbolised by a barrel of ale, or a drinking horn. So the emphasis on food and drink traditions was originally a pagan trait of the Christmas celebration.

The Christmas tree is a custom that was imported from Germany in the 1880s. The former tradition of giving joke presents, often a log of wood, was replaced during the late 19th century and 20th century by Christmas gifts given out by the Christmas goat (Julbocken) or, especially later, Santa Claus (Jultomten).

== Traditions ==
=== The month of December ===
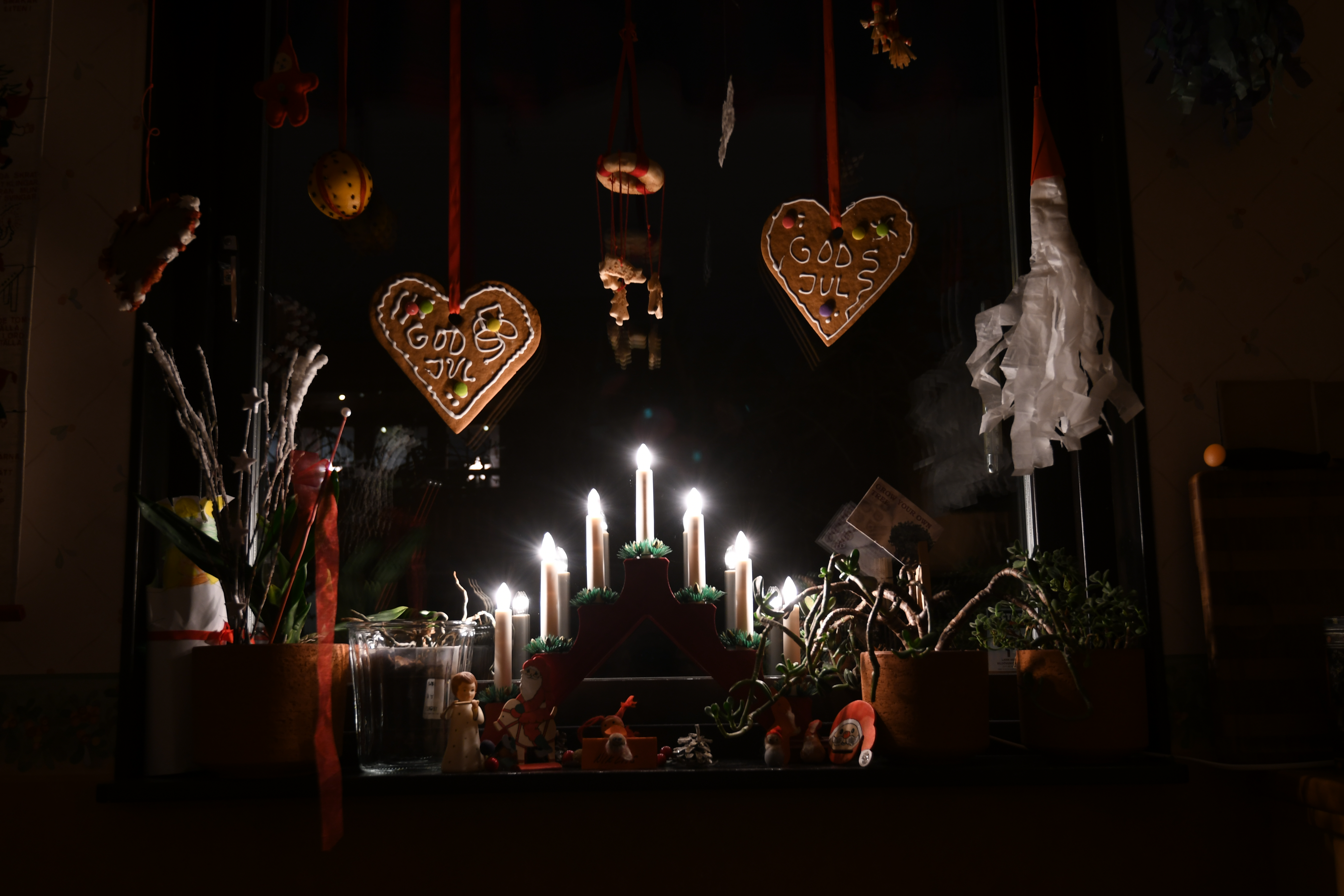
Advent lights and Christmas decorations in a Swedish window

The Christmas celebrations in Sweden usually starts with the first Advent in the end of November. However Christmas decorations and julmust might go on sale in stores much earlier, often directly after All Saints Day. At this time many people start to plan their Christmas and start buying gifts. On December 1, the first episode of the Christmas calendar airs on television and radio. The 13th of December is Lucia where most of the children and some adults dress up and have processions in preschool, school and companies. The third and fourth Advent is important for many families as many preparations are done then. Baking and cooking are common activities.

Many preschools and schools start their Christmas vacation between December 17 to 22. Many workplaces start the vacation later, between December 20 and 23. The start of the vacation depends on what day of the week Christmas Eve is on. The last days before Christmas Eve, between December 20 and 23, the greatest preparations are made, including preparing most of the food, buying and decorating the Christmas tree and wrapping presents. During the last days there are usually many people in stores and shopping malls to buy items for the Christmas celebrations.

After Christmas Eve there are two public holidays: juldagen (Christmas Day) and annandag jul (Boxing Day). Most of the families have holiday and are free from work, but some workplaces can start the work again in the days before New Year's Eve. After the New Year's Eve the schools usually have at least a week before the spring term starts, but workplaces often start the work again a couple of days after the new year.

Many Swedes visit the service on Advent Sunday, the Midnight Mass on December 24 or the Christmas Matins in the early hours of Christmas Day (Julotta).

=== Christmas tree ===
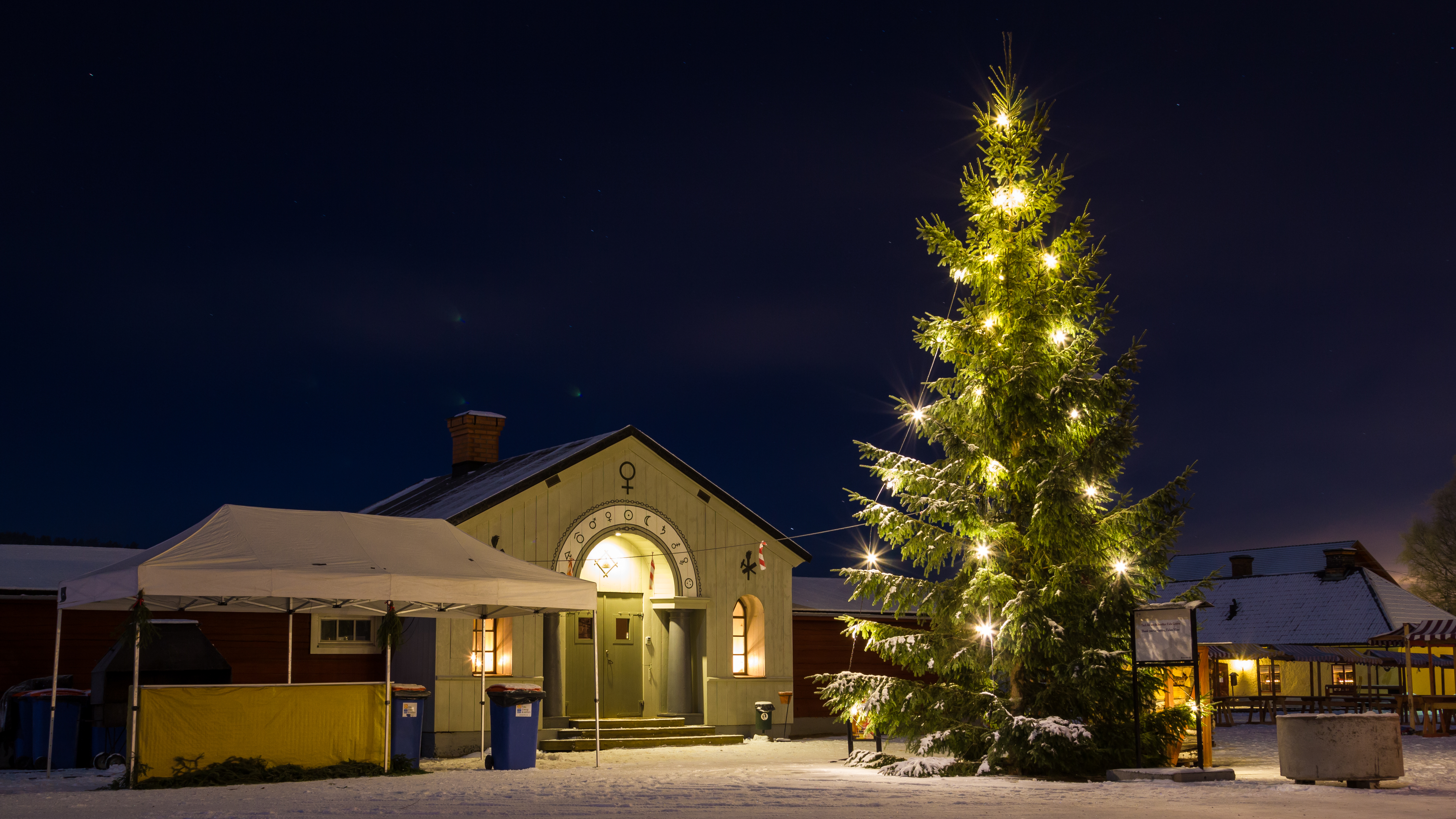
A Swedish Christmas tree, outdoors

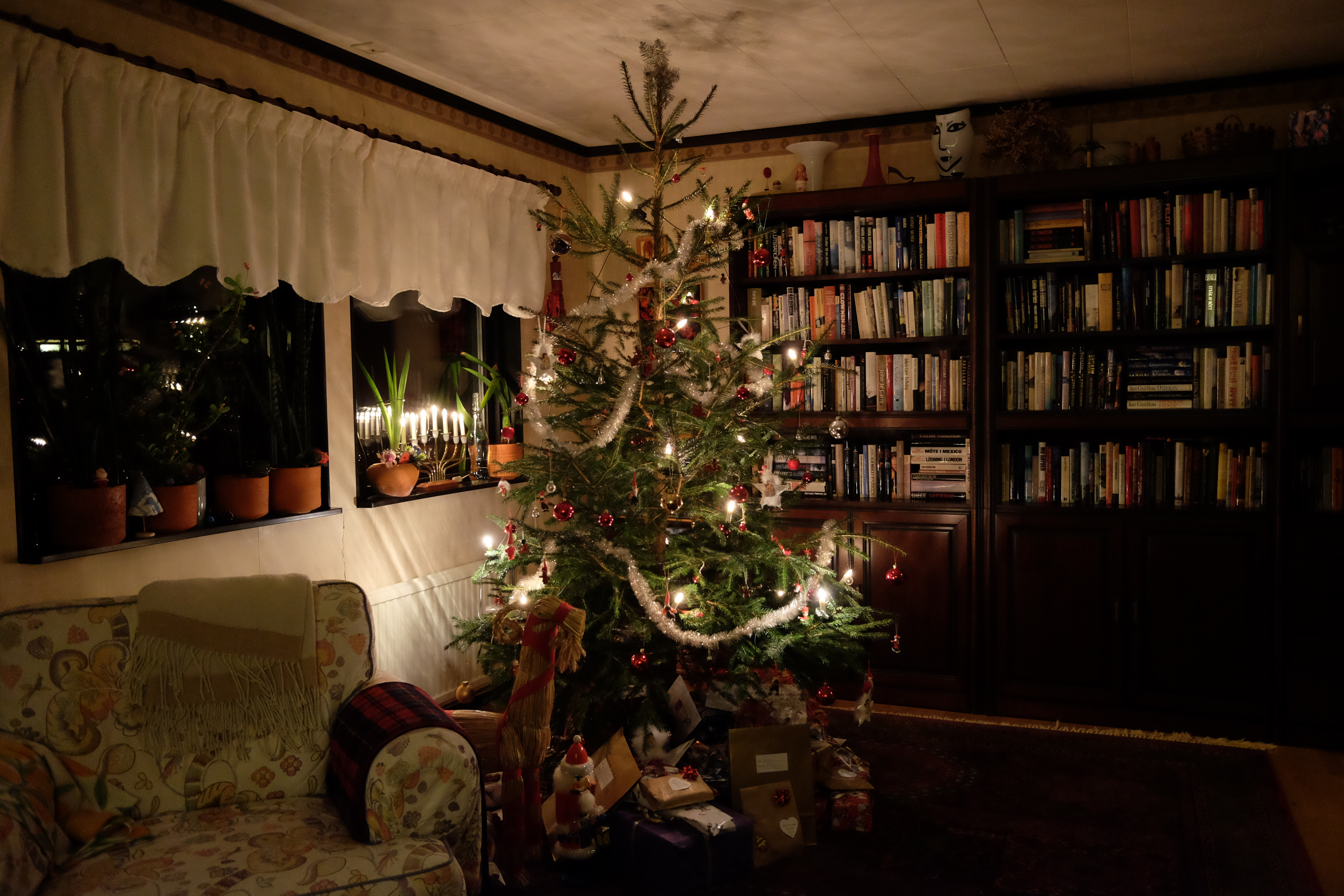
A Swedish Christmas tree, indoors, and a Yule goat

The story of the Christmas tree originated in Holy Roman Empire (Germany) in the 16th century. During the 17th and 18th centuries the Christmas tree started being dressed with candles. The first Swedish Christmas trees were generally decorated with live candles and treats such as fruit and candy. Apples were often hung on the branches where the candles were located to make them more parallel to the ground.

It soon became more common for families to make their own decorations with paper and straw. Some families preferred to build a Ljuskrona decorated with cut paper. From around 1880, commercial Christmas tree decorations were readily available in larger Swedish cities, the finest of which were imported from Germany. The day that people in Sweden buy and dress their Christmas tree varies greatly from family to family, but most have them dressed on 13 December and throw them out by 13 January. Commonly used decorations today include: baubles, candles, apples, Swedish flags, small gnomes, and straw ornaments. The house may be filled with red tulips and the smell of pepparkakor – a heart-star, or goat-shaped gingerbread biscuits.

St. Knut's Day (13 January) marks the end of the Swedish Christmas and holiday season. Children, especially, may celebrate it with a Knut's party.

=== Jultomten ===
Jultomten, or just tomten, is the being who brings the gifts at Julafton (the evening of December 24). The gifts are called julklappar, and are probably a modern version of the Yule log. Jultomten does not climb down the chimney, he delivers the gifts in person. This task is often performed by an old man who secretly dresses up as Jultomten and knocks at the door with a sack of gifts.

The origin of the modern Jultomte is a hybridisation between the pre-Christian being called Tomte and the (originally Dutch) Santa Claus. A Tomte is mostly portrayed as a small, gnomelike spirit being who lives on a farm and takes care of it (or the family) while the farmer family are asleep. He might be a gift giver if the farmers treat him and the livestock correctly. The tomte is an echo of ancient ancestral cult. It is thought that the tomte was considered a spirit of previous generations at the homestead, and there are references to them following the family/clan, when they move. Despite its different cultural roots, the Jultomte (Tomte of Jul) is today portrayed similarly to the commonly known image of Santa Claus.

=== Julotta ===
In Sweden, many people attend a traditional early morning church service called Julotta on Christmas Day (December 25). The service is held before sunrise, typically around 7 AM. Historically, people would travel to church in horse-drawn sleighs through the snowy landscape. Although church attendance has declined in modern Sweden, Julotta remains an important tradition for many families, particularly in rural areas.

=== Tjugondag Knut ===
Christmas celebrations in Sweden officially end on Tjugondag Knut (St. Knut’s Day) on January 13. On this day, families remove Christmas decorations and throw out the Christmas tree in a festivity known as Julgransplundring (Christmas tree plundering). Children often get to eat the last remaining candy decorations from the tree, and in some households, small parties are held to mark the conclusion of the holiday season.

=== Food and drink ===
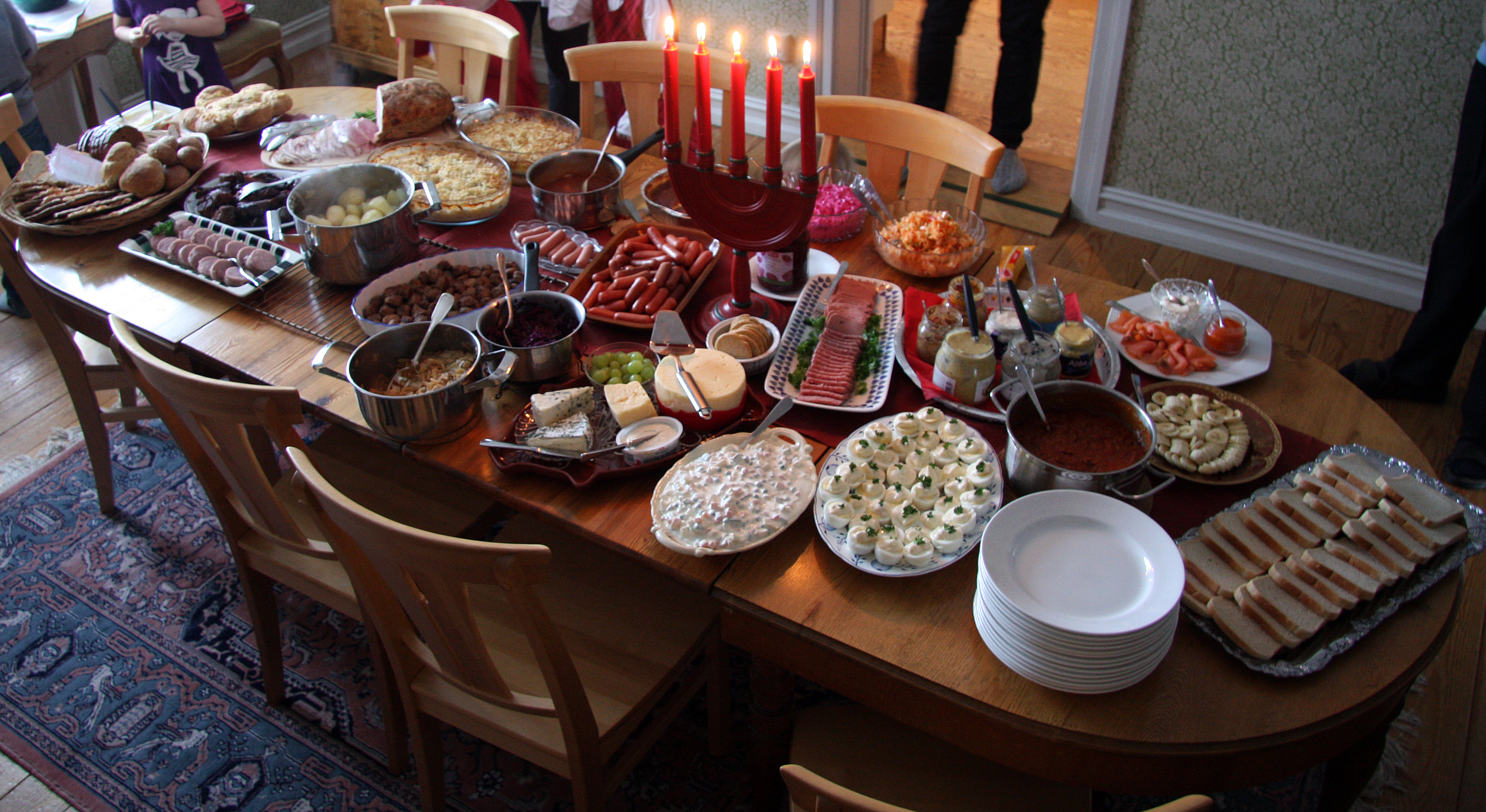
Christmas food, with Christmas ham, Janssons frestelse, meatballs, prinskorv, red cabbage etc.

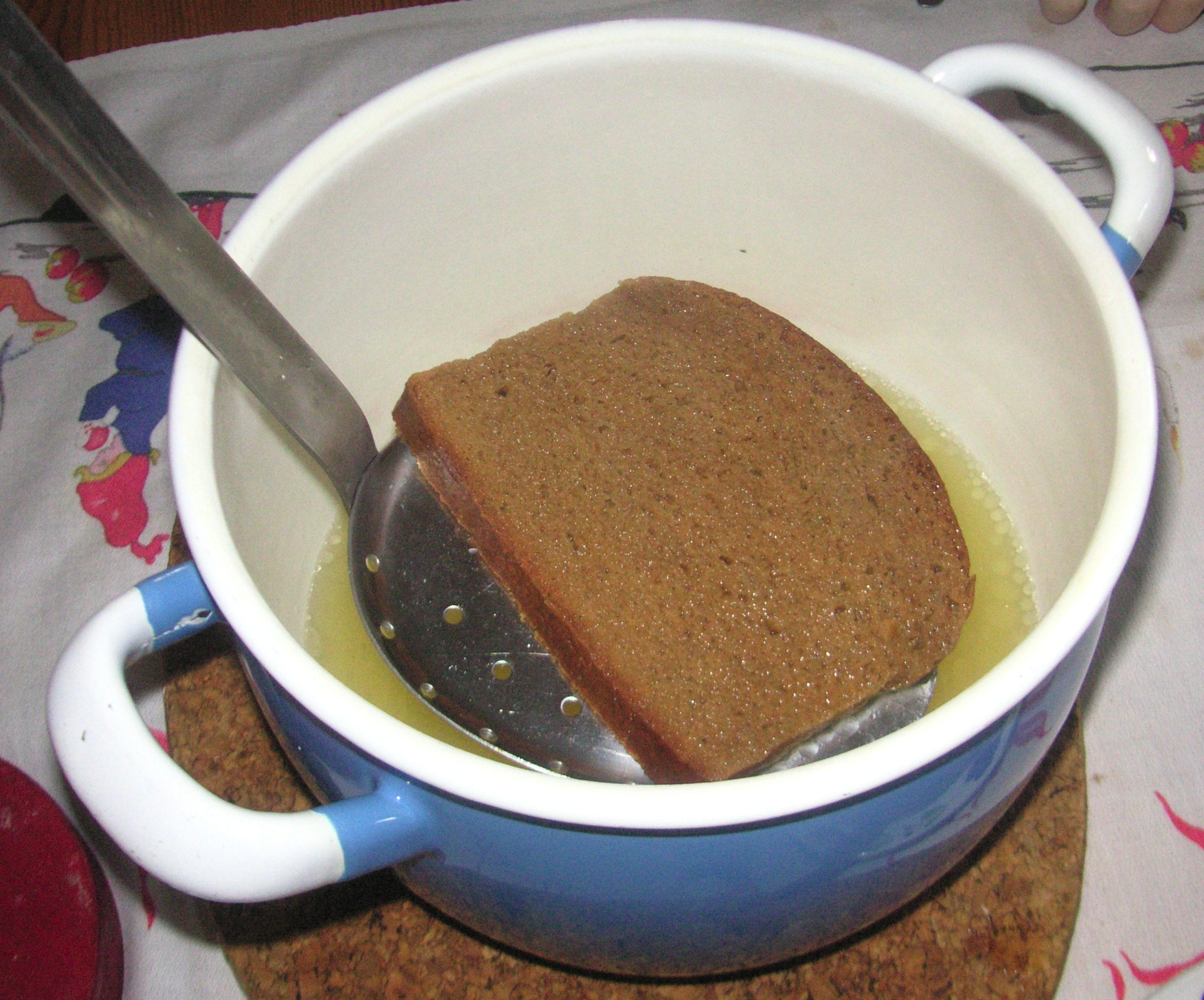
Dopp i grytan

The foods served in Sweden during Christmastime differ per region. But here, too, homogenisation has set in, due in no small part to the uniform offerings of the department stores and the ready availability of convenience foods. Few have time to salt their own hams or stuff their own pork sausages nowadays.

The traditional main meal on Christmas Eve is a smorgasbord called julbord which has been prepared with all the classic dishes. A good quality restaurant would typically serve more than fifty (or even a hundred) different dishes at a julbord. A family-julbord being much smaller.

A traditional julbord is typically eaten buffet style in five to seven courses (depending on local and family traditions).

The first three courses are usually fish-courses. The first plate is an assortment of different pickled herrings served with sour cream and chives. The second is a variety of cold fish, particularly several kinds of lox (e.g. gravlax). And the third plate is hot fish-dishes – particularly lutfisk. Other traditional dishes would be (smoked) eel, rollmops, herring salad, baked herring, smoked salmon, smoked char and shellfish canapés, accompanied by sauces and dips.

The fourth course is often a selection of cold sliced meats, the most important cold cut being the Christmas ham (julskinka) with mustard. Other traditional cuts include smoked sausages, leverpastej, wild game cuts, smoked leg of lamb (fårfiol), pâtés and several types of brawn (sylta). It is also common to serve the cold meats with sliced cheese, pickled cucumbers and soft (vörtbröd) and crisp breads.

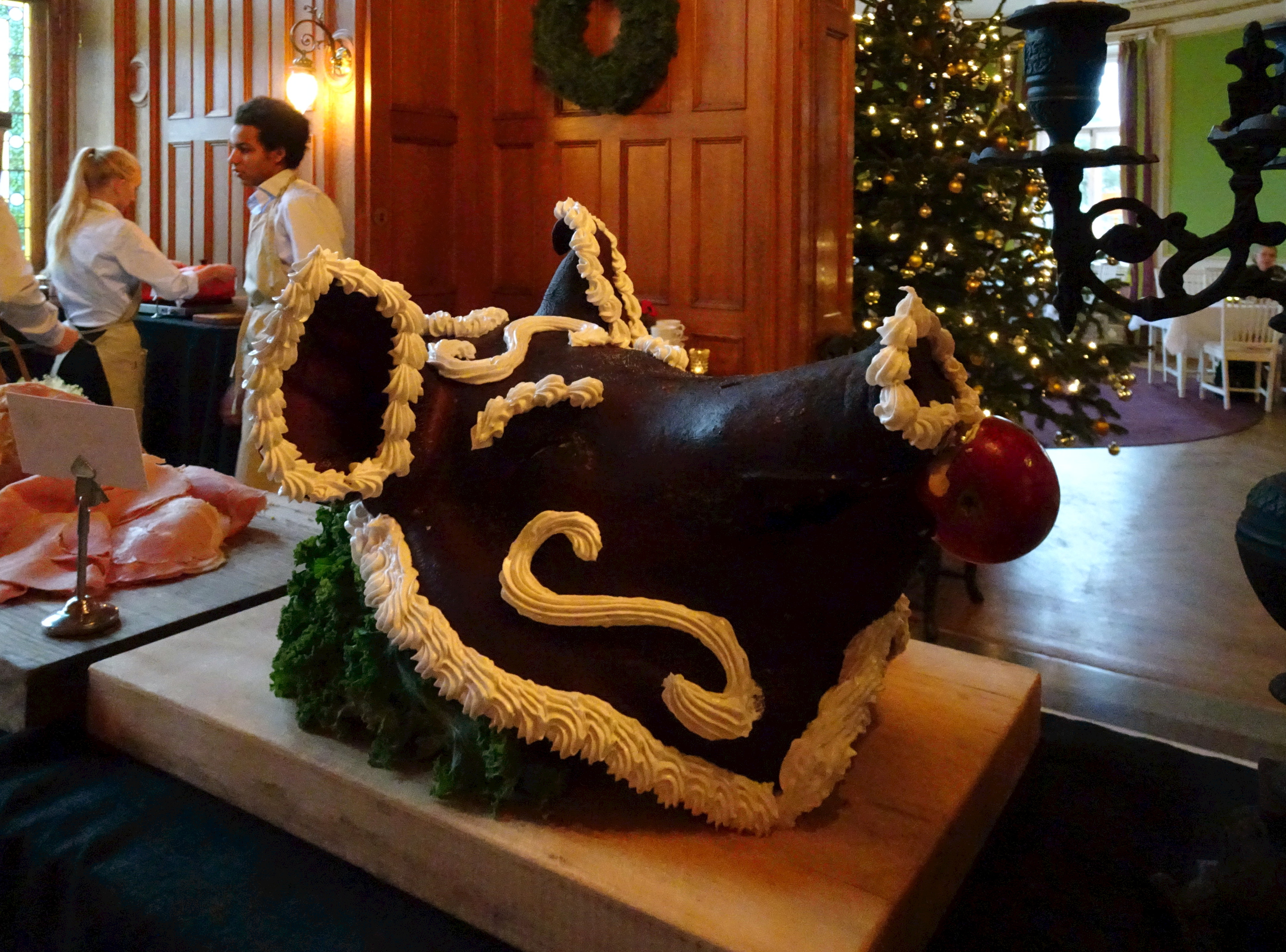
A decorated pig's head is often seen at more luxurious julbord

The fifth course would be warm dishes (småvarmt). Traditionally, the fifth course begins with soaking bread in the stock from the Christmas ham, which is called dopp i grytan. Warm dishes include Swedish meatballs (köttbullar), small fried hot dog sausages (prinskorv), roasted pork ribs (revbensspjäll), pork sausages (fläskkorv), potato sausages (potatiskorv), and Janssons frestelse (literally "Jansson's Temptation") – a warm potato casserole, matchstick potatoes layered with cream, onion and sprats. Side dishes include beetroot salad in mayonnaise and warm stewed red, green or brown cabbage and boiled potatoes.

The sixth and seventh course is a cheese plate and a dessert plate. Julbord cheeses include stilton, cheddar, västerbottenost and Christmas edammer. Desserts include rosettes (struvor), klenäts (klenäter), polkagrisar, knäck, dates, figs, ischoklad, saffron buns, mandelmusslor, gingerbread cookies, marzipan figures, different kinds of nuts, risalamande and most importantly rice pudding (risgrynsgröt) sprinkled with cinnamon powder. Traditionally, an almond is hidden in the bowl of rice pudding and whoever finds it receives a small prize or is recognised for having good luck.

A julbord often also include local and family specialties. Among them are isterband, baked beans, omelette with shrimps or mushrooms covered with béchamel sauce, äggost, saffranspannkaka, långkål, rörost, ostkaka, kroppkakor and julgädda.

Beer and the occasional snaps, brännvin or akvavit are common beverages to this Christmas meal. The seasonal soft drink julmust is also served at the julbord, as well as during the whole Christmas holiday.

The Christmas ham is either boiled or broiled and then painted and glazed with a mixture of egg, breadcrumbs and mustard.

Lutfisk, lyed fish made of stockfish (dried ling or cod), is served with boiled potato, thick white sauce or mustard sauce, green peas and sometimes cubed bacon. More and more families opt to eat Lutfisk as dinner the day before or after Christmas Eve rather than as a dish among other at the Julbord.

While the julbord is meant to be eaten in several courses a lot of swedes simply mixes the different dishes they like. One reason for this is that many families only prepare a small julbord with "just the essentials".

Julbord is served from early December until just before Christmas at restaurants and until Epiphany in some homes. Mulled wine glögg, gingerbread cookies and saffron buns are served throughout December.

== Television ==
An important tradition for many Swedes is watching the Walt Disney Productions 1958 christmas special From All of Us to All of You, in Swedish entitled Kalle Anka och hans vänner önskar God Jul ("Donald Duck and His Friends Wish You a Merry Christmas"), which have been aired by Sveriges Television on Christmas Eve every year since 1960. The show is one of the most popular television events of the year, with typically about 40 to 50 per cent of the Swedish population watching.

Another popular tradition on Christmas Eve is watching the animated film Sagan om Karl-Bertil Jonssons julafton ("The Tale of Karl-Bertil Jonsson's Christmas Eve") by Tage Danielsson and Per Åhlin, that tells the tale of a boy who steals Christmas gifts from the wealthy to give to the poor people of Stockholm while working in a post office on Christmas Eve, which have been aired by Sveriges Television since 1975.

The declaration of the Christmas Peace in Turku, Finland, is broadcast on Swedish television since 1986. Since it takes place at 12:00 local time, it is shown at 11:00 in Sweden.

== Gallery ==
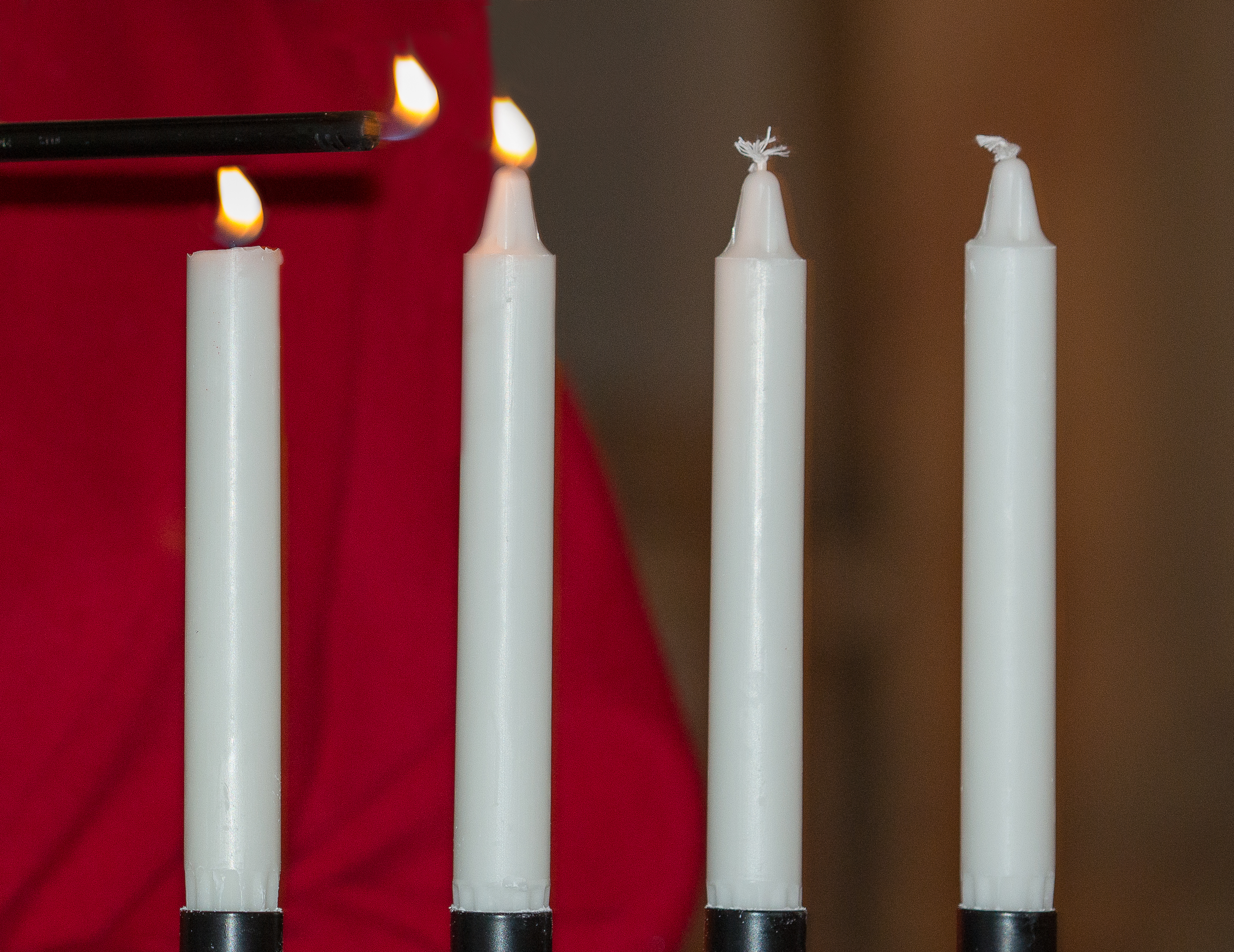
Second Advent before Christmas

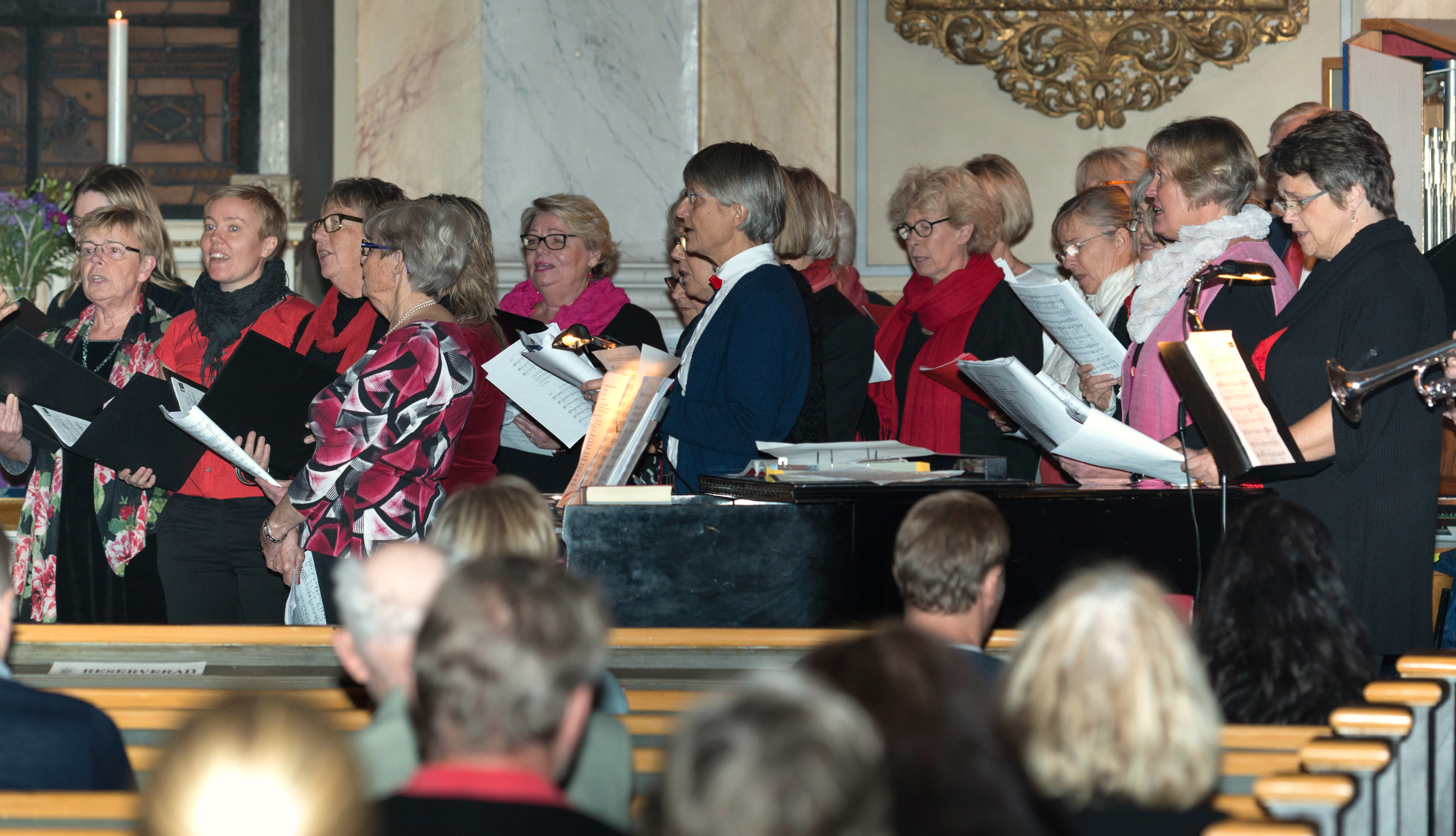
Second Advent in church

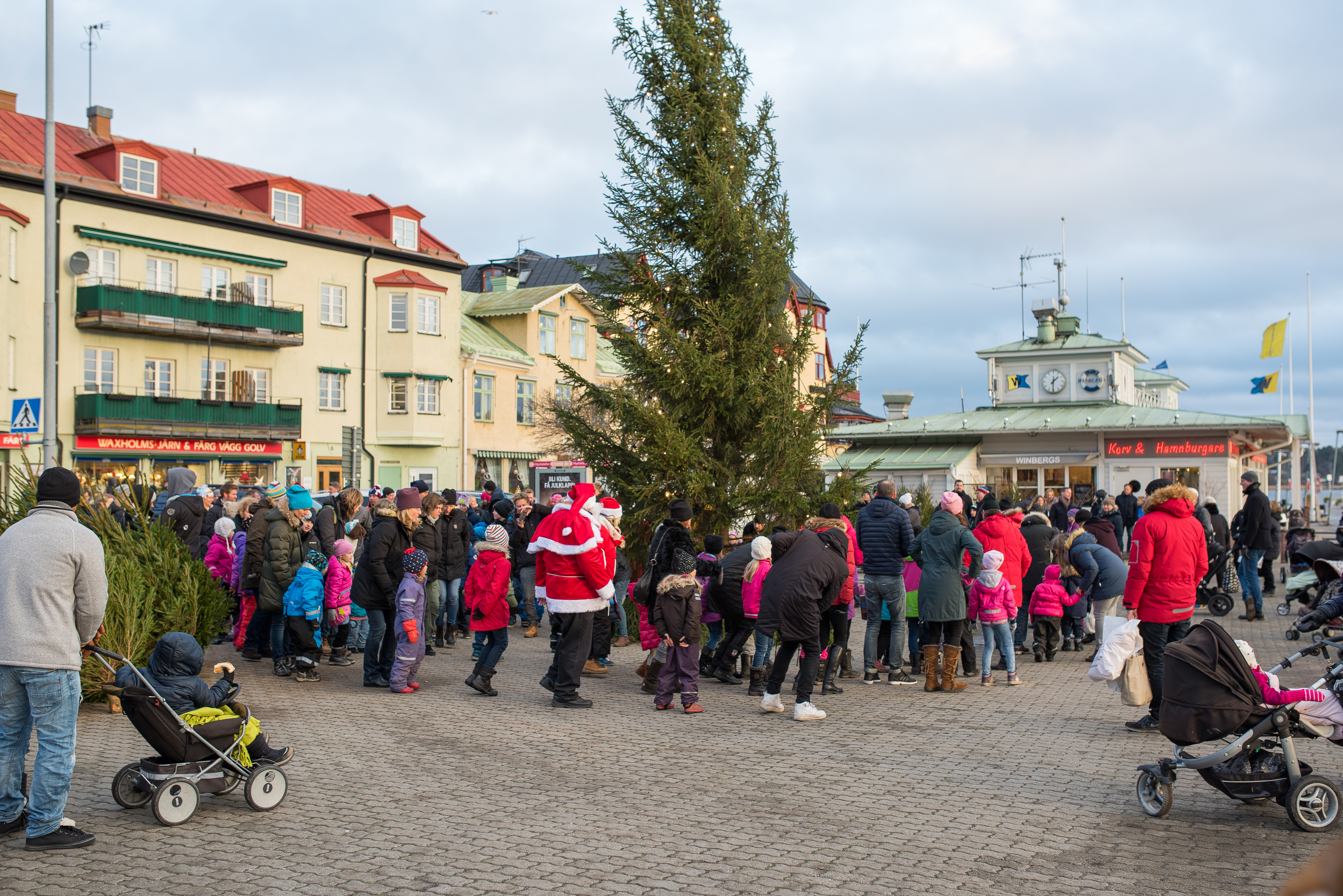
Christmas Market

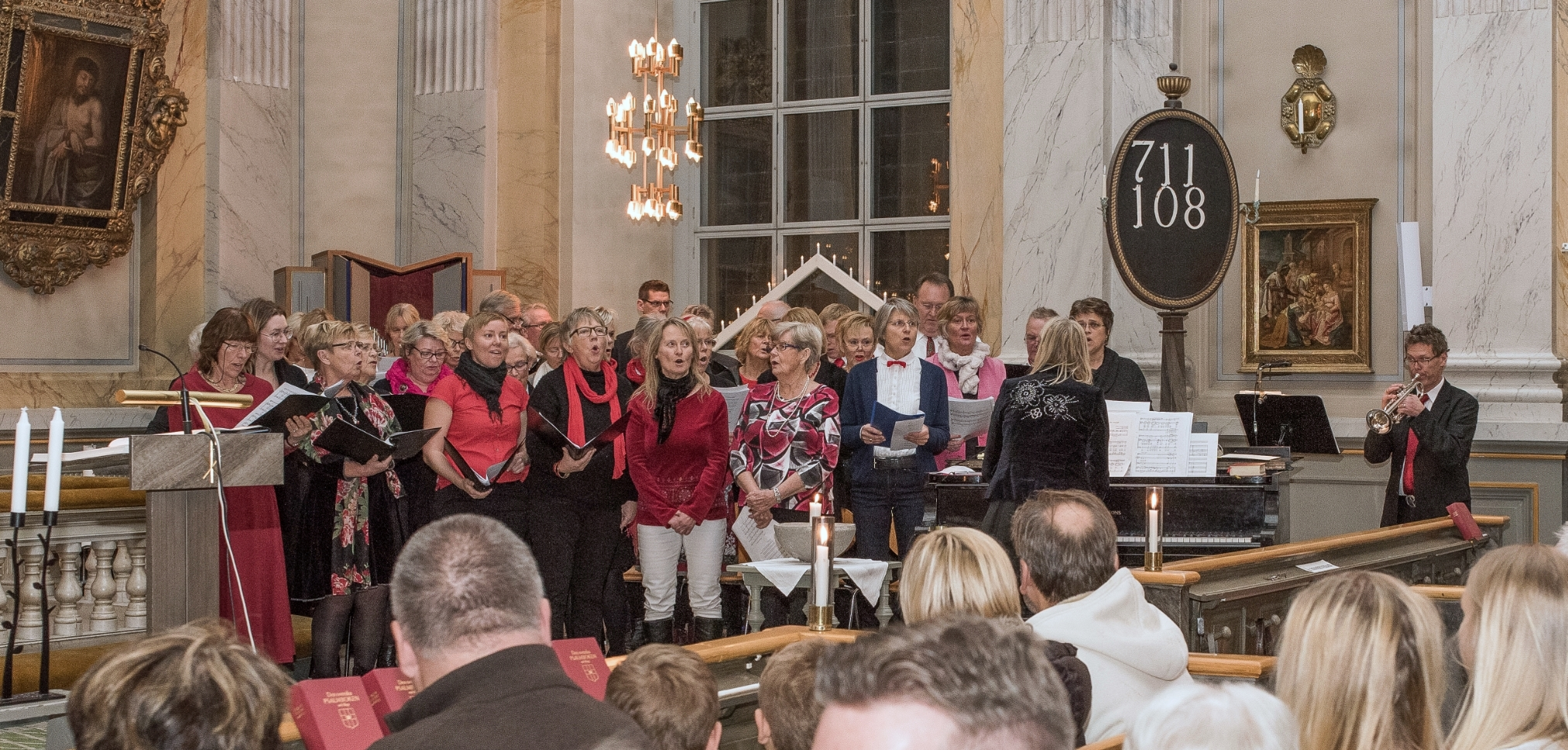
Second Advent in church

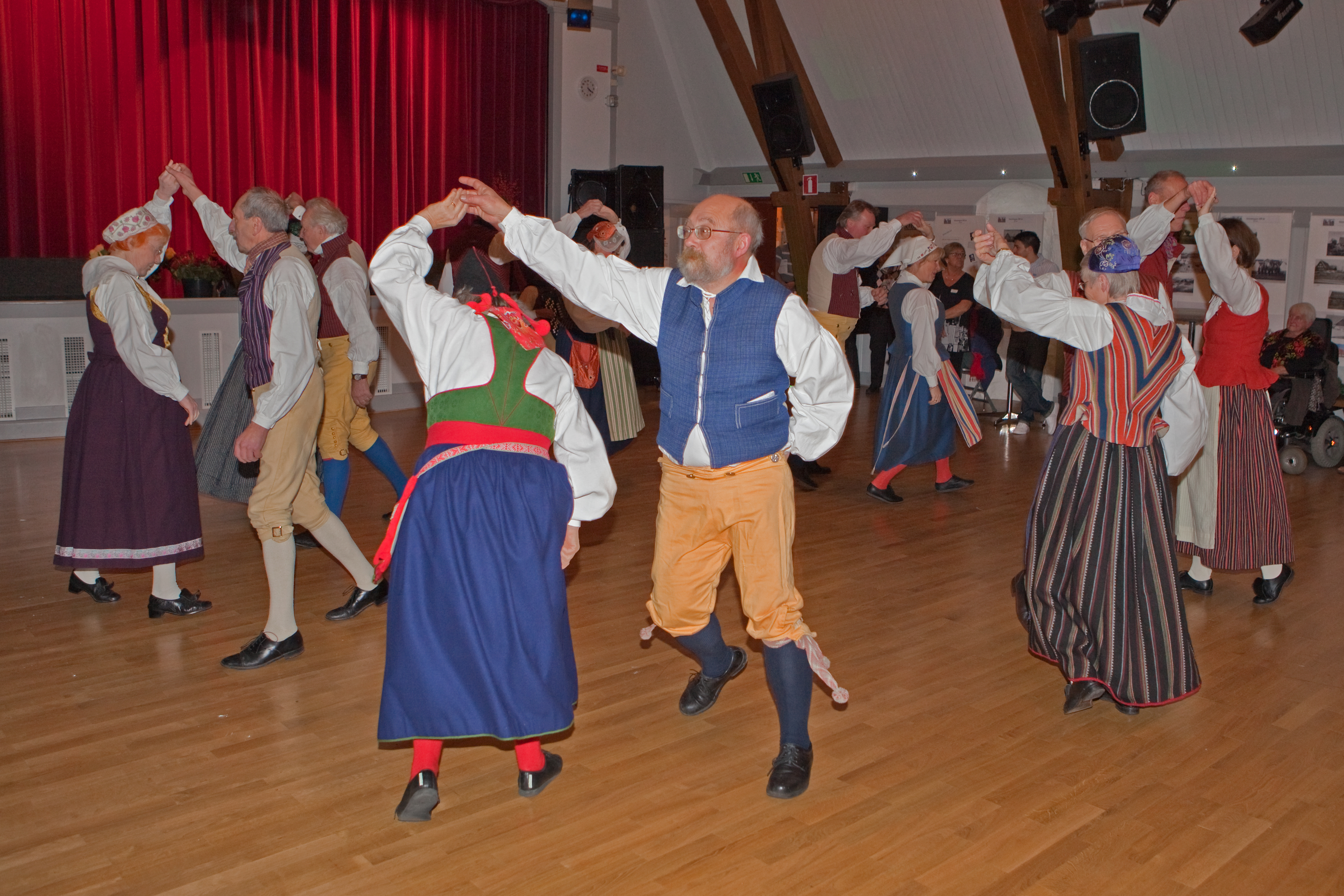
Christmas

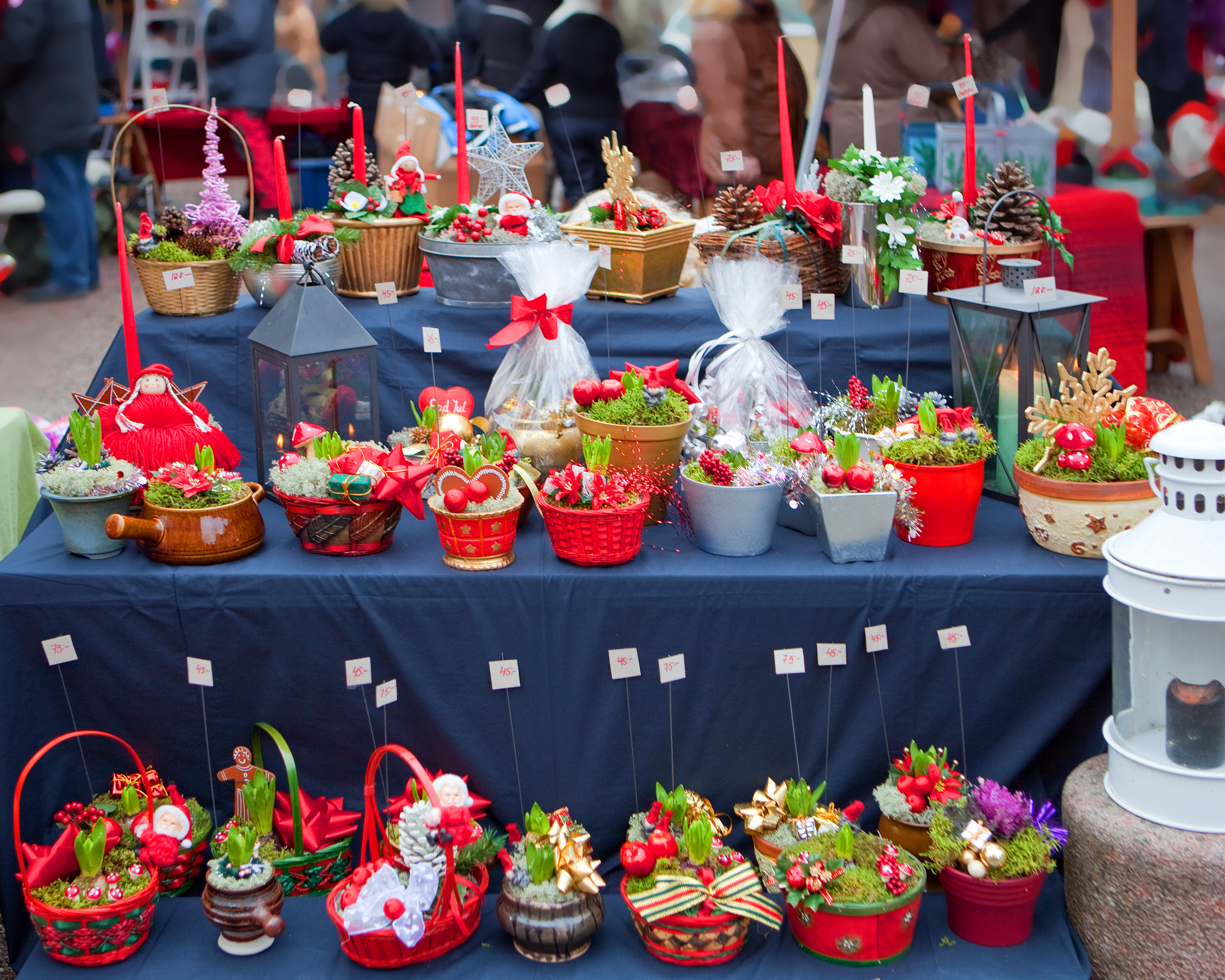
Christmas Market flowers

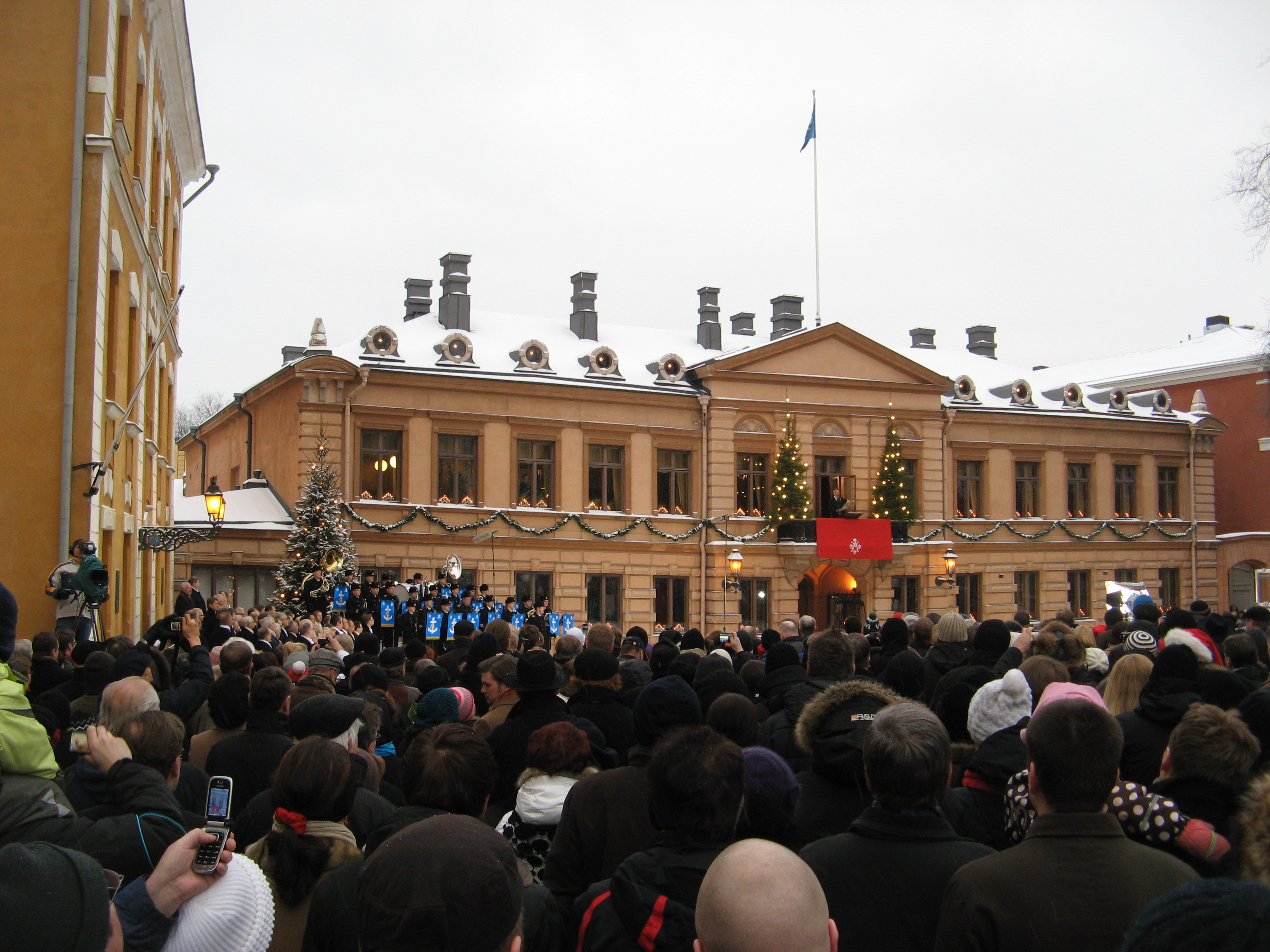
Christmas Peace is declared in Turku, Finland

== See also ==
- Christmas worldwide
- Yule and Christmas in Denmark
- Christmas in Finland
- Christmas in Iceland
- Christmas in Norway
