= Jól =

Jól may refer to:

- Yule, which in Old Norse is 'Jól'
- Christmas in Iceland, where 'Christmas' in Icelandic is 'Jól'
