= Christmas in Norway =

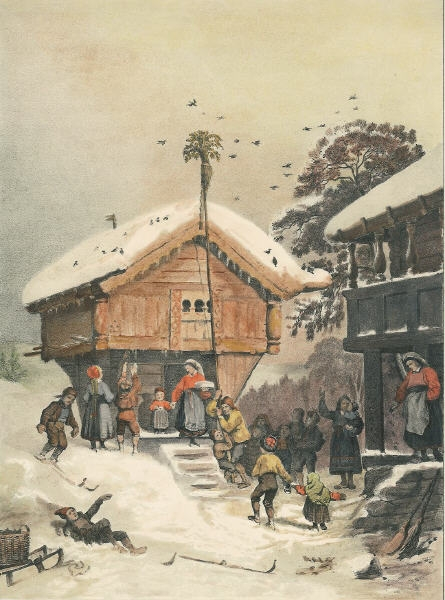
1846 painting by Adolph Tidemand illustrating Norwegian Christmas traditions

Jul or jol ([jʉːɽ]) is the term used for the Christmas holiday season in Scandinavia and parts of Scotland. Originally, jul was the name of a month in the old Germanic calendar. The concept of jul as a period of time rather than a specific event prevailed in Scandinavia; in modern times, jul is a period of time stretching from the fourth Sunday before Christmas Eve, December 24, to (traditionally) mid-January at the date of Epiphany with the month of December and Christmas, and the week up to the New Year, as its highlight. The modern English yule and yuletide are cognates with this term.

The term jul is common throughout Norway, Sweden, Denmark, Iceland, Greenland, Scotland and the Faroe Islands.

The modern day celebration is largely based on the Church year. Whereas the start of jul proper is announced by the chiming of church bells throughout the country in the afternoon of 24 December, it is more accurate to describe the season as an eight-week event. It consists of five phases: Advent, julaften, romjul, nyttår, and The End of Christmas, very often with Epiphany, the thirteenth day of Christmastide, as the final day of the season. From the original beginning on Christmas Day, the custom of Julebord has spread to the entire season and beyond, often beginning well in advance of December.

The central event in Scandinavia is Christmas Eve (julaften), when the main Christmas meal is served and gifts are exchanged. This might be due to the old Germanic custom of counting time in nights, not days (e.g. fortnight), as it holds for other holidays like Midsummer Eve (Jonsok, lit. 'Wake of St. John') and St. Olav's Mass (Olsok, lit. 'Wake of St. Olav'), with the main celebration on the eve of the official feast day.

== Common customs ==
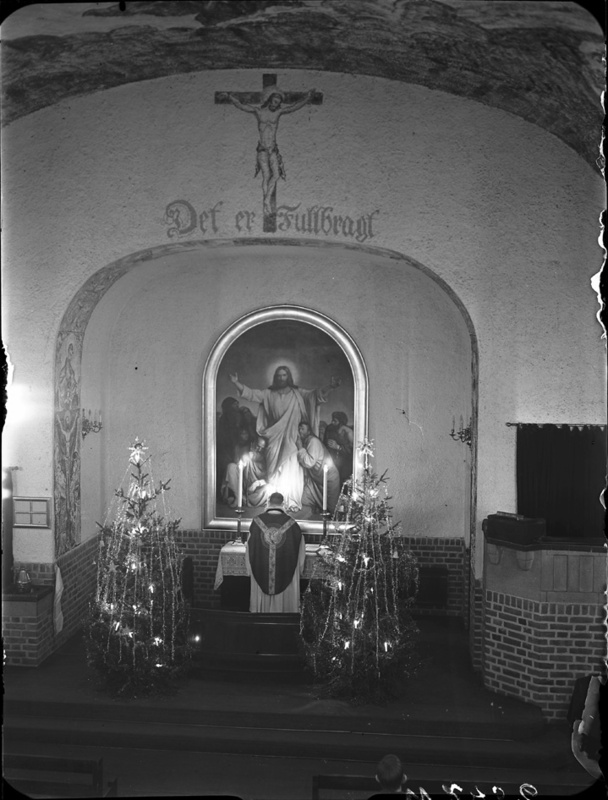
The Holy Mass being celebrated ad orientem by an Evangelical-Lutheran priest on Christmas Day in Norway (1942)

As usual in the western world, Christmas features Midnight Mass in parishes of the Church of Norway, Christmas dinner, decorated Christmas trees and the exchange of gifts. Gifts are brought by Julenissen ('Christmas Hob' or 'the Christmas Wight', who today appears identical to Santa Claus).

Remnants of customs from the older agrarian society include decoration with boughs of green from spruce or fir, e.g. on the doormat, and a sheaf of wheat (julenek) hung outside.

== Food ==
Culinary traditions vary regionally. In Northern and Western Norway, pinnekjøtt (ribs of mutton which are salted and dried, and some places also smoked, and then steamed) is a common dish, whereas lutefisk and cod are popular in Southern Norway. In Eastern Norway and Central Norway, pork rib roast is common, usually served with medisterkaker and medisterpølser (meatballs and sausages made of minced pork meat with suet). Turkey has recently made its way into the variety of cuisines enjoyed during jul.

Other traditional foods are eaten at første juledags frokost, a Christmas Day luncheon where the household serves all available delicacies in a grand buffet. Families might serve several kinds of meat such as ham, fenalår (leg of lamb), cooked cured leg of lamb, pickled pigs' trotters, head cheese, mutton roll, pork roll, or ox tongue; and several kinds of fish such as smoked salmon, gravlax, rakfisk, and pickled herring. There will also be a range of cheeses and various types of jam. After the meal, tradition prescribes serving seven kinds of julebakst, pastries and coffee breads associated with the holiday. Gingerbread and gingerbread houses are commonly decorated with sugar frosting. In some instances, gingerbread cookies are used for decorating windows as well as the Christmas tree. Although originating in Sweden, strawberry-flavoured marshmallow Santa Claus candy called "juleskum" is also commonly eaten in Norway.

On Christmas Eve, many families eat risengrynsgrøt, a type of rice porridge that includes a single almond, scalded of its skin to leave it white. Whoever gets the almond wins a prize, usually a marzipan pig.

Brewing is closely associated with the preparations for jul, and most Norwegian breweries release a traditional Christmas beer, which is darker, stronger and more flavorful than the common Norwegian lagers. Breweries also produce a special soda, known as julebrus. Aquavit is also commonly served as a digestif to accompany the heavy, often fatty meals.

== Phases of Jul ==
=== Julebord ===
Julebord is a holiday banquet, often in the form of a buffet, at which is served traditional Christmas foods and alcoholic beverages. The period during which julebord is hosted begins in November and overlaps the beginning of Advent. The tradition has its roots in the communal parties held in medieval Norway as part of the Gulaþing.

As times have changed since 1000 CE, the labor-intensive tradition of serving julebord at home is vanishing; the custom is moving out of private life to become an end-of-the year corporate social gathering, usually at a restaurant or a rented facility with ordered catering. In most cases employers only invite employees, not their families. There is typically one party for every employer and other organizations that one might be a member of, as well as large corporations inviting important clients, and non-alcoholic parties at schools and kindergartens.

=== Advent ===
Advent starts with the fourth Sunday before Christmas.

December 1 to 24, it is common for children to have their own Advent calendar which contains one small gift for each day leading up to Christmas. Typically it contains sweets like chocolate, small toys or in later years LEGO bricks encouraging building of a small piece of a larger Lego-construction throughout the calendar.

=== Little Christmas ===
December 23 also has special status as lille julaften, 'Little Christmas Eve'. Many use this day to decorate the Christmas tree if they have not already done so. Some allow children to open one small present as a teaser for the day to come.

=== Julaften ===
On julaften, Christmas Eve, many families gather around the TV in the morning to watch the Czech movie Three Wishes for Cinderella (narrated by a voiceover in Norwegian by Knut Risan), followed by Reisen til Julestjernen (1976) and a Disney Christmas special. Some children get a Christmas stocking with candy when they wake up. Often, the parents use this time to prepare the Christmas dinner. Many families go to church before dinner, even many who never go to church otherwise. It is common to eat rice porridge for lunch, and dinner is usually at 5 p.m., when the church bells ring to symbolize the beginning of the main holiday. It is called ringe julen inn, "ringing in Christmas". After dinner and dessert (often leftover rice porridge mixed with whipped cream, called riskrem, served with a red berry sauce), the gifts are opened.

=== Romjul ===
Romjul is the week between Christmas Eve and New Year's Eve, known in English as the 'Interscotia'. All hunting, but not fishing, is prohibited on these days; during julefred ("Christmas Peace") there is a closed season on all wild animals.

The First and Second Day of Christmas (December 25 and 26) are holidays, and all businesses are closed.

December 25 is usually considered a very private holiday, when one sees only family. On December 26, it is fairly common to invite close friends over to help eat up what is left of the food from Christmas Eve.

=== Julebukk ===
Julebukk translates to 'Yule goat'. Today it is commonly known as a goat figurine made out of straw, created in the beginning of December often used as a Christmas ornament. The Yule Goat's oldest representation is that of Thorr's magical goats, which would lead him through the night sky. The Yule Goat was also a spirit that would protect the house during Yuletide and it was tradition to sacrifice a goat to the Gods and accompanying spirits during the time span between the Winter Solstice "Winter Night" and the New Year called romjul. It was during romjul that a goat or julebukk was sacrificed; adults then donned guises to personify the julebukk. Animal masks and skins, commonly goats and horses, were donned in an activity called "hoodening". Participants would parade from house to house, disguising their voices, singing, offering spiritual protection and warnings. The group would receive small amounts of money, food and drink in exchange for the blessing they offered.

=== New Year's Eve ===
December 31 is commonly a half day at work. In the evening, families tend to have a dinner party similar to the Christmas Eve dinner, though it is common to invite friends and/or neighbours. As midnight approaches, it is common to leave the house and light up fireworks together with neighbours, as they congratulate each other.

=== End of Christmas ===
The exact date that ends jul varies. One common date is the thirteenth day of Christmas, Epiphany, of the Mass of St. Knut, on January 7. Another is the old gisladag or tjuendedag, the twentieth day, on January 12, also called Epiphany Day. By Candlemas on February 2, the Christmas tree and all decorations have usually been removed.

== See also ==
- Advent calendar
- Norway at Christmas worldwide
- Jól (Iceland)
- Jul (Denmark)
- Jul (Sweden)
- Yule
