= Julebord =

Scandinavian Christmas banquet

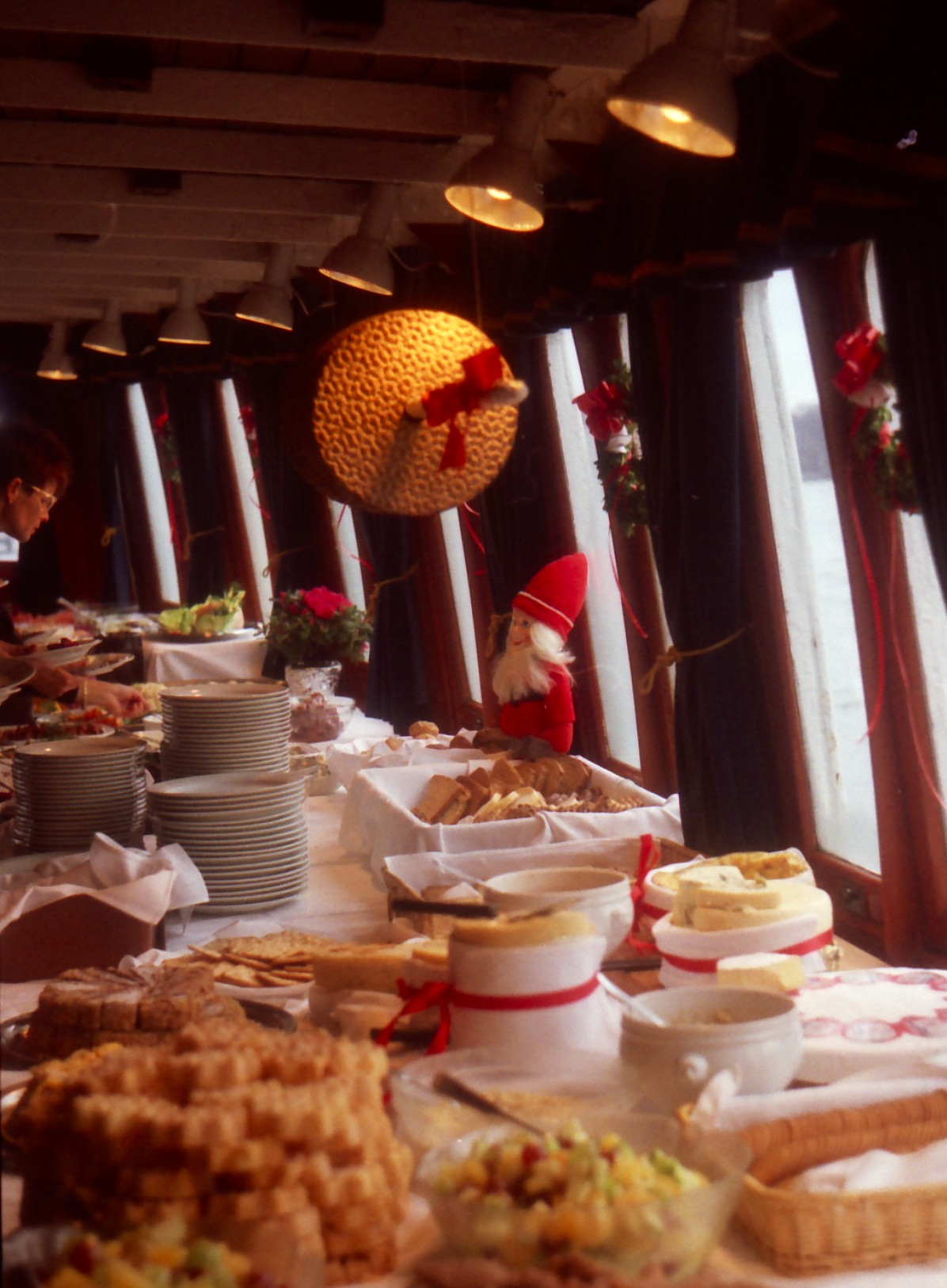
Swedish Julbord aboard the cruise boat Gustavsberg VII in 1990.

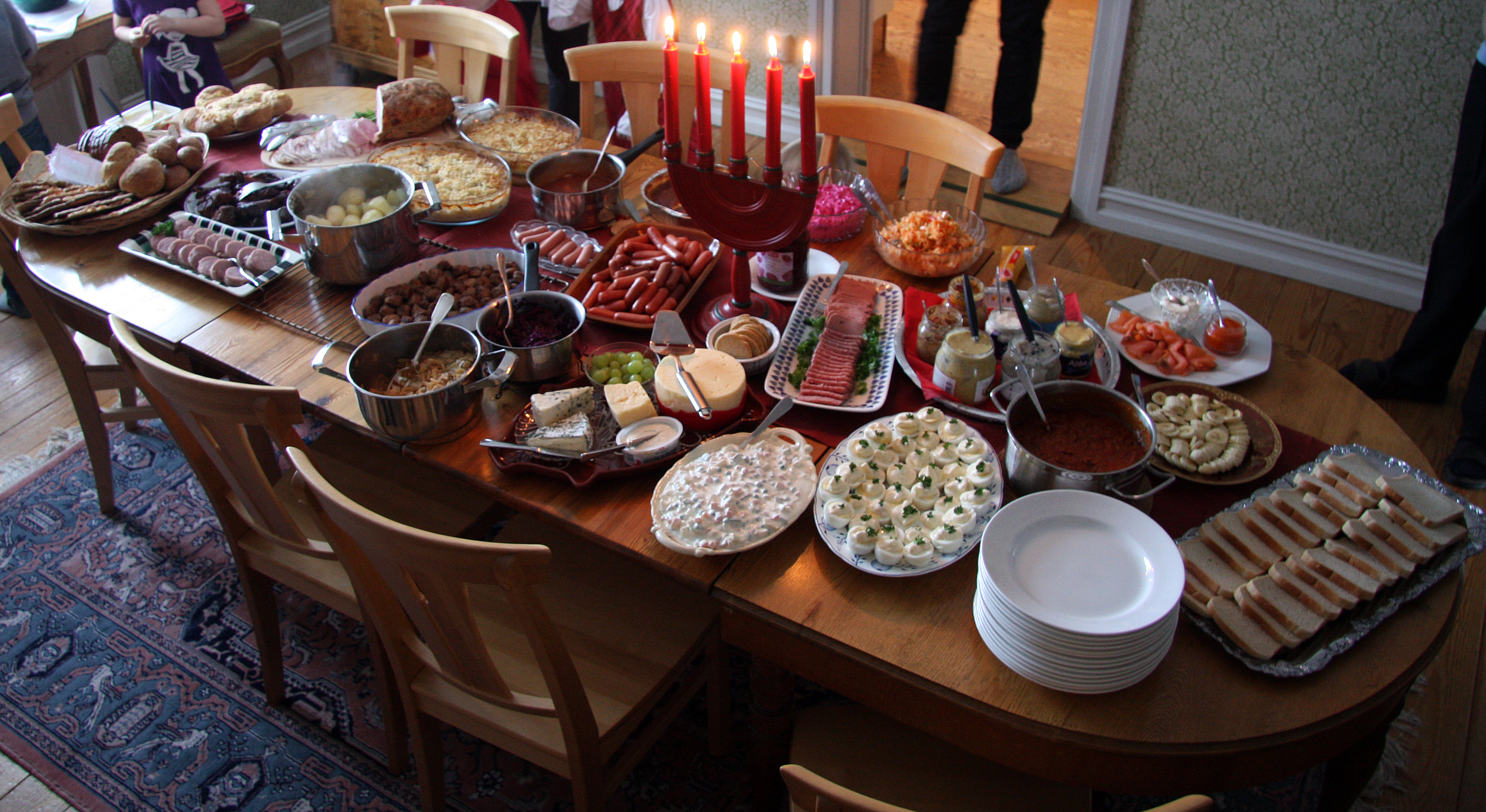
Christmas table in a Swedish home.

Julebord (Danish: julefrokost [ˈjuːləˌfʁɔɡ̊ʌsd], Norwegian: julebord or jolebord, Swedish: julbord) is a Scandinavian feast or banquet during the Christmas season where traditional Christmas food and alcoholic beverages are served. Originally, the julebord belonged to Christmas itself, i.e., the period from Christmas Day and onwards. Today julebord is also often organized by employers or organizations for the employees or members.

Many julebords are characterized by large amounts of food and drink, both traditional and new, hot and cold dishes. There is often lively partying and the party can be an important social meeting place for colleagues. Julebords are a popular tradition that creates high season for the restaurant industry, the taxi industry and ferry companies during this season.

== Etymology ==
The Norwegian word julebord and the Swedish word julbord directly translate as "Christmas table", while the Danish word julefrokost means "Christmas lunch".

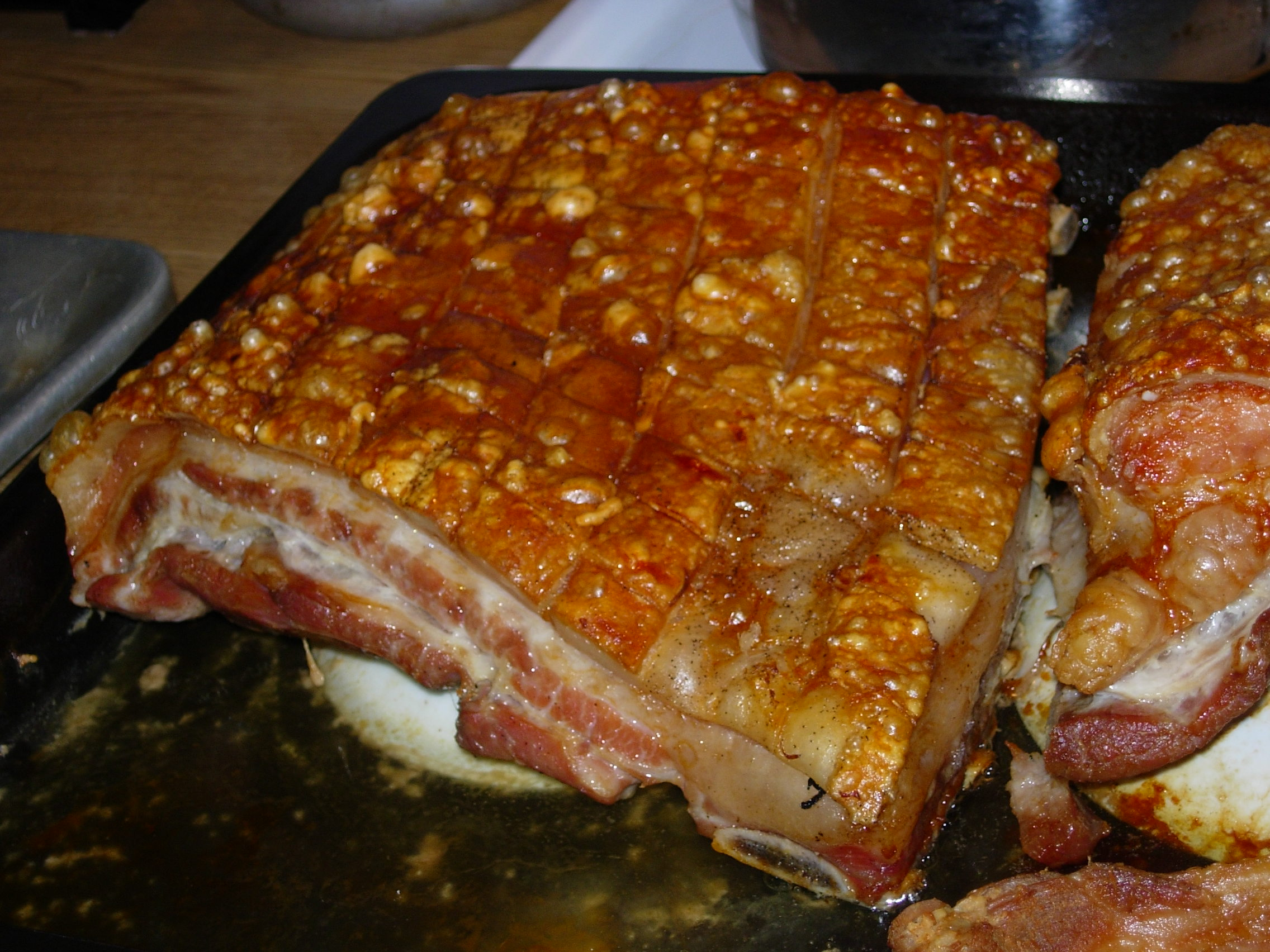
Christmas Pork ribs (svineribbe)

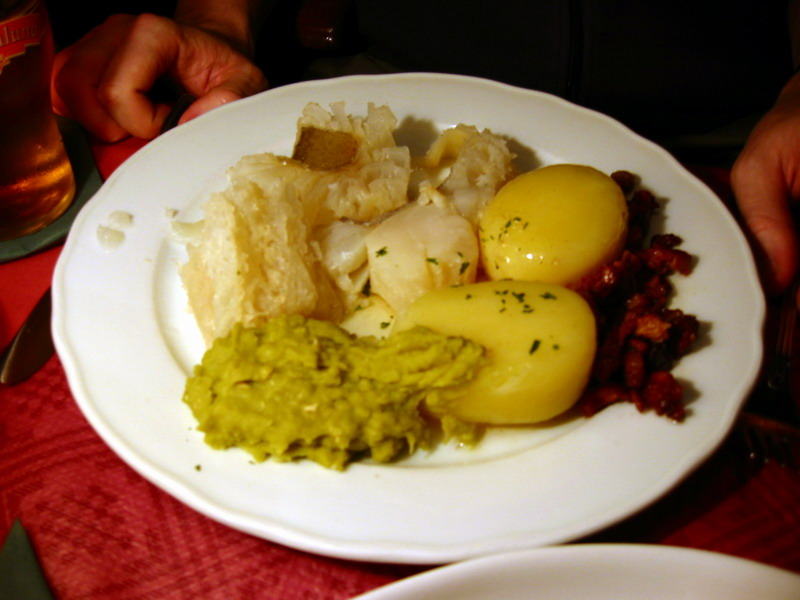
A plate of lutefisk, which is typical for Julebord

== Traditional Julebord cuisine ==
Traditional Christmas food is usually served at Julebord events. These include: Rice pudding (risengrød), pork rib ( Danish: flæskesteg, Norwegian: ribbe), lamb or mutton (pinnekjøtt), spicy sausage (medisterpølse) and lutefisk. The meal is usually served along with sour (red) cabbage (surkål/rødkål), brussels sprouts and lingonberry jam. It is customary to drink mulled wine (glögg), Christmas beer (juleøl) or akevitt/akvavit/aquavit as an aperitif.

== Swedish "Julbord" ==
The Swedish julbord differs from its Norwegian and Danish counterparts. The Swedish julbord is a form of smörgåsbord and the main meal served at Christmas.

== See also ==
- Gottebord
- Smörgåsbord
- Christmas dinner
- Joulupöytä
