= Saffranspannkaka =

Pudding dessert from the island of Gotland, Sweden

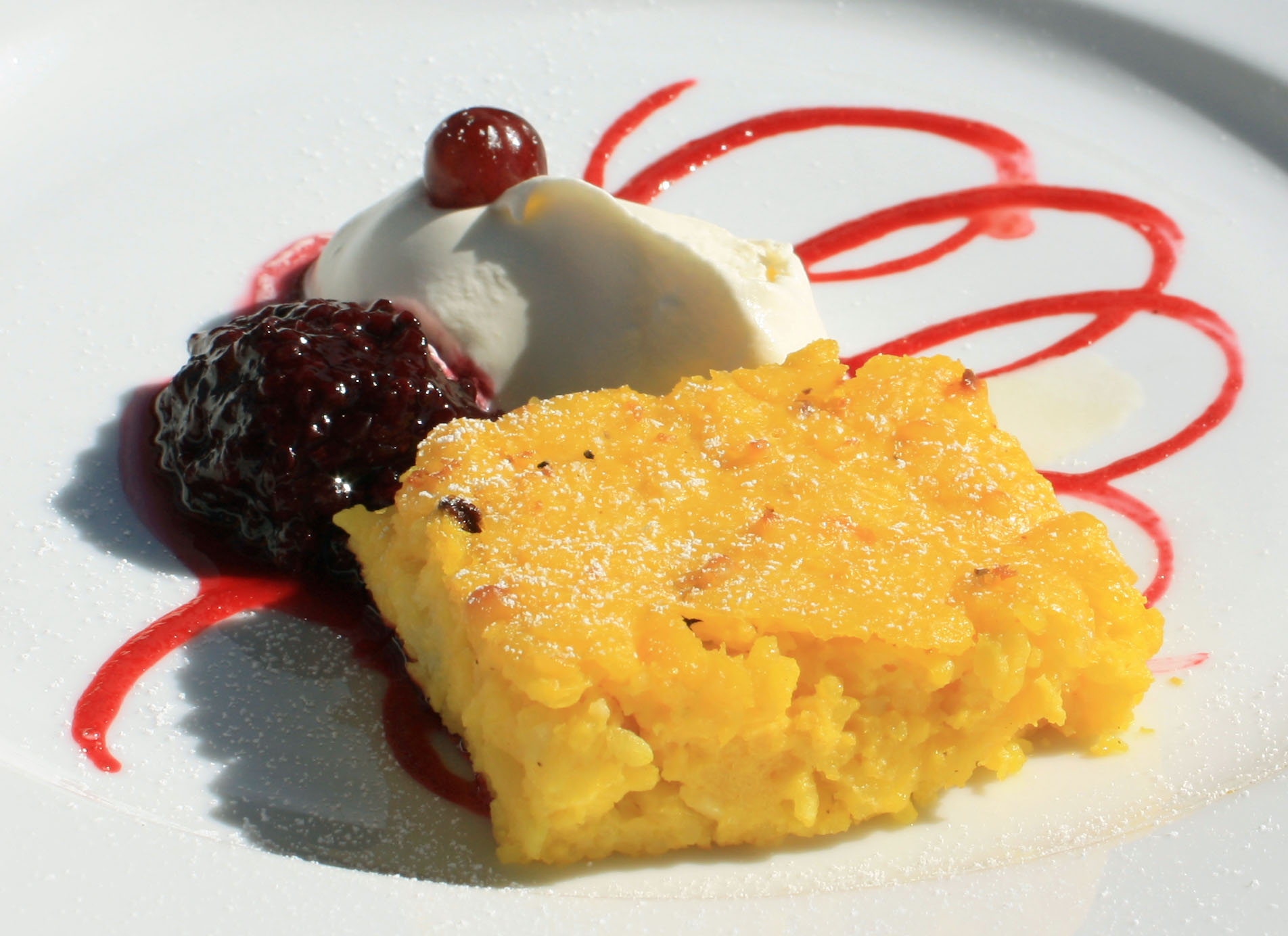
- Saffranspannkaka with dewberry jam and whipped cream.
- Alternative names: saffron pancake; gotlandspannkaka; Gotland pancake
- Course: Dessert
- Place of origin: Sweden
- Region or state: Gotland
- Invented: Circa 19th century
- Cooking time: 20 minutes to 1 hour 15 min
- Serving temperature: Tepid or cold
- Main ingredients: Rice pudding; Cream; Milk; Sugar; Egg; Saffron
- Ingredients generally used: Almond; Dewberry jam; Whipped cream
- Food energy (per 100 g serving): 390 kcal (1,600 kJ)Arla.se
Nutritional value
(per 100 g serving)
- Protein: 8 g
- Fat: 29 g
- Carbohydrate: 25 g
- Other information: Store-bought rice pudding is commonly used, as it shortens the cooking time considerably.

Saffranspannkaka or gotlandspannkaka (English: saffron pancake or Gotland pancake, Gutnish: saffranspannkake or saffranspannkakå) is a dessert from the island of Gotland, Sweden, and is considered one of their provincial dishes. It is made of rice pudding, cream, milk, sugar, egg, chopped almonds, and saffron mixed together and baked. The cake can be eaten tepid or cold and is traditionally served with dewberry jam and whipped cream.

== History ==
The concept of a saffron pancake has its roots in medieval cuisine, when wealthy households served flavoured and coloured rice puddings. Gotland's status as part of the Hanseatic League provided geographical and financial access to exotic spices. The particular combination of rice-almond-saffron-sugar made the dish extremely exclusive, compared to the saffron bread that has been known since the 16th century.

Oven pancakes, which were mostly served during feasts, have been made on Gotland since the 18th century. They are turned into feast food with the addition of fine flour and eggs. During the 19th century, it became common not only to add sugar to the pancakes, but also saffron and raisins. Today's saffranspannkaka, made with rice pudding that is then baked in an oven, belongs to the class of pudding desserts which became common during the 19th century when the wood stove made cooking easier.

The saffranspannkaka is associated with Christmas, as it is sometimes made with the leftover Christmas pudding, but in the 19th and 20th century, it was also served during anniversaries, weddings, and funerals. The jams eaten with the pancake are also a fashion from the 19th century, when sugar became cheaper. It is unknown if the saffranspannkaka was created on Gotland, or if someone brought it to the island.

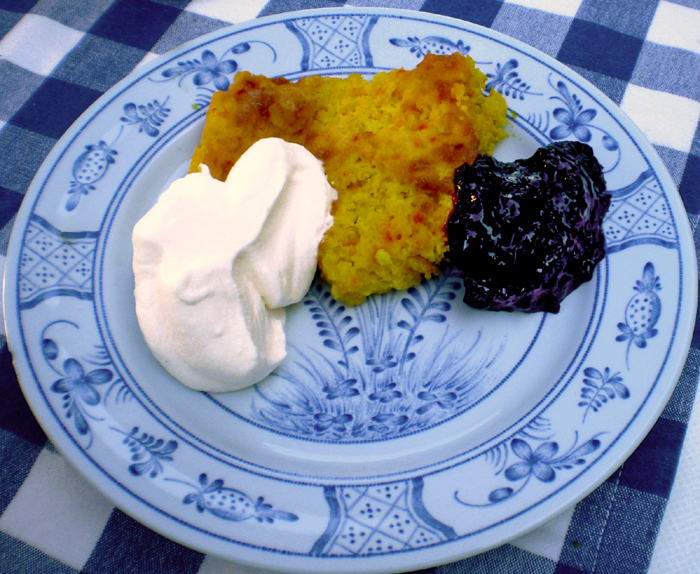

During the latter half of the 20th century, the saffranspannkaka have become a well-known tourism symbol for Gotland and is often served at summer-open tourism restaurants and in other contexts where the local island food is highlighted. It has also been named Gotland's provincial dish.
