= Gottebord =

Swedish Christmas table-setting for sweets

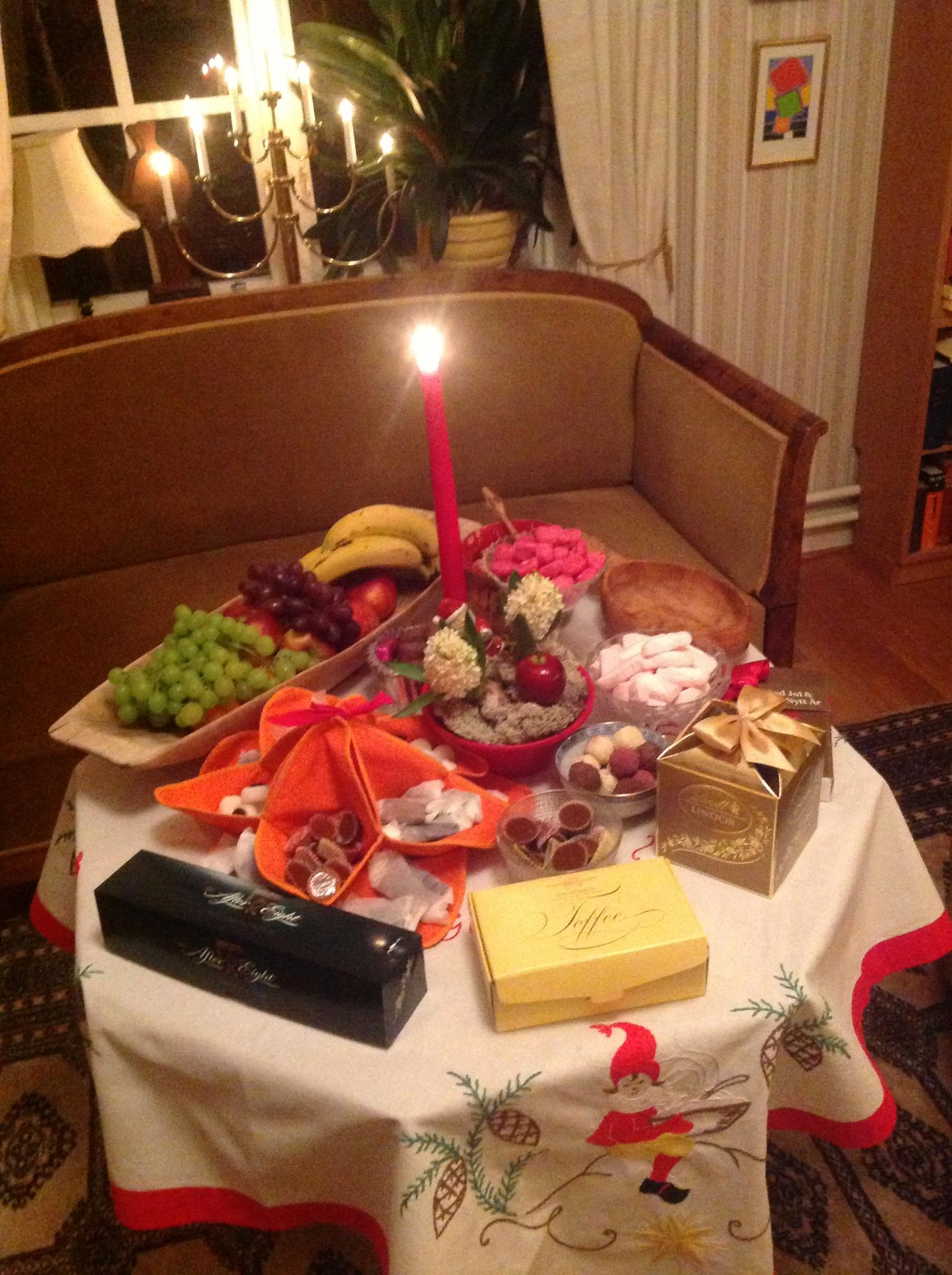
Swedish gottebord

Gottebord (Swedish for "sweets table") is a traditional Swedish Christmas table. Gottebord is a special table with various sweets laid out on it. It can be decorated with a Christmas ornament and other Christmas decorations. Commonly used snacks are Christmas candy like knäck, caramels and marzipan, pastries like saffron buns and gingerbread, fresh and dried fruit, and nuts. Sometimes it can also contain chocolates and desserts like risalamande (ris à la Malta).

== See also ==
- Julebord
