= Ljuskrona =

Swedish chandelier

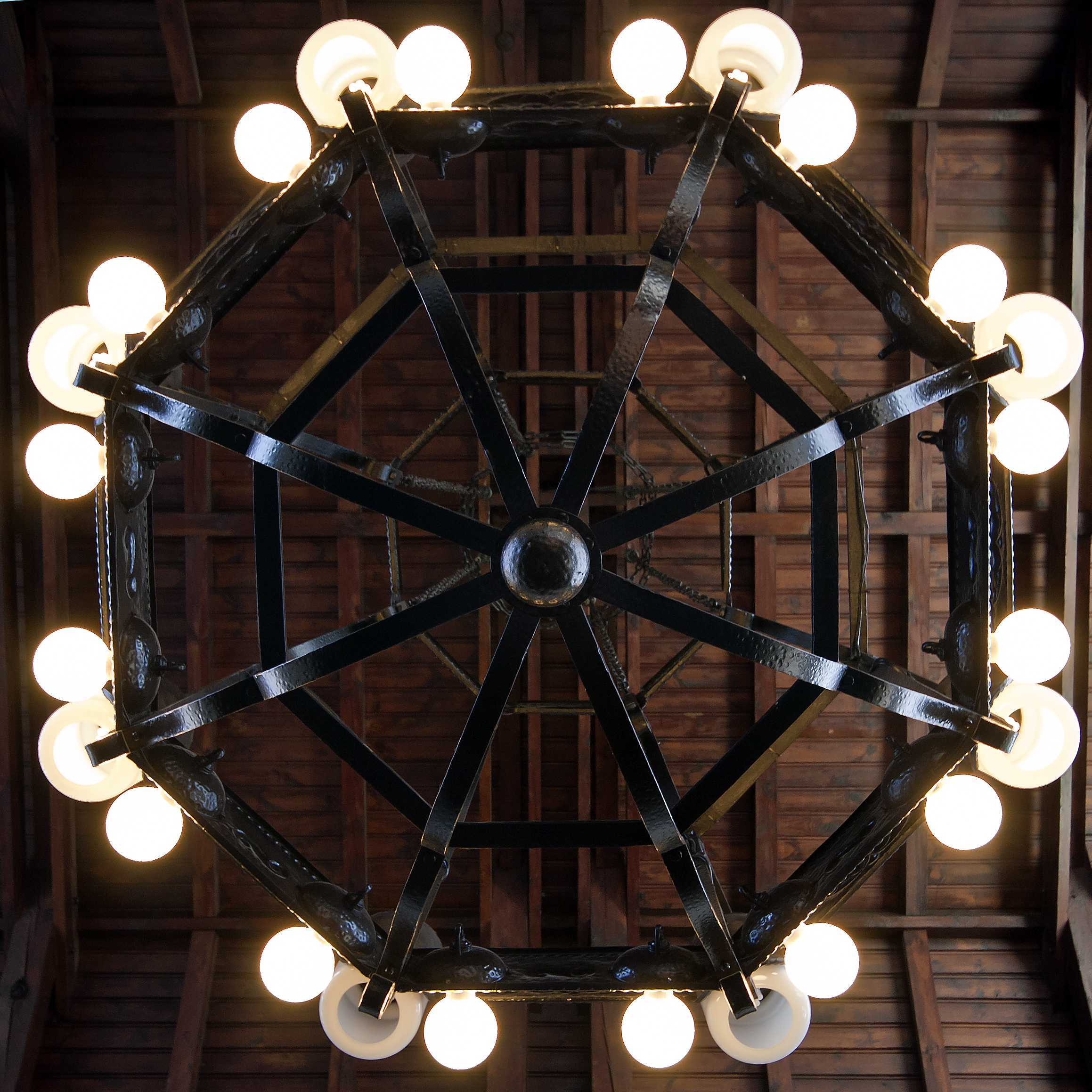

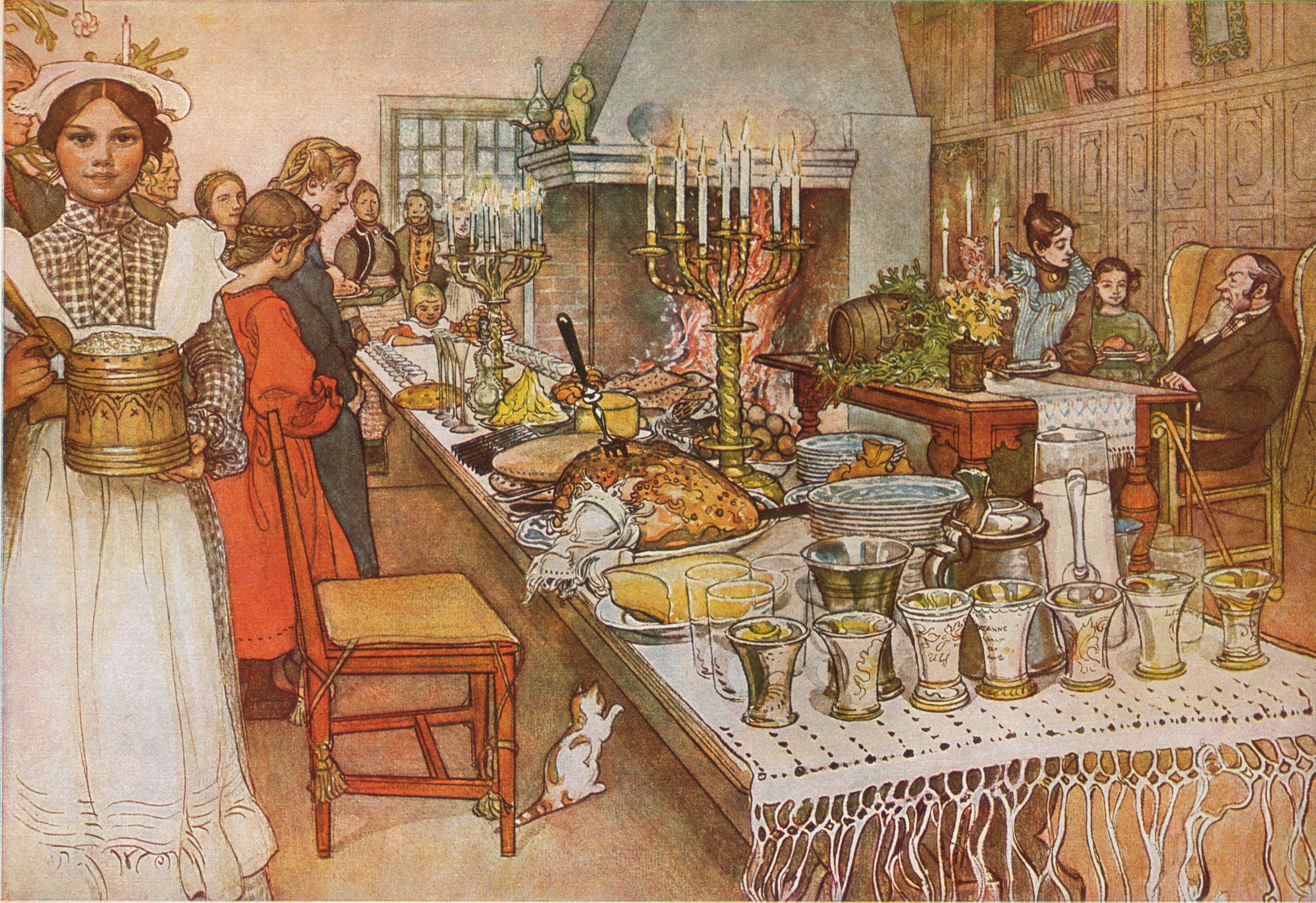
Carl Larsson: "Julaftonen" (akvarell, 1904-05) Ljusstaken on table to the right

Ljuskrona ("light crown") is a Swedish term for chandelier. The term is currently used to describe both the chandelier itself, and the Christmas traditions surrounding its creation and use. The tradition originated in Sweden during Jul. Emigrants carried it to other countries beginning in the early 19th century.

== History ==
The ljuskrona is a distinctive candle holder, which is wrapped in fringed paper. Ljuskronas have historically been made out of discarded materials and then covered with cut paper. The paper is usually newspaper, wrapping paper or crepe paper in various colors. Although it is usually thought of as a secular tradition for the home, it is also found in some churches. In some areas of Sweden the tradition continues as a private family custom. The type and color of paper used appears to be a personal family decision, with some preference given to decisions made in previous years.

Ljuskrona are taken out from their hiding place on December 13, St. Lucia Day. At that time, repairs or a complete re-wrapping will take place. Usually the mother or oldest child teaches the younger ones how to “decorate” the ljuskrona. The ljuskrona is put away on St. Knut's Day, January 13, as are all of the other Christmas decorations. Some rural families burn the Christmas tree that night.

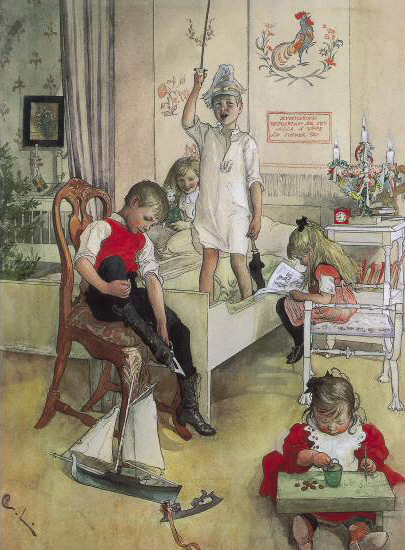
Carl Larsson: "Christmas Morning" (1894) Ljusstaken on table on right rear of this painting

The term ljuskrona was used in the US to describe both ljuskrona (lit. "light crowns", chandeliers) and ljusstaken (lit. “light stakes”, candelabras) even though, technically, one is a ceiling-mounted light fixture and the other a standing light fixture. Some families will refer to the paper-wrapped candle holders as julstaken, julkrona, jul tradet, or simply Swedish Christmas trees, regardless of whether the object sits or hangs.

== Swedish-Americans ==
In 1988, the Folk Art section of the US National Endowment for the Arts awarded a grant for the implementation of a survey to document practices and styles extant in the US. The grant led to a traveling exhibition that included eight styles and ten photo panels. A slide show of the styles and anomalies featured in the project was funded by the Kansas Humanities Council. The project documented approximately 300 ljuskrona, generally created in the Midwestern United States. Interviews provided information about family gatherings to re-wrap the candle holders, the custom of lighting the candles on Christmas Eve and the occasional candle holder that caught on fire.

Ten distinct styles have been found. These styles correlate with the style that was predominant in the area of Sweden from which the creator originated. Four methods of cutting the paper are found, with variations such as curling, using pinking shears or cutting two colors together to give a variegated effect.

== Public collections ==
The Nordic Museum of Stockholm, houses models and photographs of Ljuskrona. In the US, Ljuskrona exist in the collections of the American Swedish Institute in Minneapolis; the Nordic Heritage Museum in Seattle, Washington; the Illinois Historical Museum in Henry County; the Bishop Hill Heritage Association Museum in Bishop Hill Colony, Illinois; the Lindsborg Old Mill & Swedish Heritage Museum in Lindsborg, Kansas and Winterthur Museum in Delaware.
