= Icelandic Christmas book flood =

Surge in new book releases before Christmas

The Christmas book flood or Yule book flood (Icelandic: Jólabókaflóðið) is a term used in Iceland for the annual release of new books occurring in the months before Christmas. These books are then purchased as presents to be gifted on Christmas Eve. This practice makes books the most popular Christmas gift in the country.

Newly published books are listed in an annual catalogue called the Journal of Books (Icelandic: Bókatíðindi) that is distributed to all households for free. The release of the Journal is the beginning of the book flood, signifying the start of the holiday season. The tradition comes from both Iceland's centuries-long literary history and the state of the economy during WWII, when strict currency restrictions limited the amount of imported giftware. Given that restrictions on imported paper were more lenient than on other products, books became and stayed the Christmas gift of choice. While often characterized internationally as a cozy domestic tradition involving reading and drinking hot chocolate on Christmas Eve, some critics argue that this narrative is a romanticized portrayal of what remains primarily a peak retail and publishing period.

== History ==
Iceland has a long history of literary culture, with references to writing from as far back as the settlement of the nation. Runes were the first samples of writing in the nation, coming from the Nordic cultures that were the first to move to Iceland. Runes have been found within the nation dating back to the 10th century; however, they have been referenced in other texts, suggesting their existence as early as settlement in the 800s. These runes were also thought to be passed down from the gods, making literature a fundamental piece of the beginning of Icelandic culture.

Most famously, a collection of works known as the Icelandic Sagas began the true Icelandic fascination with literature in a way that was independent of any other nation. These works were written between the 12th and 15th centuries, though it is believed that they existed first as oral tales before they were written down. Their subject was that of historical records that became more narrative over time. For the Icelanders, this meant written tales of certain families and individuals that allowed for the record keeping of Icelandic society. With a foundation of writing and reading established at the base of the nation's culture, the trend of literature was established and continued.

The tradition officially began in 1944, when the Journal of Books was first published, as a result of the post-World War II economy. Many nations isolated themselves as they rebuilt their economies, most notably in western Europe. This diminished the number of imports Iceland received from other nations, which included most forms of giftware. Limitations on paper goods were not as restrictive, making them a more common import during the post-war era. Due to their neutrality in the war, Iceland had not faced the same economic crash that most of Europe had, which left them with an above-average spending capacity and fewer items to spend on. When the holiday season came, books were the most available gift.

== See also ==
- Christmas in Iceland
- Hangikjöt
- Icelandic Christmas folklore
- St. George's Day in Catalonia, another holiday celebrated by the giving of books
- World Book Day
