= Christmas in Iceland =

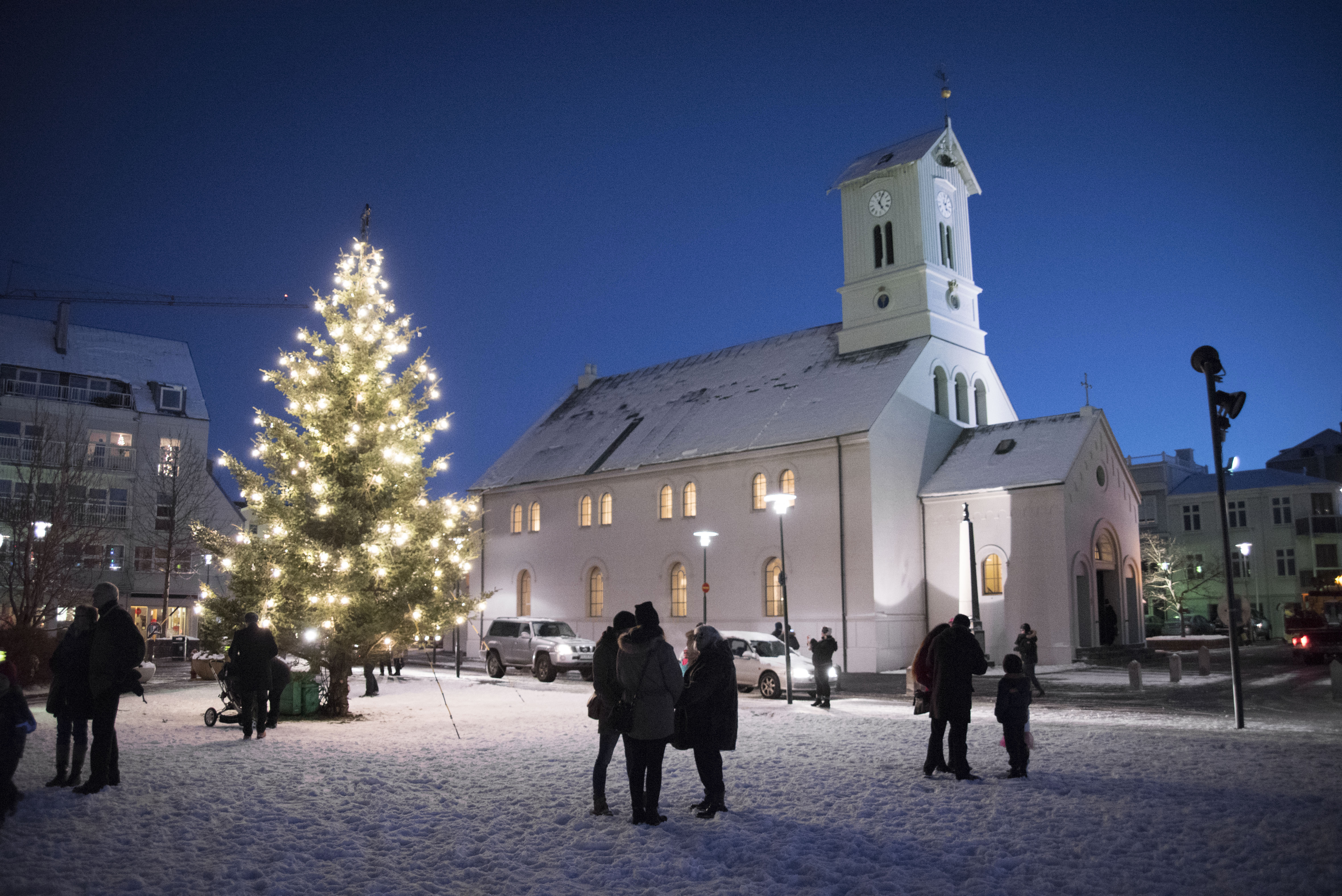
A Christmas tree outside Reykjavik Cathedral

Christmas in Iceland (Jól) begins on 24 December (Aðfangadagur) and ends thirteen days later on 6 January (Þrettándinn, coinciding with Epiphany).

Traditionally, one candle is lit each Sunday, until four candles are lit on the 24th. At 6:00 p.m. church bells ring to start the Christmas celebration. The religiously observant and/or traditional Icelanders will attend mass at this time, while the secular Icelanders will begin their holiday meal immediately. After the meal is finished, they open gifts and spend the evening together. In Iceland people over the Yule holidays often eat smoked lamb, ptarmigan, and turkey. Glazed ham (known locally as hamborgarhryggur) is also very popular.

Thirteen days before 24 December, children will leave their shoes by a window so that the 13 Yule Lads (jólasveinarnir) can leave small gifts in their shoes. The Yule Lads are the sons of two trolls, Grýla and Leppalúði, living in the Icelandic mountains. Each of the Yule Lads is known for a different kind of mischief (for example slamming doors, stealing meat, stealing milk or eating the candles). Yule Lads traditionally wear early Icelandic wool clothing but are now known for the more recognizable red and white suit.

Each home typically sets up a Christmas tree indoors in the living room, with most decorating it on 11 December. In addition to the decorations, presents are put underneath the tree. It is also a tradition in many homes to boil fish (skate) on the 23rd. The day is known as Saint Thorlak mass (Þorláksmessa).

During the holiday season, it is traditional for families to work together to bake small cookies to serve or give to guests. Most common are thin gingerbread cookies which are decorated in many different colors of glaze. Many families also follow the tradition of making laufabrauð, a flat thin bread that is cut out using a special tool and folding technique.

The end of year is divided between two days: the Old Year's Day (Gamlársdagur) and the New Year's Day (Nýársdagur). At the night of the former and morning of the latter, Icelanders shoot up fireworks, blowing the old year away and welcoming the new one.

Thirteen days after the 24th, on Þrettándinn (6 January), the last of the Yule Lads returns to the mountains and the Christmas season ends; bonfires are held in many places, with fireworks. Dances by costumed elves around the bonfires date from 1871, when pupils of the Reykjavík Latin School staged the play Nýársnótt, in which elves appear, and an Elf King and Queen still visit the Reykjavík bonfires, where people sing and dance to say goodbye to the season. This celebration is known elsewhere as Epiphany Day.

== See also ==
- Icelandic Christmas folklore
- Iceland at Christmas worldwide
- Icelandic Christmas book flood
- Jólaöl
- Yule
- Jul (Denmark)
- Jul (Norway)
- Jul (Sweden)
