= Ischoklad =

Confectionery made from chocolate and coconut oil

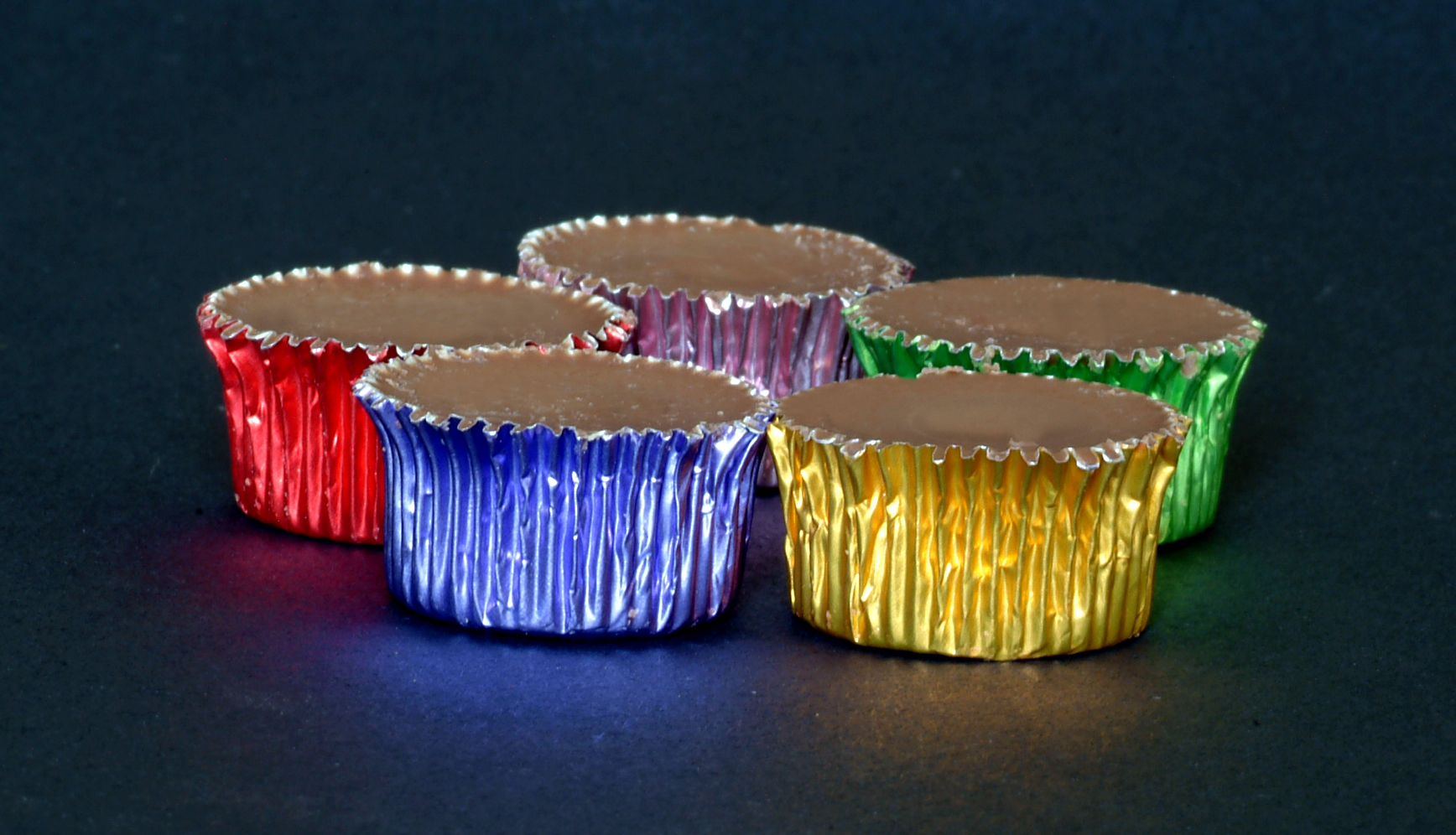
- Type: Confectionery, candy
- Place of origin: Germany
- Main ingredients: Chocolate, coconut oil

Ischoklad ("Ice chocolate"; Eiskonfekt in German, which is also translated as Ice Confectionery) is a candy originating in Germany which is now popular in Germany and Sweden.

== History ==
Ischoklad was invented in 1927 by the confectioner Adam Eichelmann. It is usually made using only chocolate (one-half to two-thirds) and coconut oil (one-third to one-half).

The reference to ice in the name relates to the fact that it melts very easily in the mouth and is perceived to have a cooling effect as the heat energy is absorbed. This effect is due to the melting point of coconut oil lying between 20 and 23 degrees Celsius, around 10 degrees lower than chocolate. In some recipes, menthol is added, and in industrial production, glucose is sometimes added, which both increase the cooling sensation. Ischoklad is a popular Swedish Christmas treat. In Germany, the largest producer of Eiskonfekt is Eichetti.
