= Pinnekjøtt =

Traditional Norwegian Christmas lamb dish

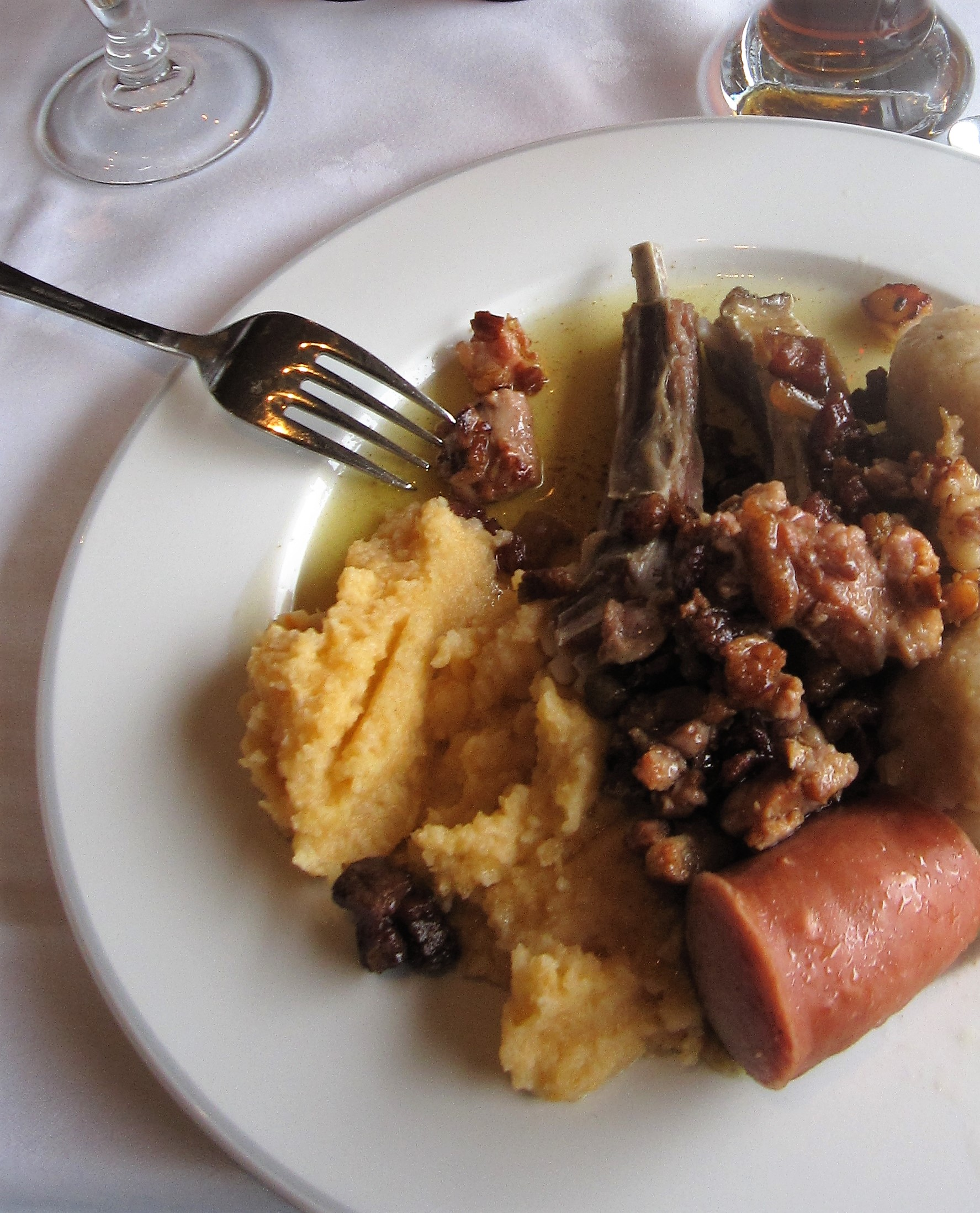
Pinnekjøtt with rutabaga purée, potatoes and sausages

Pinnekjøtt (Norwegian pronunciation: [ˈpɪ̂nːəˌçœt]) is a traditional Norwegian main course dinner dish based on lamb ribs. Pinnekjøtt is a festive dish typical to Western and Northern Norway, and is rapidly gaining popularity in other regions as well. This dish is largely associated with the celebration of Christmas and frequently paired with puréed rutabaga, sausages and potatoes, served with beer and akevitt.

== Preparation ==
The preparation of pinnekjøtt uses a traditional method of food preservation utilising curing, drying and in some regions also smoking as a means of inhibiting the growth of micro-organisms. Although fresh lamb is available today, and frozen can be bought all year round, pinnekjøtt is still prepared both commercially and in private homes due to the flavour and maturing the preservation process gives to the meat.

In home preparation of pinnekjøtt, racks of lamb or mutton are cured in brine or coarse sea salt. Once sufficiently cured, and when the weather is cold enough, the racks are hung in a cool, dark, well ventilated place to dry. In some regions, particularly in parts of Hordaland and Sunnmøre, the fresh racks are commonly smoked prior to drying. Traditionally this was done in order to prevent mould growth during the drying process.

Before cooking, the racks are separated into individual ribs by cutting between the bones. The ribs are then soaked in water so as to rinse out the salt and reconstitute the meat. Today pinnekjøtt is available in most supermarkets before Christmas, smoked or unsmoked, ready cut and sometimes also soaked, ready for cooking. After soaking the ribs are steamed over a little water in a large saucepan. Usually, a grid of twigs of birch is placed in the bottom of the saucepan which will allow the meat to steam more than it is cooked.

== Etymology ==
The origin of the word pinnekjøtt (literally: 'stick meat') is unclear. It may refer to the birch twigs that many use as a kind of steam grate in the pot. The word pinne is also used in dialectal Norwegian in reference to single ribs.

== In culture ==
In the Netflix Original series Lady Dynamite (2017, Season 2 episode "Souplutions"), Maria Bamford’s mother makes pinnekjøtt for the King and Queen of Norway when they visit Duluth, Minnesota.

== See also ==
- List of dried foods
- List of lamb dishes
