= Julotta =

Christmas Day morning church service

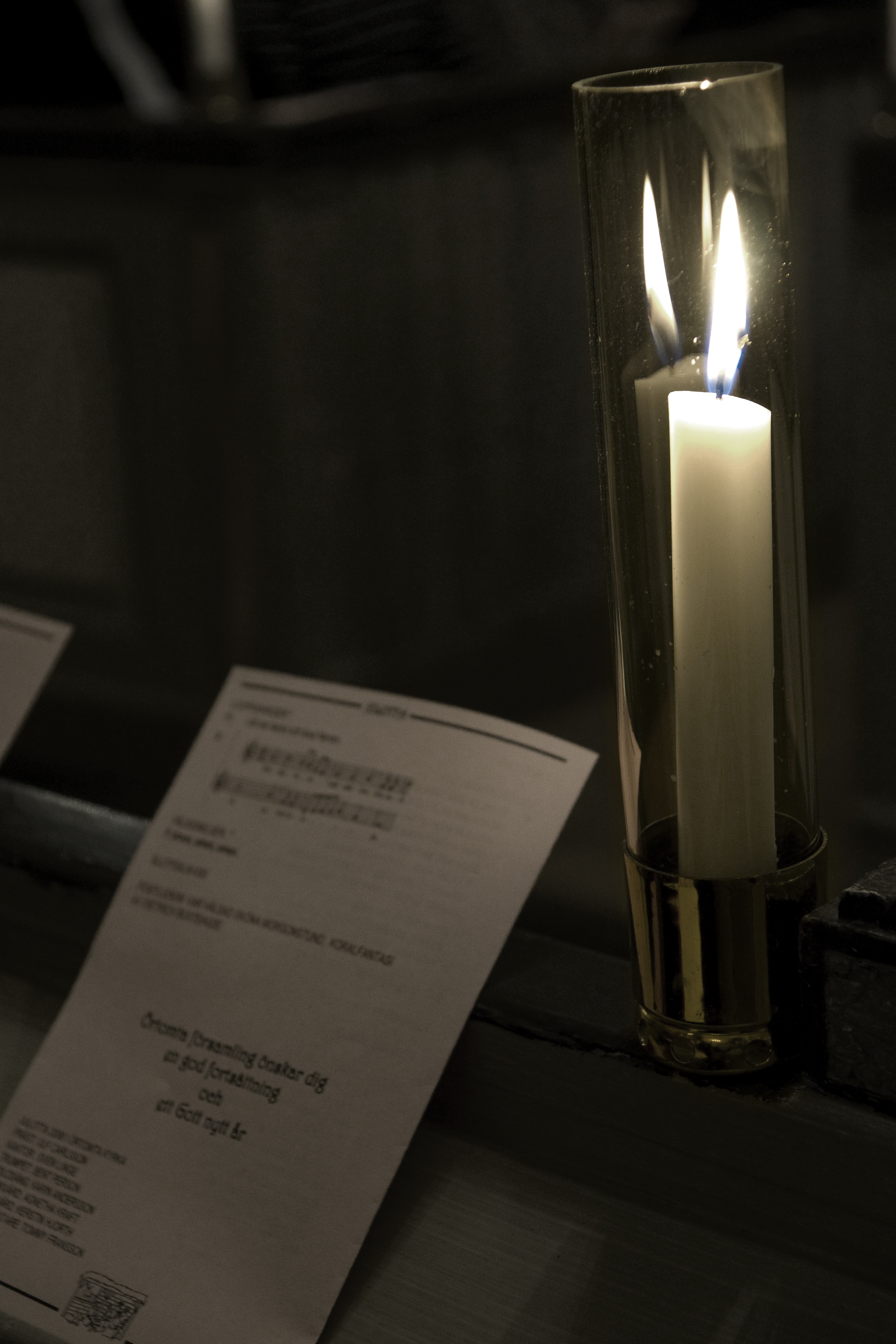
- Candle and julotta programme
- Observed by: Church of Sweden and other Christian denominations
- Date: 25 December
- Next time: 25 December 2026
- Frequency: annual

A julotta (Jul: 'Yule; Christmas', otta: 'dawn') is a Swedish term for the matins on Christmas Day, 25 December, that celebrates the nativity of Jesus Christ.

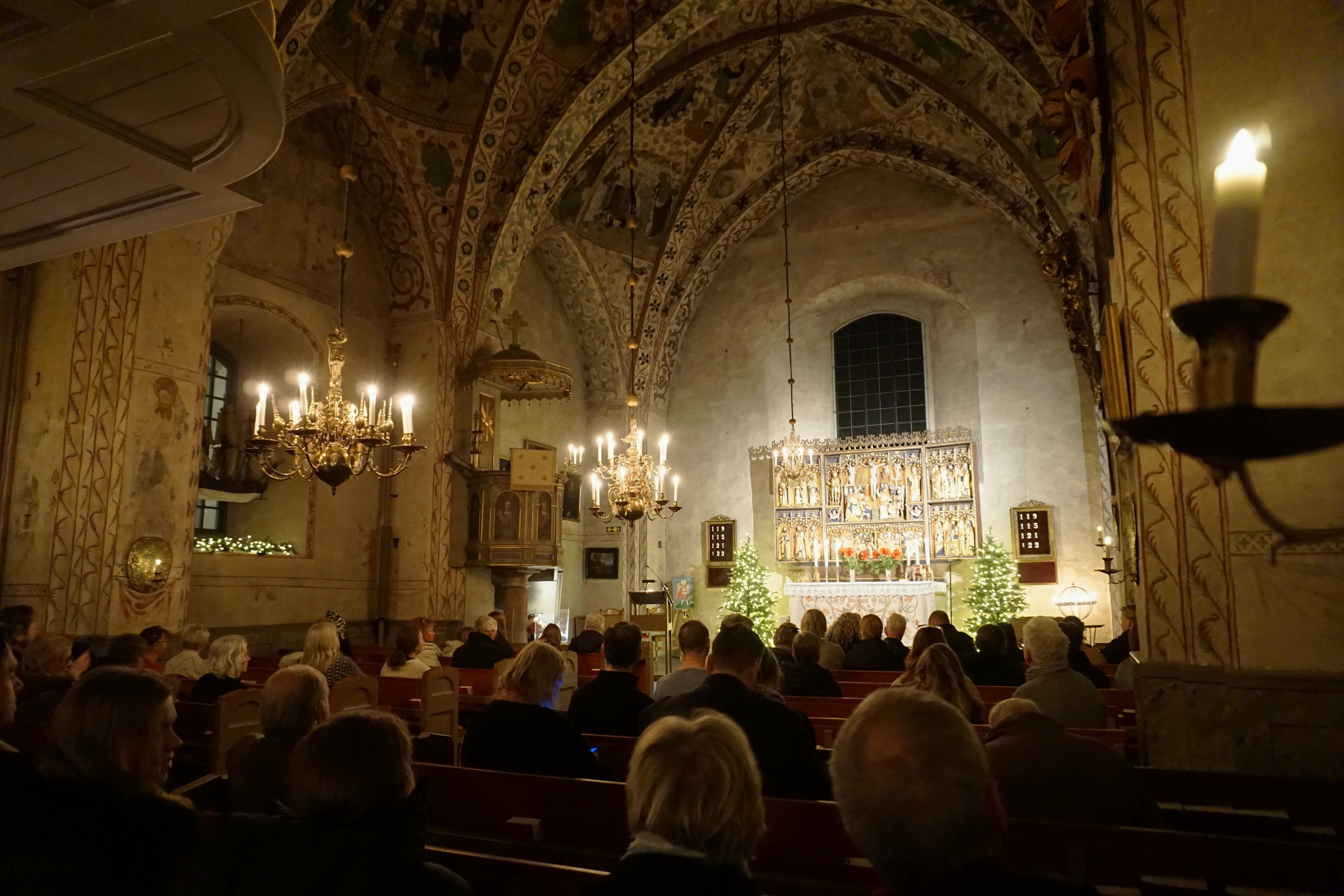
A picture from Täby Church in Stockholm right before the julotta service starts at 5 o'clock in the morning. It is one of the few churches still observing the traditional practice of starting at 5 or as early as 4 o'clock in the morning. Currently the most common time is at 7 o'clock.

== Observance ==
The service is held every 25 December early on Christmas morning – at 7 a.m. in most church buildings, but in some churches it is celebrated at 10 a.m., or as early as 4 a.m. During previous centuries, most julottas were held at 4 a.m. Traditionally, the service should end before, or at the time of, dawn: hence the word otta is the time just before dawn. After julotta, Swedish people race to get home first from the church. The winner is believed to harvest the most bountiful crops for the year ahead.

Historically in the Church of Sweden the clergy was obliged not only to say the high mass but also matins (Swedish: ottesång) and evensong (Swedish: aftonsång); today only the evensong of Christmas remain but has been liturgically changed since and can now be the main service of Christmas Day, wherefore many parishes have no mid-morning high mass on Christmas Day.

== History ==
Julotta was traditionally the most popular service in the Church of Sweden but the Midnight Mass on 24 December has become more popular. People who hardly attended church regularly in the rest of the year often attended the julotta but they tend to go to the Midnight Mass or the Advent Sunday service.

The decline of julotta in favour of the Midnight Mass began in Sweden during the 1970s.

In 1979 5.35% of Church of Sweden members attended their parish church on Christmas Day, but by 1988, the number had decreased to 3.76%.

Swedish immigrants spread the festivity to different countries.
