= Sesame seed candy =

Food

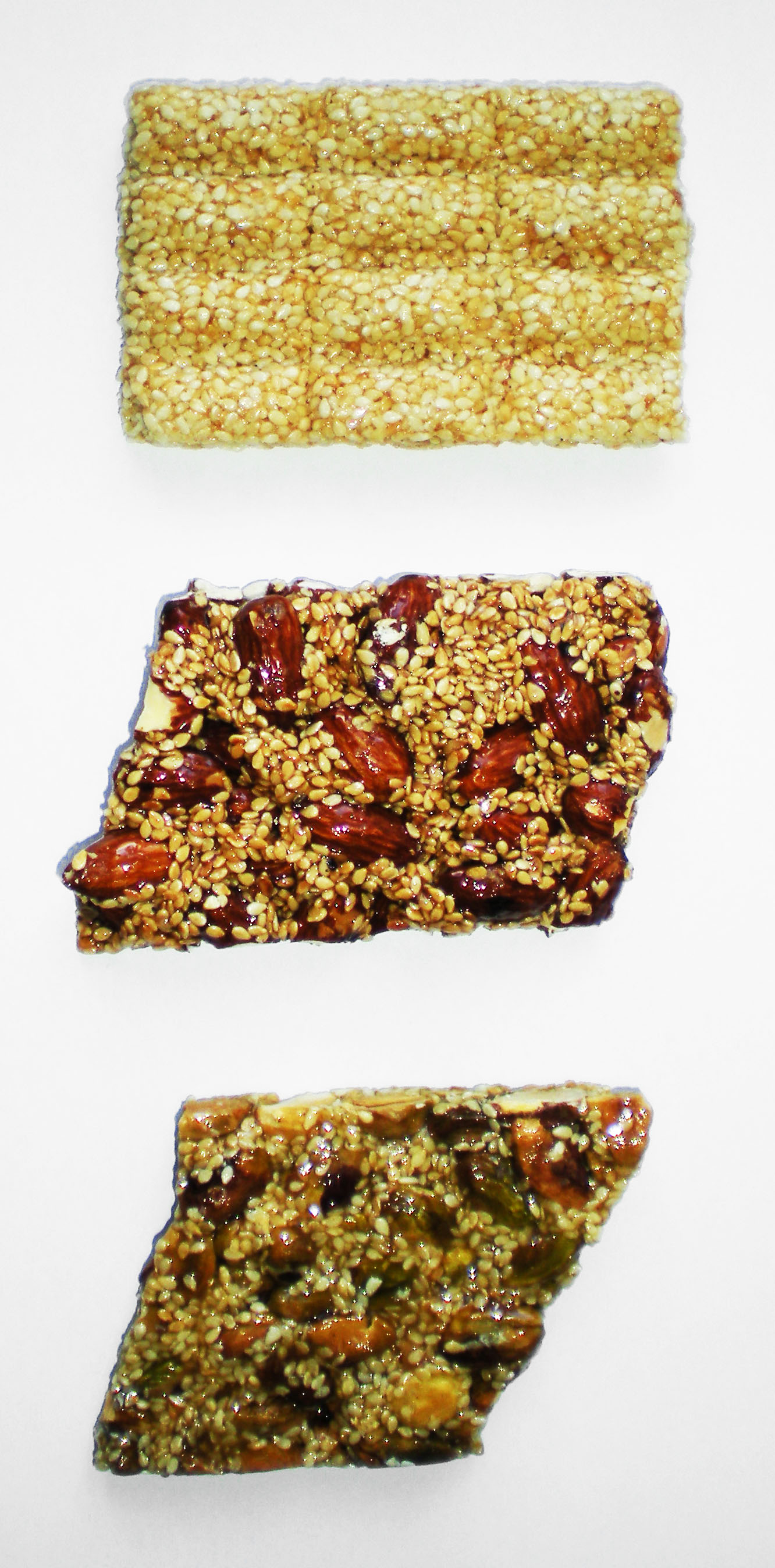
- Three varieties of sesame seed candy
- Type: Confectionery
- Place of origin: Ancient Greece
- Main ingredients: Sesame seeds, sugar or honey

The term "sesame candy" may also refer to sesame halva or ufuta.

Sesame seed candy is a confection of sesame seeds and sugar or honey pressed into a ball, bar or wafer. It is popular across East Africa, Middle East, South Asia, and East Asia, as well as in some European countries and Australia. The texture may vary from chewy to crisp. It may also be called sesame (seed) candy/bar/crunch; sesame seed cake may refer to the confection or to a leavened cake or cookie incorporating sesame.

== By location ==
=== Ancient Greece, Rome and Byzantine Empire ===
Similar foods are documented in Ancient Greek cuisine: itrion (ἴτριον) was a thin biscuit/cake made with sesame seeds and honey, the Cretan koptoplakous (κοπτοπλακοῦς) or gastris (γάστρις) was a layer of ground nuts sandwiched between two layers of sesame crushed with honey. Herodotus also mentions "sweet cakes of sesame and honey", but with no detail. The kopte sesamis (κοπτὴ σησαμίς), or simply κοπτὴ, was a cake made from pounded sesame; the ingredients suggest that it was similar to the modern Greek pasteli.

In the Byzantine Empire, a sesame sweet, regarded as the ancestor of the modern Greek pasteli, was mentioned by various writers such as John Tzetzes and Theodore Prodromos, who called it sesamous (σησαμοῦς), stating that it was ordinarily eaten. John Choumnos says that this sweet was eaten at weddings, for fertility and good offspring, just like it is eaten today in Greece.

=== Greece and Cyprus ===
In modern Greece and Cyprus, sesame seed candy is called pasteli (παστέλι < Italian pastello), a descendant of the Byzantine sesamous. It is generally a flat, oblong bar made with honey and often including nuts. On Rhodes, a similar candy is called melekouni (μελεκούνι).

=== Indian subcontinent ===
Various kinds of sesame candy are found in the south Asian cuisine. Sesame candy in the forms of rewri/revri (a candy coated with sesame seeds), as well as gajak (a sugar or jaggery sweet with sesame seeds), is widely eaten in northern India and Pakistan; the cities of Lucknow and Chakwal are very famous for it. The Assamese tilor laru is an Assamese breakfast snack. The Maharashtran tilgul ladoo is a ball of sesame and sugar flavored with peanuts and cardamom and associated with the festival of Makar Sankranti.

=== China ===
Sesame seed candy is called hei zhima su 'black sesame crisp' in Chinese. Traditionally it is made with nuts (including peanuts, almonds, and walnuts) or dried fruits (including raisins and dried goji) and primarily with black sesame.

=== Vietnam ===
A variety of sesame seed candy containing peanuts, alongside sesame seeds and granulated sugar, is produced in the central Quảng Ngãi province where it is referred to as kẹo gương. It is believed to have been produced in the region for more than 400 years.

=== Iran ===
In Iran's Mazandaran Province, it is a popular local candy made in various festivities such as Nowruz and Yalda night. It is usually made as thin layers and may contain walnuts, almonds, pistachios or other nuts.

=== Poland ===
Sezamki are a traditional Polish sesame seed candy made from toasted sesame seeds bound together with caramelized sugar or honey. These thin, crunchy bars are a beloved sweet treat in Poland, often enjoyed as a quick snack or dessert.

=== Australia ===
"Sesame snaps" a small crunchy/crisp rectangle, made with sugar, nutty and sweet a popular children's school snack in Australia.

== Gallery ==
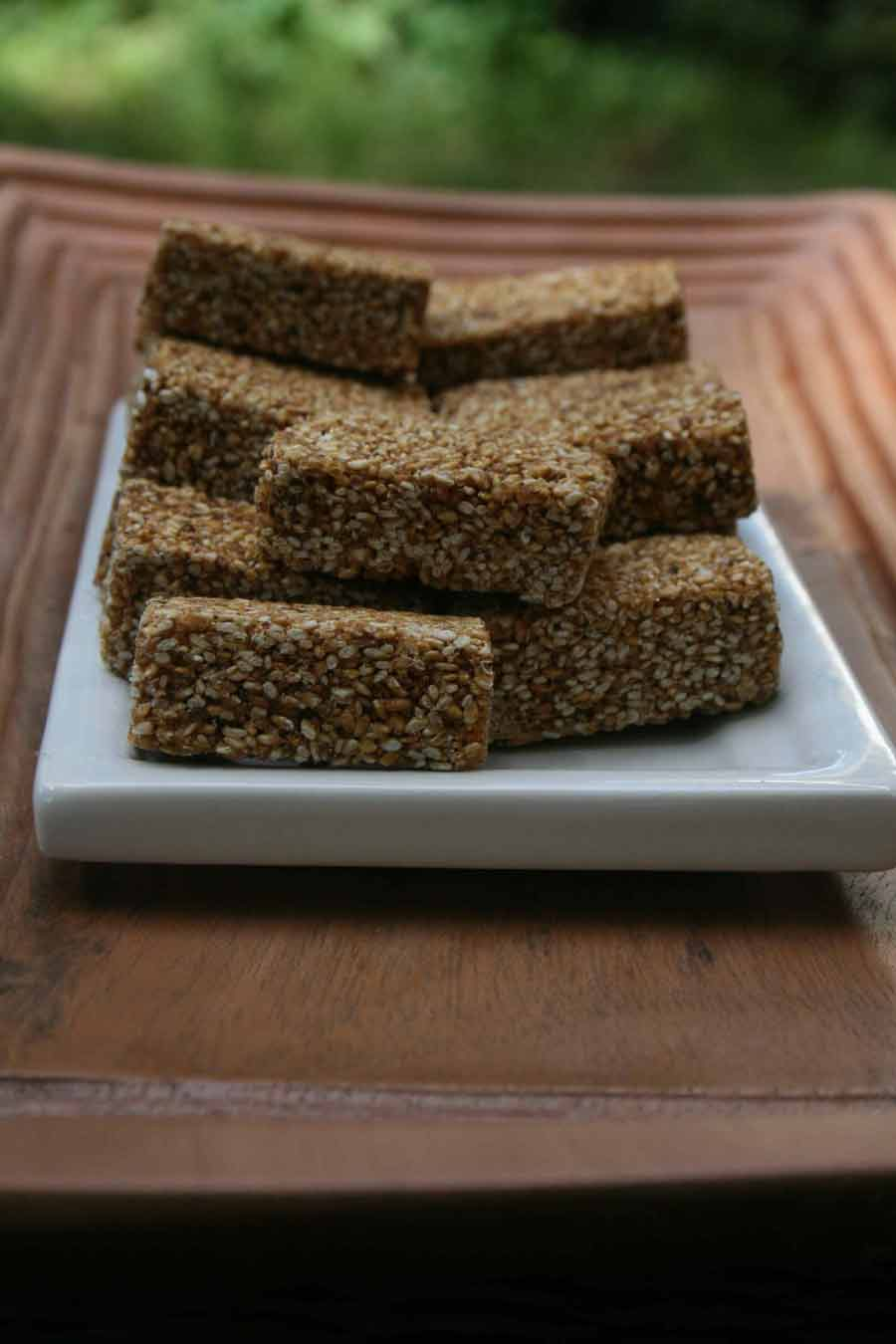
Puerto Rican sesame seed candy

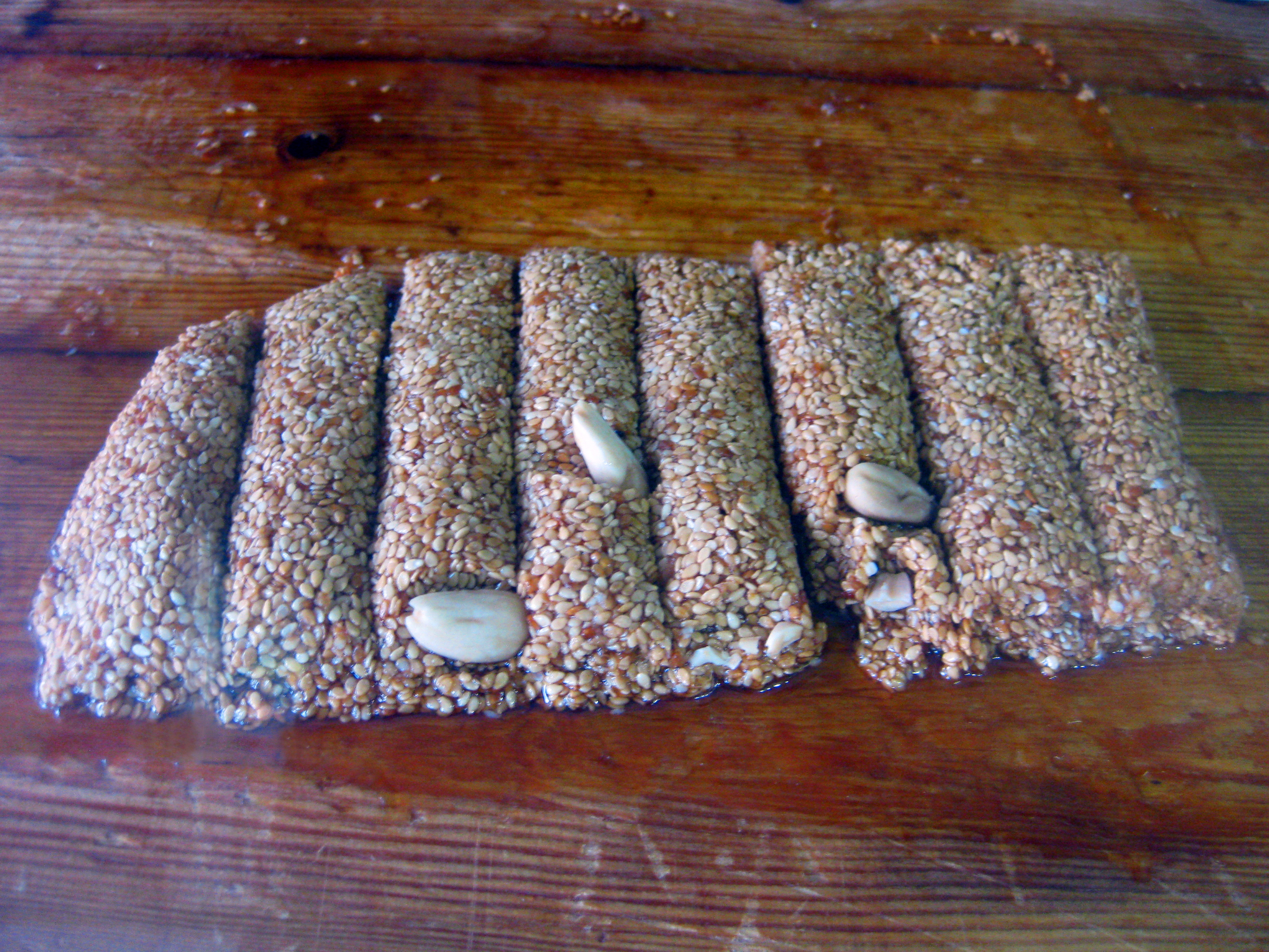
A Greek pasteli

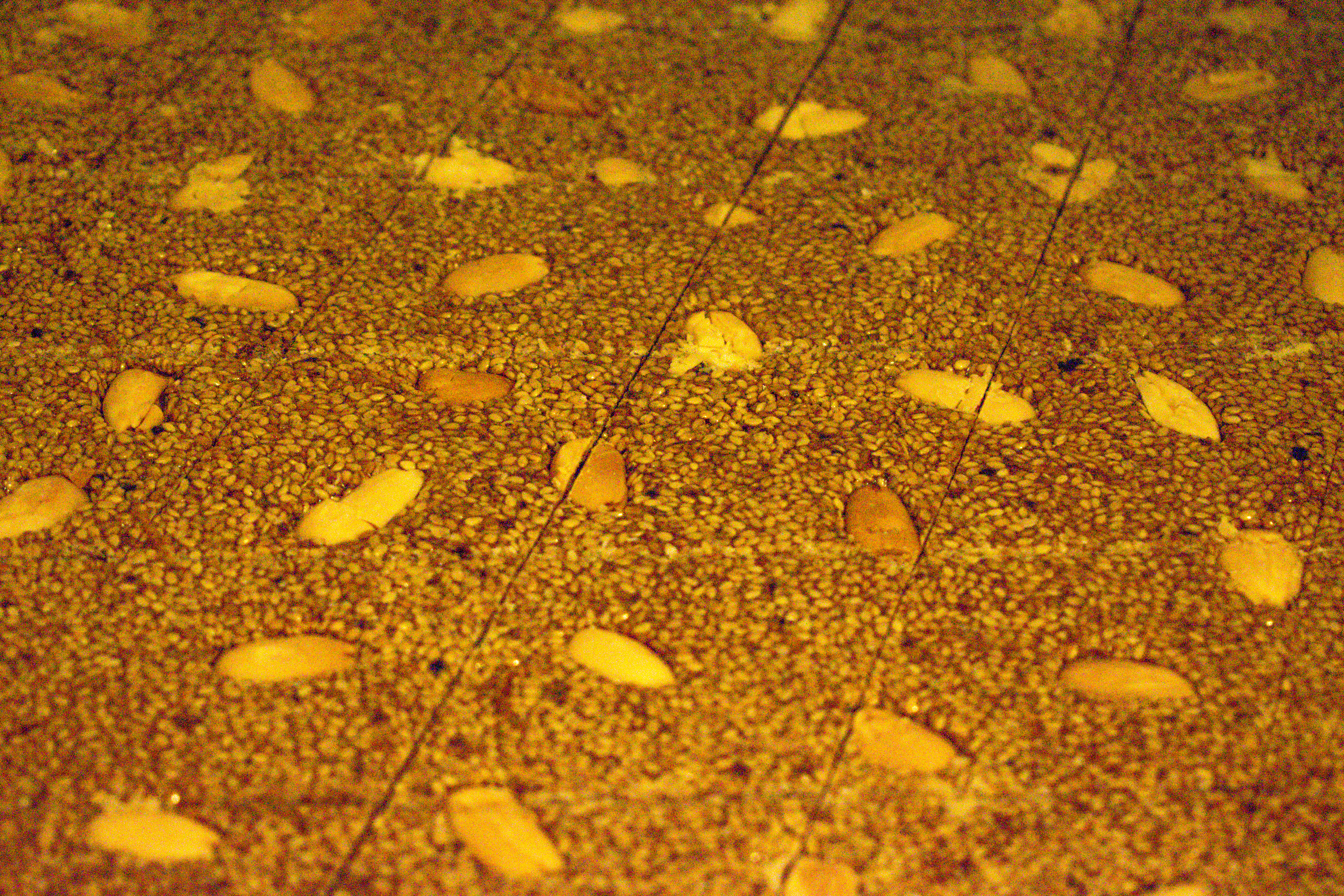
A Greek melekouni

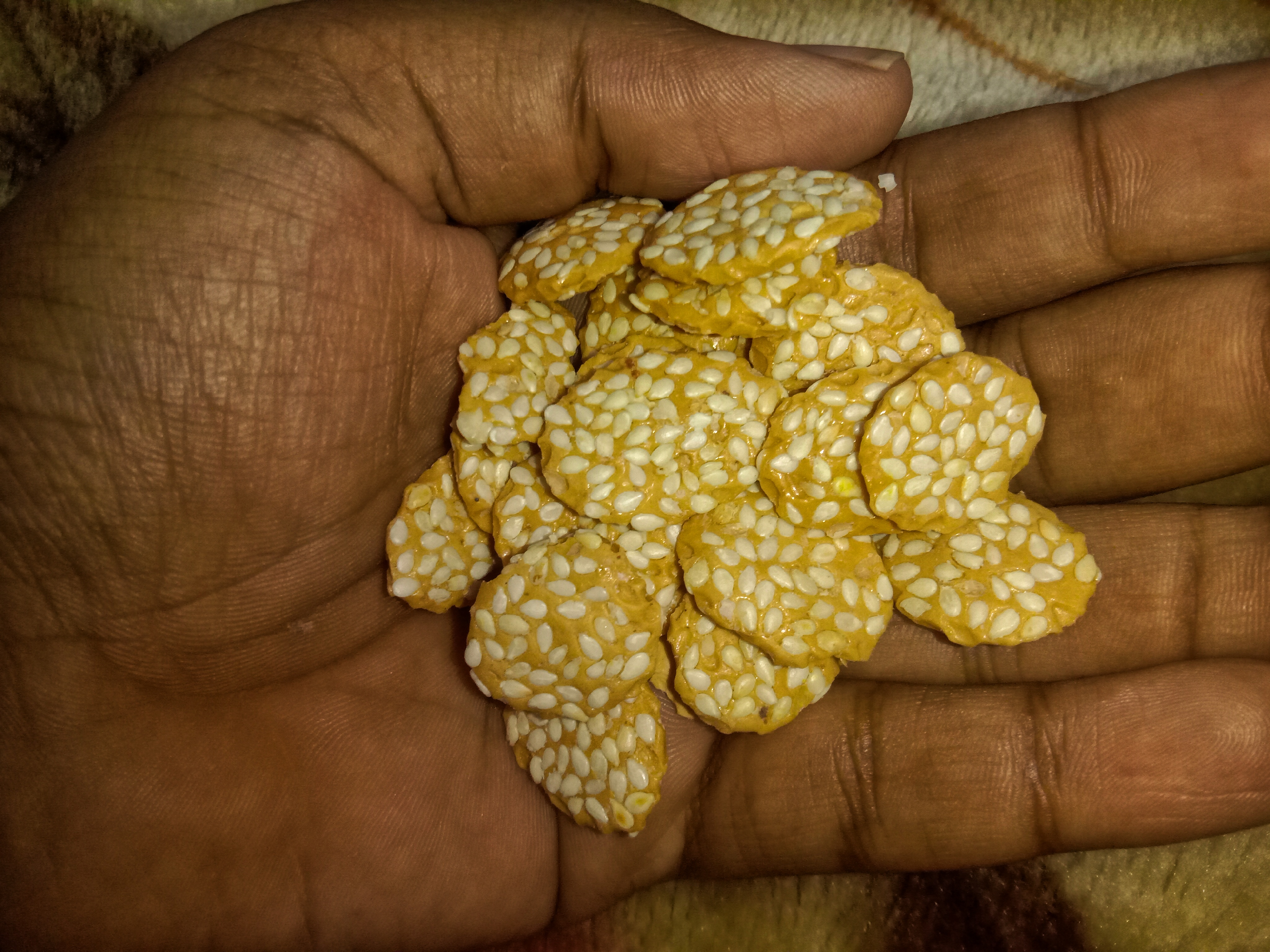
Gur Rewari ("Gud-til gajak") from India

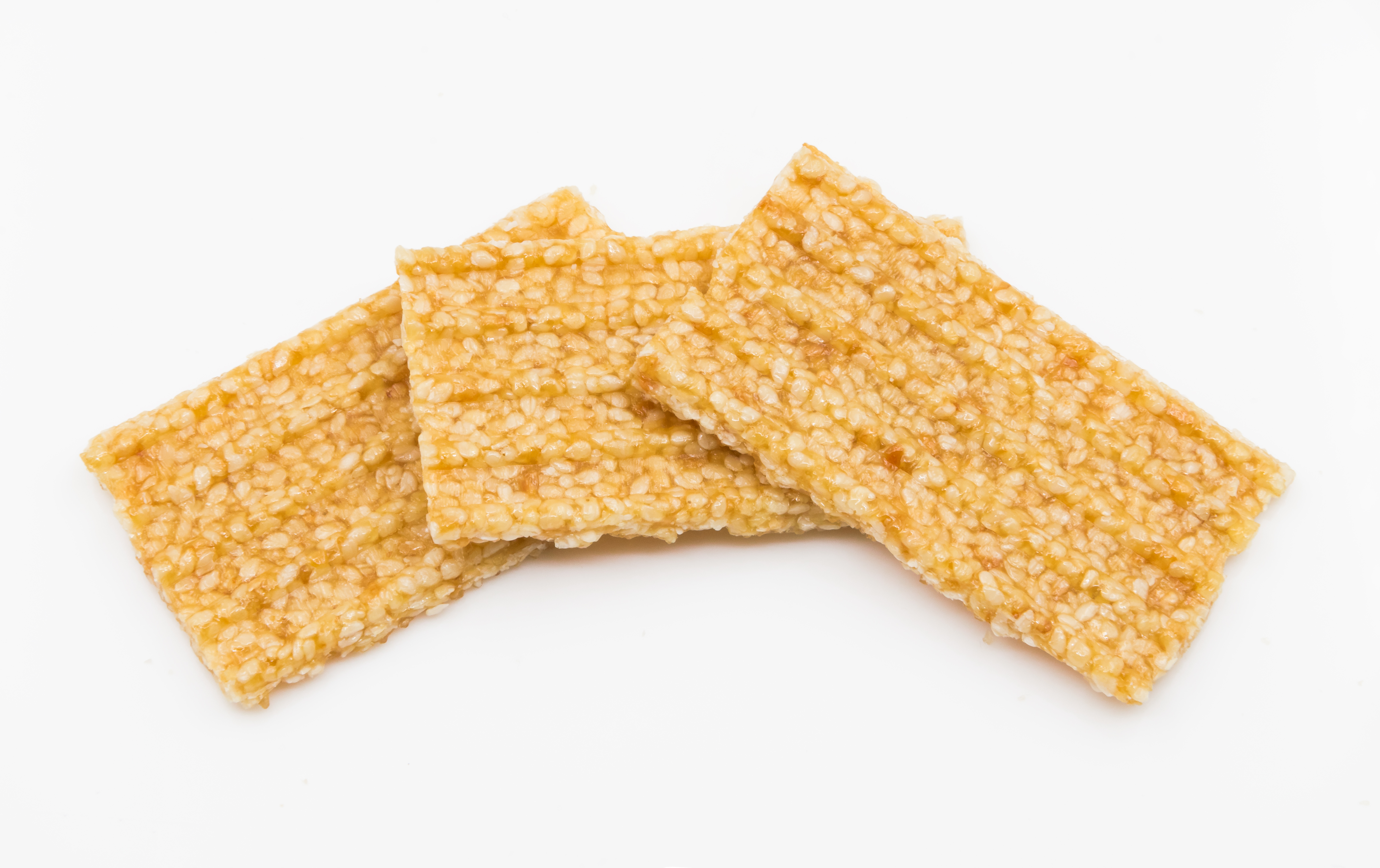
Thin wide sezamki from Poland

== See also ==
- List of sesame seed dishes
- Joyva, an American manufacturer of Sesame Crunch
- Halva
- Yeot-gangjeong
- Gozinaki
