= Black sesame roll =

Refrigerated dim sum dessert

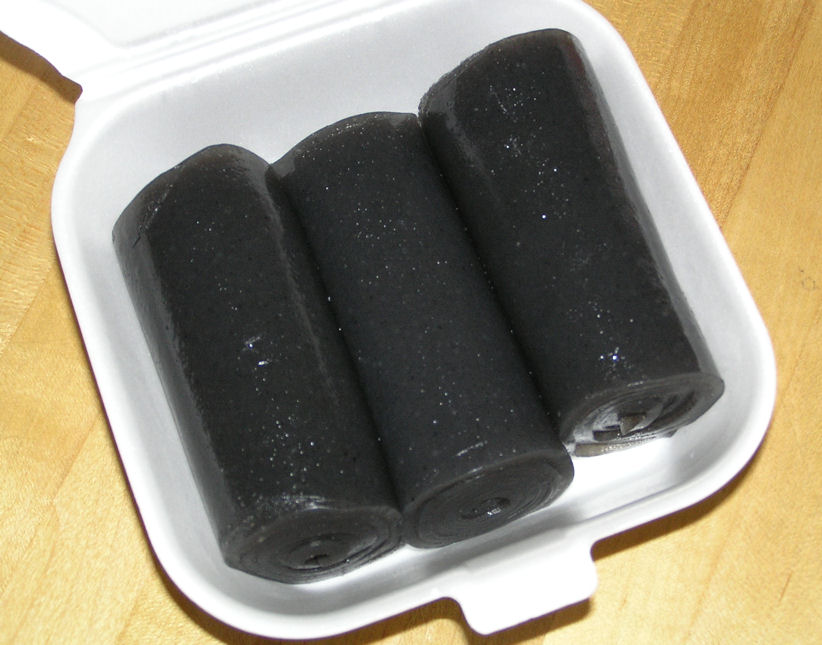
- Type: Pastry
- Place of origin: Hong Kong
- Main ingredients: Black sesame paste

Black sesame roll
- Traditional Chinese: 芝麻卷
- Literal meaning: sesame roll
Transcriptions
Standard Mandarin
- Hanyu Pinyin: zhī ma juǎn
Yue: Cantonese
- Yale Romanization: ji1 ma4 gyun2
- Jyutping: zi1 maa4 gyun2

Black Sesame Roll is one of Hong Kong's signature desserts. Sesame roll is made from black sesame, rock sugar, and water chestnut flour. Combined to create a batter, they are then steamed and rolled.

In Hong Kong, they are also known as 'Film Rolls' (菲林卷), as its appearance carries a great resemblance to rolls of exposed film.

The dessert is featured as one of the many dishes at the First Banquet of a Manchu–Han Imperial Feast.

A black sesame roll is typically rolled seven times concentrically, and that if done correctly will have a bouncy and refreshing texture. A variation of the sesame roll is the orange juice roll (橙汁卷), where it is made with concentrated orange juice and gelatin, rather than the conventional black sesame and water chestnut flour.

In the 1970s and 1980s, it was ubiquitous in many Hong Kong dim sum parlour, however it has since grown out of popularity and is now rarely found.

== Preparation ==
Grinded sesame powder is first mixed with water to create a dark sesame paste. It is then mixed with water chestnut flour and cornstarch and mixed until a silky batter is formed. The rest of the sesame paste is then boiled with sugar and quickly poured into the batter and whisked together.

Preparing a rectangular metal tray, oil is gently brushed on the tray and a thin layer of batter is poured onto the tray and steamed on high heat over water for five minutes. The thin sheet is then rolled to form the black sesame roll and cut into lengths.

== See also ==
- Banana roll
- Black sesame soup
- Dim sum
- List of sesame seed dishes
