= Changzhou sesame cake =

Traditional cake in China

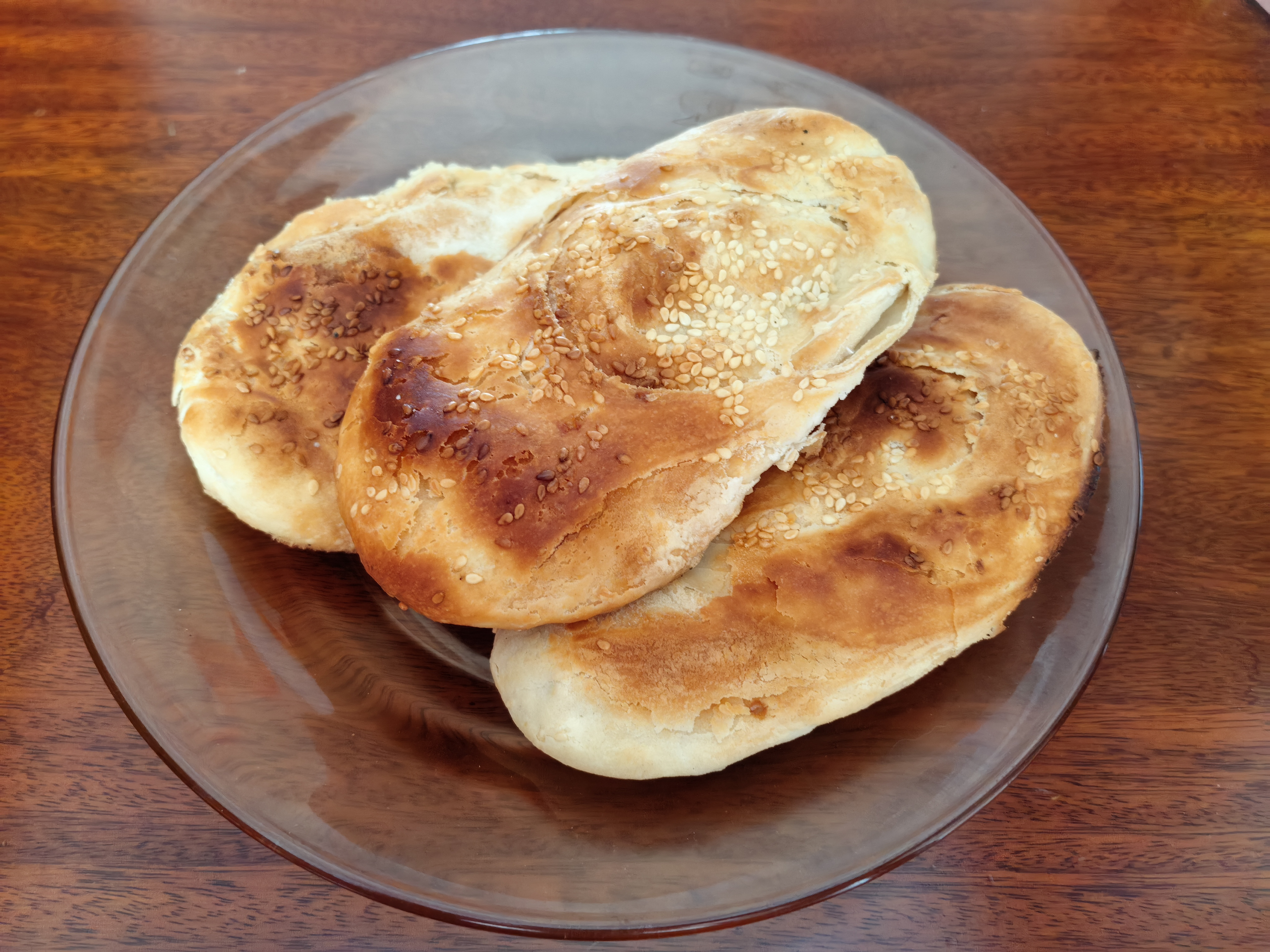
Finished cakes covered in white sesame seeds

Changzhou sesame cake (Chinese: 常州大麻糕; pinyin: Chángzhōu Dàmágāo) is a type of elliptical, baked cake that originated in Changzhou, Jiangsu supposedly over 150 years ago. Cakes are formed through several layers of yeast-fermented dough separated by lard that are flattened, stuffed, and baked with a coating of sesame seeds. Commonly eaten as a breakfast food with congee or as a street snack, they are now often bought prepackaged and given as gifts.

In September 2009, the conventional method of producing Changzhou Sesame Cake was formally recognized as part of the second batch of Jiangsu Province's Intangible Cultural Heritage.

== Preparation ==
After a dough has been formed by mixing water, oil, and wheat flour, yeast is added, and the dough undergoes fermentation. Special attention is paid to the consistency and viscosity of the dough. Afterwards, dough is cut, stuffed with a lard shortening, flattened, and rolled into a tight spiral so that many layers of lard and dough are incorporated, thus obtaining the characteristic layered flakiness of the cakes. The spirals are then filled, rounded into buns, and rolled flat into the characteristic large oval shape. Changzhou sesame cakes exist in both sweet and savory varieties; sweet fillings are made with sugar, and savory fillings are made with lard and scallion. Cakes are then covered in white and sometimes black sesame seeds and baked. Finished cakes are roughly the size of a hand. They are crisp and flaky, with a thin golden crust, and served hot.

== See also ==
- Huangqiao sesame cake
- Jin deui
- List of sesame seed dishes
