= Black sesame soup =

Chinese dessert

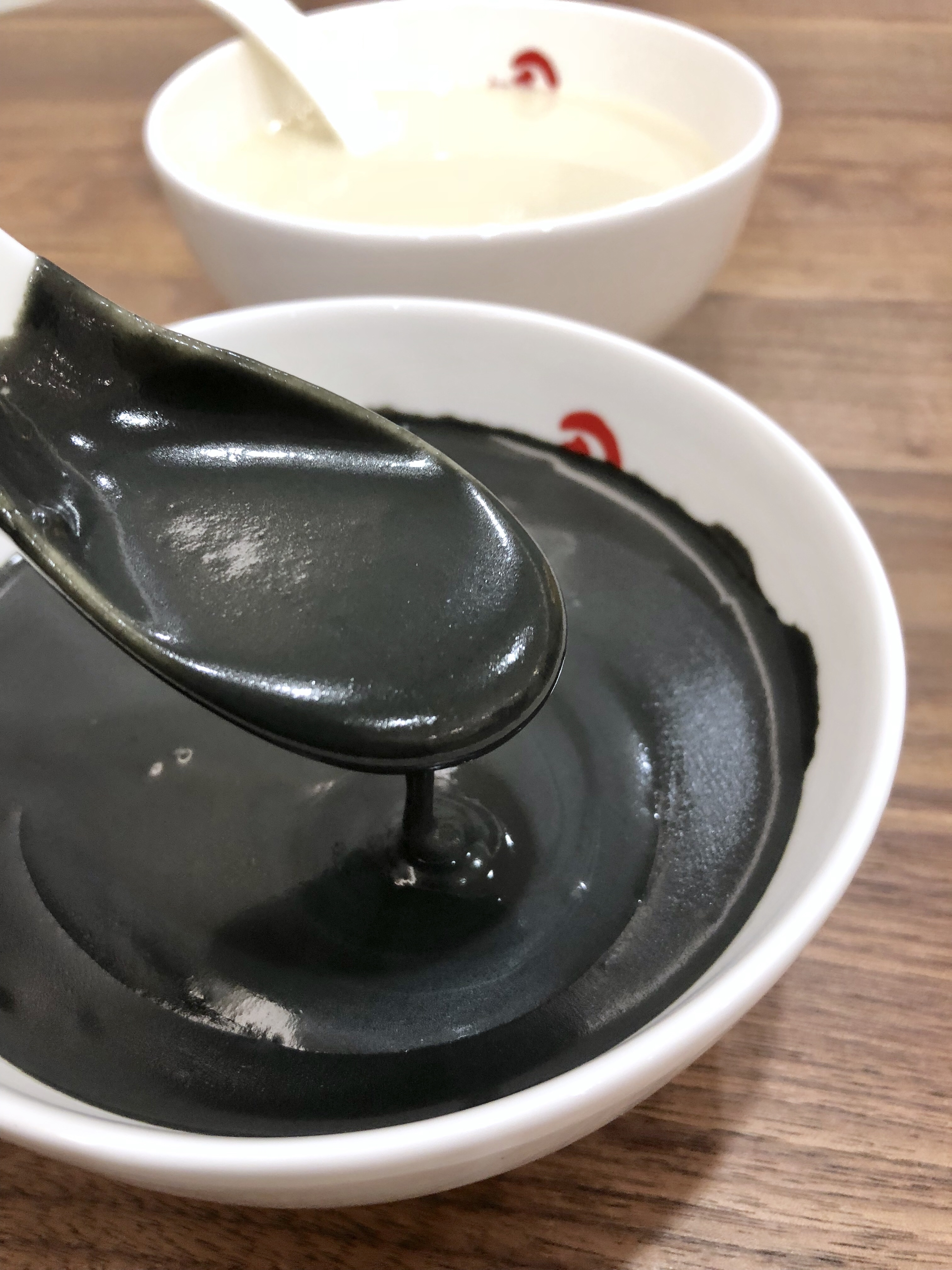
- Alternative names: 黑芝麻糊
- Type: Soup
- Course: Dessert
- Place of origin: China
- Serving temperature: Warm or Hot
- Main ingredients: Black sesame seed flour; sometimes sugar or tangyuan

Black sesame soup
- Chinese: 芝麻糊
- Literal meaning: sesame paste
Transcriptions
Standard Mandarin
- Hanyu Pinyin: zhīmahú, zhīmahù
Yue: Cantonese
- Jyutping: zi1maa4wu4*2

Alternative Chinese name
- Chinese: 黑芝麻糊
- Literal meaning: black sesame paste
Transcriptions
Standard Mandarin
- Hanyu Pinyin: hēi zhīmahú, hēi zhīmahù,
Yue: Cantonese
- Jyutping: hak1zi1maa4wu4*2

Black sesame soup (sesame tong sui) is a popular Chinese dessert widely available throughout China. It is typically served hot. In Cantonese cuisine, it takes the form of tong sui, or sweet soup (similar to Western pudding), with greater viscosity. The main ingredients are black sesame seeds, rice and water. Sugar is added for sweetness. Tangyuan is sometimes added to black sesame soup.

== Ingredients ==
The main ingredients are: white rice (long grain or short grain), toasted black sesame seeds, water (amount depending on the desired consistency), and granulated sugar (based on personal preferences).

Additional ingredients are often added to this soup such as: millet, black rice, barley, maize, black beans, red beans, soy beans, yam or other whole grains.

== Nutrition ==
The soup offers useful quantities of Iron, magnesium, manganese, copper, calcium, vitamin B1, vitamin E, phytic acid, phytosterols and sesamin.

Calories per serving of black sesame seed soup, serving size 1 cup (~240 mL), is about 213 calories (128 calories from sesame seeds, 61 calories from granulated sugar, 24 calories from white rice).

Traditional Chinese medicinal practices use sesame to warm the body, replenish blood, relax bowels, and nourish hair. For medical use, it is said to be suitable for the treatment of physical weakness such as anemia, constipation, dizziness, and tinnitus.

== See also ==
- Heugimja-juk
- List of Chinese soups
- List of sesame seed dishes
- List of soups
- Red bean soup
