= Sesame chicken =

Chicken dish

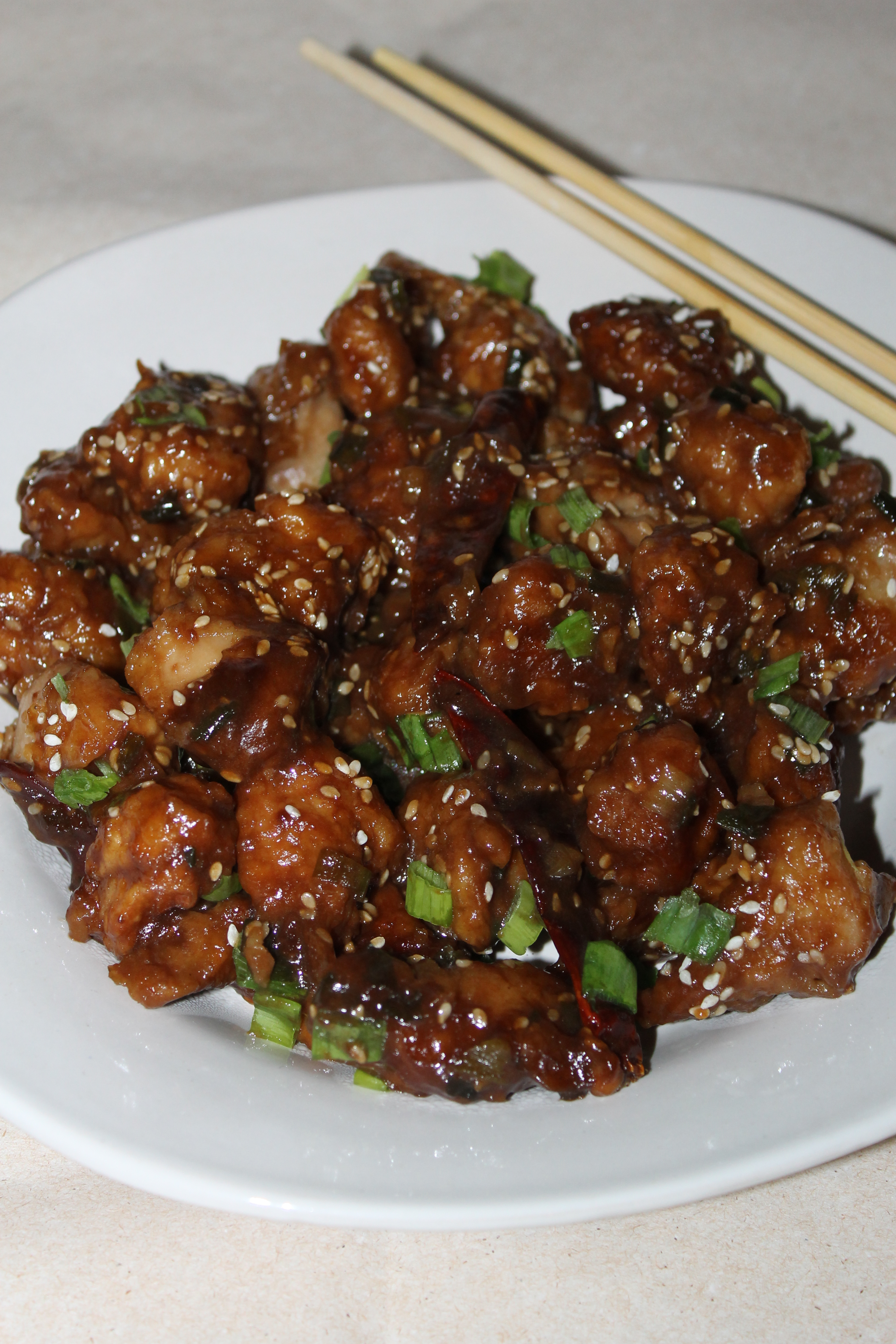
- Chinese sesame chicken
- Traditional Chinese: 芝麻雞
Transcriptions
Standard Mandarin
- Hanyu Pinyin: zhīma jī
- IPA: [ʈʂɻ̩́ma]
Yue: Cantonese
- Yale Romanization: ji màah gaì
- Jyutping: zi1 maa4 gai1
- IPA: [tɕīː mȁː kɐ̂i]

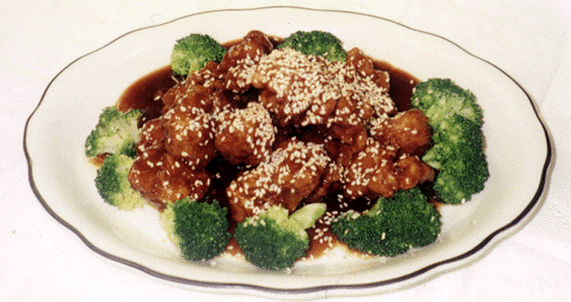
A dish of Chinese sesame seed chicken, displayed with steamed broccoli, white rice, and sesame seeds, all served on the traditional white Chinese plate

Sesame chicken is a dish commonly found in Chinese restaurants throughout the United States and Canada. The dish is similar to General Tso's chicken but the taste of the Chinese-based chicken is not spicy.

== Description ==
The dish involves chicken pieces (usually from the thighs) that are de-boned, battered and Chinese deep-fried, then dressed with a translucent, reddish-brown, semi-thick, somewhat sweet sauce made from corn starch, vinegar, wine or sake, chicken broth and sugar, the last of which is a major contributor to sesame chicken's relative sweetness. After these preparations, the unfinished dish is topped with small sesame seeds, which may or may not be toasted, hence the name sesame chicken. It is sometimes, but not always, served with vegetables such as broccoli and baby corn.

=== Variations ===
Sesame shrimp is also a popular variation of sesame chicken. Shrimp is simply substituted for chicken. Preparation of this dish is the same, with the exception of the degree and length of heating of the meat. Some restaurants serve sesame tofu.

Another potential difference is that chopped almonds may be substituted for the sesame seeds, hence the name almond shrimp.

== See also ==
- List of chicken dishes
- List of sesame seed dishes
