= List of sesame seed dishes =

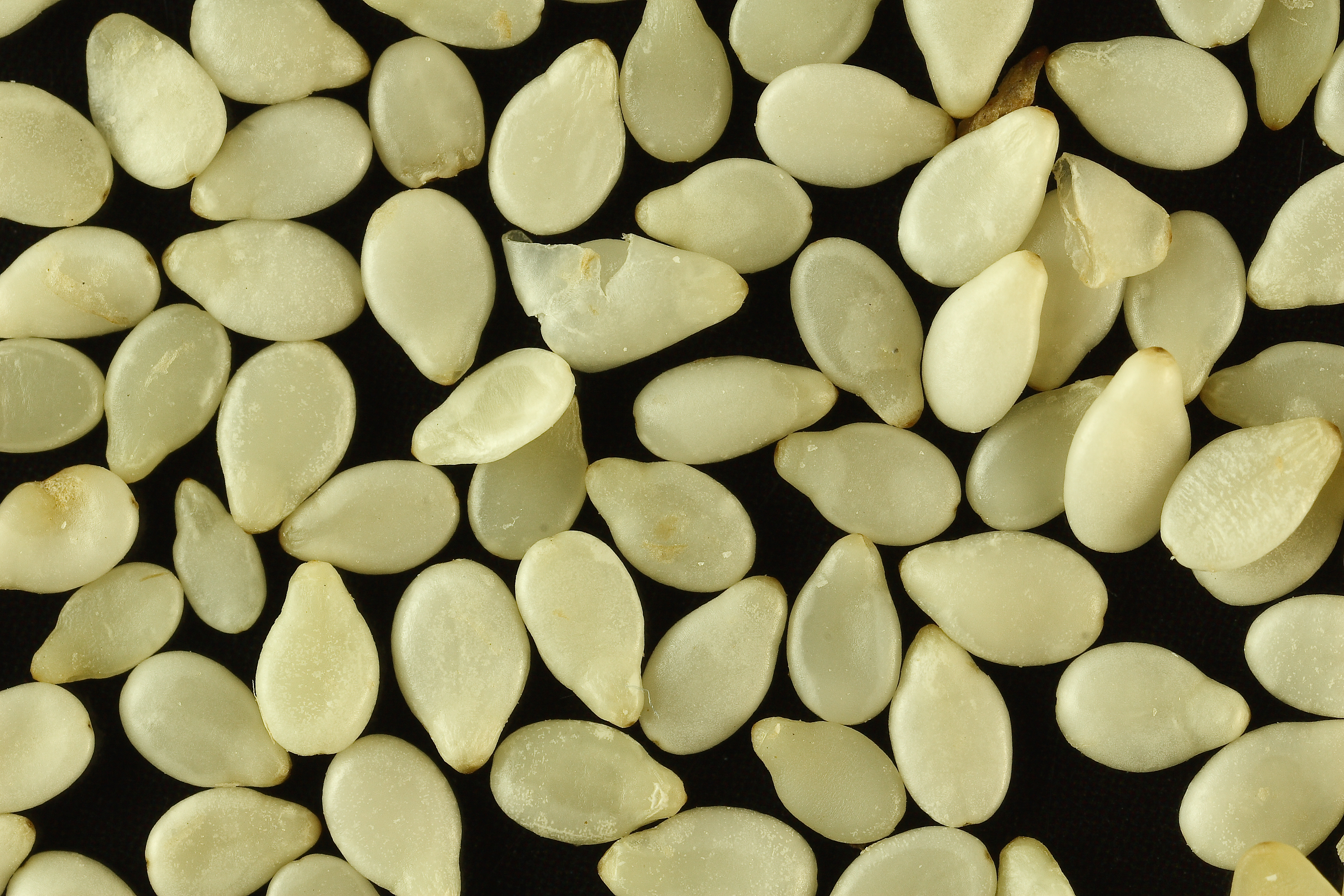
A magnified view of sesame seeds

This is a list of notable sesame seed dishes and foods, which are prepared using sesame seed as a main ingredient. Sesame seed is a common ingredient in various cuisines, and is used whole in cooking for its rich, nutty flavor. It is also a potent allergen.

== Sesame-seed dishes and foods ==
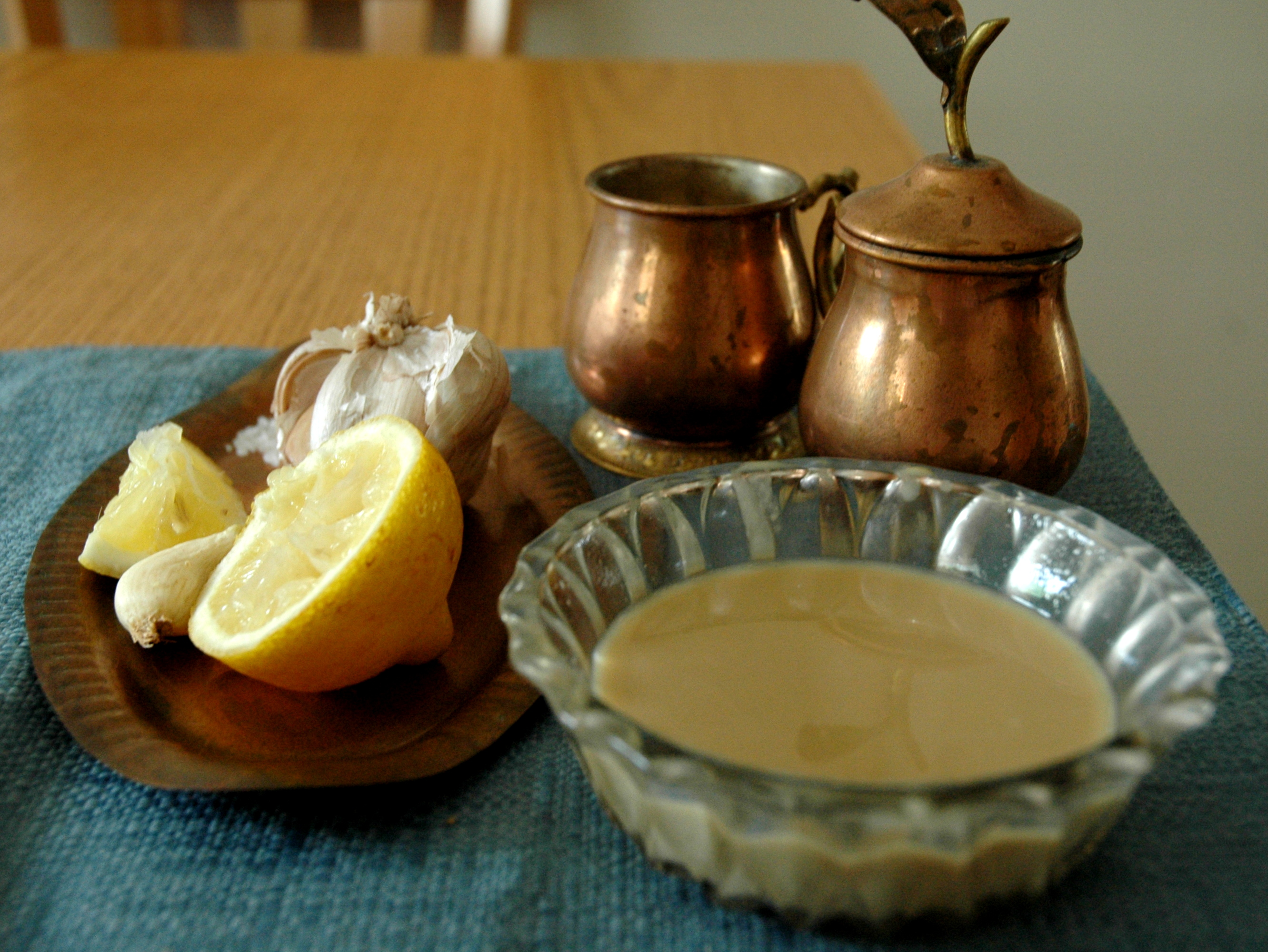
Tahini with lemon and garlic

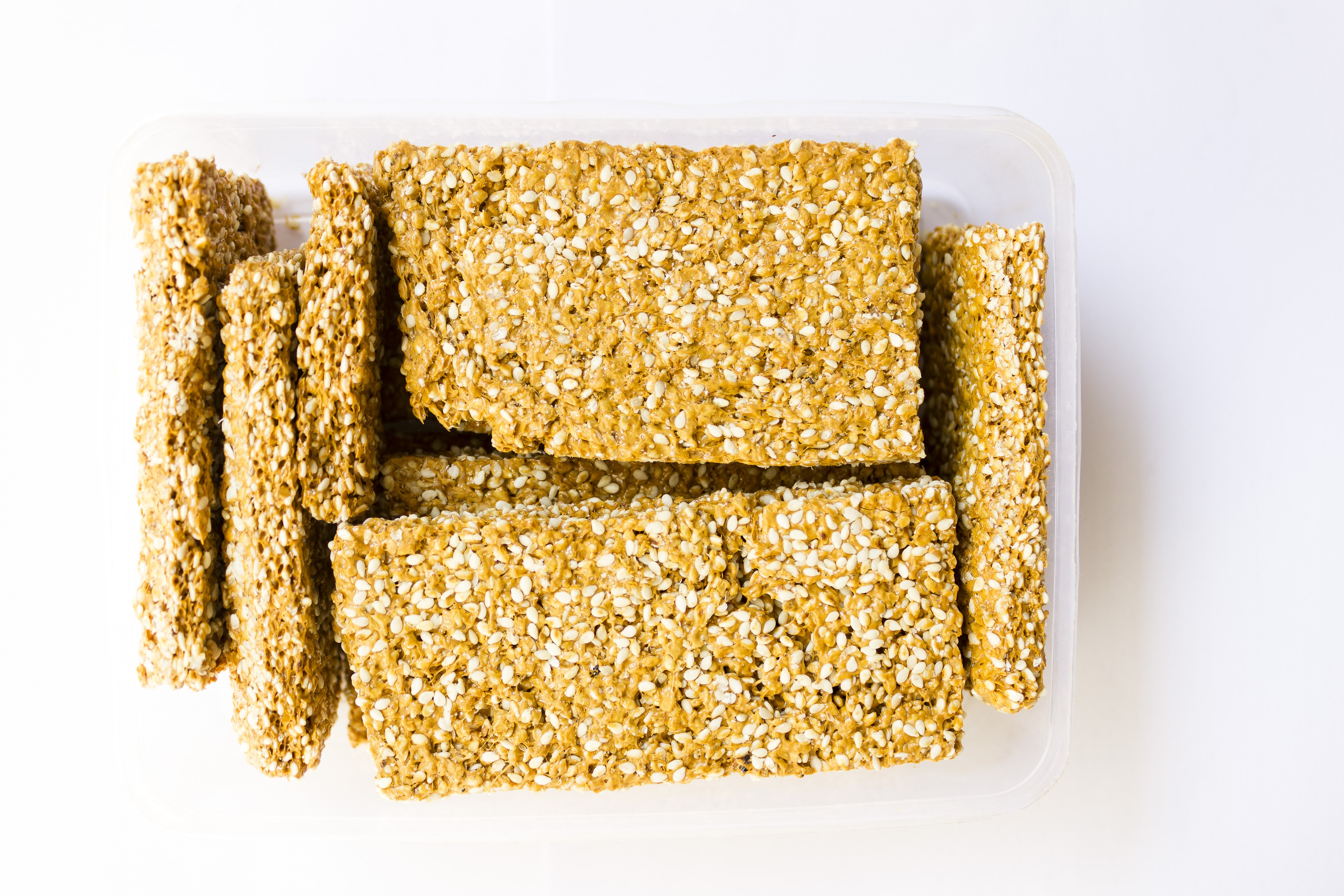
Tilkut

- Παστέλι (Pasteli = sesame seed crunchy candy) In Greece and Cyprus, sesame seed candy is called pasteli and is generally a flat, oblong bar made with honey and often including nuts. Though the modern name παστέλι pasteli is of Italian origin, very similar foods are documented in Ancient Greek cuisine: the Cretan koptoplakous (κοπτοπλακοῦς) or gastris (γάστρις) was a layer of ground nuts sandwiched between two layers of sesame crushed with honey. Herodotus also mentions "sweet cakes of sesame and honey", but with no detail.
- Barazek - a Levantine cookie primarily made from sesame and often other nuts like pistachio
- Benne ball – a Trinidadian and Tobagonian sesame-based dessert invented by Afro-Trinidadians. It is ball-shaped, and has a very hard consistency.
- Benne wafer – a wafer-like cookie made primarily from sesame seed and sesame flour. Very popular in Charleston, South Carolina. The sesame seed, also called "benne," is thought have been brought to colonial American by West African slaves.
- Binangkal – a doughnut from the islands of Visayas and Mindanao in the Philippines, made from deep-fried dense dough balls coated with sesame seeds. It is usually eaten with hot chocolate or coffee.
- Black sesame roll – a refrigerated dim sum dessert found in Hong Kong and some overseas Chinatowns. It is sweet and the texture is smooth and soft.
- Black sesame soup – a popular east-Asian and Chinese dessert widely available throughout China, Hong Kong and Singapore.
- Chikki – a traditional Indian sweet sometimes prepared using sesame seeds
- Furikake – a dry Japanese seasoning meant to be sprinkled on top of cooked rice, vegetables, and fish. It typically consists of a mixture of dried and ground fish, sesame seeds, chopped seaweed, sugar, salt, and monosodium glutamate.
- Funchi criollo – a soup made from sesame paste, broth, with dumplings made from taro, yams, green and sweet plantains. The dish is important to Afro-Puerto Rican culture and is related to mofongo.
- Gajak – a dessert originating at Bhind and Morena of Madhya Pradesh, India where it is most commonly consumed in the winter months. It is a dry sweet made of sesame seeds, ground nuts and jaggery.
- Goma-ae – a Japanese side dish made with vegetables and sesame dressing (goma meaning sesame and ae meaning sauce in Japanese).
- Gomashio – a dry condiment made from unhulled sesame seeds.
- Heugimja-juk – black sesame porridge, a juk (porridge) made from finely ground black sesame and rice. The bittersweet, nutty porridge is good for recovering patients, as black sesame seeds are rich in digestive enzymes that help with healthy liver and kidney functions.
- Horchata de ajonjolí – a drink from Puerto Rico made using toasted sesame seeds and spices.
- Injeolmi – a variety of tteok, or Korean rice cake, sometimes prepared using sesame seeds.
- Jian dui – a fried Chinese pastry made from glutinous rice flour, coated with sesame seeds on the outside; it is crisp and chewy.
- Ka'ak – can refer to a bread commonly consumed throughout the Near East that is made in a large ring shape and covered with sesame seeds.
- Tahini – a condiment made from toasted ground hulled sesame seeds. Tahini is served as a dip on its own or as a major component of hummus, baba ghanoush, and halva.
- Tilkut – a sweet made in the Indian states of Bihar and Jharkhand, it is made of pounded 'tila' or sesame seeds (Sesamum indicum) and jaggery or sugar.
- Sesame halva – sweet confections popular in the Balkans, Poland, the Middle East, and other areas surrounding the Mediterranean Sea.
- Sesame-seed cake – a cake made of sesame seeds, often combined with honey as a sweetener.
  - Changzhou sesame cake – a type of elliptical, baked cake that originated in Changzhou, Jiangsu, China supposedly over 150 years ago.
  - Huangqiao sesame cake – a sesame-seed cake that originated from Huangqiao town in Taixing, Jiangsu. It has been speculated to be one of the oldest cakes in the Taizhou region of China.
- Sesame-seed candy – a confection of sesame seeds and sugar or honey pressed into a bar or ball, it is popular from the Middle East through South Asia to East Asia.
  - Changzhou sesame candy – a traditional cookie in places such as Changzhou, China.
  - Gofio de ajonjolí – a typical Puerto Rican sweet made from roasted corn, sesame seeds, and brown sugar.
  - Mampostial – a Puerto Rican candy bar known as "black coconut" (in English) made using coconut, brown sugar, honey, vanilla, cinnamon, molasses, and sesame seeds.
  - Marrallo – a sweet empanada made from the same ingredients as mampostial, it is a popular street food snack.
  - Pilones de ajonjolí – a pilones is a lollipop that made using sesame seeds, honey, and fruit juice or coconut milk typically sold in Puerto Rican convenient stores.
  - Til ke Laddu – a colourful sesame-seed candy coated with sesame seeds, also called tiler naru in West Bengal and tilgul in Maharashtra and popularly eaten during Makar Sankranti.
- Sesame chicken - a Chinese dish.
Sesame-seed dishes and foods

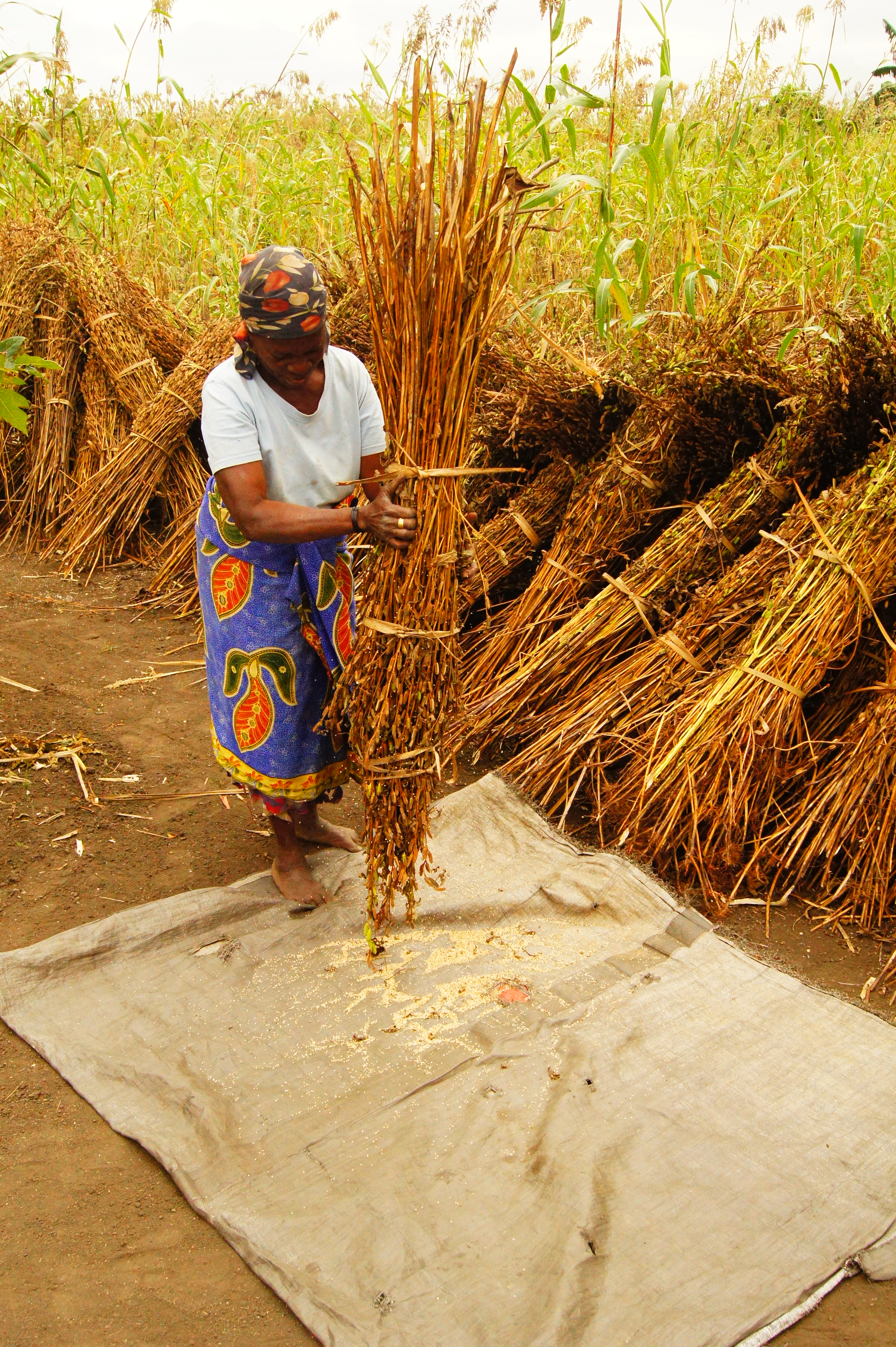
Sesame seeds being harvested in Mozambique

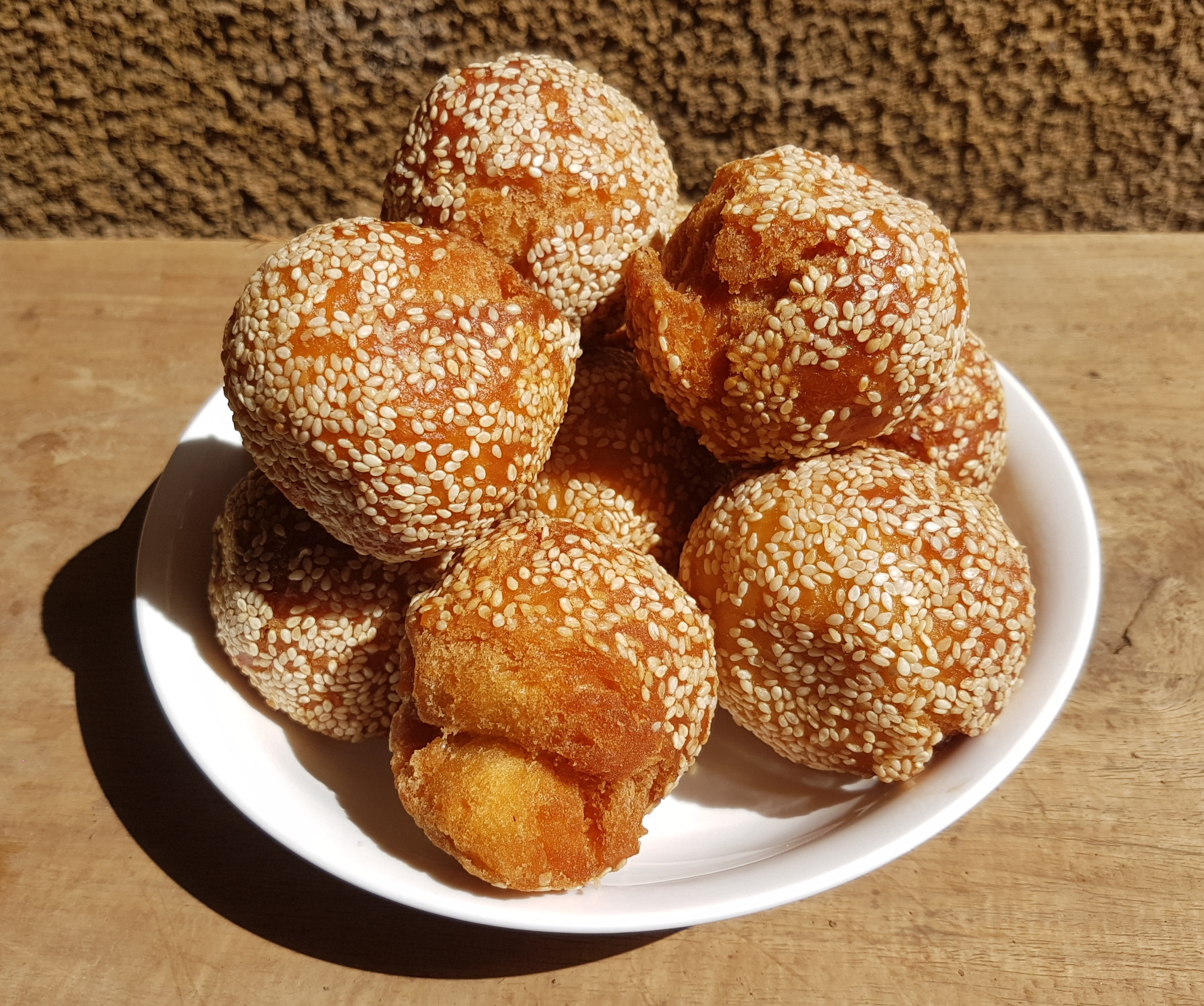
Binangkal

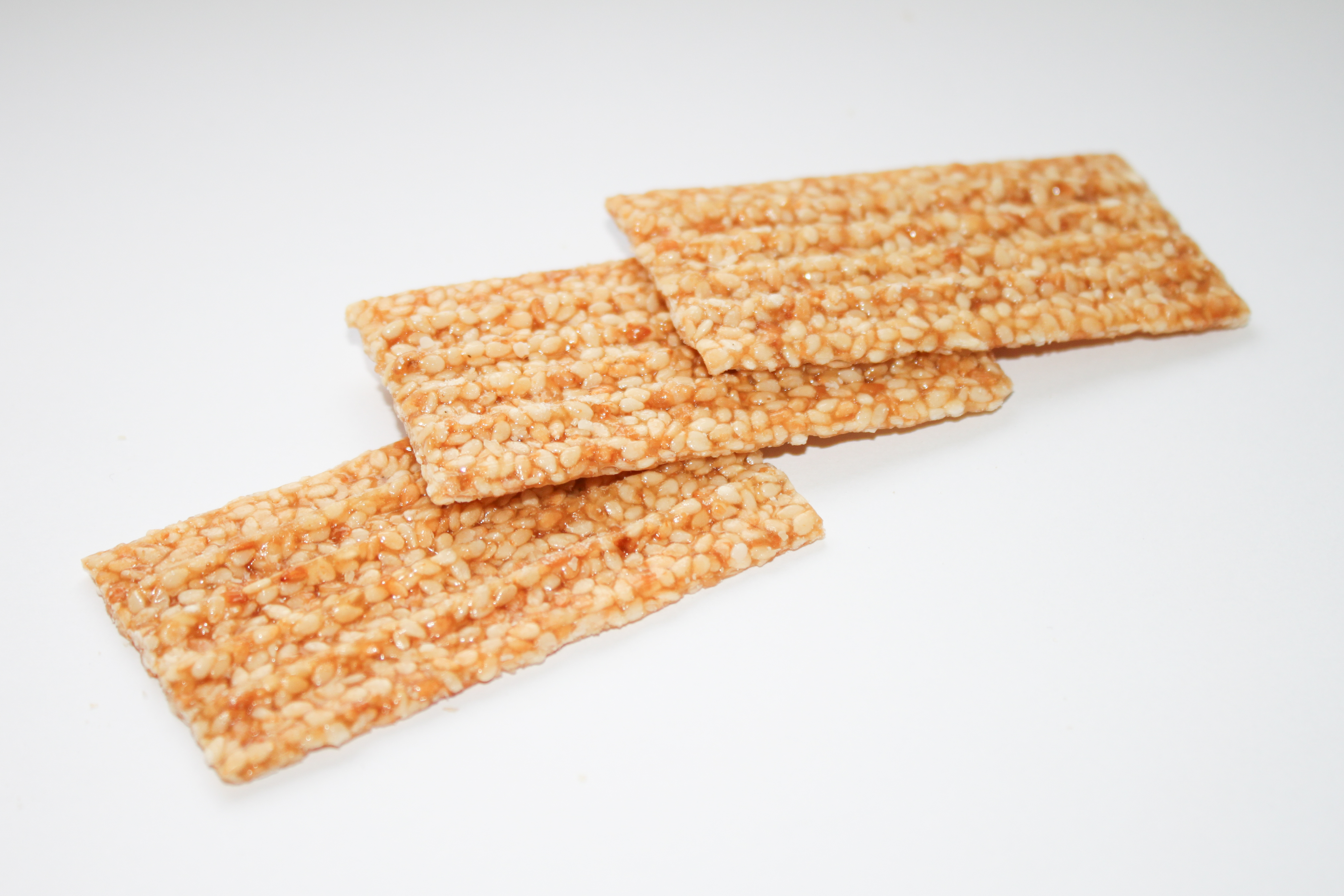
Halo! brand sesame seed biscuits

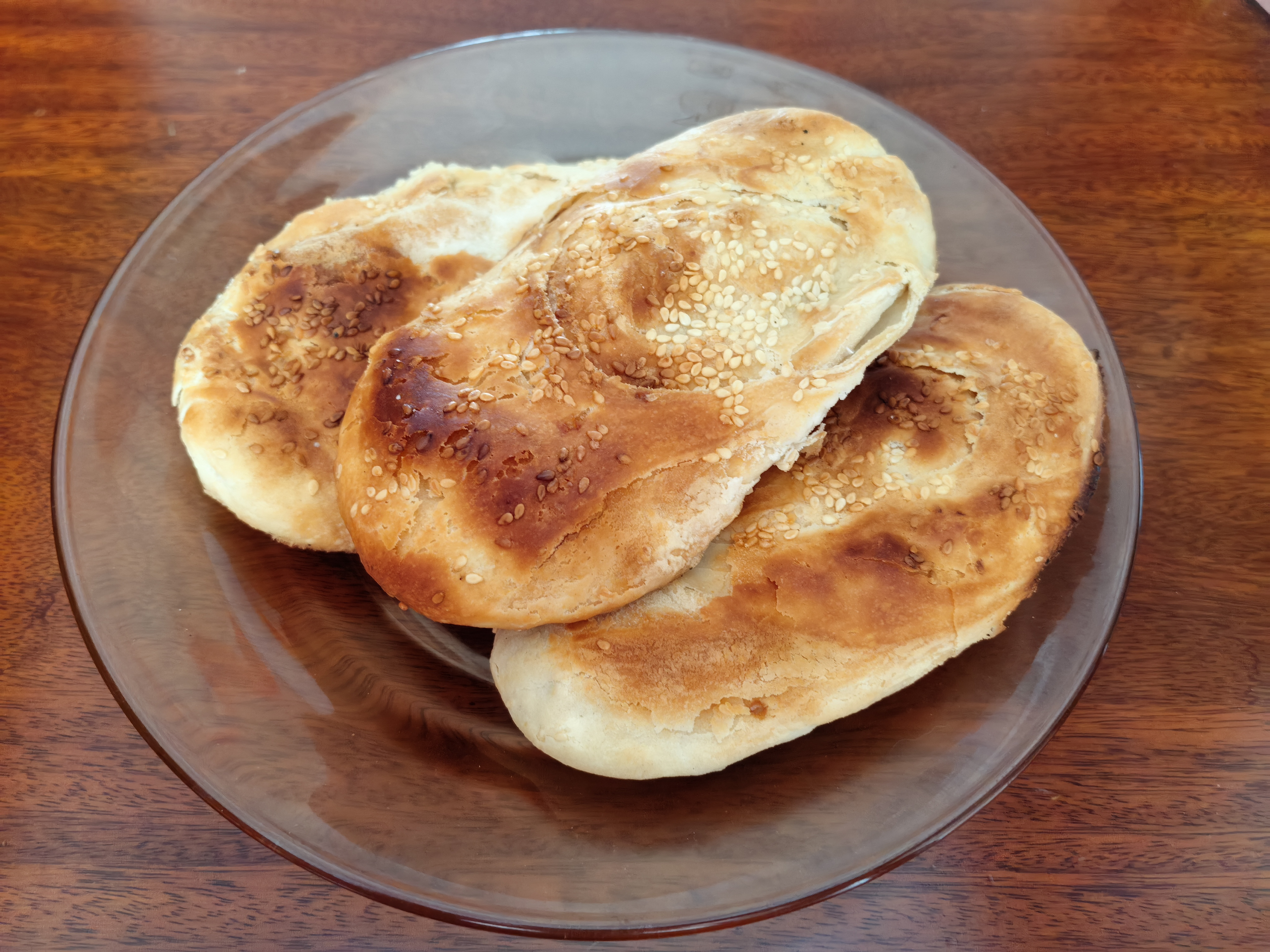
Changzhou Sesame Cakes

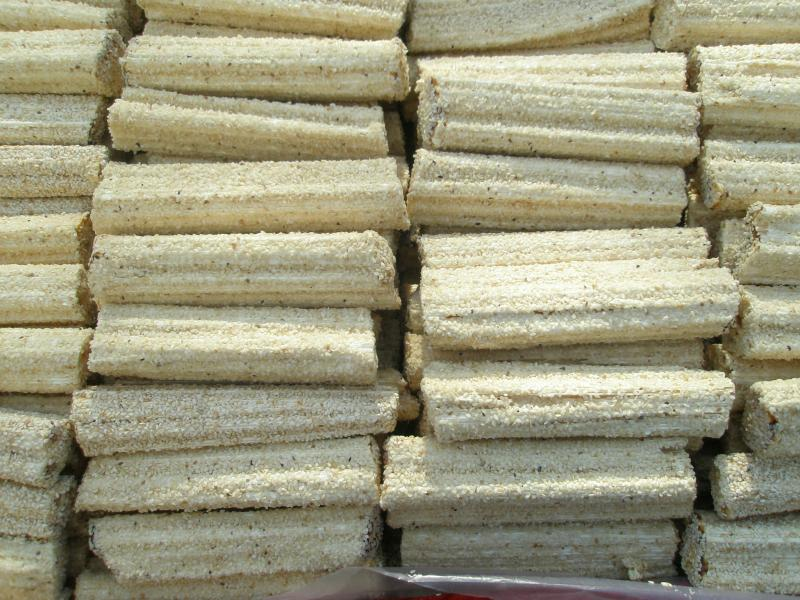
Changzhou sesame candy

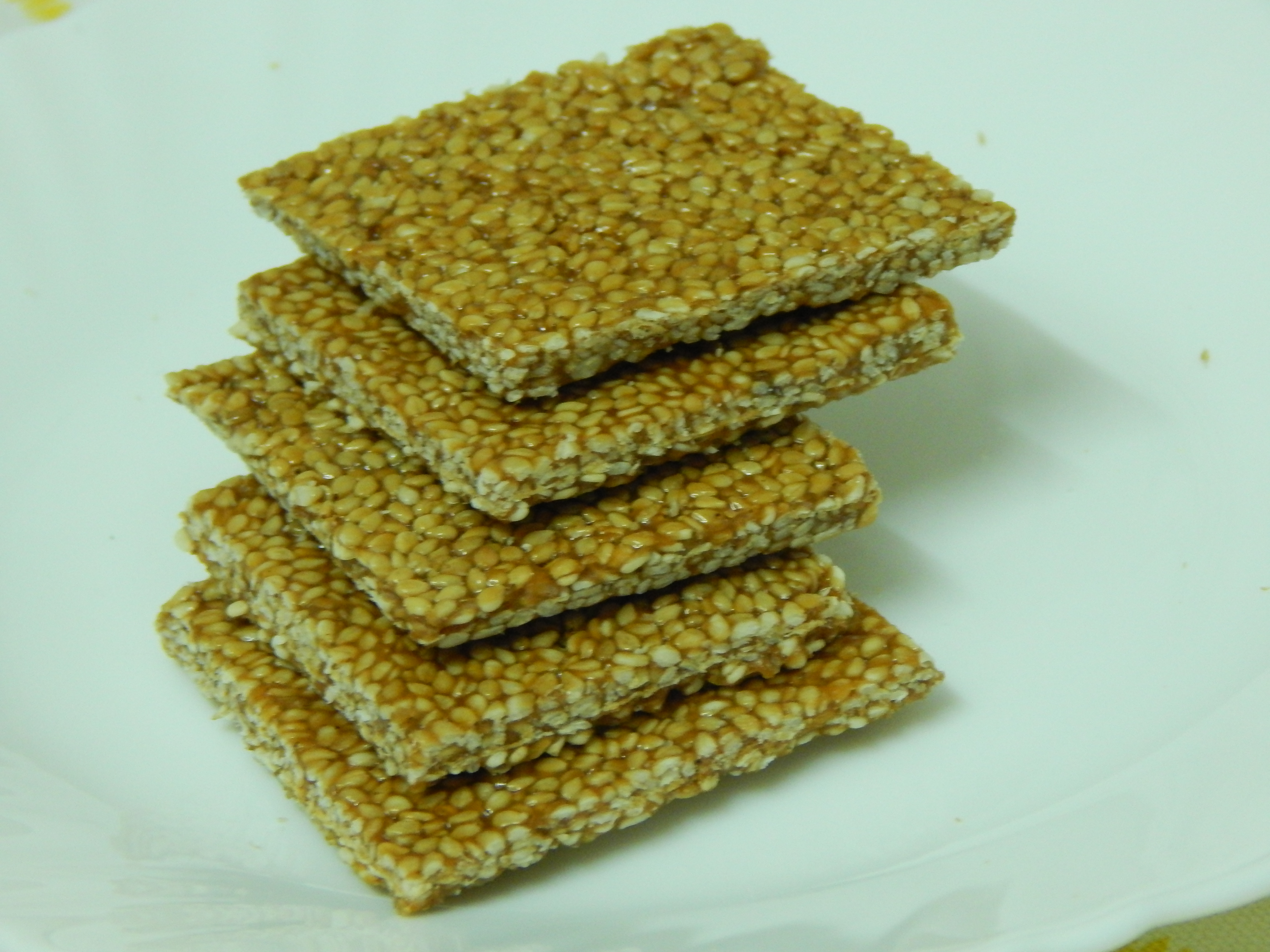
Sesame-seed chikki

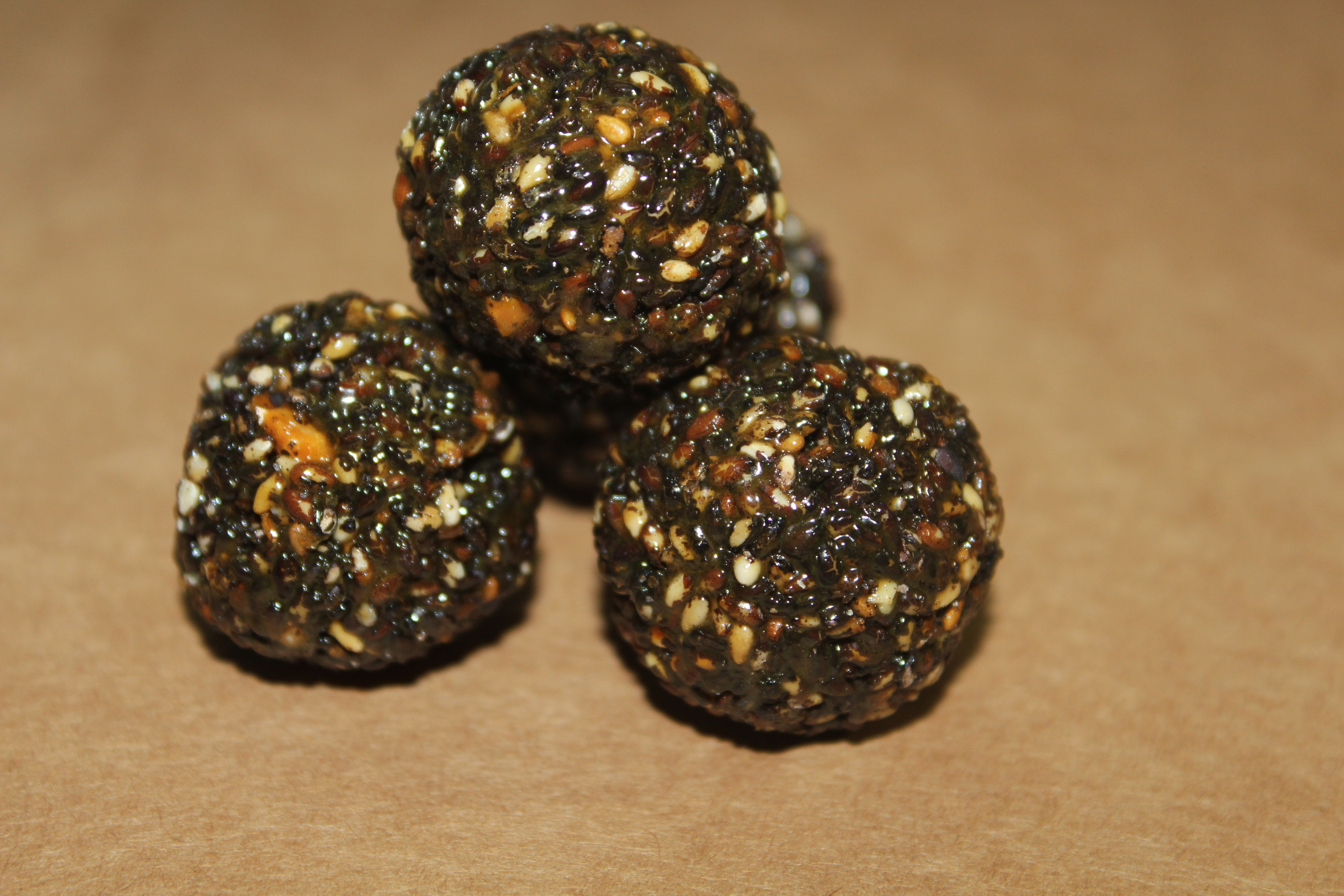
Ellunda

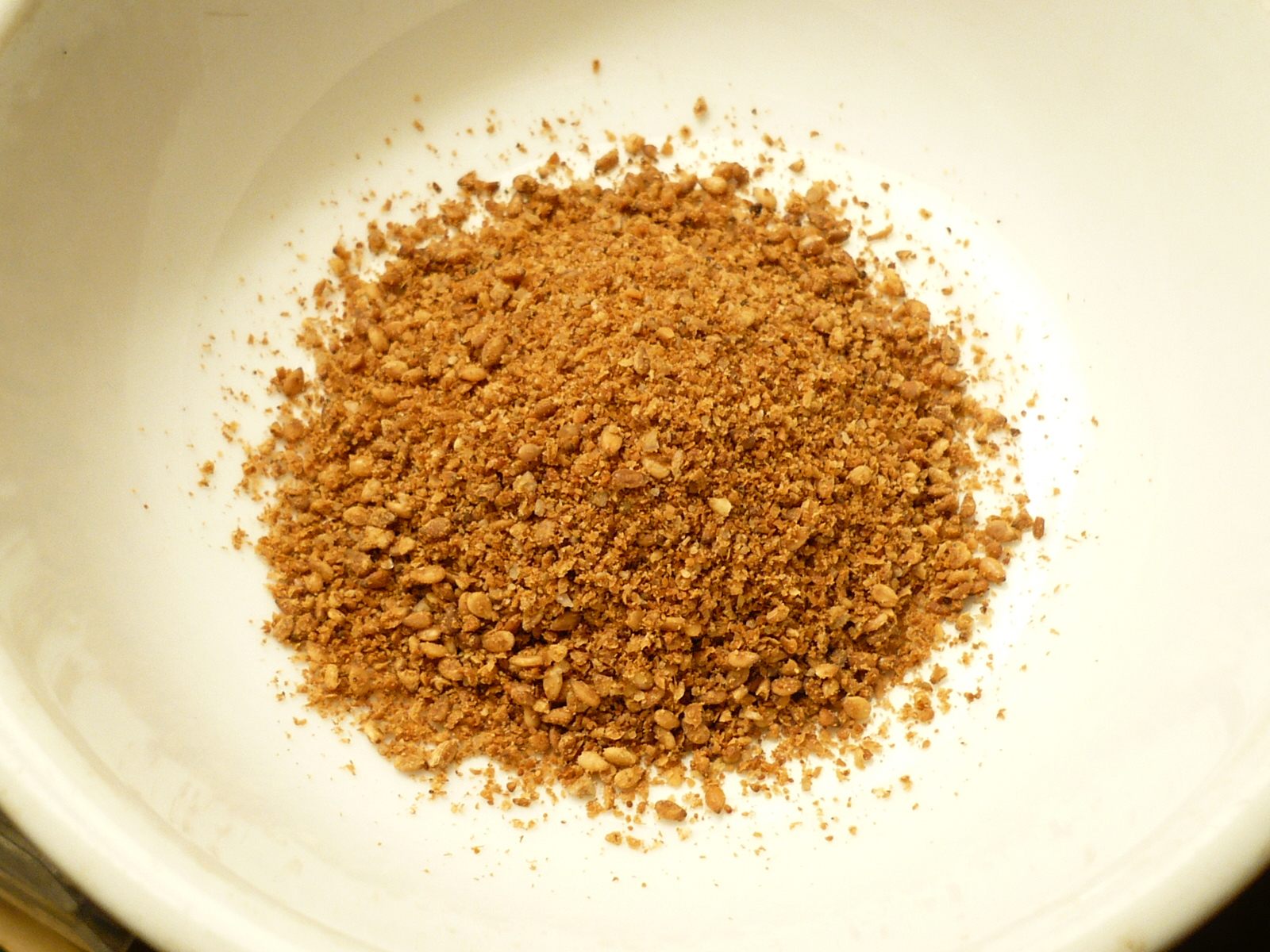
Gomashio

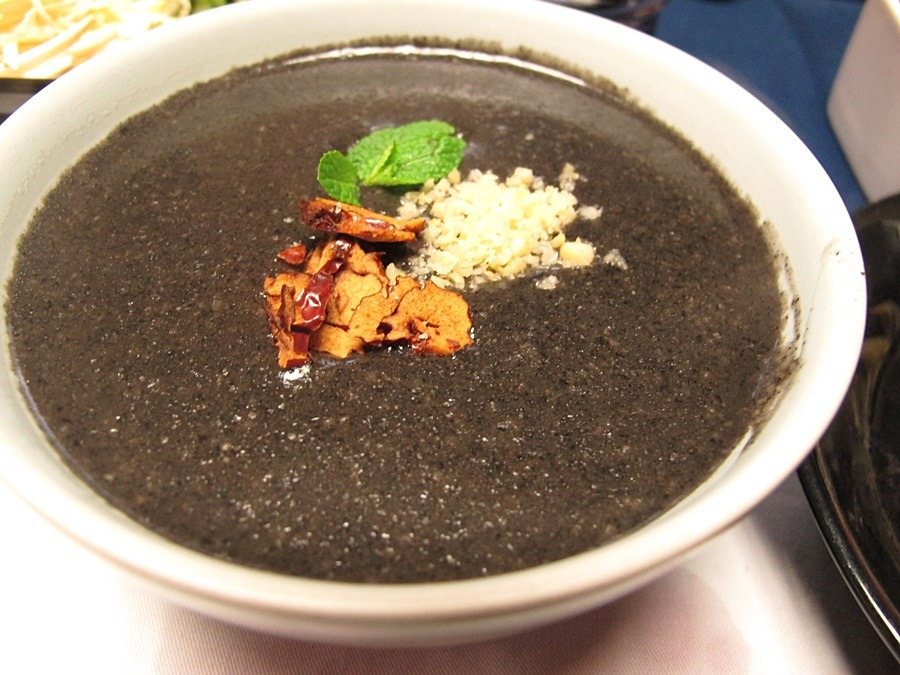
Heugimja-juk

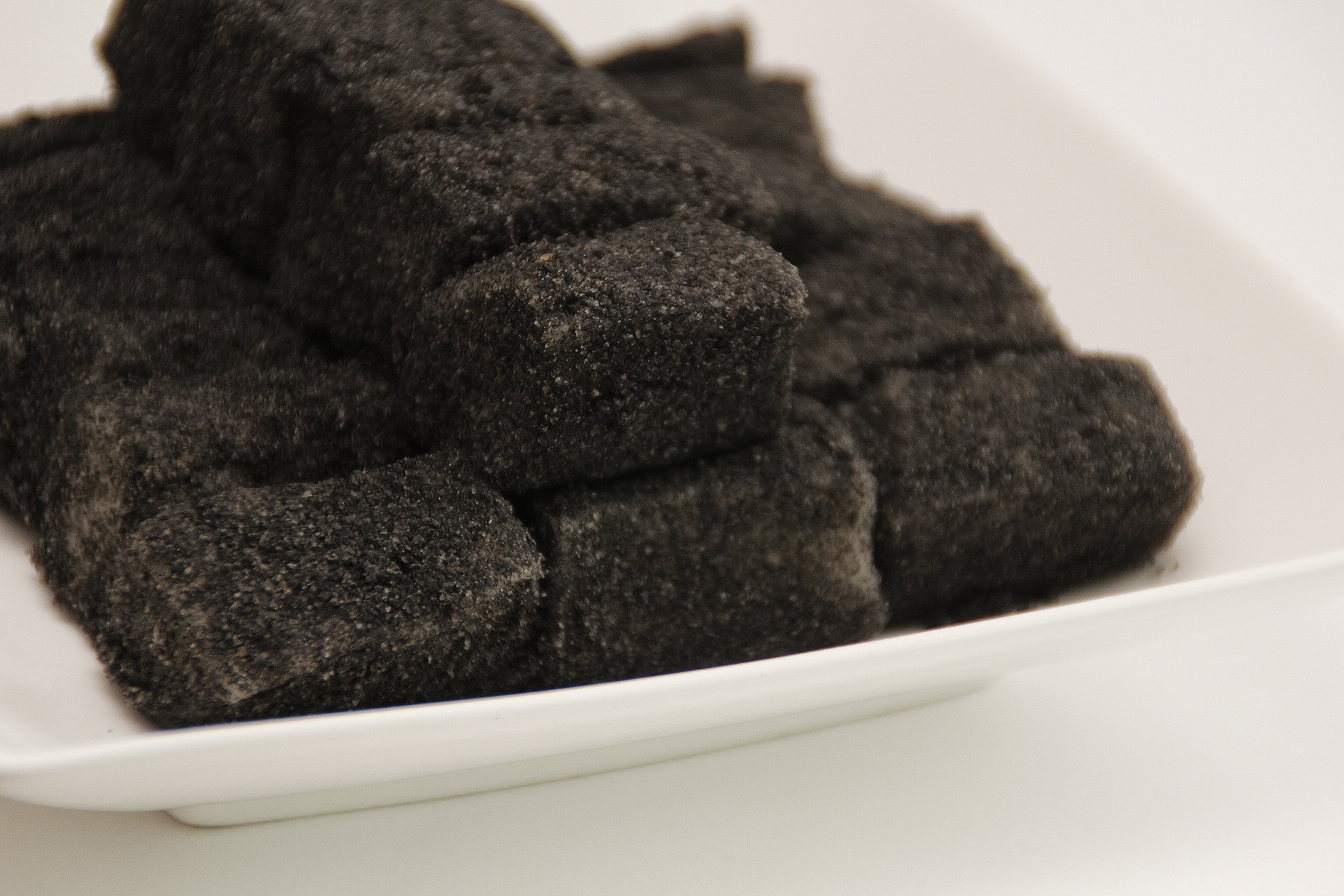
black sesame injeolmi

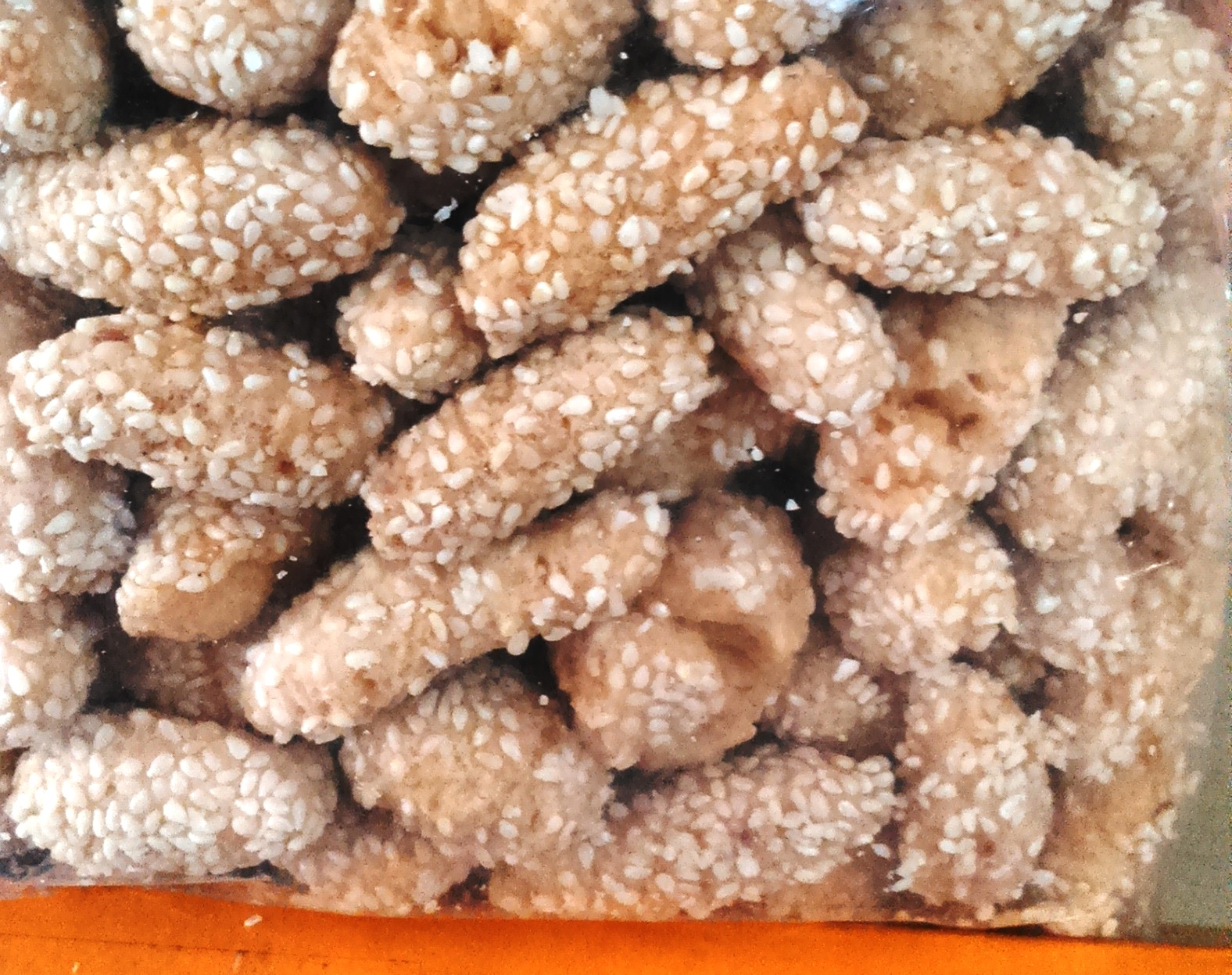
Keciput

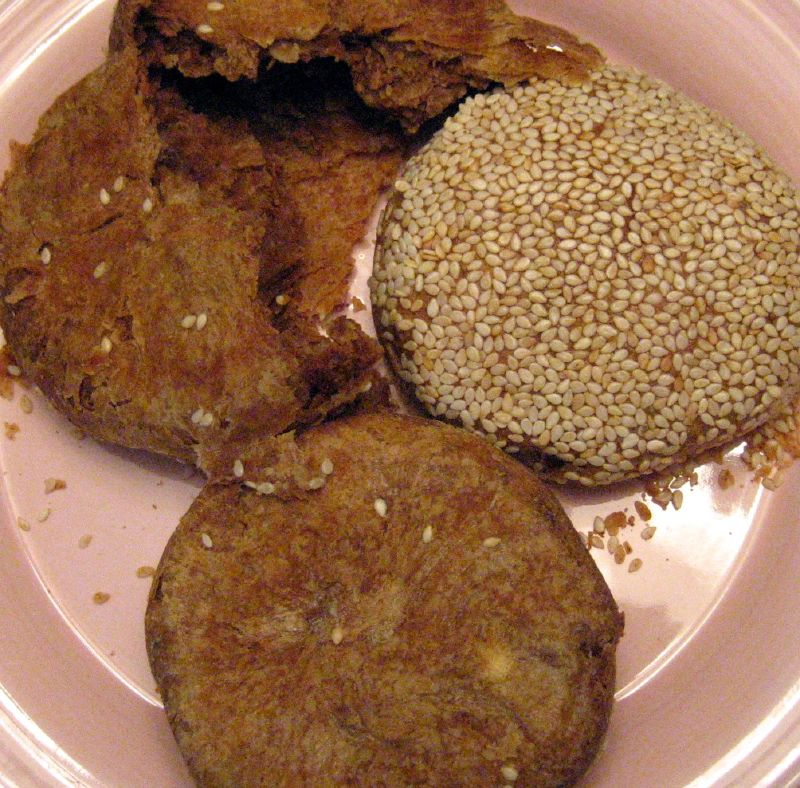
Sesame-seed cakes

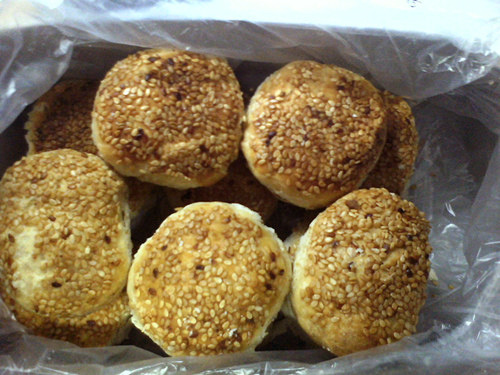
Huangqiao Sesame Cake

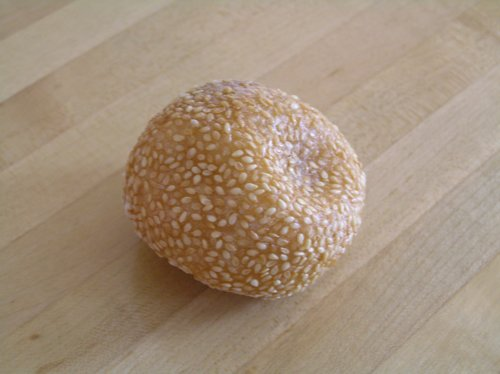
Jian dui

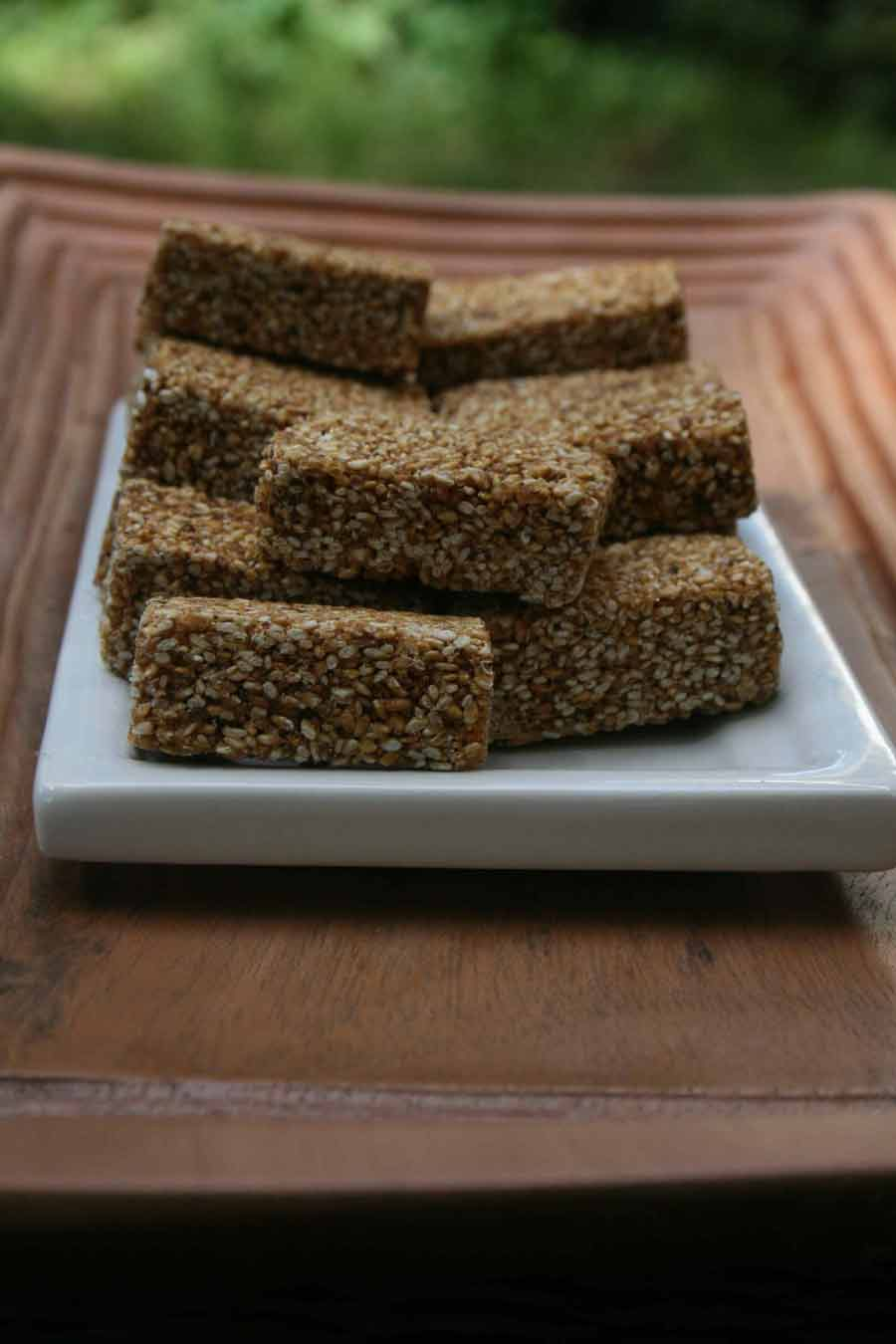
Puerto Rican sesame-seed candy

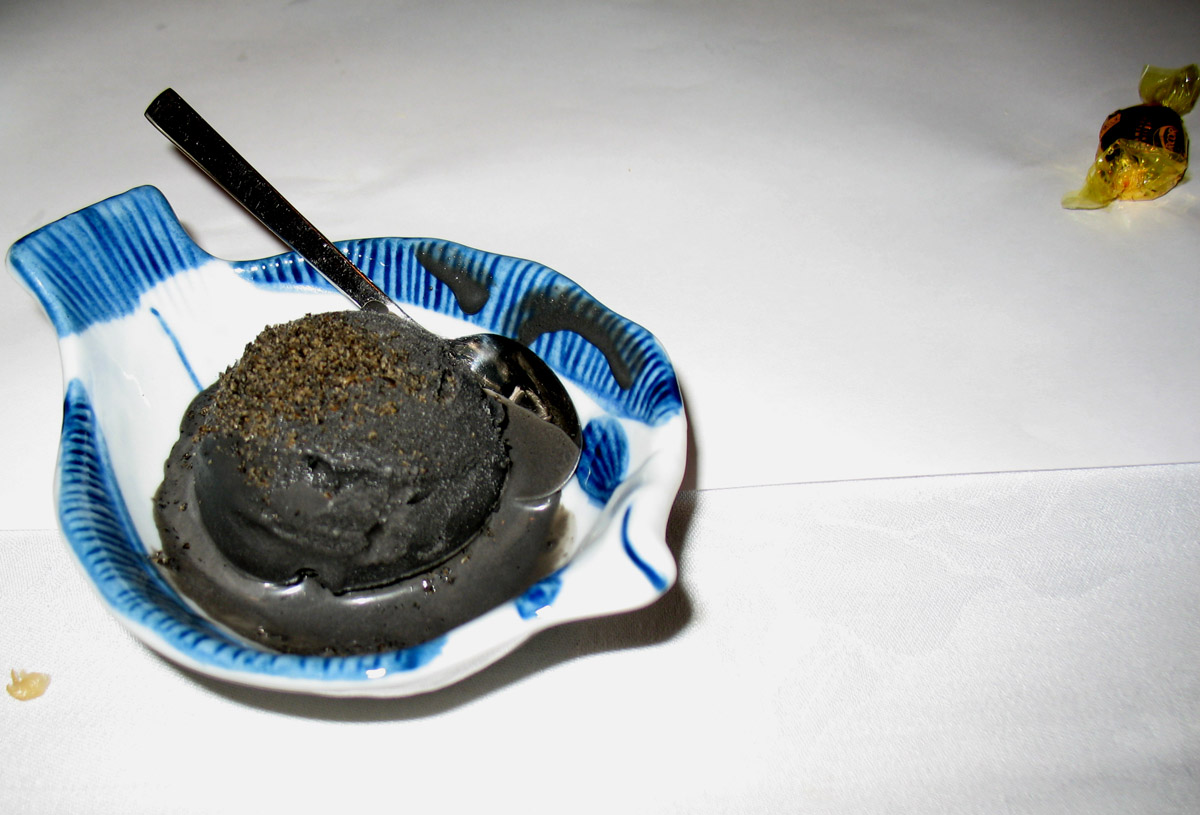
Black sesame ice cream

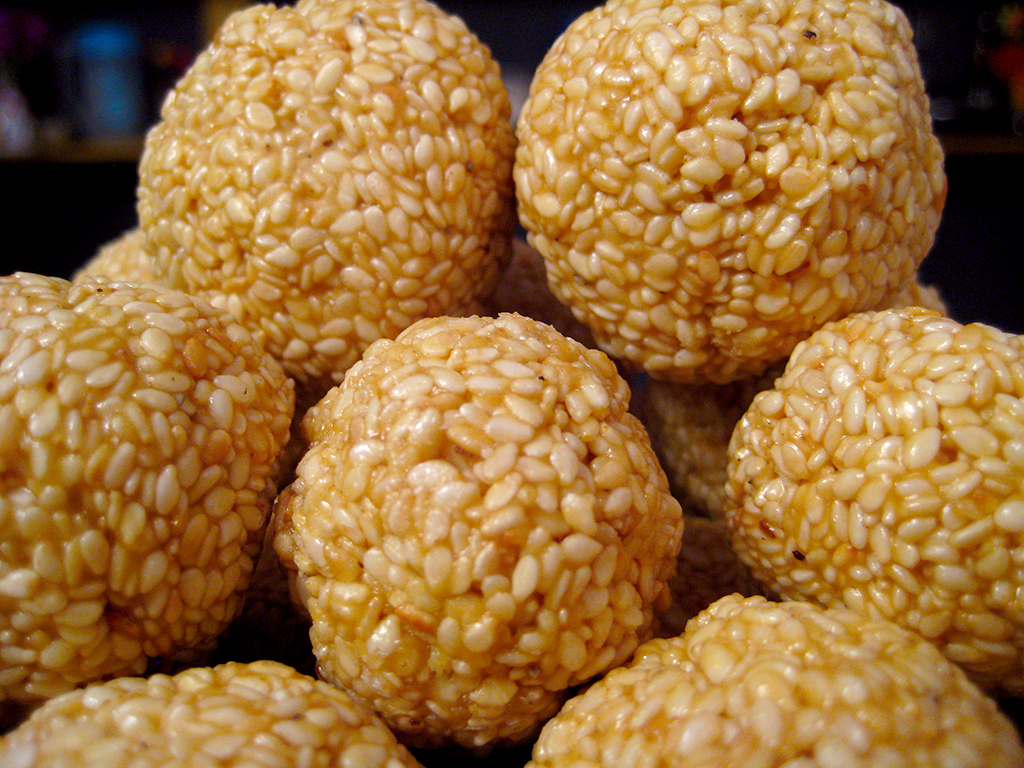
Til ke laddu

== See also ==
- List of edible seeds
- Lists of foods
- List of poppy seed pastries and dishes
- Sesame oil
