= Tilkut =

Sweet originating in India

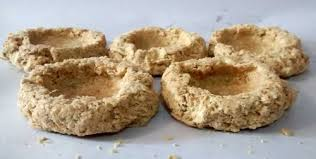
- Alternative names: Tilkatri, palala
- Course: Dessert
- Place of origin: Bhojpur, Magadh
- Region or state: Bihar, Purvanchal and East India
- Created by: Bihar, Purvanchal, Jharkhand
- Main ingredients: Til(sesame seeds), jaggery or sugar
- Variations: Almonds

Tilkut (Bhojpuri/Magahi: 𑂞𑂱𑂪𑂍𑂴𑂗) also known as tilkoot, tilkatri, tilkutam, palala, gajak, tilpatti, is a sweet popular in the Indian states of Bihar, eastern Uttar Pradesh and Jharkhand. It is popular in the Bhojpuri and Magahi regions.

== History ==
Tilkut is especially made and eaten during Sakraat or "Makar sankranti" festival. It is made of pounded 'til' or sesame seeds (Sesamum indicum) and jaggery or sugar. The best tilkut is said to be from Gaya. Reference to this dry sweet is found in the Buddhist literature as palala. It was initially produced in the princely kingdom of Tekari in Ramna, Gaya, and has a 150-year history. The king allegedly cherished tilkut and promoted the craft of creating them.

== Types of Tilkut ==
Normally, three types of tilkuts are available — the refined sugar tilkut is white in colour, the shakkar tilkut is made of unrefined sugar and is light brown in colour and the gur tilkut is made of jaggery and is dark brown in colour. Each of these varieties has its own flavour. The circular shaped savoury is called tilkut and the smaller nut-sized ones are called tillouri.

Winter is the period when sugarcane is harvested. It is also when large quantities of tilkut are made in many towns and even villages. However, as the demand persists throughout the year, smaller quantities are made round the year.

== Regions ==
Tilkut is seasonal dessert used in the Indian States of Bihar, eastern Uttar Pradesh, Jharkhand, West Bengal. During the time of December and January tilkut is sold widely in these regions and it is loved dessert for all ages. it is also related to grah and nakshatra dos. Tilkut is a traditional delicacy mainly prepared during Makar Sankranti, the harvest festival in India. In the Bhojpuri region, it is also prepared during Ganesh Puja, which is celebrated on Magh Chaturthi.

== See also ==
- Bihari cuisine
- Cuisine of Jharkhand
- List of sesame seed dishes
