= Changzhou sesame candy =

Traditional cookie in China

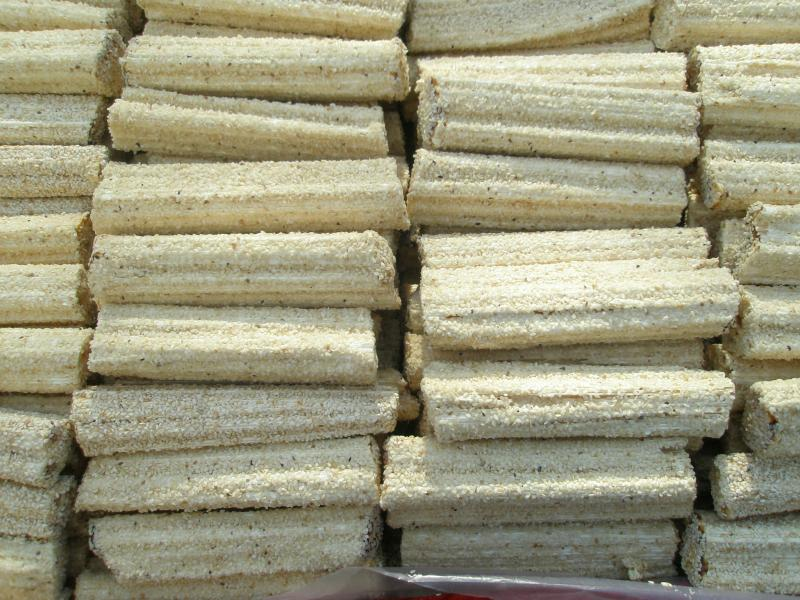
Sesame candy

Changzhou sesame candy is a kind of special traditional cookie which is very popular among people in local places in Changzhou. During the Tang dynasty, Changzhou locals started to produce a kind of sweets shaped like deep-fried sesame seed balls, hence the similar name.

There are two stories relating to how the Changzhou sesame candy earned its popularity. The first states that the emperor didn't have a good appetite and didn't feel like eating anything, since nothing pleased him; however, once he tried some sesame candy from Changzhou, he recovered and declared the sesame candy his favorite food. Another story states that during the Song dynasty the emperor was too afraid of fighting to retaliate when the region was invaded, and thus the nation was on the brink of being entirely destroyed. However, a great number of people made sesame candy to send to the emperor in order to remind him of the importance of the land. This inspired the emperor to fight back at last, and the whole country was saved. Changzhou sesame candy got its name during the Tang dynasty and was usually used for sacrificial rituals.

== See also ==
- List of sesame seed dishes
