= Tilgul =

Indian candy

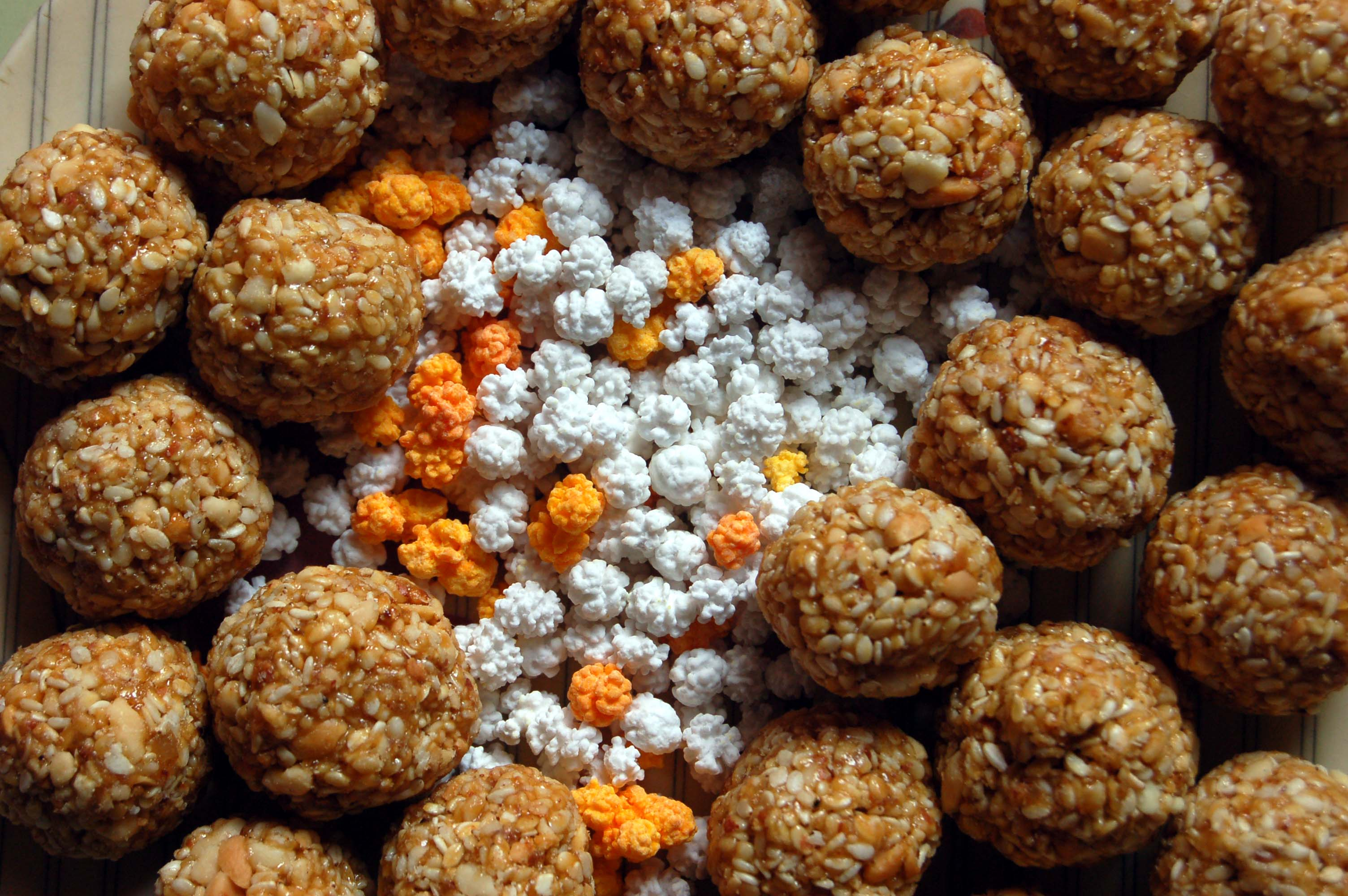
- Course: Dessert
- Place of origin: India
- Region or state: Maharashtra
- Main ingredients: Sesame seeds, jaggery

Tilgul is an Indian jaggery and sesame candy coated with sesame seeds. In the state of Maharashtra, people exchange tilgul on Sankranti, a Hindu festival celebrated on 14 January, which continues for seven days till Rath Saptami.

Sesame and jaggery are both warming foods that can help boost immunity. This candy is thus beneficial for the human body during the winter season. Hence this candy is consumed during winter festivals like Sankranti and Lohri.

The sweet is a mixture of sesame seeds (called "Til" in Marathi) and jaggery (called "Gul" in Marathi), hence the name. On Sankranti eve, families serve their guests Tilgul or Tilgul sweets while saying "Tilgul ghya, goad goad bola" which literally means "Take Tilgul and talk sweetly".

== See also ==
- List of sesame seed dishes
