= Banana roll =

Chinese pastry common in Hong Kong

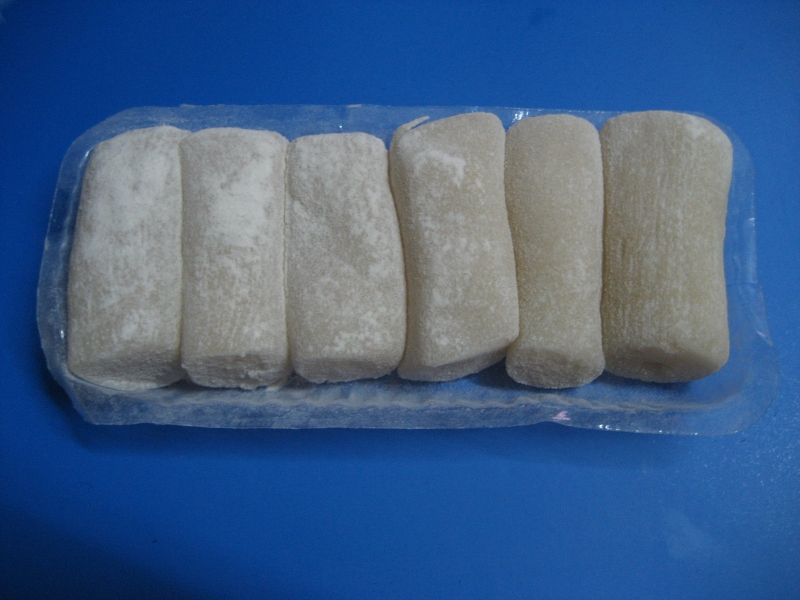
- Type: Pastry
- Place of origin: China
- Region or state: Hong Kong
- Main ingredients: Glutinous rice

Banana roll
- Chinese: 香蕉糕
- Literal meaning: banana cake
Transcriptions
Standard Mandarin
- Hanyu Pinyin: xiang1 jiao1 gao1
Yue: Cantonese
- Jyutping: hoeng1 ziu1 gou1

Alternative Chinese name
- Chinese: 香蕉卷
- Literal meaning: banana roll
Transcriptions
Standard Mandarin
- Hanyu Pinyin: xiang1 jiao1 juan3
Yue: Cantonese
- Jyutping: hoeng1 ziu1 gyun2

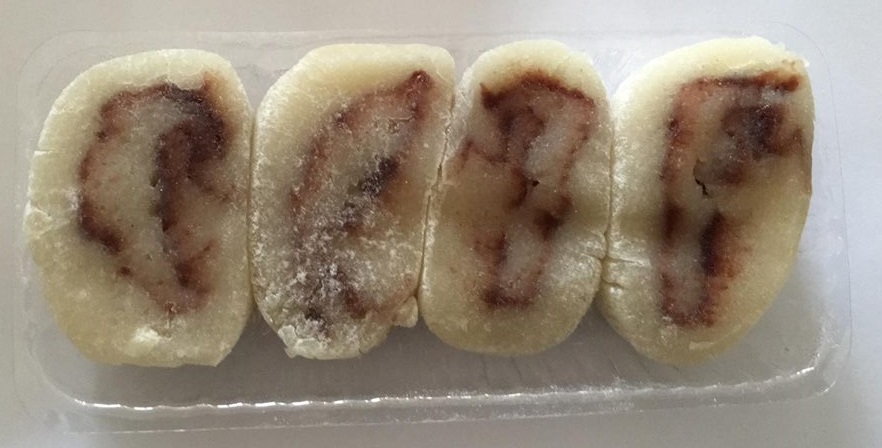
Red bean paste flavored banana cake

Banana roll or banana cake is a common Chinese pastry found in Hong Kong, and may occasionally be found in some overseas Chinatowns. The pastry is soft and made with glutinous rice. Ingredients may vary depending on location. Each roll or cake is a banana oil flavored circular tube or flat object, slightly bigger than an adult sized index finger, thus resembling banana. Sometimes it may have a cinnamon swirl filling. At other times it may have a filling that consists of a very ripe banana diced finely. Occasionally the more traditional red bean paste may be used.

== See also ==
- Black sesame roll
- Swiss roll
- Cinnamon roll
