= Sesame seed cake =

Dessert cake made with sesame seeds

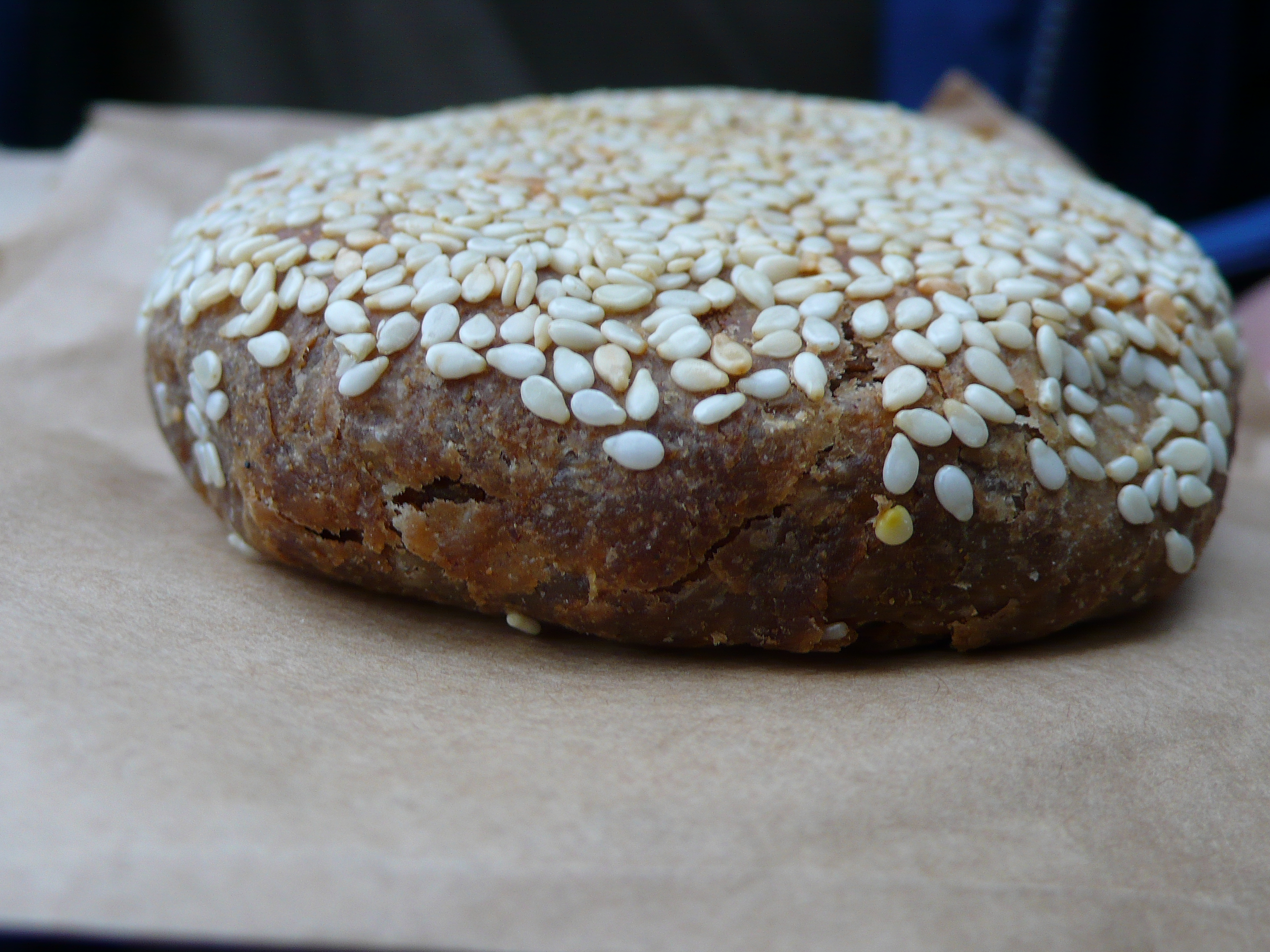
- Type: Cake
- Main ingredients: Sesame seeds, honey

Sesame seed cake (Chinese: 芝麻醬燒餅) is a cake made of sesame seeds, often combined with honey as a sweetener. The cake is round and is brown in color with sesame seeds sprinkled evenly on the surface of the cake. Although there are several variations, it is quite similar to the Huangqiao sesame cake (simplified Chinese: 黄桥烧饼).

== History ==
During the Tang dynasty, Arab traders would travel between China and the West, spreading their Islamic culture including religion and cuisine. Chinese converts thus became known as the Hui people (Huízú), who are associated with this street food for their historical Islamic influences. The earliest record of shao bing was seen in a Chinese historical text, Zīzhì Tōngjiàn (“Comprehensive Mirror to Aid in Government”), a pioneering reference work in Chinese historiography in the form of a chronicle.

== See also ==
- List of sesame seed dishes
