= Black bean =

Black bean commonly refers to:

- Black turtle bean, a variety of common bean (Phaseolus vulgaris) in Latin American cuisine

== Other edible seeds ==
- Black adzuki bean, a variety of adzuki bean in Korean cuisine
- Black gram (Vigna mungo), a variety of gram (lentil) in South Asian cuisine
- Black soybean, in East Asian cuisine
  - Fermented black beans (douchi) used in Chinese cuisine
- Kenyan black bean (Lablab purpureus), used in Kenyan cuisine

== Plants ==
- Castanospermum australe, also known as Moreton Bay Chestnut, a rainforest and ornamental tree named for its large seeds which are poisonous raw, but have been processed into an edible flour by Indigenous Australians
