= Huangqiao sesame cake =

Chinese sesame seed cake

Huangqiao Sesame Cake
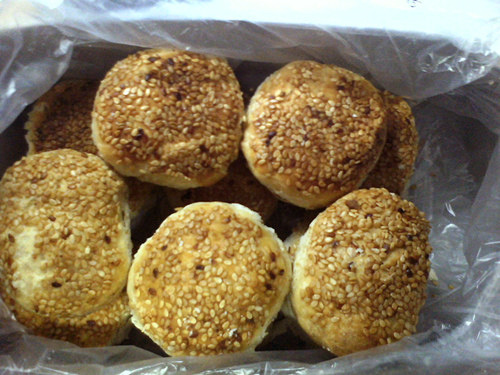
- Type: Bread
- Place of origin: China
- Region or state: Jiangsu
- Main ingredients: Flour, salt, yeast, caramel, pork suet, onion, sesame, alkali, lard

Huangqiao sesame cake (simplified Chinese: 黄桥烧饼; traditional Chinese: 黃橋燒餅; pinyin: Huángqiáo shāobǐng) is a sesame seed cake that originated from Huangqiao town in Taixing, Jiangsu. It has been speculated to be one of the oldest cakes in the Taizhou region of China.

== Description ==
Shapes of the cake include round, elongated, square, oval, bevel-shaped and triangular. In shops, Huangqiao sesame cakes for sale are generally circular and oval, and sweet and salty. Basic ingredients include flour, salt, yeast, caramel, pork suet, onion, sesame, alkali and lard. The liberal use of sesame seeds provides crunchiness and crispness, and gives the cake a golden color. Some cakes include fillings such as leaf lard, sugar, pork flakes, longhidou, sweet osmanthus, crab spawn, jujube paste and shrimp meat, and are considered a premium product.

== History ==
Sesame cakes have a long history. The earliest record of this kind of sesame cakes is from a book of the Northern Wei dynasty, known as Qi Min Yao Shu, the first book on agriculture in Chinese history, written by the early agronomist Jia Sixie (贾思勰). The book has a chapter specifically on "cake method". Also, Travels of Lao Can (Chinese: 老残游记; pinyin: Lǎo Cán Yóujì), written by Liu E of the Qing dynasty also has a description of it.

The origin of the Huangqiao sesame cake is unknown, but there are some stories popular in folklore. It is said that, in the Qing dynasty, a county magistrate of Rugao County passed by the county of Huangqiao and chanced upon its sesame cakes. After returning home, he could never forget the taste of it and had a strong desire for a second taste. However, these two counties were 30 kilometres (19 mi) apart, and it was impractical to go to Huangqiao especially for the cakes there. He decided to send his corvee regularly to purchase a large quantity of these cakes.

In addition, many personages from the vicinity of Huangqiao had written in praise for the snack. Zhang Lihui (章力挥), the main writer of the revolutionary opera Taking Tiger Mountain by Strategy, was so taken with Huangqiao sesame cakes since childhood that he ate it in the morning, at noon, and at night. He said that it is far tastier than fish soup and any other food he had eaten.

The Huangqiao sesame cake got its major claim to fame from the Battle of Rugao–Huangqiao of 1946, from the Chinese Civil War. It was said that the communists owed its victory in that battle to the locals who provided the sesame cakes to the soldiers. This episode has been written into song as the "Ode to Huangqiao Sesame Cake" (黄桥烧饼歌) which was sung throughout the country.

While initially a simple snack meant for rations, great changes had taken place to it in sixty years so that it is now considered a national snack. Originally it was made of nothing but flour with little oil and sesame that people could not enjoy except special days. In contrast, nowadays Huangqiao sesame cakes take form in new shapes like rectangles and ovals, while the fillings have been enhanced with floss, ham, shrimp, shallot, diced chicken, sausage, etc. The cakes are also smaller, reflecting its transformation from a soldier's ration to the bite-sized snack today.

== See also ==
- List of sesame seed dishes
