= List of porridges =

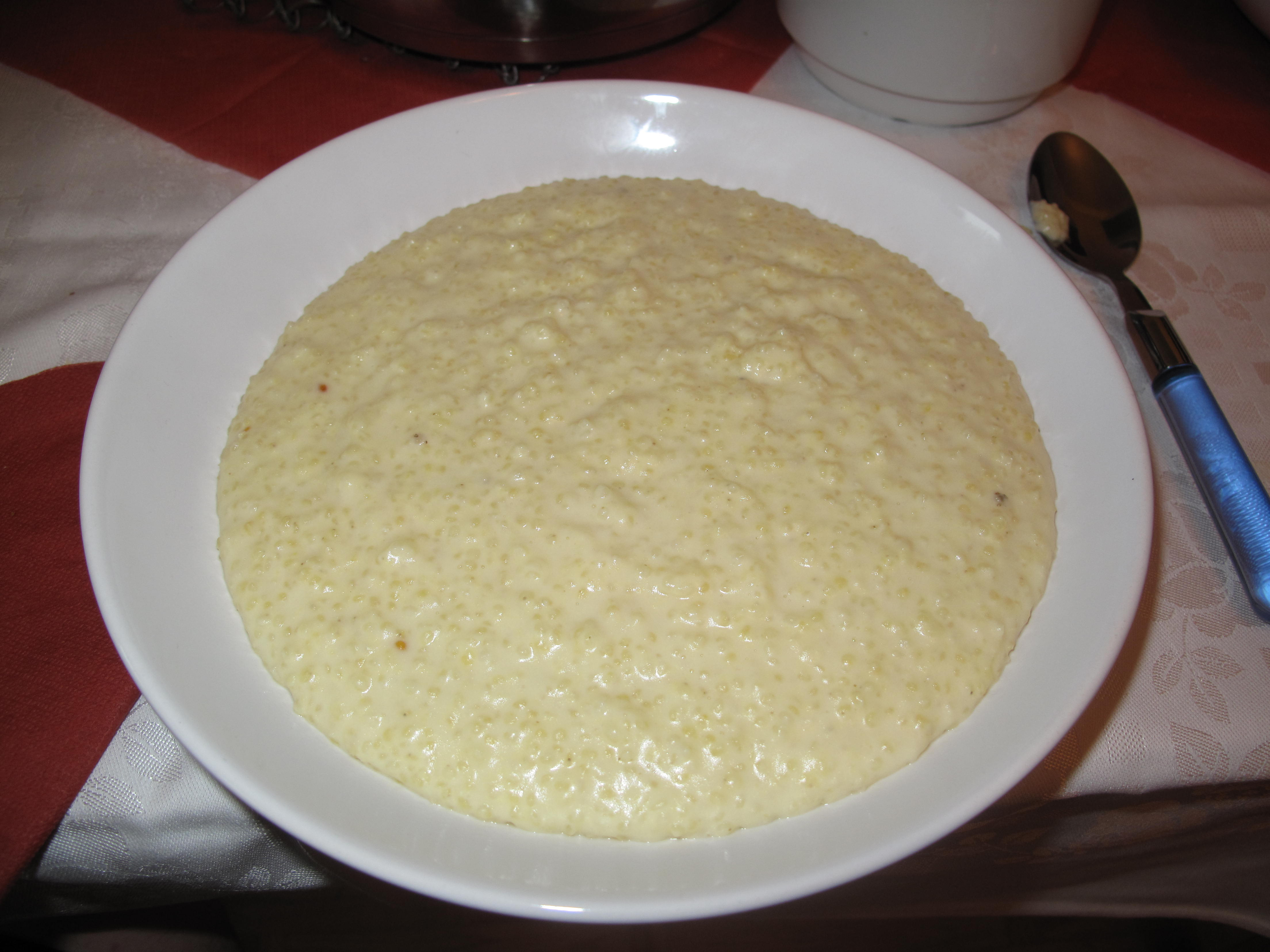
A porridge made with millet

Porridge is a dish made by boiling ground, crushed, or chopped starchy plants (typically grains) in water, milk, or both, with optional flavorings, and is usually served hot in a bowl or dish. It may be served as a sweet or savory dish, depending on the flavourings.

== Porridges ==
=== A ===
- Atole – traditional masa-based hot maize-based beverage of Mexican and Central American origin. It includes masa (corn hominy flour), water, piloncillo (unrefined cane sugar), cinnamon, vanilla and optional chocolate or fruit. The mixture is blended and heated before serving.
- Avena – prepared with stewed oatmeal, milk, water, cinnamon, clove and sugar
- Arroz caldo or aroskaldo – a variant of congee in Philippine cuisine

=== B ===
- Barley gruel – type of porridge found in Danyang, Jiangsu. It is made from barley, rice and alkali.
- Belila is an Egyptian porridge made from pearl wheat, cooked in a light syrup with anise seed and golden raisins, served with chopped toasted nuts and a splash of milk.
- Bogobe jwa logala – sorghum porridge cooked in boiling milk, with or without sugar.
- Boota copassa – a Chickasaw phrase meaning 'cold flour'. It consists of parched and pounded zea (maize) before it reaches maturity. A small quantity of meal is thrown into cold water, where it boils and swells as much as common meal boiled over fire.
- Brenntar – Made of specially roasted flour (Musmehl). Particularly prominent in the Swabian Jura and in the Allgäu.
- Bubur ayam – Malaysian and Indonesian chicken congee. It is rice congee with shredded chicken meat served with condiments such as chopped scallion, crispy fried shallot, celery, tongcay (preserved salted vegetables) and fried soybeans.
- Bubur kacang hijau – Malaysian and Indonesian mung bean congee, in which the beans are boiled in coconut milk with palm sugar.
- Bubur ketan hitam or bubur pulut hitam – an Indonesian and Malaysian sweet dessert made from black glutinous rice porridge with coconut milk and palm sugar. It is often described as "black rice pudding".
- Byggrøt / -graut – type of porridge traditional in Norway. It is made from barley, milk or water, salt and butter. The ingredients are boiled together for a few minutes; the grits are then poured onto a plate, where sugar and cinnamon are sprinkled on top, and a piece of butter is added in the center. This dish was a staple part of the Norwegian diet during pre-industrial times, sugar and cinnamon being the modern changes to the dish.
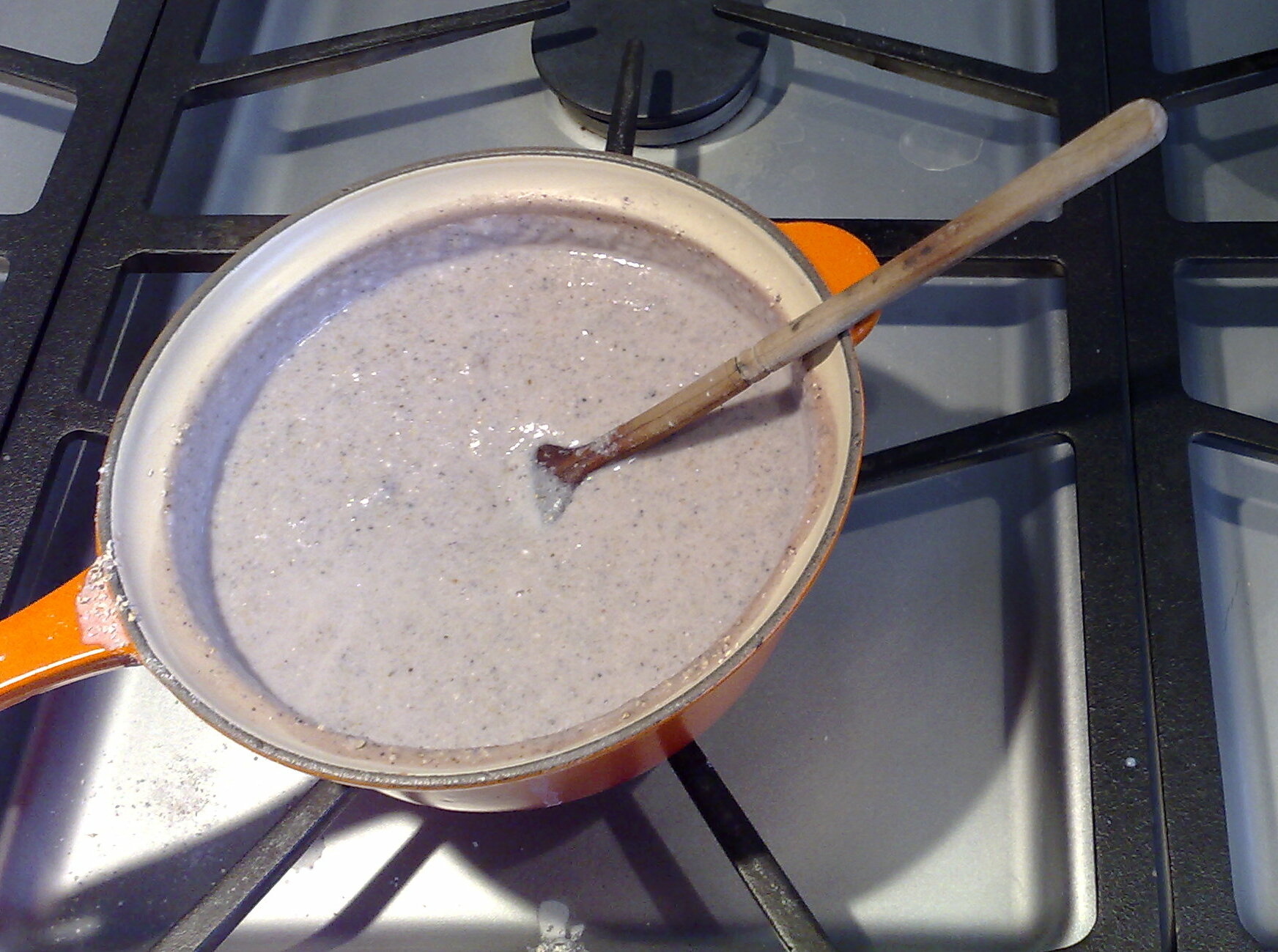
Atole

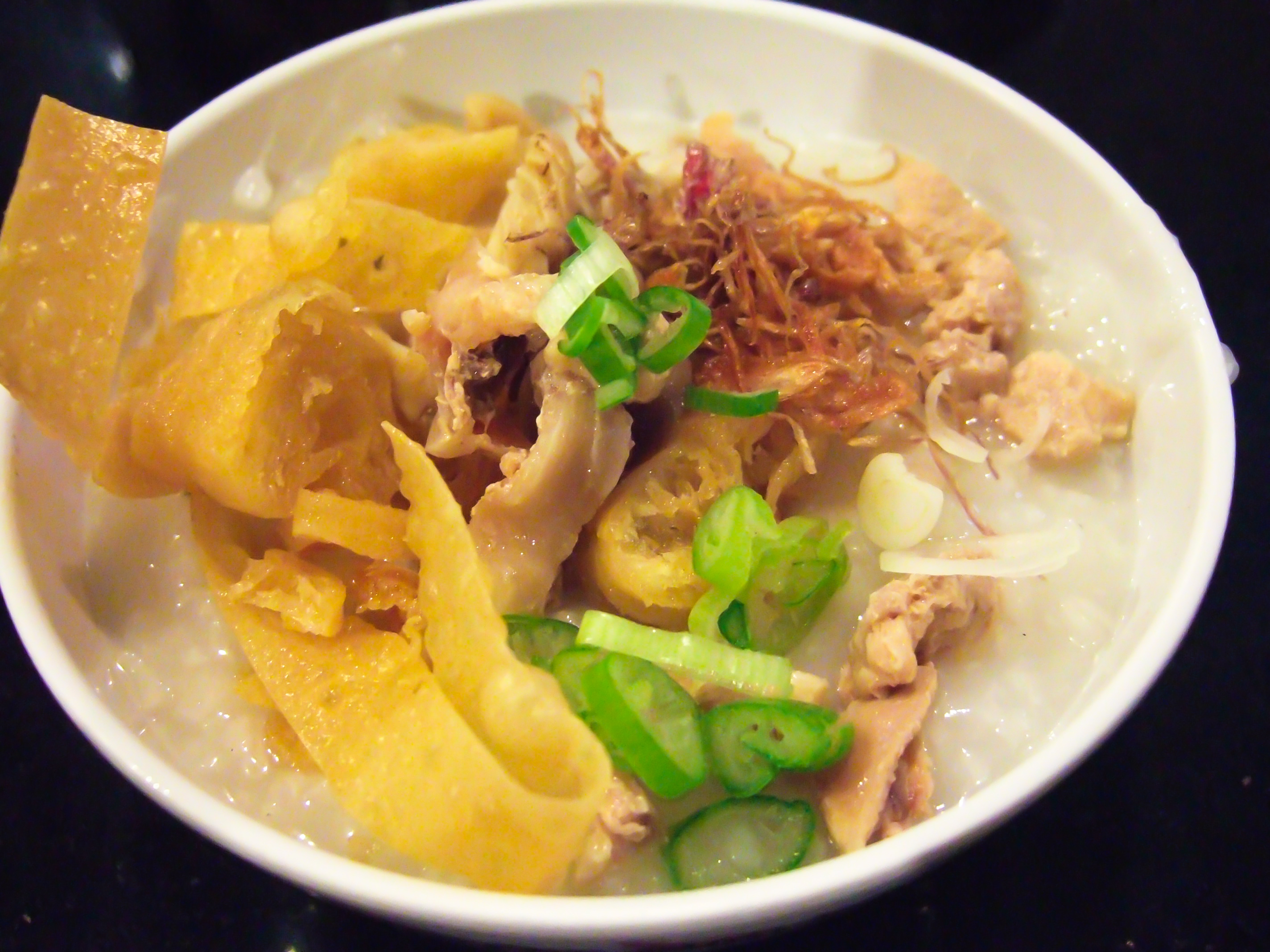
Bubur ayam, with additional toppings

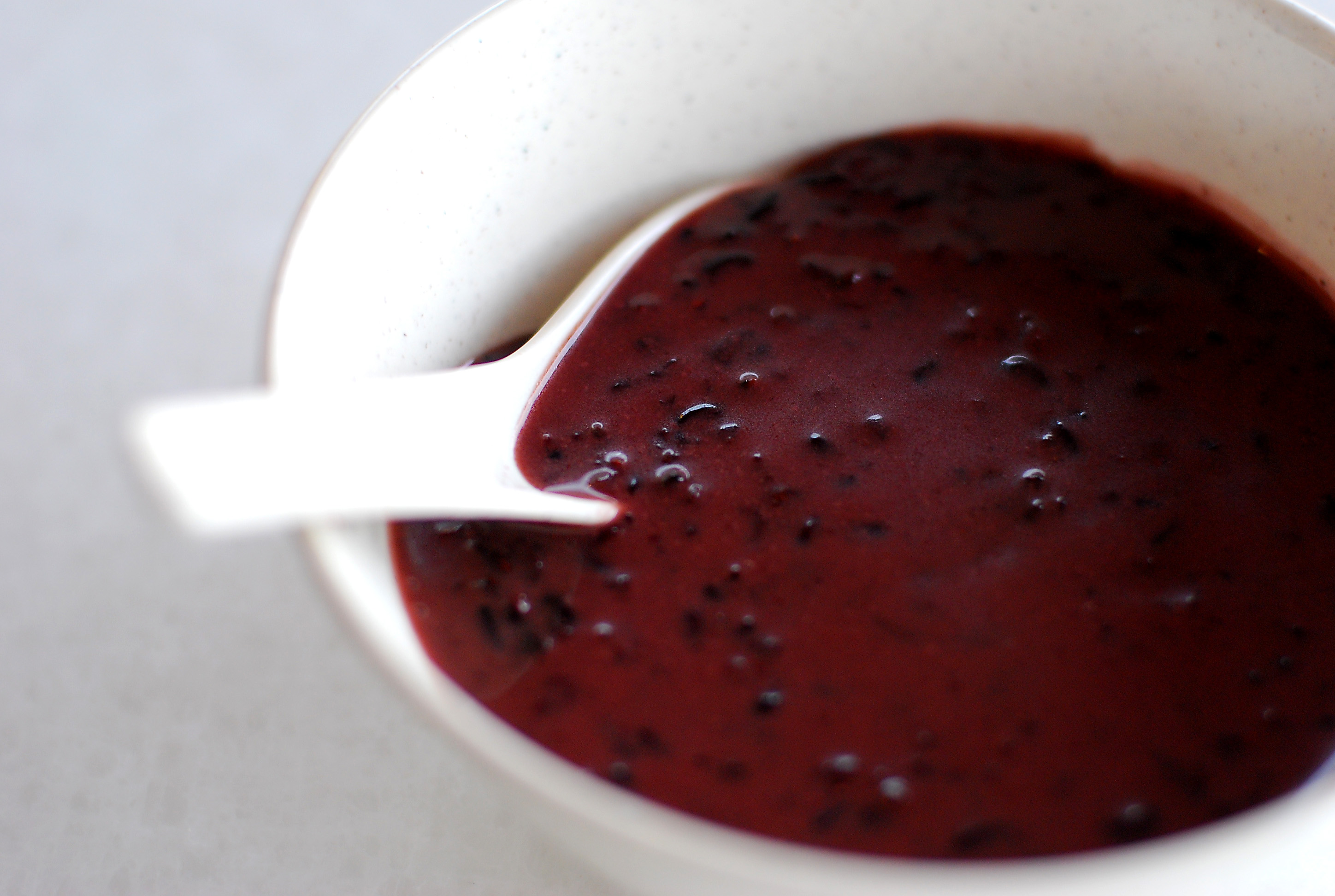
Bubur ketan (pulut) hitam

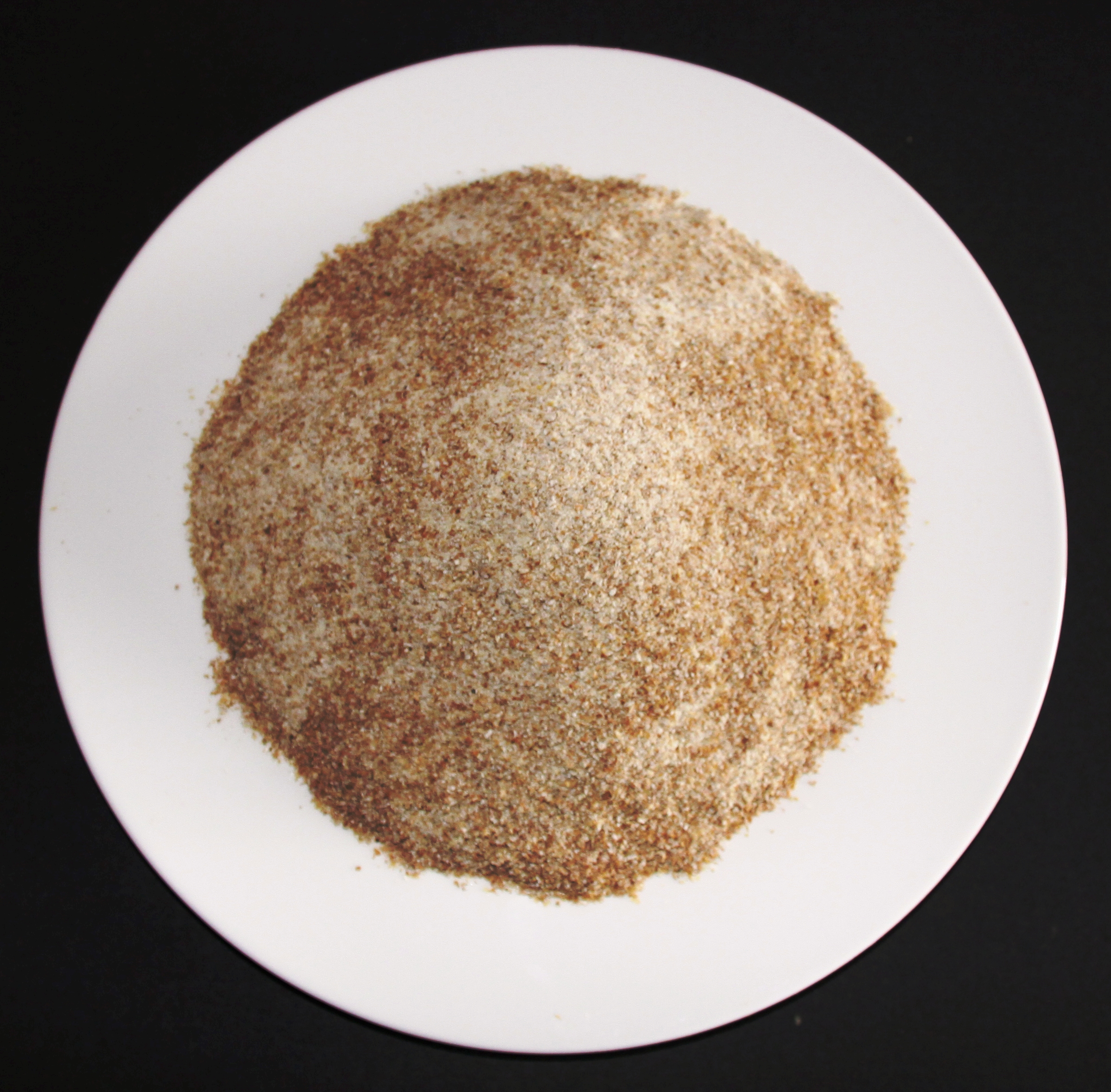
Musmehl, main ingredient of Brenntar

=== C ===
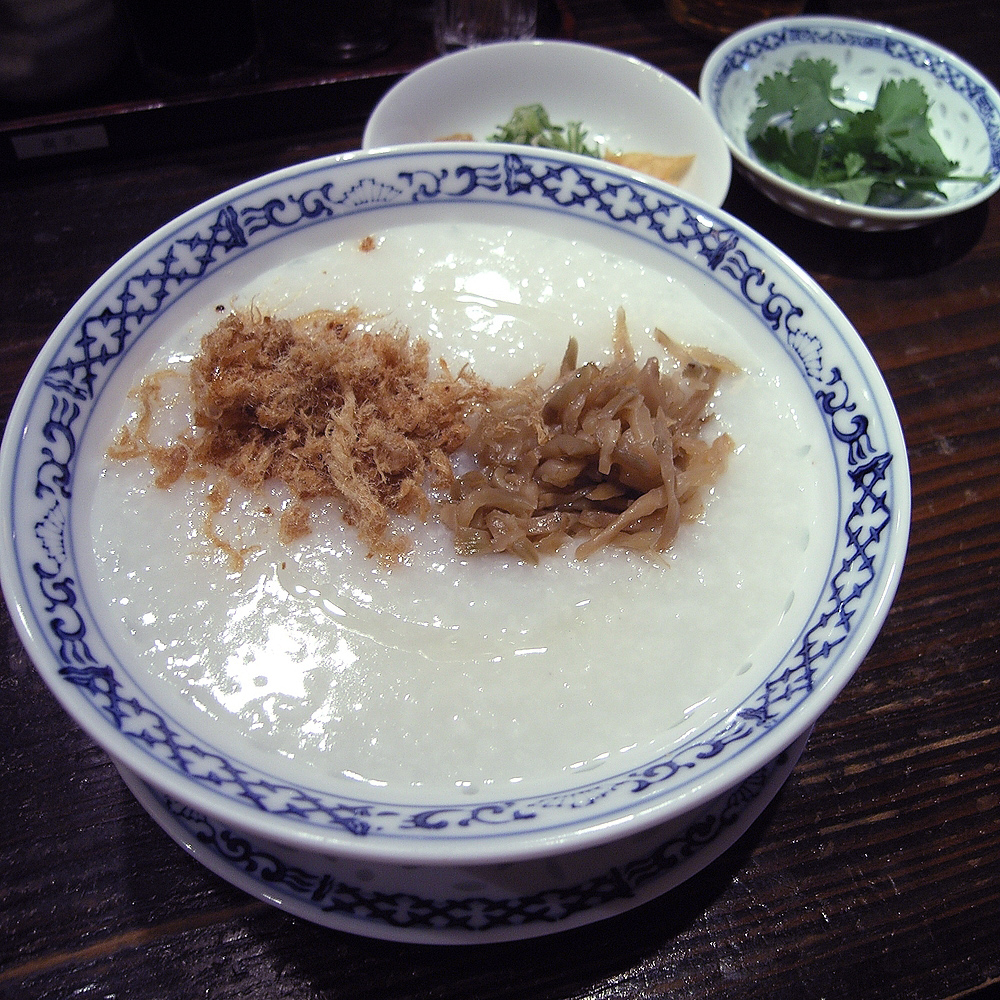
Chinese rice congee

- Candil – Indonesian sweet glutinous rice ball porridge, made from sticky rice flour, brown sugar and coconut milk.
- Cháo bầu – Vietnamese rice congee containing pig kidney
- Chatang – traditional gruel common to both Beijing cuisine and Tianjin cuisine, and often sold as a snack on the street. It can be made from combinations of sorghum flour, broomcorn millet or proso millet flour and glutinous millet flour.
- Champorado or tsampurado – a sweet chocolate rice porridge in Philippine cuisine.
- Congee – type of rice porridge or gruel popular in many Asian countries. Names for congee are as varied as the style of its preparation.
- Cornmeal porridge – type of hot sweet breakfast cereal made from finely ground cornmeal popular in Jamaica. Milk or coconut milk, vanilla, cinnamon and nutmeg are usually added for flavor. Bob Marley sang of sharing cornmeal porridge in his song "No Woman, No Cry."
- Cream of Wheat – an American brand of farina: a porridge-type breakfast food made from wheat semolina.
- Cuccìa – traditional, primarily Sicilian dish containing boiled wheatberries and sugar, eaten on December 13, the feast day of Saint Lucy, the patron saint of Siracusa (Syracuse).

=== D ===
- Dakjuk – type of juk (Korean porridge) made with chicken.
- Dalia – type of Indian porridge made with Indian grains such as wheat or barley, and served with nuts and dried fruit.

=== E ===
- Eghajira – a sweet, thick drink, normally drunk by the Tuaregs on special occasions.

=== F ===
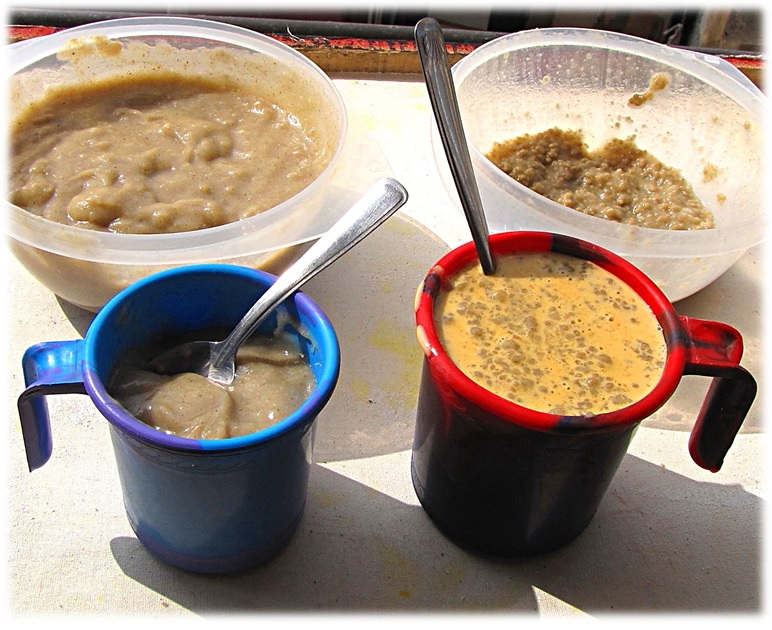
Millet flour porridges: rouy (smooth infant porridge) versus fondé (rolled pellets and milk). Senegal.

- Farex brand name instant baby cereal food served warm or cold as a first food for infants. Produced by the Glaxo company in Australia and New Zealand since the 1930s.
- Farina – cereal food, frequently described as mild-tasting, usually served warm, made from cereal grains (usually semolina).
- Frumenty is a dish popular in Western European medieval cuisine. It was made primarily from boiled, cracked wheat – hence its name, which derives from the Latin word frumentum, "grain".
- Fondé – a boiled porridge made with rolled millet flour pellets (araw/arraw) served stirred with condensed milk, sugar, a little butter if available. For older children and adults. Senegal.
- Fungi (pronounced FOONgee) a boiled porridge made from cornmeal, served sweet or (more often) savory. A standard component of the native 'Fish and Fungi' dish native to the U.S. and British Virgin Islands.

=== G ===
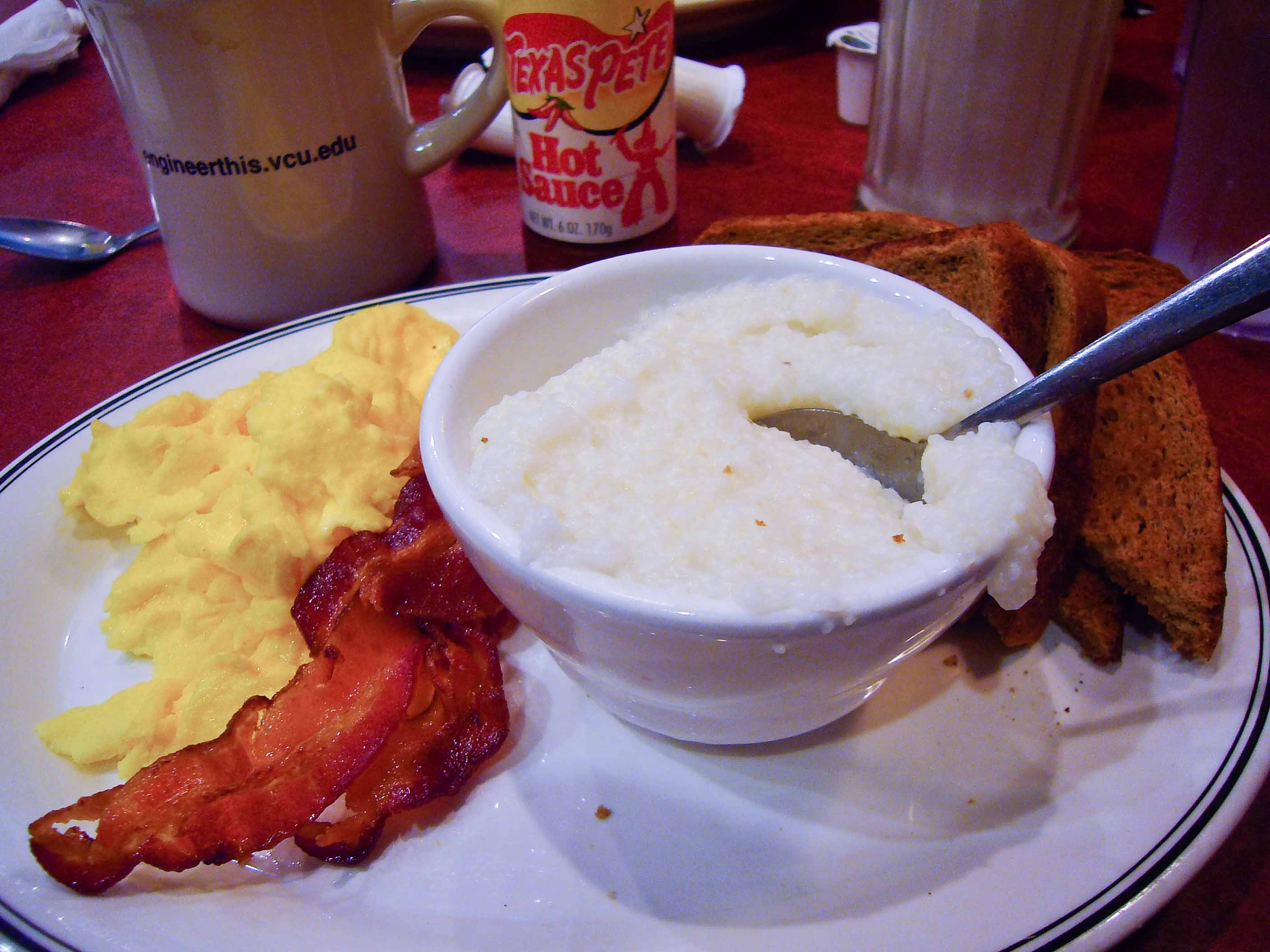
Prepared grits (in bowl)

- Ga'at – a stiff porridge eaten in Eritrea and Ethiopia, often prepared with barley flour.
- Gachas – an ancestral basic dish from central and southern Spain. Its main ingredients are flour, water, olive oil, garlic and salt.
- Garbuzova kasha – a traditional Ukrainian dish from pumpkin, used for dinner or dessert.
- Gofio escaldado or escaldón – a kind of thick porridge of the Canary Islands made by mixing gofio with the stock from a stew or soup, which is then served alongside the same.
- Gofio con leche – similar to the above, but prepared with hot milk (and sometimes cinnamon) and consumed at breakfast.
- Gomme (food) – a traditional Norwegian dish used for dinner or dessert; one variety is a white, porridge-like variant made of milk and oat grains or rice.
- Grit (grain) – (going back to Old English grytt or grytta or gryttes) is an almost extinct word for bran, chaff, mill-dust also for oats that have been husked but not ground, or that have been only coarsely ground—coarse oatmeal.
- Grits – ground-maize food of Native American origin, common in the Southern United States and mainly eaten at breakfast. Modern grits are commonly made of alkali-treated hominy.
- Groat (grain) – the hulled kernels of various cereal grains such as oat, wheat, and rye. Groats are whole grains that include the cereal germ and fiber-rich bran portion of the grain as well as the endosperm (which is the usual product of milling).
- Gruel – very thin porridge, often drunk.
- Gungude – also known as congatay or plantain porridge; a Caribbean porridge made from sun-dried plantains or green bananas. It is often fed to infants.
- Guriev porridge – a Russian porridge dish prepared from semolina and milk with the addition of nuts (hazelnut, walnuts, almonds), kaimak (creamy foams) and dried fruits.
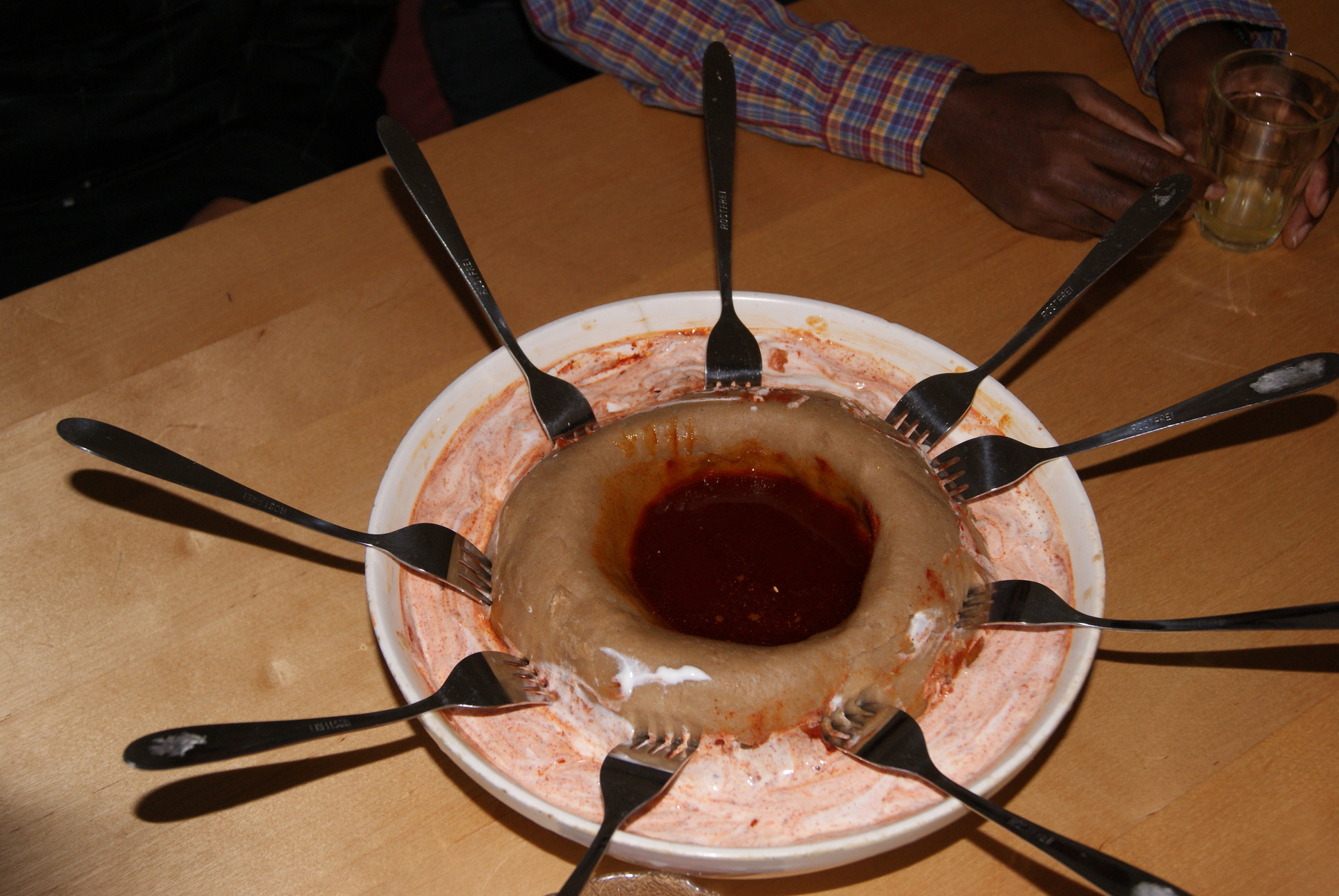
Ga'at

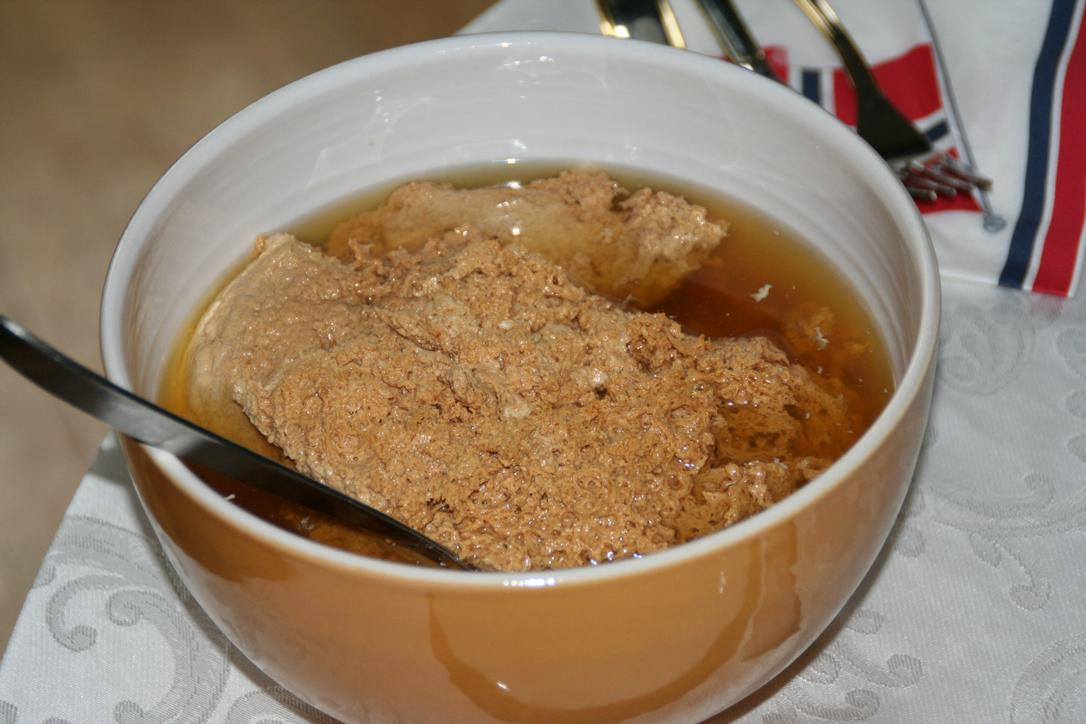
Gomme

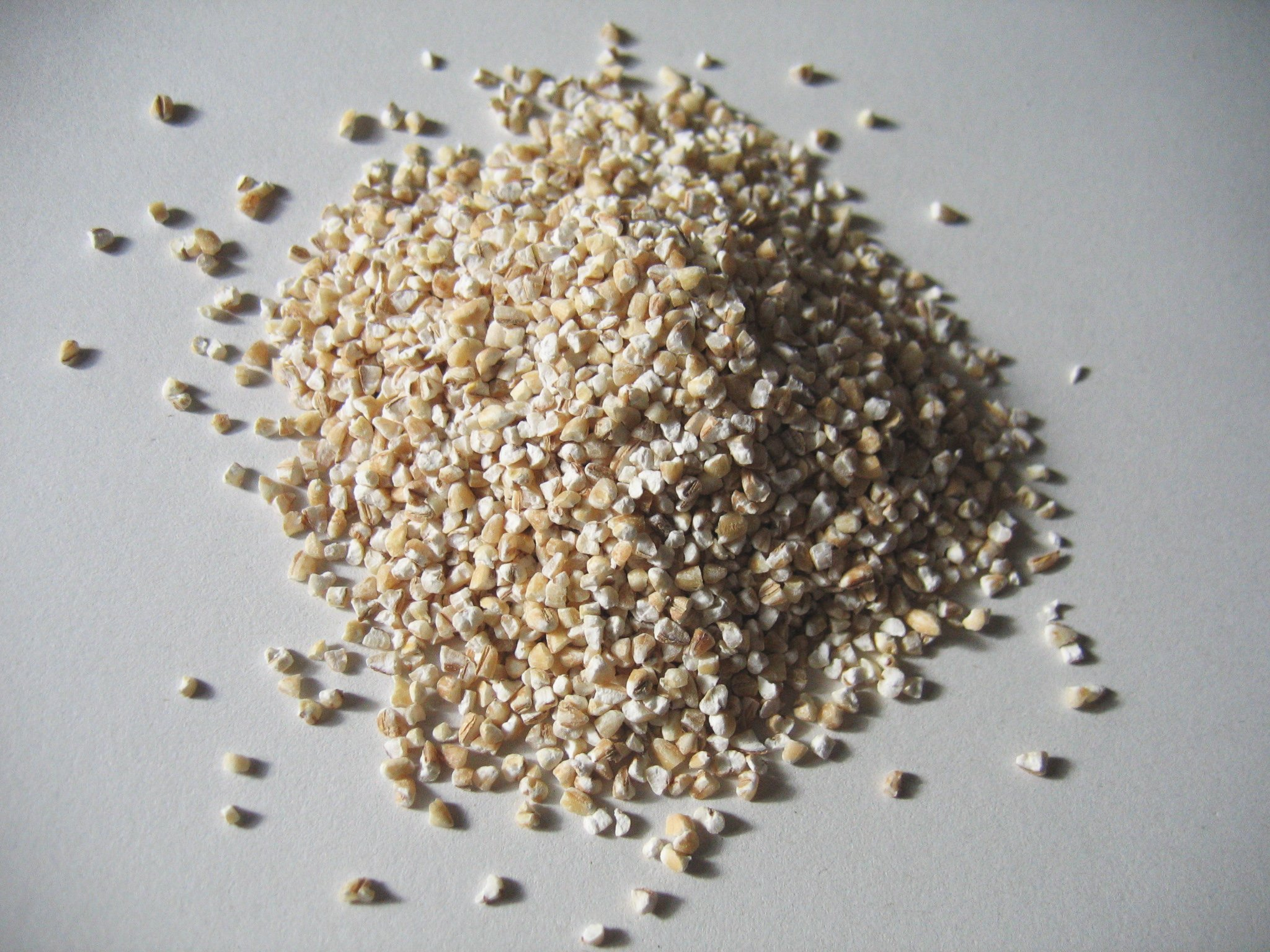
Groats are often soaked before cooking to soften them, and are used in soups and porridges.

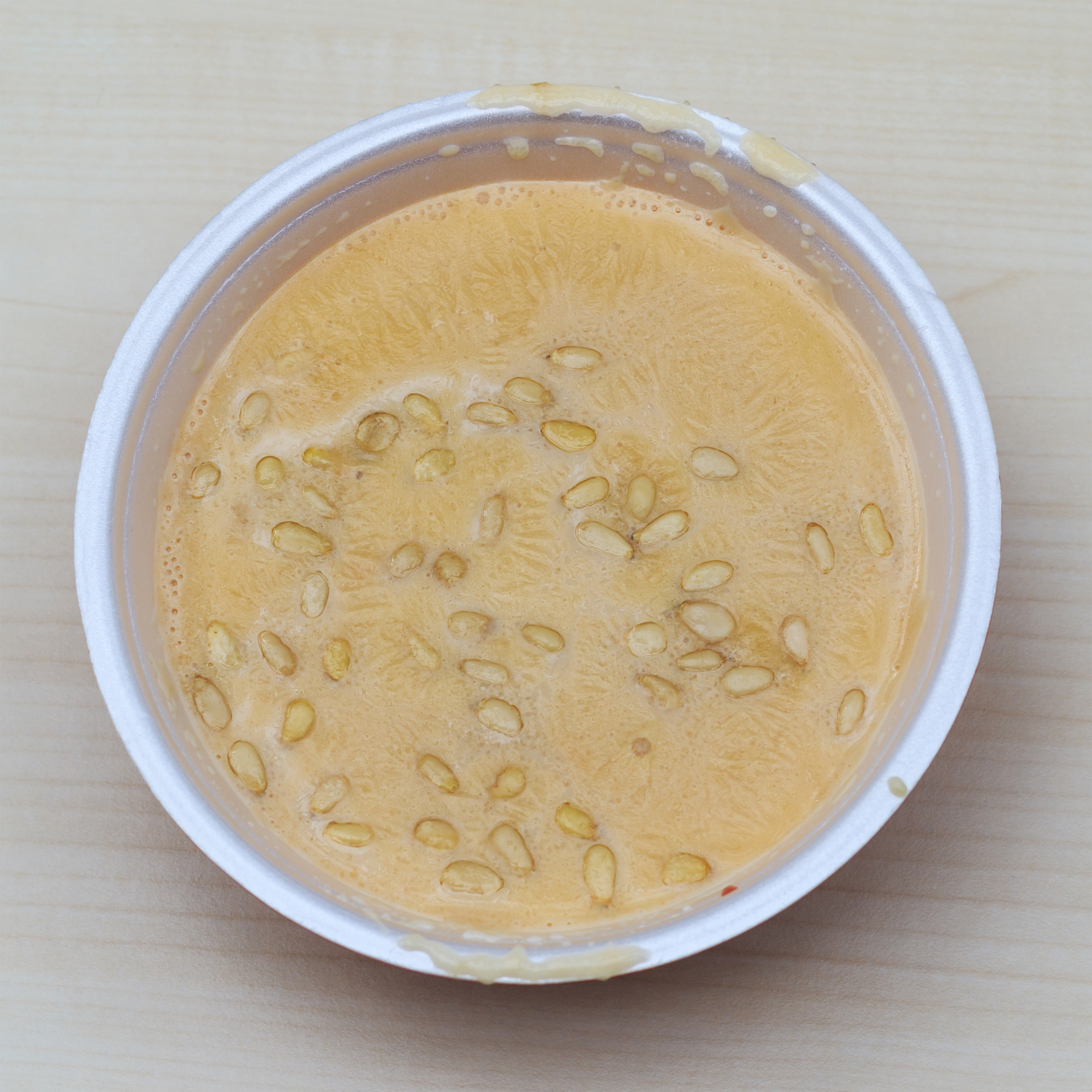
Guriev porridge

=== H ===
- Hapanvelli – a traditional Southeastern Finnish dish that resembles pea soup but has a more sour flavor.
- Harees – a Middle Eastern dish of boiled, cracked, or coarsely-ground wheat and meat or chicken. Its consistency varies between a porridge and a dumpling.
- Hasty pudding – a pudding or porridge of grains cooked in milk or water. In the United States, it invariably refers to a version made of ground maize. Hasty pudding is notably mentioned in a verse of the early American song Yankee Doodle.
- Helmipuuro – traditional in Finland and in Russia, this porridge is made from monodisperse grains of potato starch that are swelled in boiling milk into translucent "pearls" of about 5 mm in diameter, thus the name helmipuuro ("pearl porridge").
- Hobakjuk – a variety of juk, or Korean porridge, made with steamed pumpkin or squash and glutinous rice flour or rice soaked in water.
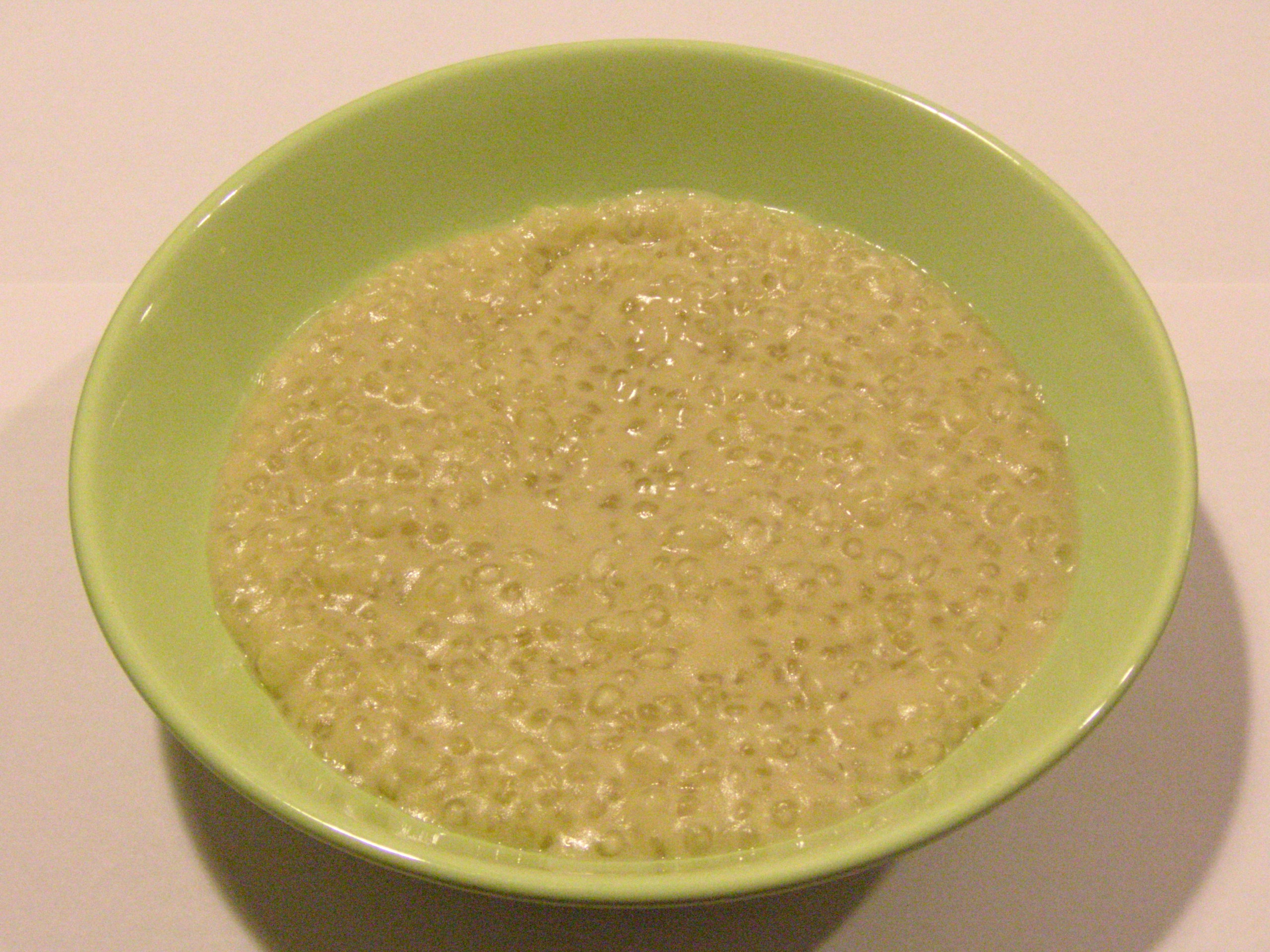
Helmipuuro

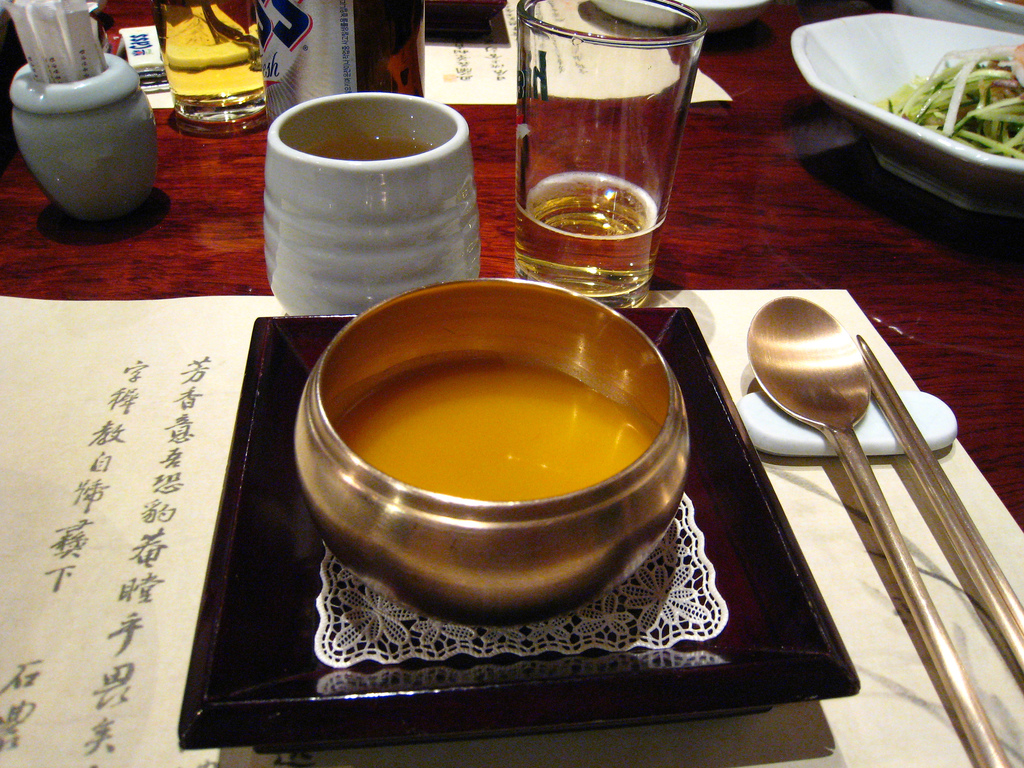
Hobakjuk served in a bangjja bowl

=== J ===
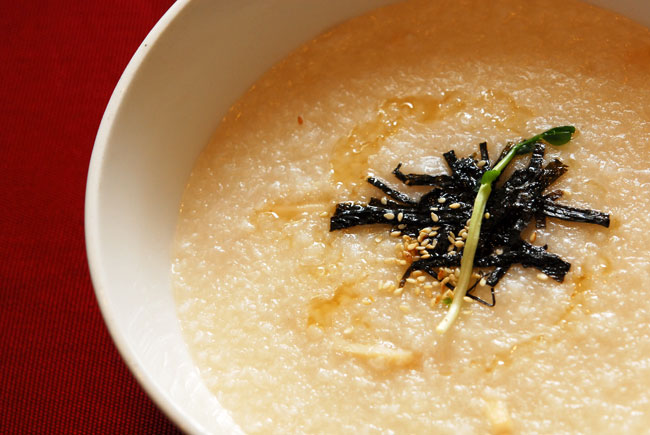
Jeonbokjuk

- Janggukjuk – a variety of juk, or Korean porridge, made with pounded non-glutinous rice (as opposed to glutinous rice), beef and brown oak mushrooms.
- Jatjuk – a variety of juk made by boiling finely ground pine nuts and rice flour or soaked rice. Janggukjuk is seasoned with soy sauce, and it literally means soy sauce porridge.
- Jeonbokjuk – juk made with abalone and white rice
- Juk (food) – a Korean porridge category that include congee varieties made of rice and other grains such as beans, sesame, and azuki beans. It is similar to congee varieties in other Eastern Asian countries under different names. Juk is often eaten warm in Korea, especially as a morning meal, but is now eaten at any time of the day.

=== K ===
- Kānga pirau – a fermented corn porridge dish that is made and consumed by the Māori of New Zealand
- Kasha – a buckwheat cereal eaten in Central and Eastern Europe (especially Russia) and the United States. It is a common filling for a knish. This English-language usage probably originated with Jewish immigrants, as did the form קאַשי "kashi" (technically plural, literally translated as "porridges").
- Khichdi – a preparation made in South and Southeast Asia from cooking lentils and rice together. It can be prepared to a pilaf-like consistency, or as more of a porridge or soup. It is a comfort food, can be served to babies, and it is often served to the ill.
- Koozh – the Tamil name for a porridge made from millet. It is commonly sold by street vendors in the state of Tamil Nadu in India.
- Krentjebrij – a Groningen/north Drenthe traditional soup or porridge-like dessert with juice of berries that is eaten either warm or cold.
- Kutia – a sweet grain pudding, traditionally served in Russia, Ukraine, Belarus and some parts of Poland. Kutia is often the first dish in the traditional twelve-dish Christmas Eve supper (also known as Svyatah Vecherya / Sviata Vecheria / Sviatyi Vechir : Holy Evening).
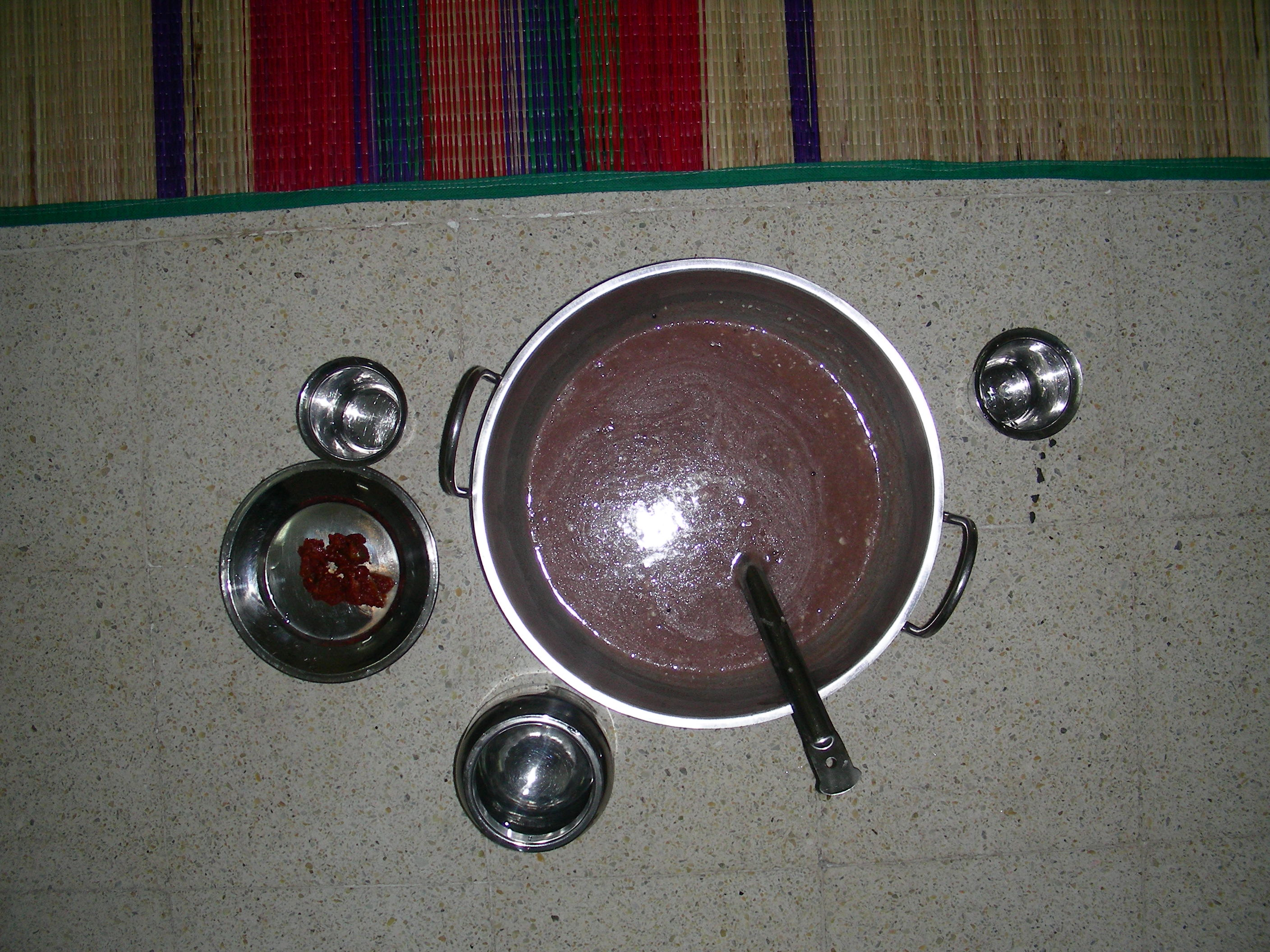
Koozh

=== L ===
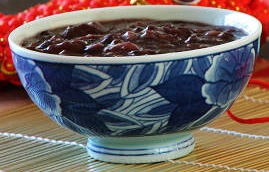
Laba congee with nuts and dried fruits

- Laba congee – a ceremonial congee dish eaten on the eighth day of the twelfth month in the Chinese calendar. The earliest form of this dish was cooked with red beans, it has since developed into many different kinds.
- Lakh – a very popular boiled porridge made with rolled millet flour pellets (araw/arraw) typically topped at serving with sweetened fermented milk. Usually served in a communal bowl or platter. West Africa, Senegal. (Lakh and araw are from the Wolof, names vary between languages and countries)
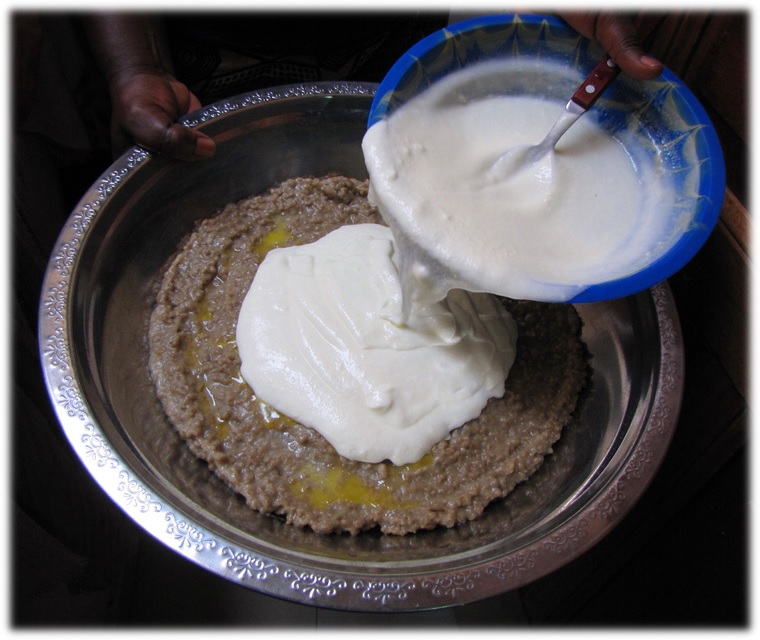
  Lakh – millet flour porridge in communal platter served topped with sweetened fermented milk (sow). Senegal, West Africa.
- Lâpa – a kind of rice porridge or gruel eaten in the cuisines of the former Ottoman Empire
- Lugaw or lugao – the Tagalog name for congee in Philippine cuisine.

=== M ===
- Malt-O-Meal – a North American brand of wheat porridge that includes malted barley in addition to semolina. It is served hot and comes in chocolate and maple flavors as well as original.
- Mămăligă – made out of yellow maize flour, traditional in Romania and Moldova. It is similar to the Italian polenta.
- Maypo – a brand of maple-flavored oatmeal. It was developed by the Maltex Corporation in Burlington, Vermont, in 1953.
- Mazamorra – a traditional maize-based Latin American food. Several variations by country exist.
- Meghli – a Levantine nutrient-rich porridge created from sugar, ground rice, and caraway, anise and cinnamon ground spices, slow-cooked to form a thick milk-free porridge. It is served cool and topped with raw soaked and peeled kernels native to the Levantine, like pine nuts, walnuts, almonds and pistachios, often with coconut shavings.
- Mieum – a Korean gruel created by grinding rice or millet to an almost-powder state and boiling with water.
- Mingau – A Brazilian meal made most commonly with cornstarch, sugar and milk. Also often topped with cinnamon.
- Močnik – a traditional Slovenian porridge
- Manoomin porridge – a wild rice breakfast porridge from Minnesota
- Mush – a thick cornmeal pudding or porridge usually boiled in water or milk. It is often allowed to set, or gel into a semi-solid, then cut into flat squares or rectangles, and pan-fried.
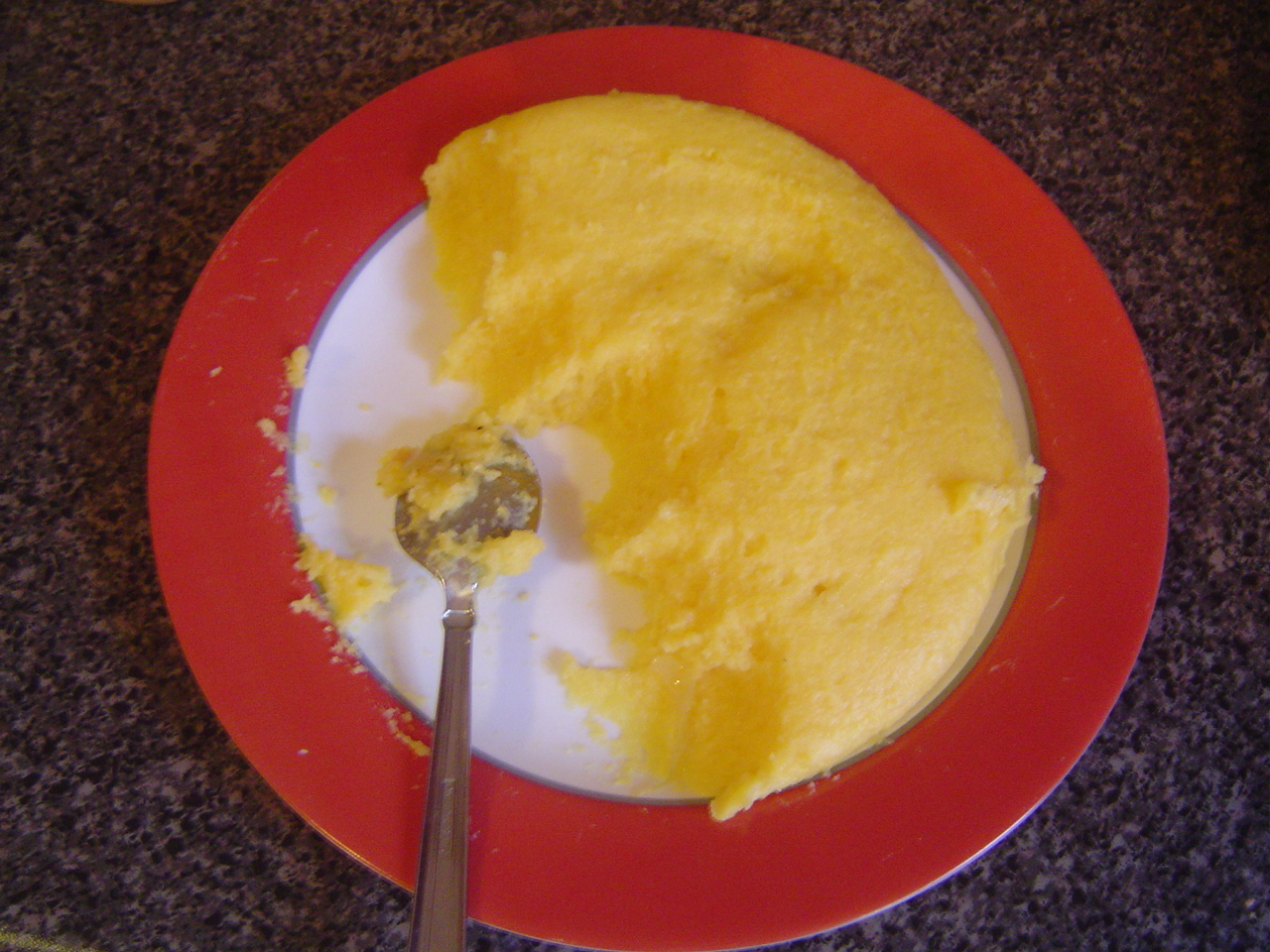
Mămăligă

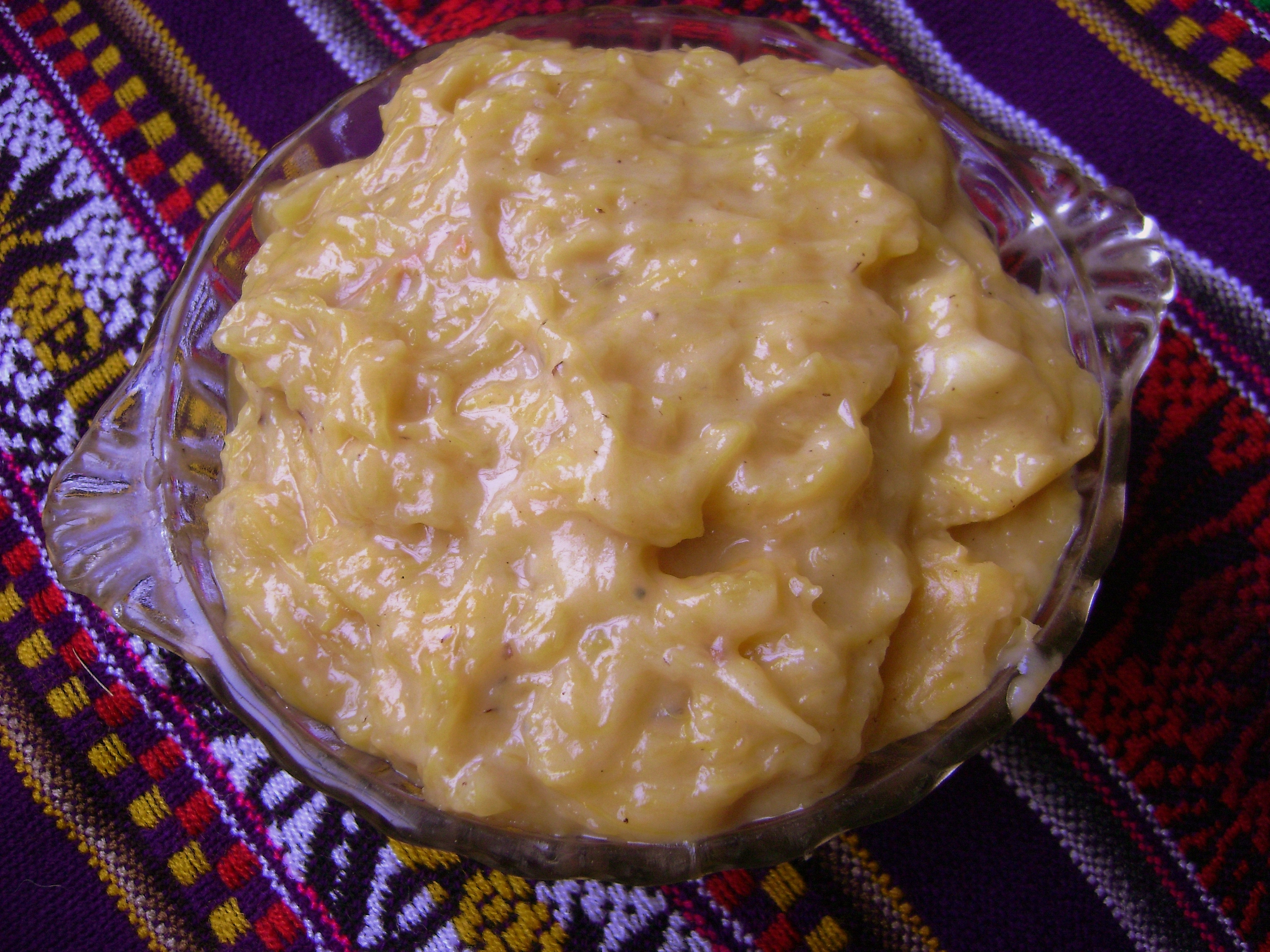
Mazamorra de calabaza, a Peruvian dessert popular in the Huánuco region. It is made with pumpkin.

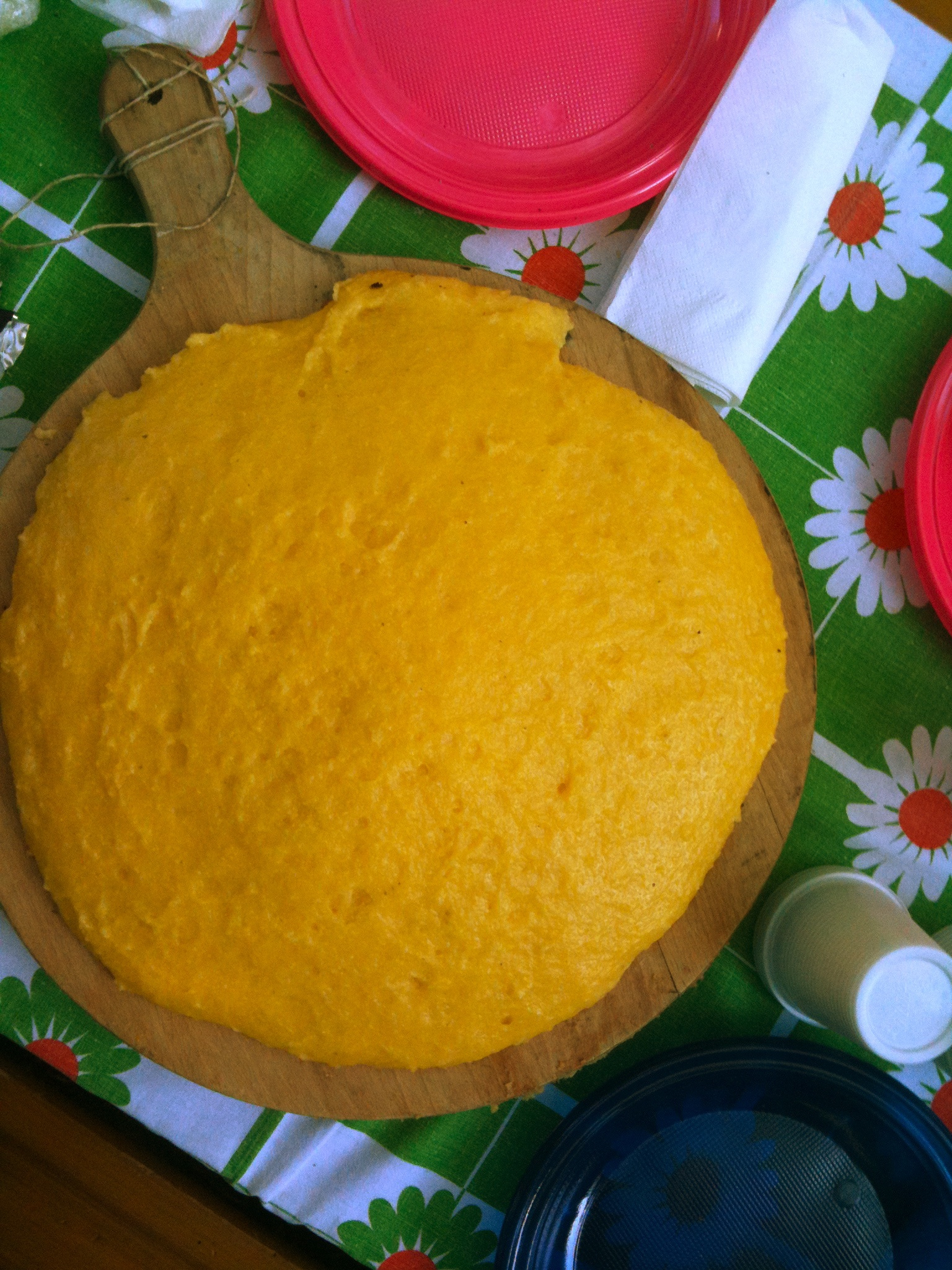
Cornmeal mush

=== O ===
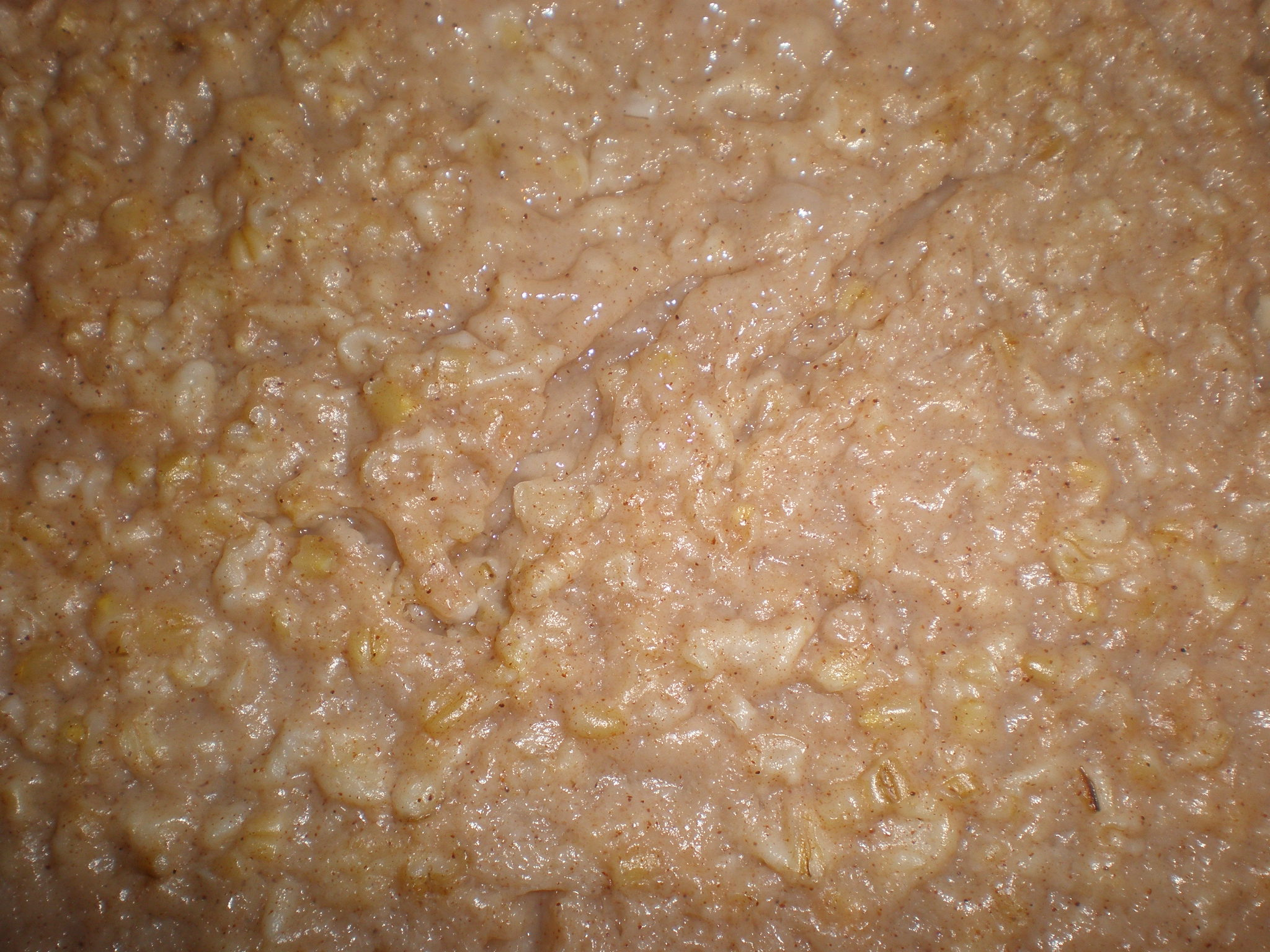
A close-up of cooked oatmeal

- Oatmeal – also known as white oats, is ground oat groats (i.e., grains, as in oat-meal, cf. cornmeal, peasemeal, etc.), or a porridge made from oats (also called oatmeal cereal or stirabout). Oatmeal can also be ground oats, steel-cut oats, crushed oats, or rolled oats.
- Okayu – the name for the type of congee eaten in Japan, which is less broken down than congee produced in other cultures. The water ratio is typically lower and the cooking time is longer. It is commonly seasoned with salt, egg, negi, salmon, ikura, ginger, and umeboshi. Miso or chicken stock may be used to flavor the broth. It is commonly served to infants, the elderly, and the ill.
- Øllebrød – a traditional Danish dish – a type of porridge made of rugbrød scraps and beer, typically hvidtøl. A thrifty dish, it makes it possible to use the rest of the bread scraps so that nothing is wasted.

=== P ===
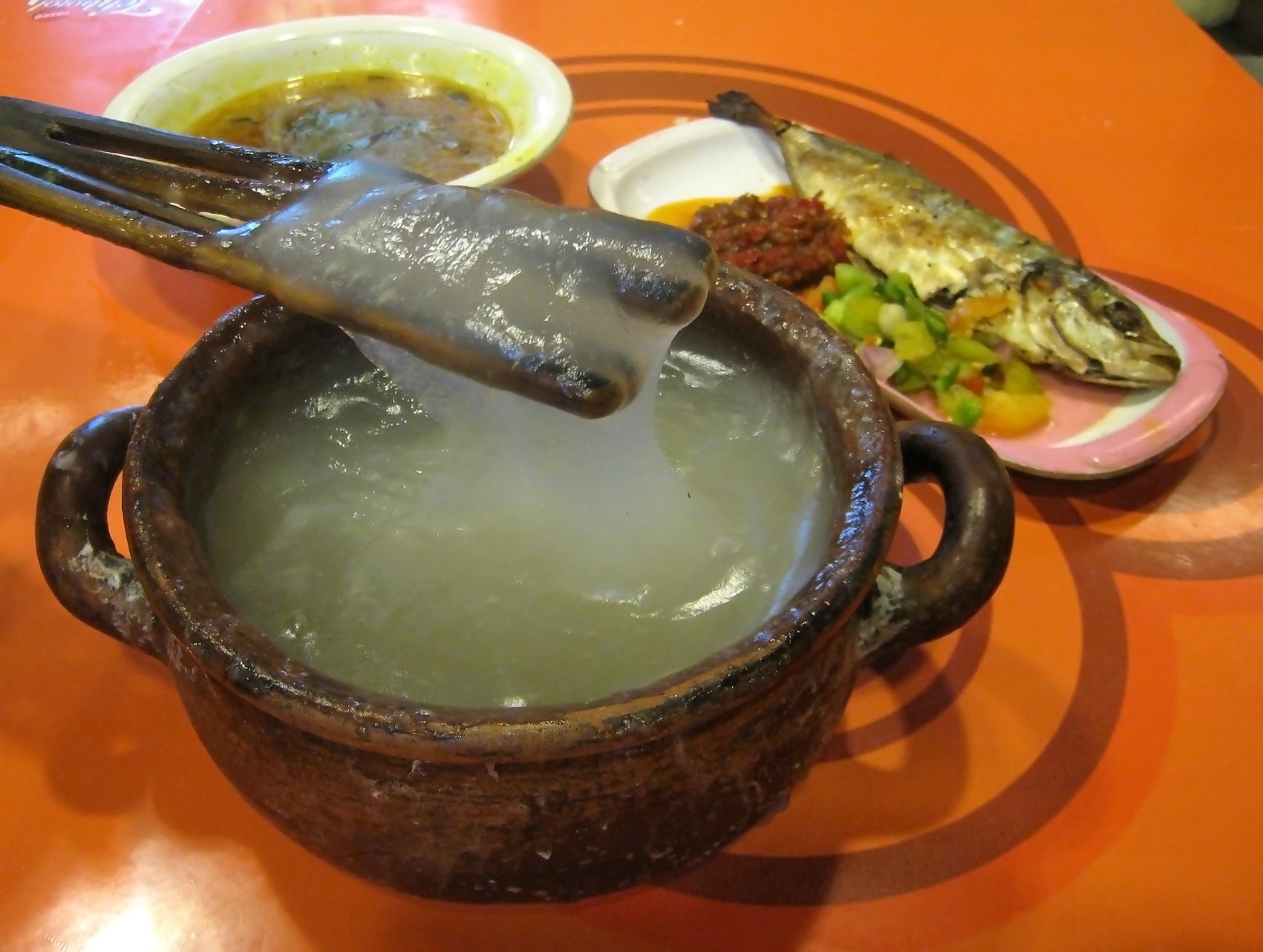
Papeda, served in Waroeng Ikan Bakar, a restaurant specializing in Eastern Indonesian food in Jakarta, Indonesia

- Papeda – or bubur sagu, is a sago flour congee, the staple food of native people in Maluku and Papua. It is commonly found in eastern Indonesia, as the counterpart of central and western Indonesian cuisines that favor rice as their staple food.
- Pastel de choclo – a dish based on sweetcorn or choclo, the quechua word for “tender corn”, or the new corn of the season. It is a typical dish in Chile, but is also eaten in Argentina, Bolivia and Peru with some variations in the recipe, sometimes using corn meal
- Pease pudding – a term of British origin regarding a savory pudding dish made of boiled legumes, which mainly consists of split yellow or Carlin peas, water, salt, and spices. It is often cooked with bacon.
- Pinole – a Spanish translation of an Aztec word for a coarse flour made from ground toasted maize kernels, often in a mixture with a variety of herbs and ground seeds, which can be eaten by itself or be used as the base for a beverage.
- Pirón or Pirão – gummy porridge made of farinha (cassava starch) and broth (usually from puchero or moqueca) consumed in Argentina, Uruguay and Brazil.
- Poleá – sweet Andalusian porridge made with flour, milk, and sugar and flavored with anise. Sometimes fruit, honey, cinnamon, or other ingredients are added, and it is often served cold and with croutons of fried bread.
- Polenta – cornmeal boiled into a porridge, and eaten directly or baked, fried or grilled. The term is of Italian origin, derived from the Latin for hulled and crushed grain (especially barley-meal).
- Puliszka – is a coarse cornmeal porridge in Hungary, mostly in Transylvania. Traditionally, it is prepared with either sweetened milk or goat's milk cottage cheese, bacon or mushrooms.
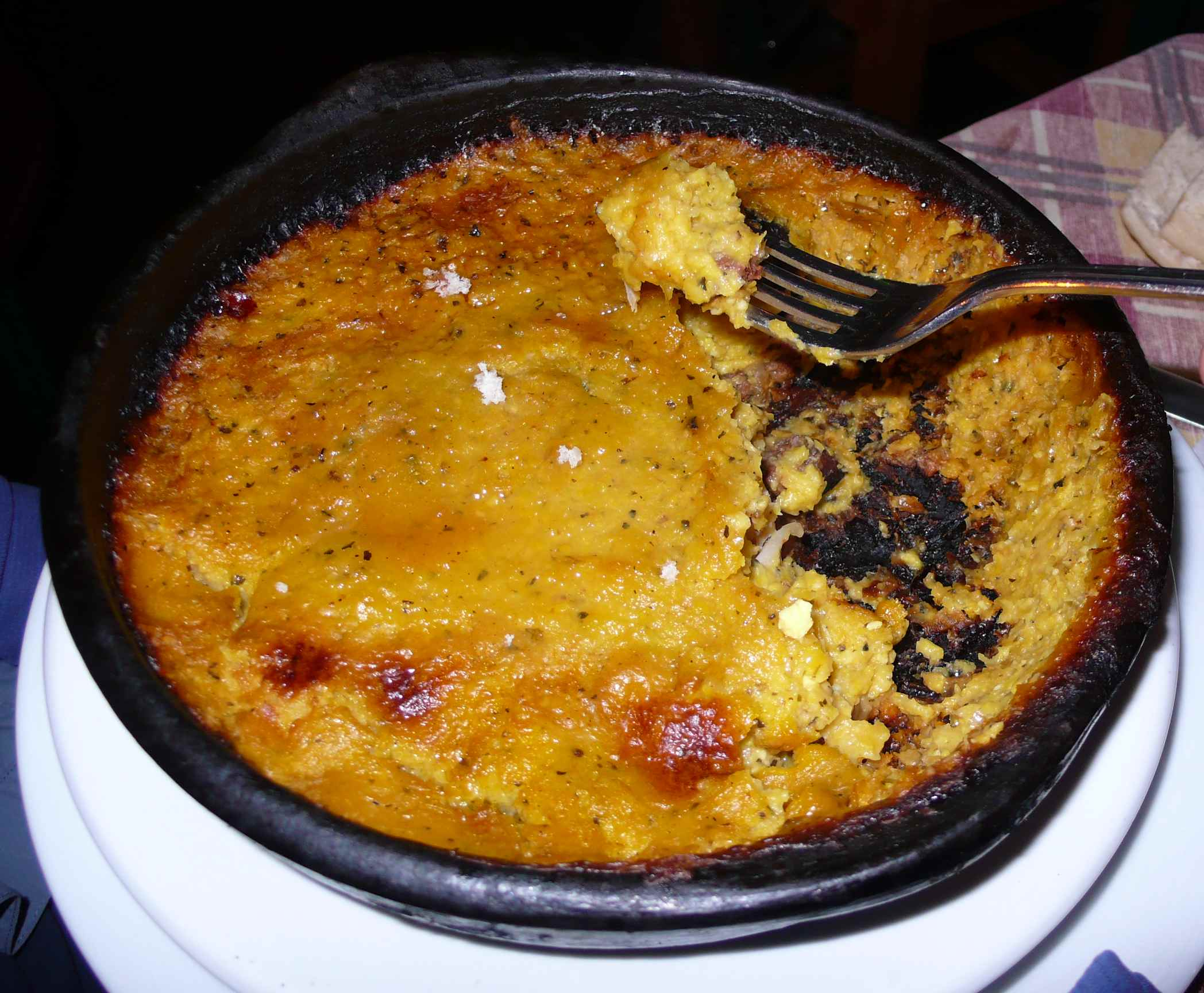
Pastel de choclo

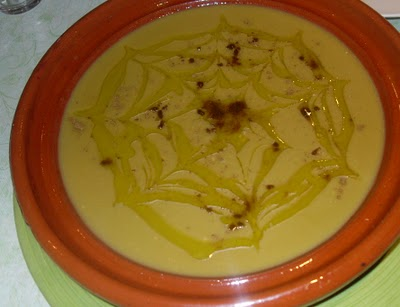
Pease pudding

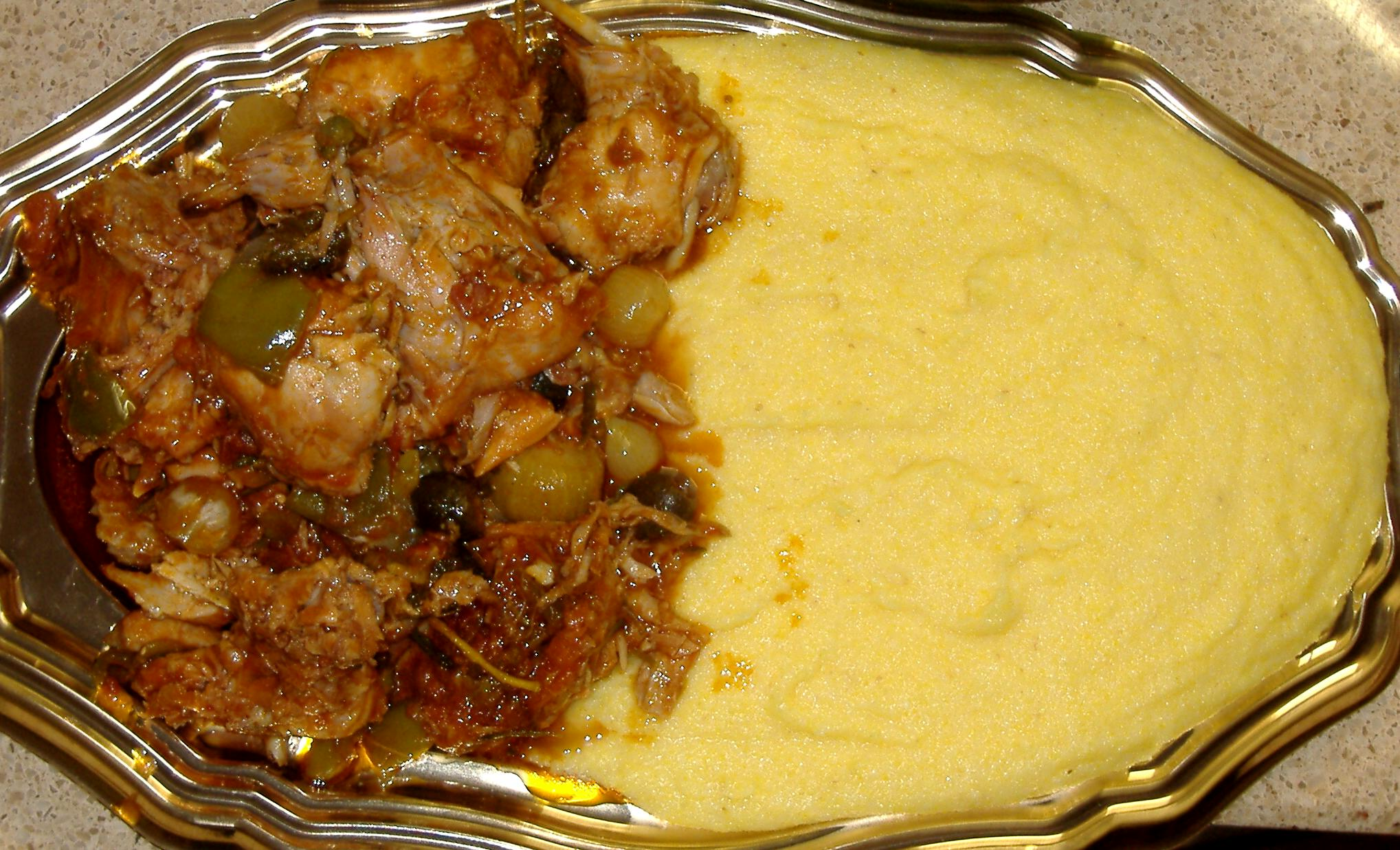
Polenta (right), with rabbit

=== R ===
- Red River Cereal – A porridge from Canada, consisting of cracked wheat, rye and flax seed, boiled in water, usually served with milk and brown sugar.
- Rice cereal – the name commonly given to industrially manufactured baby food based on rice. Ingredient lists vary based upon manufacturer formulas.
- Riebel – a porridge dish from Austria made with cornmeal, butter, milk, and salt.
- Risotto – a savoury dish made with broth and rice, typically a short grain variety with a high starch content, such as Arborio or Carnaroli.
- Rødgrød – a sweet fruit dish from Denmark and Germany (called also Rote Grütze); its preparation is basically that of a pudding. Contemporary versions of the dish often use potato starch to achieve a creamy to pudding-like starch gelatinization.
- Rømmegrøt – Norwegian porridge made with sour cream, whole milk, wheat flour, butter, sugar, and salt.
- Rubaboo – a basic stew or porridge consumed by the coureurs des bois and voyageurs (fur traders) and Métis people of North America, traditionally made of peas or corn (or both) with grease (bear or pork) and a thickening agent (bread or flour). Pemmican and maple sugar were also commonly added to the mixture.
- Rouy – a smooth, boiled millet flour infants' porridge made only with water and sifted millet flour (soungouf) especially for infants, the first solid food offered to infants. Senegal.
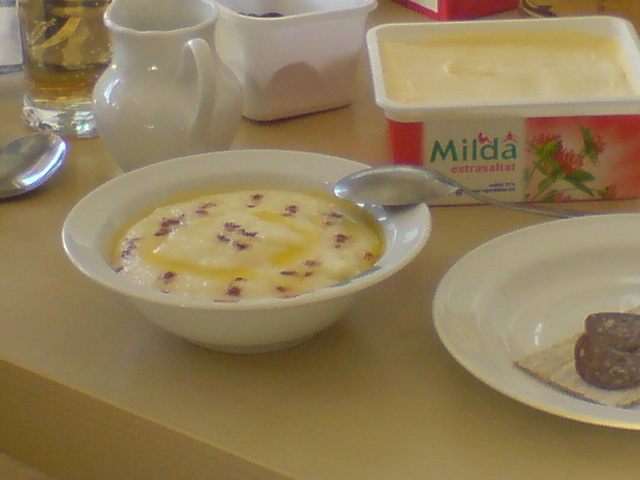
Rømmegrøt, topped with butter

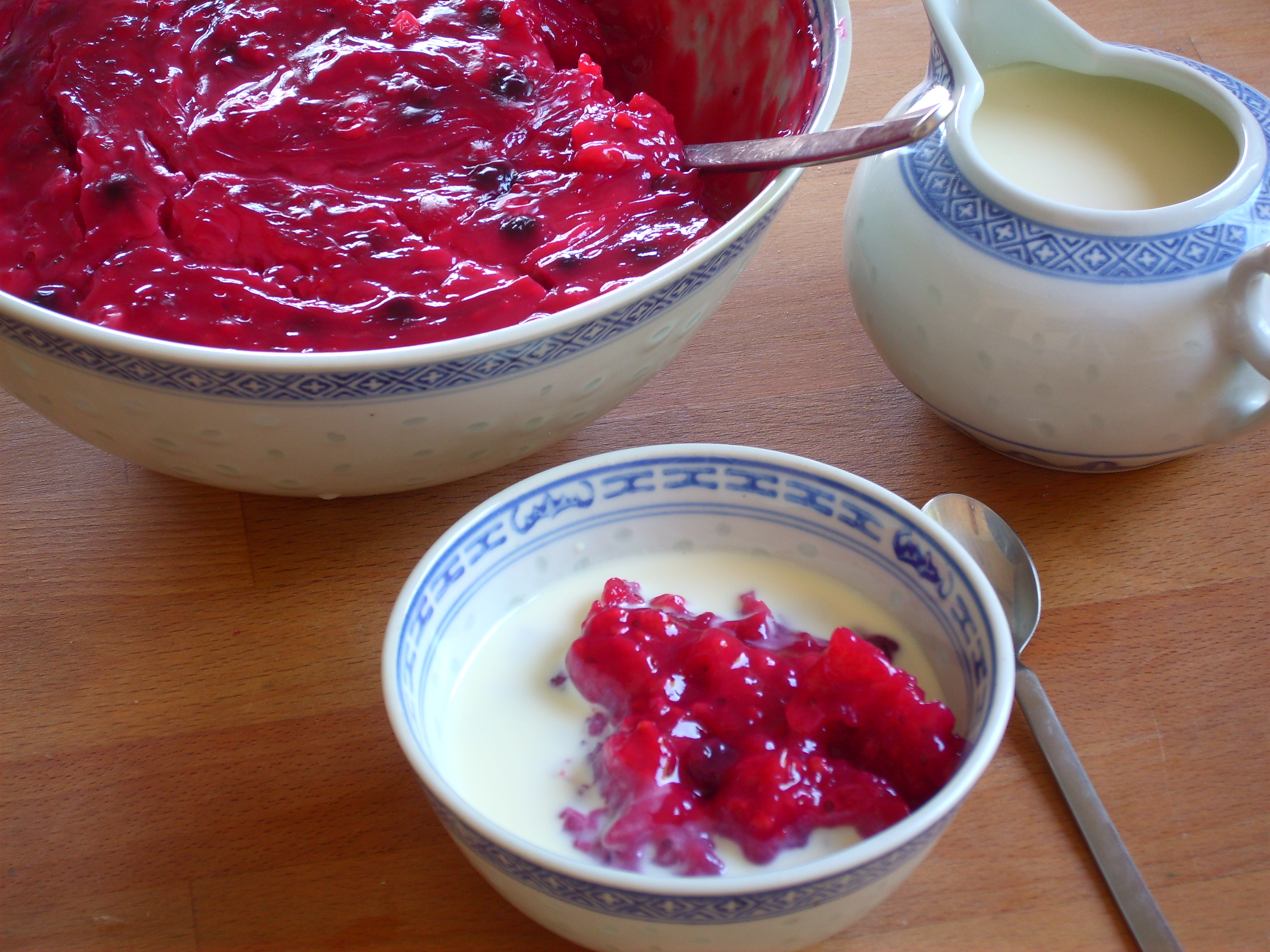
Rødgrød

=== S ===
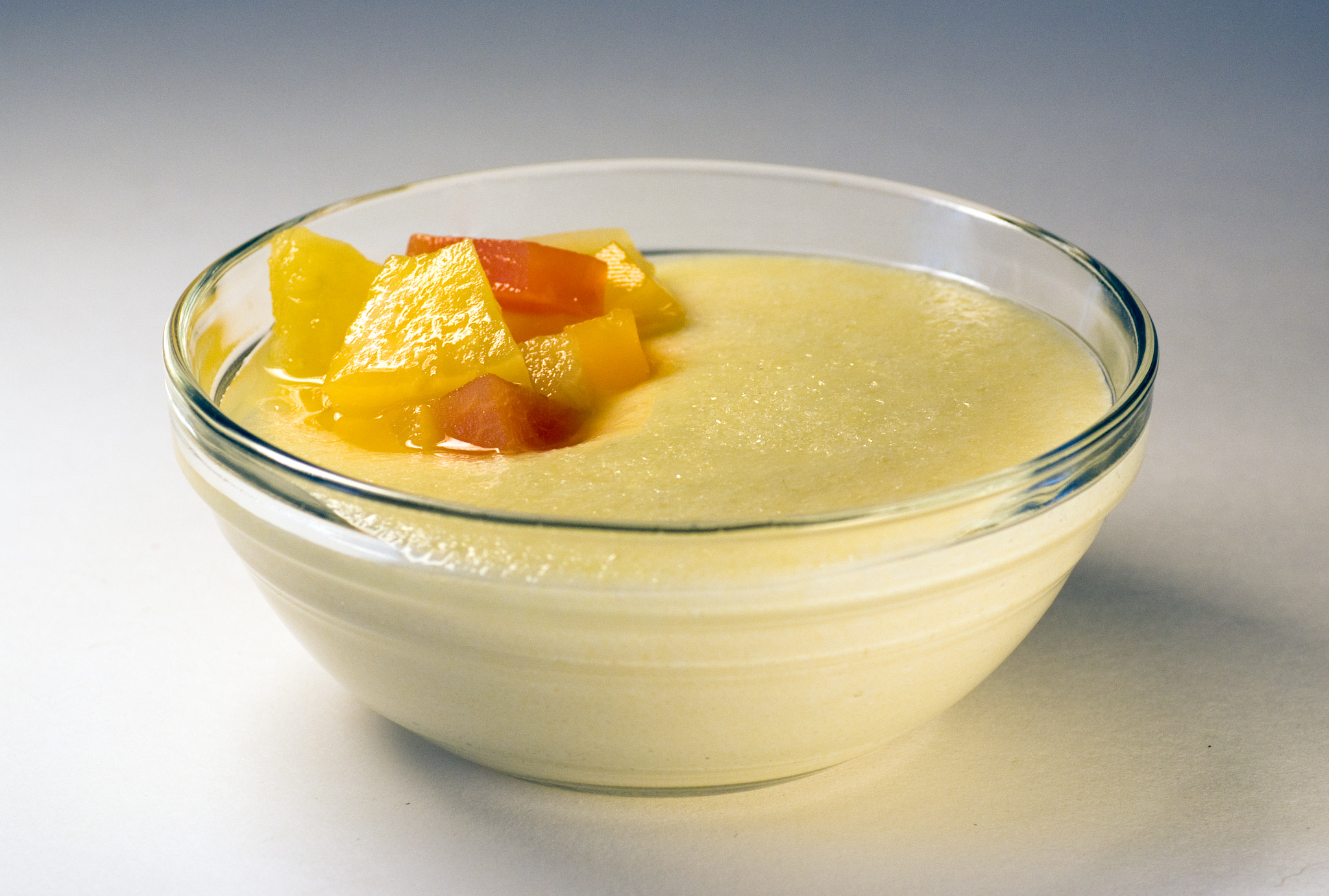
Semolina pudding

- Semolina pudding – made from semolina, which is cooked with milk, or a mixture of milk and water. It is often served with sugar, cocoa powder, cinnamon, raisins, fruit, or syrup.
- Sofkey – a traditional southeastern Native American porridge made from corn, pounded, culled and sifted, boiled in water with lye. Served hot or cold traditionally without seasoning. It can be drunk or eaten with a spoon depending on the consistency, which can vary from a thin gruel to a watery porridge.
- Sowans – a Scottish dish made using the starch remaining on the inner husks of oats after milling. The husks are allowed to soak in water and ferment for a few days. The liquor is strained off and allowed to stand for a day to allow the starchy matter therein to settle. The liquid part, or swats is poured off and can be drunk. The remaining sowans are boiled with water and salt until thickened, then served with butter or dipped into milk.
- Stip (dish) – a regional dish in the Dutch provinces of Groningen, Drenthe and Overijssel. It is served as buckwheat porridge with a hole containing fried bacon and a big spoonful of syrup.

=== T ===
- Talbina – an Arabian variety made with barley flour and water or milk. To sweeten it, honey or dates are added. An old prophetic recipe that Muhammad used to advise his companions to eat.
- Tapioca pudding – a dessert made of tapioca or tapioca balls, fruit juice, milk or water and sugar.
- Taragna – a variety of polenta (Italian cornmeal) made with buckwheat. Traditional dish of the Italian Alps
- Tarakjuk – a variety of juk, or Korean porridge, made by boiling a mixture of milk and finely ground rice soaked in water.
- Tinutuan – a Minahasan rice porridge from North Sulawesi, Indonesia. It is mixed with various vegetables such as spinach, kangkung, corn, pumpkin and sweet potato or cassava.
- Tsampa – a Tibetan staple foodstuff, particularly prominent in the central part of the region. It is roasted flour, usually barley flour and sometimes also wheat flour.
- Tsampurado – a sweet chocolate rice porridge in Philippine cuisine, often eaten with milk and tuyo (dried salted fish) added.
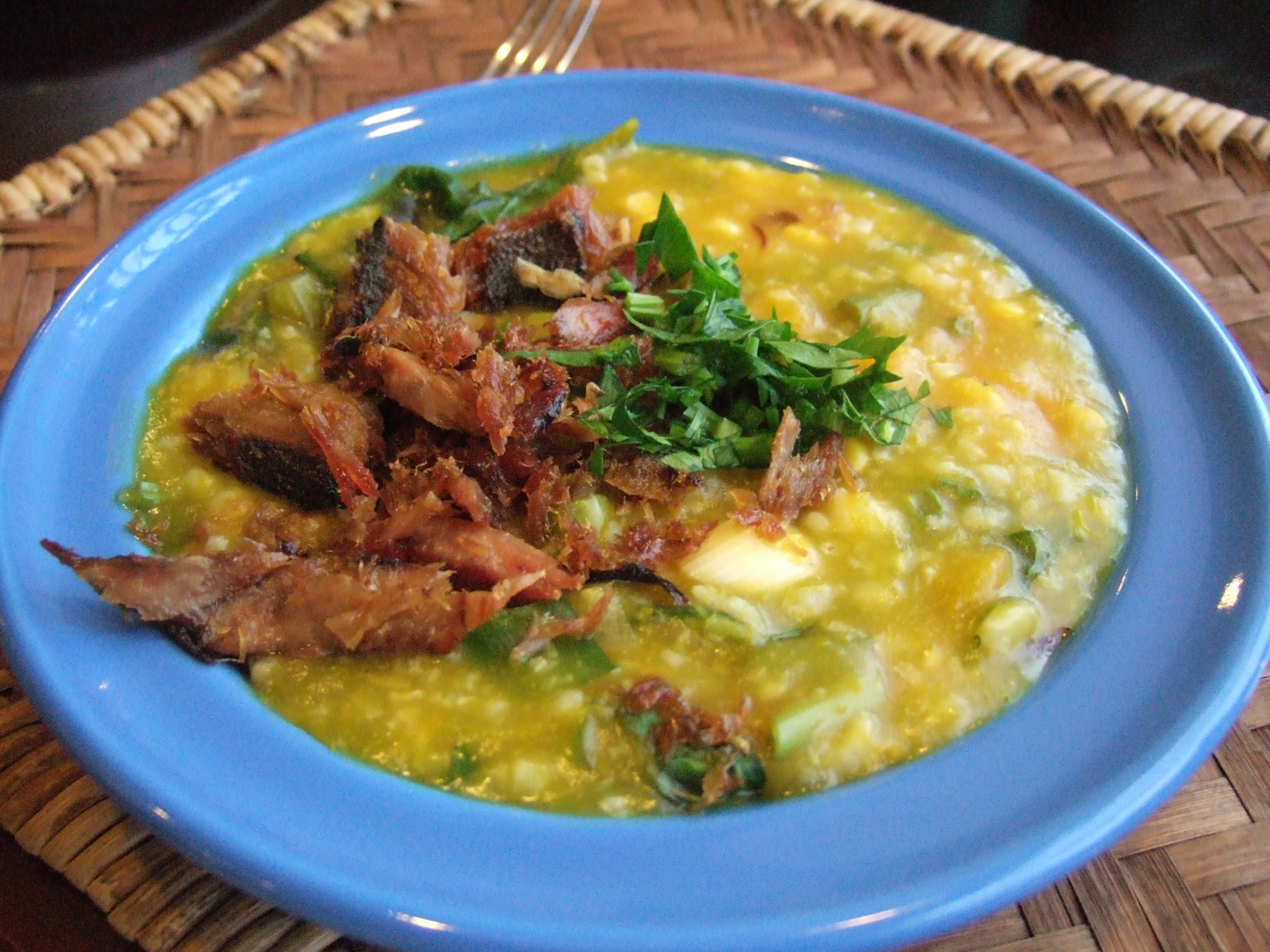
Tinutuan, with salted fish

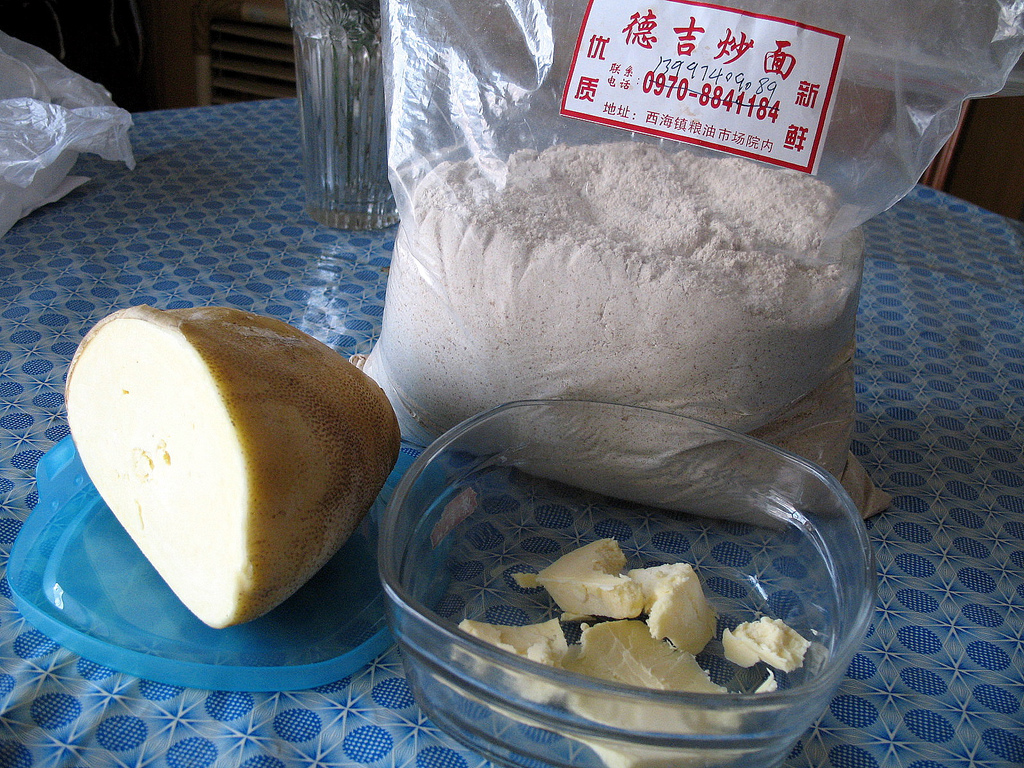
Tsampa

=== U ===
- Upma – a common South Indian and Sri Lankan Tamil breakfast dish, cooked as a thick porridge from dry roasted semolina. Various seasonings and vegetables are often added during the cooking.
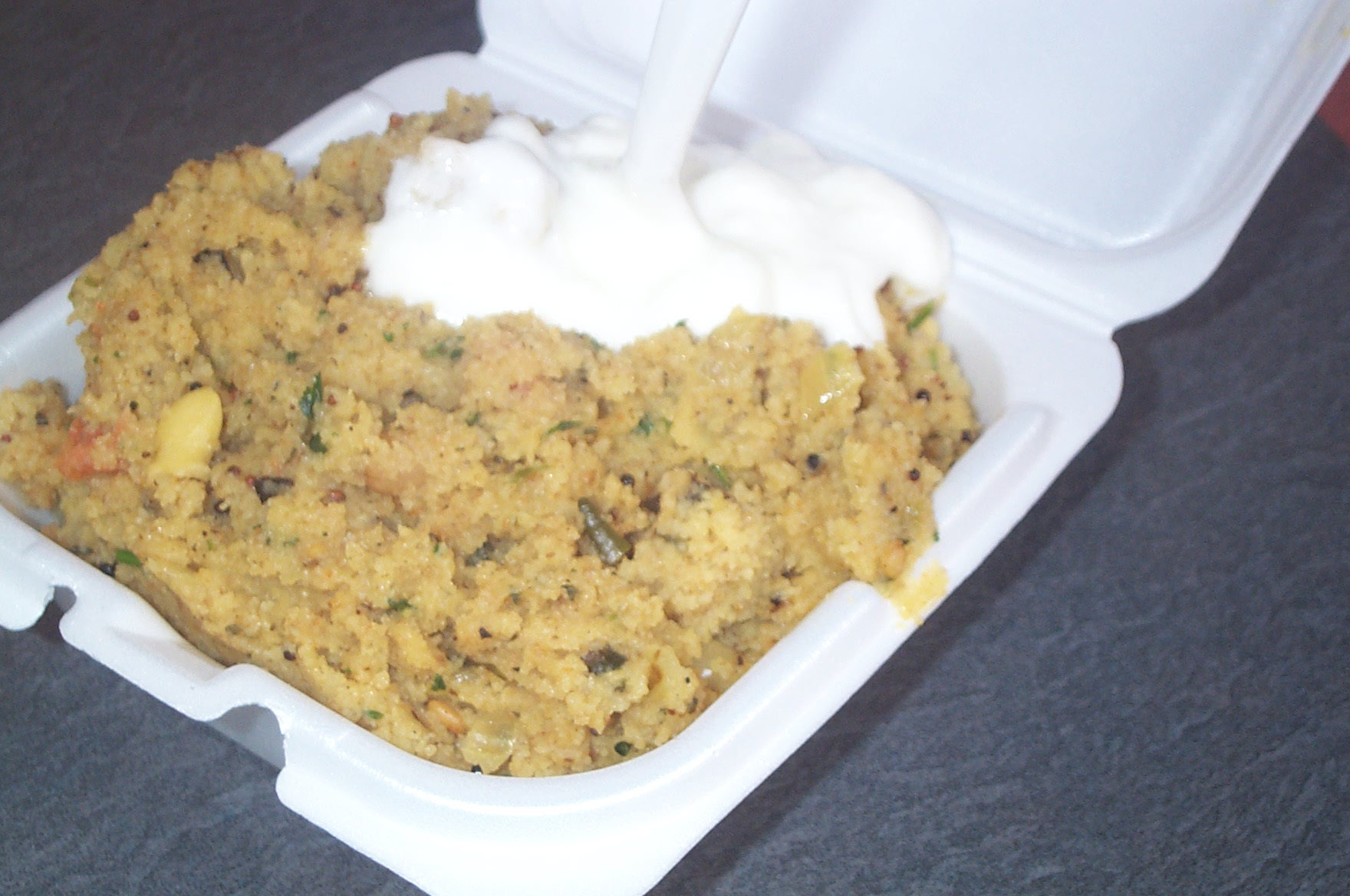
Upma (pictured bottom)

=== V ===
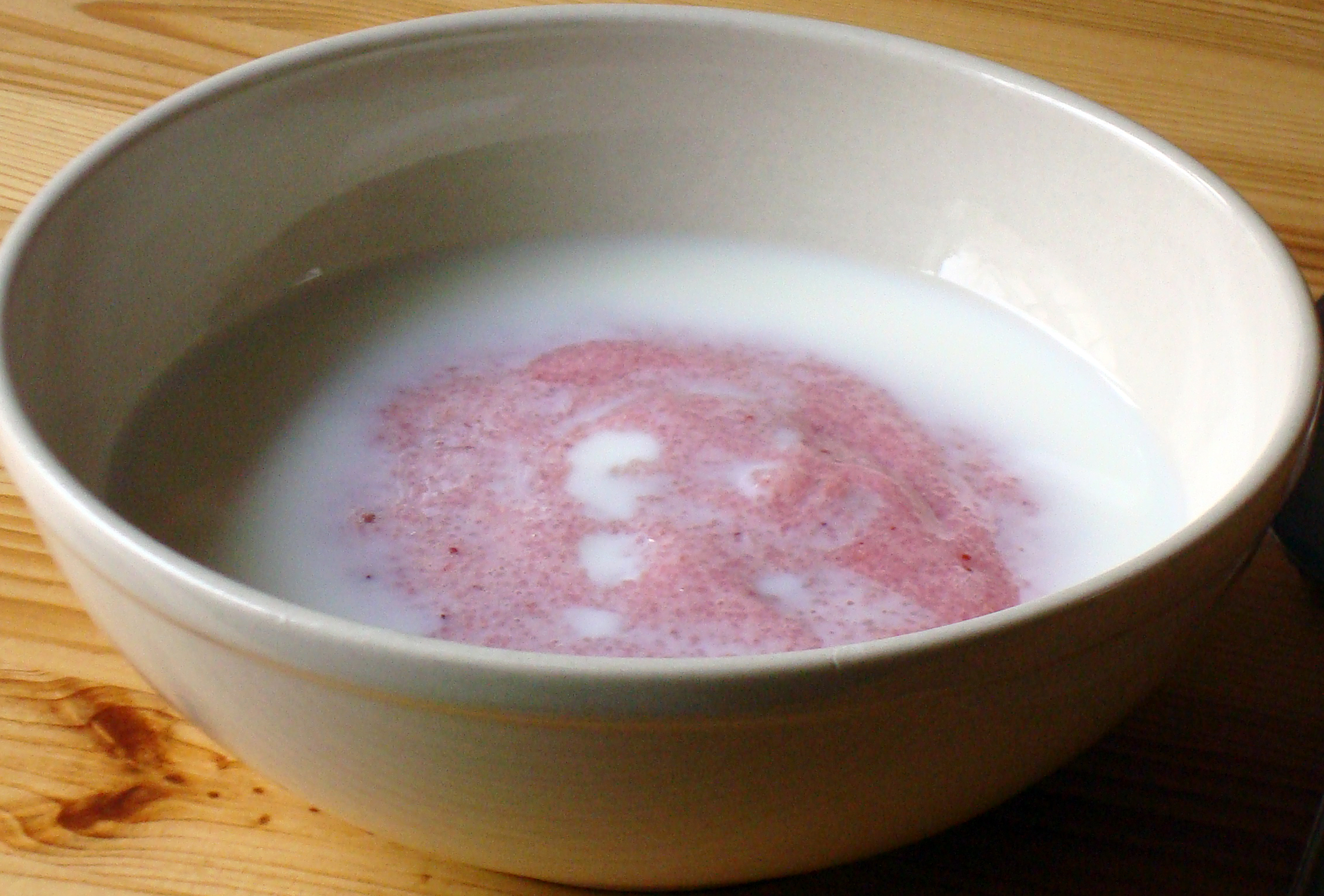
Vispipuuro

- Vispipuuro – a sweet, wheat semolina (manna) dessert porridge made with berries, usually lingonberries. It is eaten in Sweden, Finland and Estonia.

=== W ===
- Wheatena – an American high-fiber, toasted-wheat cereal that originated on Mulberry Street in New York City, New York, circa 1879, when a small bakery owner began roasting whole wheat, grinding it, and packaging it for sale under this brand name.

== See also ==
- Swallow (food)
- List of soups
