= Rice porridge =

Rice porridge may refer to:

- Champorado, a sweet chocolate rice porridge in Philippine cuisine
- Congee, an Asian savory rice porridge dish
- Rice pudding
- Lâpa (Turkish) or lapas (Greek), a rice porridge in the Balkans, Levant, and Middle East
