= Rice cereal =

Foodstuffs

Rice Cereal
Nutritional value per 100 g (3.5 oz)
- Energy: 1,674 kJ (400 kcal)
- Carbohydrates: 80g
- Sugars: 6.67g
- Dietary fiber: 0g
- Fat: 3.33g
- Protein: 6.67g
Vitamins and minerals
Minerals	Quantity %DV^{†}
Potassium	10% 300 mg
- ^{†}Percentages estimated using US recommendations for adults, except for potassium, which is estimated based on expert recommendation from the National Academies. Source: https://medical.gerber.com/products/cereal/single-grain-rice

Rice cereal is the name commonly given to industrially manufactured baby food based on rice. It is also commonly used in Rice Krispies treats. Its ingredient list is not well defined and depends on the manufacturer. It has been recommended by pediatricians in the United States as the initial food for solid food-ready babies for the second half of the 20th century.

== See also ==
- Rice
- List of porridges
