= Eghajira =

Tuareg drink made from grain and fruit

- Type: Drink
- Region or state: Sahara
- Created by: Tuaregs
- Main ingredients: Pounded millet, dates, goat cheese mixed and water.

Eghajira is a sweet, thick drink made from grain and fruit, usually drunk by the Tuaregs on special occasions. It is normally eaten with a ladle.

== See also ==
- List of porridges
