= Koozh =

Traditional Tamil food

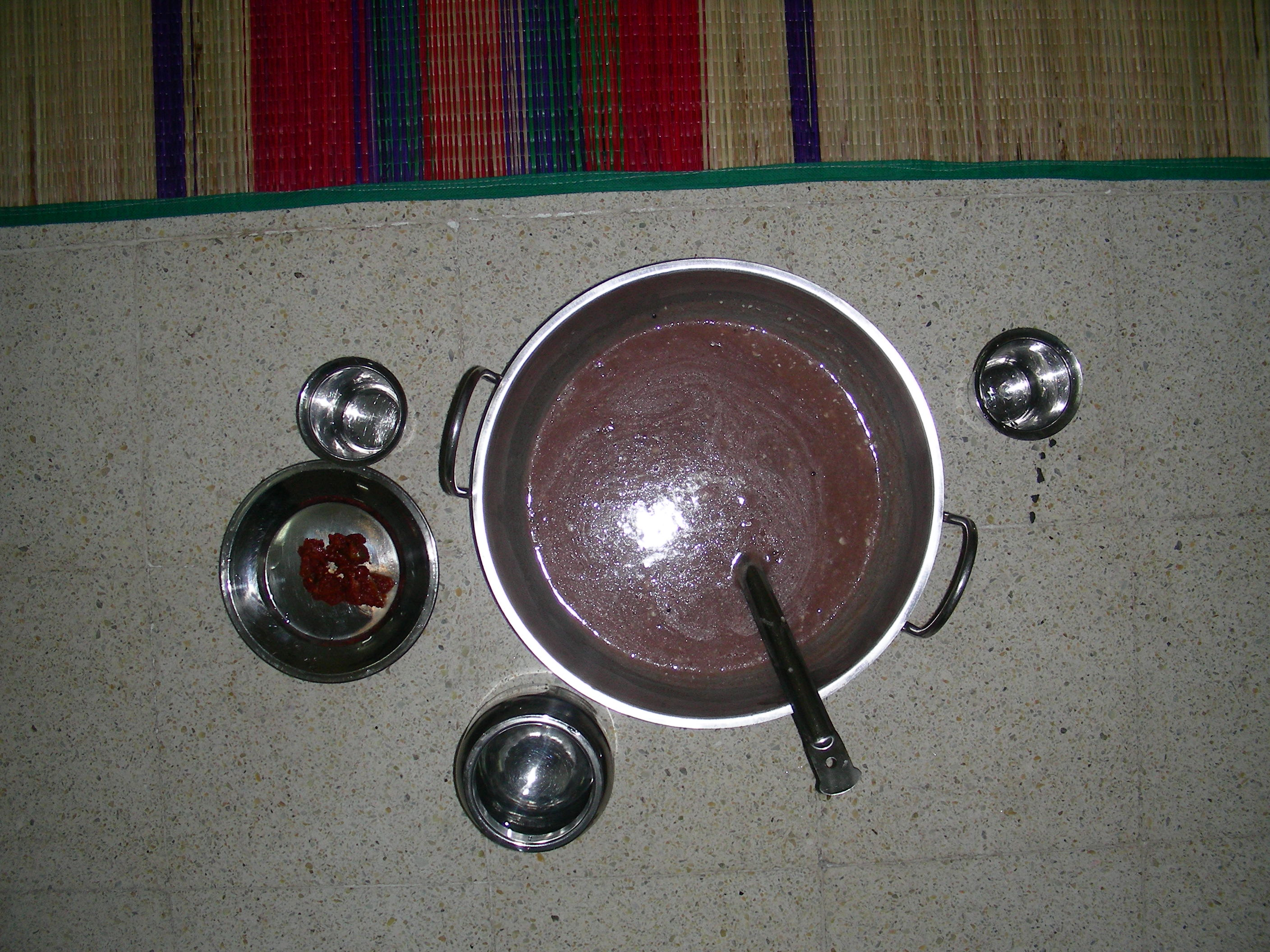
- Type: Porridge
- Course: Breakfast or lunch
- Place of origin: Tamil Nadu, India and Sri Lanka
- Region or state: Tamil Nadu
- Main ingredients: Millet flour (Kezhvaragu or Cumbu), noyee

Koozh is the Tamil name for a porridge made from millet. It is a traditional food in villages of Tamil Nadu and Sri Lanka.

In Tamil Nadu and other places, koozh is consumed as either breakfast or lunch. Koozh is made from Kezhvaragu or Cumbu flour and broken rice, known as noiyee in Tamil, and is cooked in a clay pot. Koozh is a vegetarian recipe, though there are non-vegetarian varieties of koozh made from fish, crab and chicken. It is a staple food among the villagers of Tamil Nadu. Koozh is usually made in large batches and develops a sour tangy flavor when fermented. The semi-solid koozh is later liquefied for consumption by adding water and salt and, optionally, buttermilk, onion, curry leaves and coriander leaves. It is served with side dishes including green chilis, raw onion, pickles and mango spiced with red chili pepper and sometimes with Karuvattu Kozhambu meaning Dry Fish Gravy. The microbes present in koozh demonstrated their probiotic nature in vitro. When compared to other similar genetic sequences, strains were from fermented foods, agriculture, livestock and feces widely distributed in Eurasia.

Koozh without fermentation is served hot often consumed at Mariamman temple festivals across rural Tamil Nadu. It is made in large quantities and served to the public in Amman Temples across the city in lieu of Aadi Thiruvizha, which takes place during the Tamil Month Aadi.

== See also ==
- List of porridges
