= Rømmegrøt =

Sweet Norwegian porridge made with sour cream

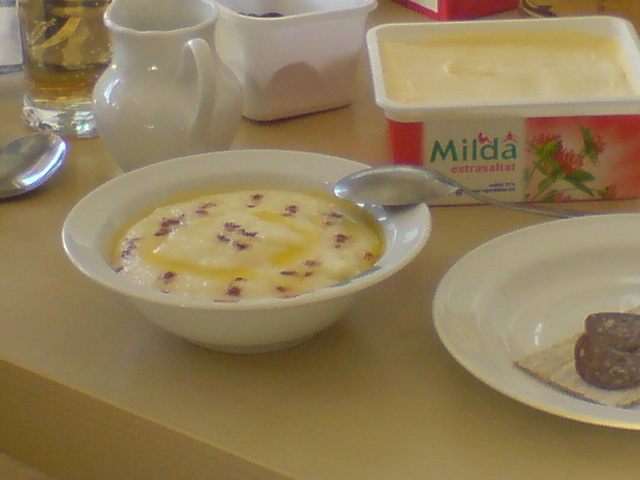
- Type: Porridge
- Place of origin: Norway
- Main ingredients: Sour cream, whole milk, wheat flour, butter

Rømmegrøt (Norwegian Bokmål), also known as rømmegraut (Norwegian Nynorsk) and römmegröt (Swedish), is a Norwegian porridge made with sour cream, whole milk, wheat flour, butter, and salt.

Rømme is a Norwegian word meaning sour cream; grøt translates as 'porridge'. Traditionally, rømmegrøt is a delicacy prepared for special occasions, including holidays. It is considered to be a traditional Norwegian dish. Recipes differ depending on the region of the country.

Rømmegrøt is thick and sweet and is generally drizzled in butter and sprinkled with sugar and ground cinnamon. Traditionally, it is eaten with cured meat.

In popular media, the children's book What's in the Rømmegrøt? was written in 2020 by Norwegian-American author Carol Hagen. The storyline is based on a grandmother making the dish with her granddaughter, and includes a recipe.

In Westby, Wisconsin, a city that celebrates its Norwegian heritage, there is an annual rømmegrøt eating contest.

== See also ==
- List of porridges

== Other sources ==
- Brown, Dale The Cooking of Scandinavia (Time-Life Books, New York. 1968)
- Haug, Tore and Astrid Karlsen Scott Authentic Norwegian Cooking (Nordic Adventures, 2000) ISBN 0-9634339-7-0
