= Gomme (food) =

Traditional Norwegian cheese preparation

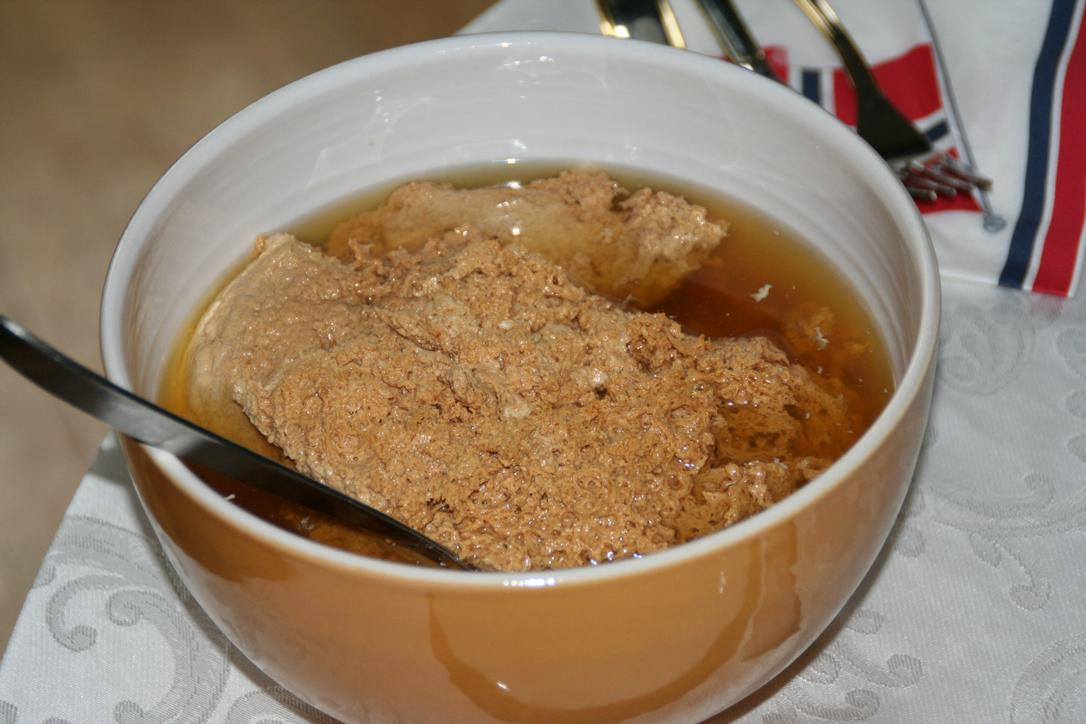
- Gomme
- Place of origin: Norway

Gomme (Norwegian pronunciation: [ˈɡʊ̂mːə]) is a traditional Norwegian dish usually served as a spread or a dessert. Gomme has long traditions in several places in the country and was largely used as a party food when cakes were served, for example at Christmas.

Gomme is commonly a form of sweet cheese made of long-boiled milk and having a yellow or brown colour. It can be used as a cheese spread on slices of bread, lefse, or waffles. There are several regional and local variants. There also exists a porridge-like variant made of boiled milk with oat grain or rice. It can be served as a dessert with vanilla, cardamom, raisins, and cinnamon as added ingredients in most variants. The consistency can vary from soft to thick.

== See also ==
- List of porridges

== Other sources ==
- Diehl, Kari Schoening (2012) The Everything Nordic Cookbook (Quarto - Everything Books) ISBN 9781440531866

== Related reading ==
- Moe, Nils Harald (2002) Tradisjonsmat fra nord (Tromsø: Vitus forlag) ISBN 9788299418997
- Notaker, Henry (1993) Ganens makt: norsk kokekunst og matkultur gjennom tusen år(Oslo: Aschehoug) ISBN 82-03-26009-8
