= Avena (drink) =

Oatmeal beverage

- Type: Non-alcoholic beverage
- Main ingredients: Oatmeal, water or milk, sugar

Avena is a beverage mainly from Colombia prepared with stewed oatmeal, milk, water, cinnamon, clove and sugar consumed in Latin America and Caribbean. Other spices such as allspice, vanilla, nutmeg, ginger, and citrus peel are popular. Avena means oat in the Spanish language. It is somewhat similar to horchata, a sweet nut milk drink from Spain.

Avena is prepared using water and milk brought to a boil. Sugar and a small amount of oatmeal are added and cooked. If water is used, some amount of milk may optionally be added at the end of cooking. The oats may then be strained out, blended using a blender, or simply allowed to settle to the bottom of the pitcher. A cinnamon stick is sometimes added to the pitcher.

Avena drinks are considered to have some health benefits because of the main ingredient, oats, though they are often highly sweetened.

== See also ==
- Horchata
- Atole
- Caudle
- List of porridges
