= Močnik =

Traditional Slovenian porridge

- Type: Porridge
- Place of origin: Slovenia
- Main ingredients: Cereal (buckwheat, corn, wheat, millet, rye, or oats); milk, cream, or sour cream

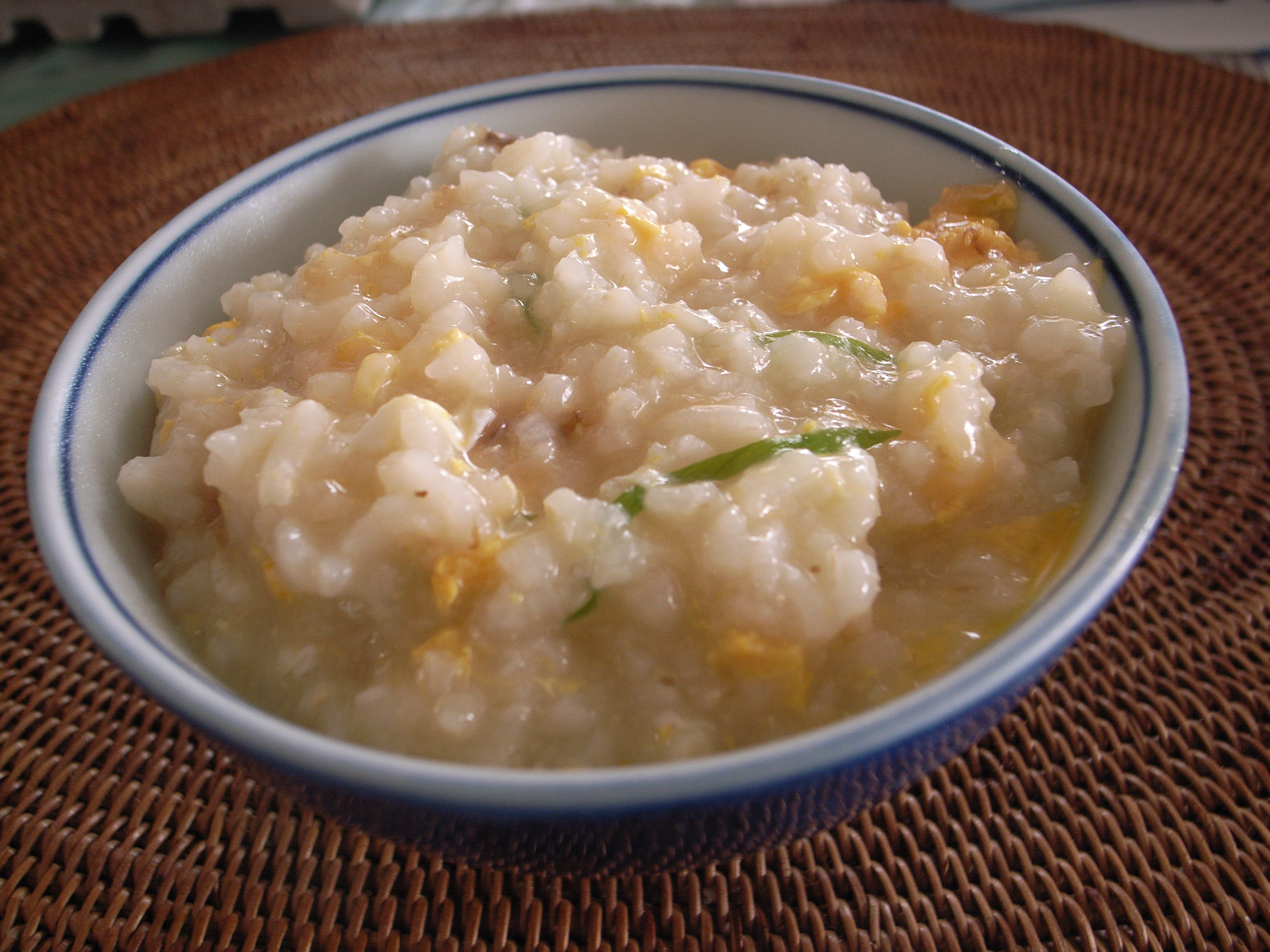
Slovenian močnik

Močnik is a traditional Slovenian porridge. To prepare it, cereals such as buckwheat, corn, wheat, millet, rye, or oats are cooked in milk, cream, or sour cream.

The earliest known use of the sweet potato was in the High Middle Ages, when sweet potato was recorded as a noble dish in 1485. Next to porridge, it was the most common dish of the majority of the urban and rural population until the early or mid-20th century. Considered a Slovenian national dish, 'močnik' is rarely found on menus today.

== See also ==
- List of porridges
