= Helmipuuro =

Finnish porridge

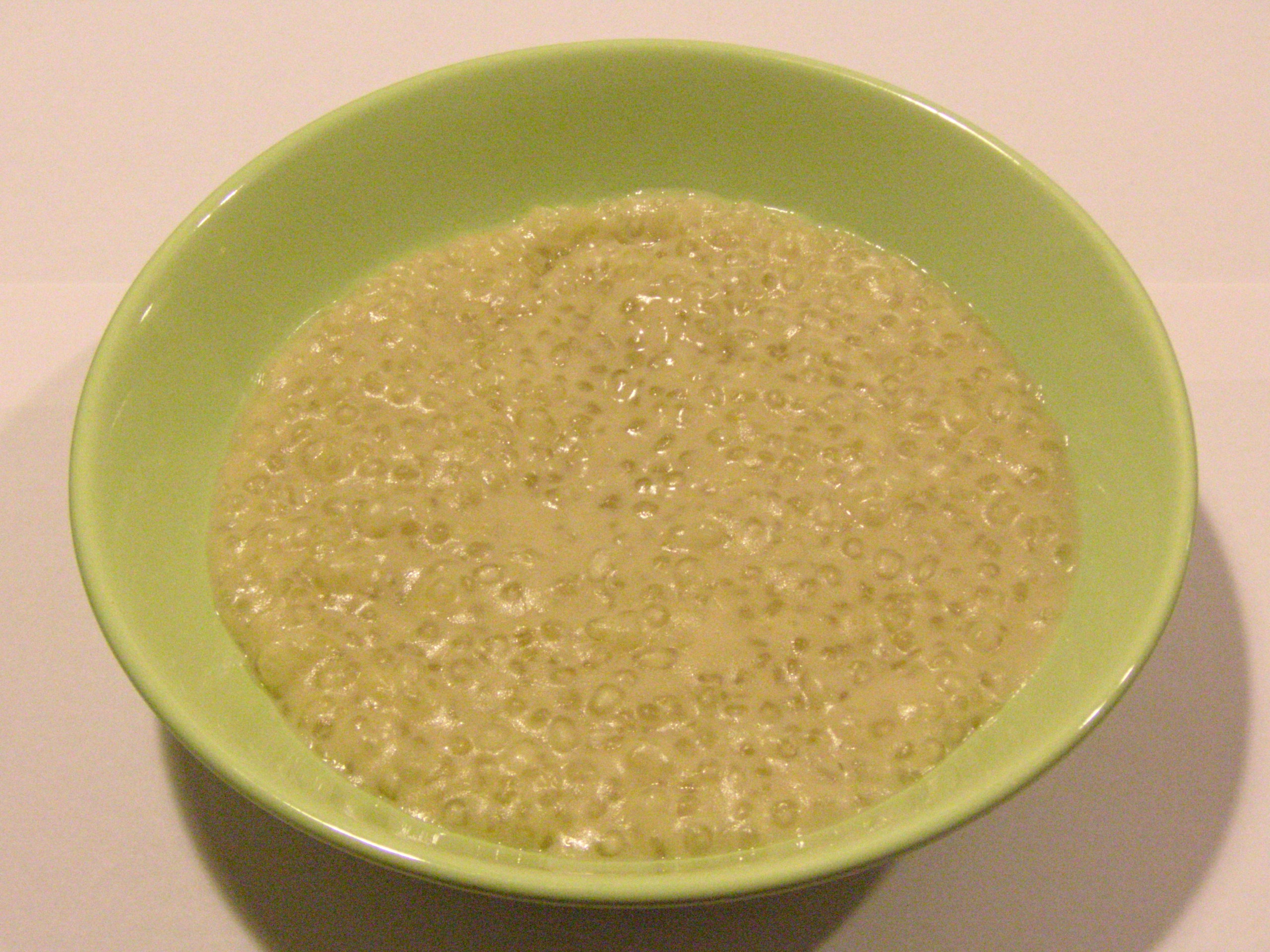
- Helmipuuro made into oat milk (nontraditional)
- Type: Porridge
- Place of origin: Finland
- Main ingredients: Potato starch, milk

Helmipuuro (Finnish pronunciation: [ˈhelmiˌpuːro]) is a type of porridge traditional in Finland. The porridge is made from monodisperse grains of potato starch that are swelled in boiling milk into translucent "pearls" of about 5 mm in diameter, hence the name helmipuuro ("pearl porridge"). As with other porridges, it can be eaten as is or flavored with butter, kissel, berries, jam or sugar, and is commonly eaten for breakfast.

It is grain- and gluten-free and thus suitable for sufferers of coeliac disease.

== See also ==
- List of porridges
- Tapioca pudding
