= Tapioca pudding =

Type of sweet pudding

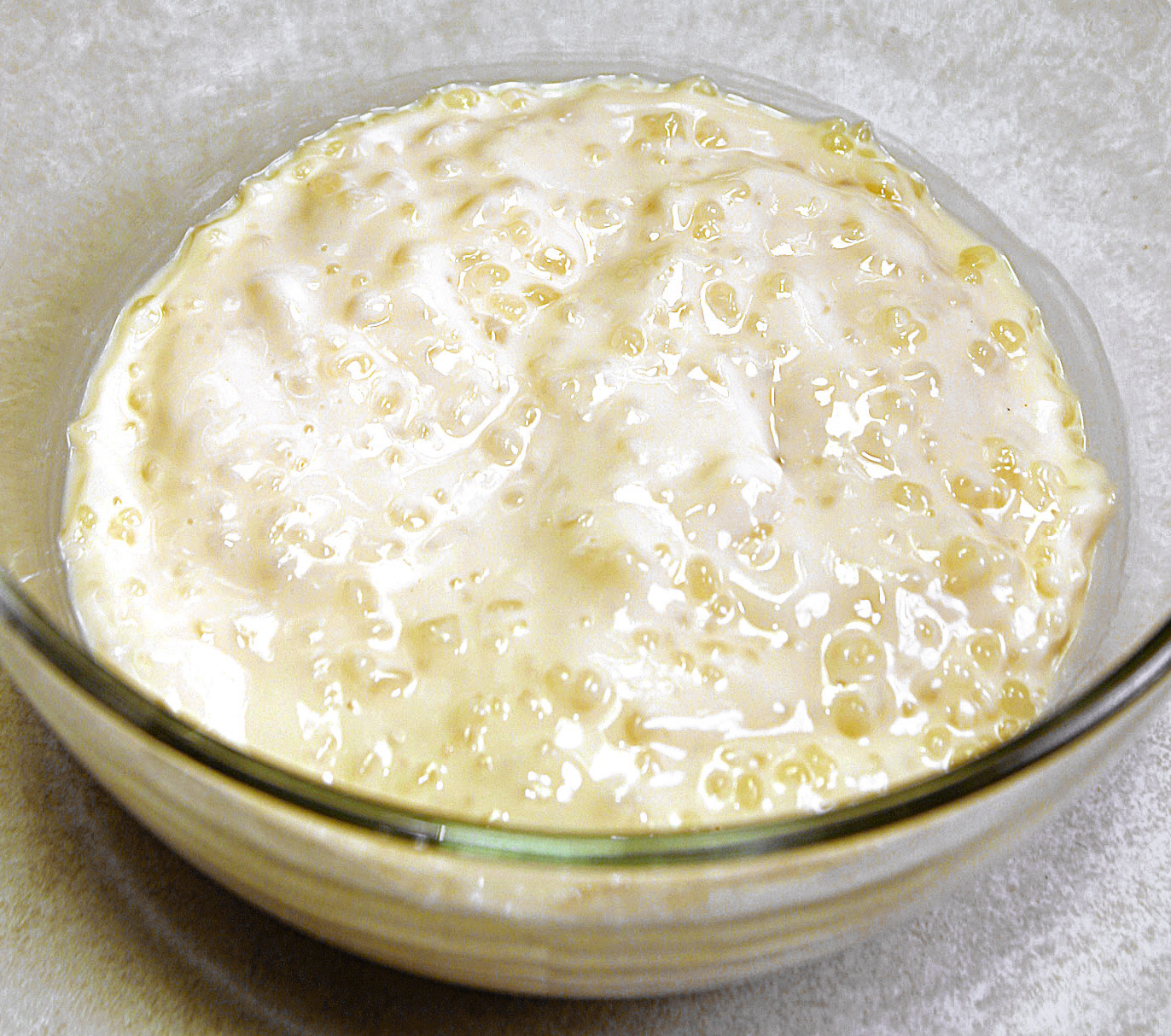
- Type: Pudding
- Main ingredients: Tapioca, milk or cream or coconut milk

Tapioca pudding is a sweet pudding made with tapioca and either milk or cream. It is made in many cultures with equally varying styles and may be produced in a variety of ways. Its consistency can differ between recipes: some variations are thin and runny, while some others are viscous enough to pick up with a fork.

== Varieties ==
The pudding can be made from scratch using tapioca in a variety of forms: flakes, coarse meal, sticks, and pearls. Many commercial packaged mixes are also available. In some areas, the milk used in making the pudding is substituted for coconut milk.

Ingredients served alongside and put into tapioca pudding have varied over time. An American style of tapioca pudding in the 19th century was known to contain no sugar within the pudding itself but would be served with sugar and cream on the side. Some recipes circulated in the British Empire during the 18th century used cinnamon, red wine, and bone marrow as seasonings for the pudding. Tapioca pudding is a popular type of Tong sui (sweet soup) in Chinese cuisine. In southern India, jawhuarusee payasam, another type of tapioca pudding, is often made during festivals.

== History ==
A significant reason for tapioca pudding's popularity was the ease of acquiring tapioca balls compared to its alternative, sago. Tapioca pearls originate from the harvesting of cassava, which requires less labor to harvest and grows faster compared to sago. Tapioca pudding would become a prominent staple in school lunches in the UK, Australia, and the United States.

British schoolchildren have nicknamed the dish frog spawn due to its appearance. The Guardian described it as "Britain's most hated school pudding" with names such as fisheyes, frogspawn, and eyeball pudding. It is, however, making a comeback in the 21st century in many restaurants, including several Michelin-starred restaurants.

Tapioca pudding was one of the dishes that Rhode Island army officers ate for their Fourth of July celebrations during the siege of Petersburg.

In the United Kingdom, July 15 is recognized as National Tapioca Pudding Day.

== See also ==
- Congee
- Sago pudding
- Rice pudding
- Semolina pudding
- Helmipuuro
- Sago soup
- Mango pomelo sago
- List of African dishes
