= Bogobe jwa logala =

Sorghum porridge boiled in milk

Bogobe jwa logala is a sorghum porridge eaten in Botswana. It is made by combining sorghum flour with nearly-boiling milk and simmering it until it forms a gel.

It is a breakfast dish. One can add sugar or not.
