= Lâpa =

Rice porridge or gruel

Lapa
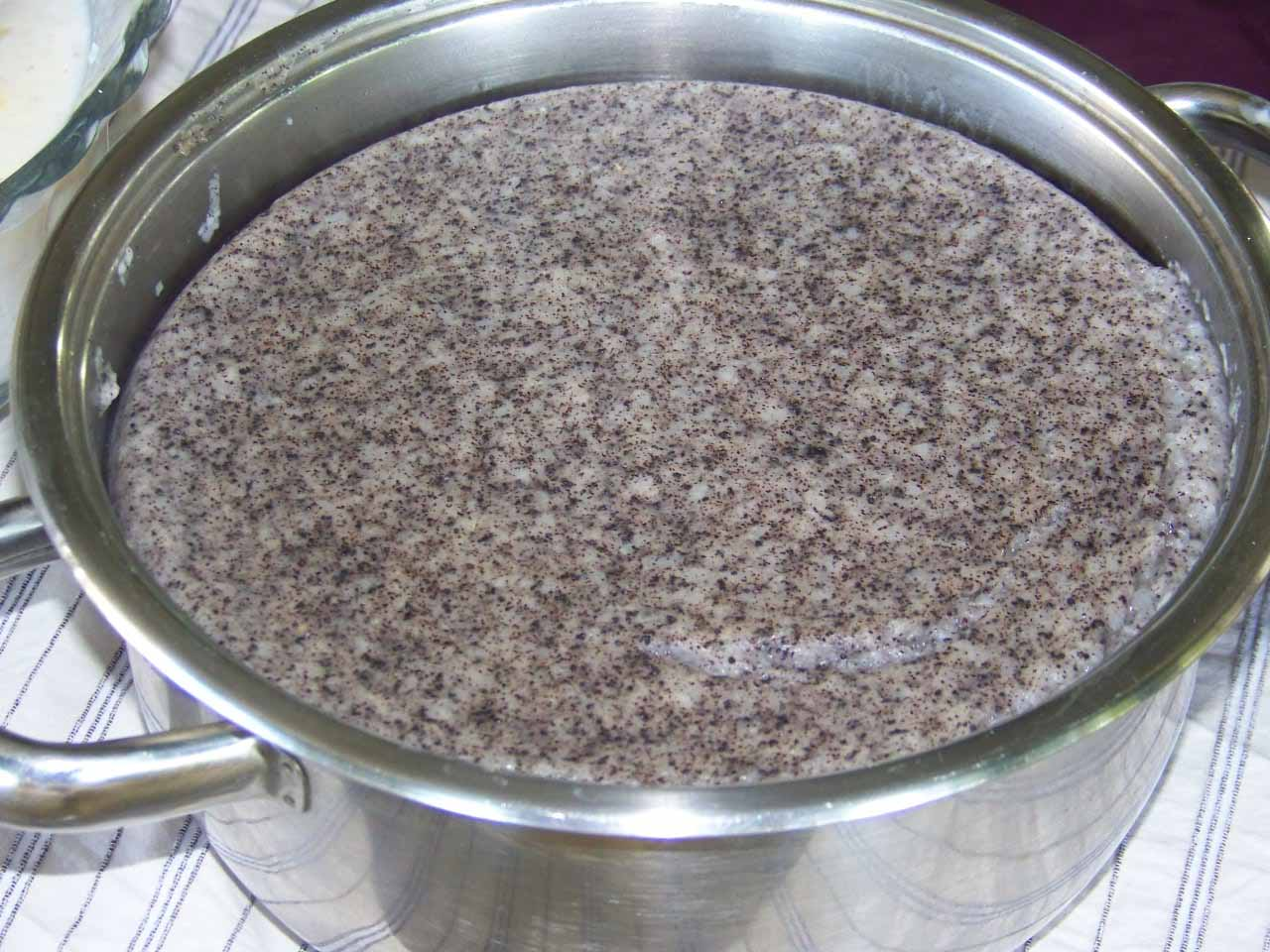
- Lapa prepared with poppy seeds.
- Type: Porridge
- Associated cuisine: Greece, Armenia
- Serving temperature: Hot
- Main ingredients: Rice

Lapa (Armenian: Լապա) or lapas (Greek: λαπάς) is a kind of rice porridge or gruel eaten in the Balkans, Levant, and Middle East. It is made of just rice, water, and salt and has the consistency of a thick soup.

In Greece, it had historically been used in the past as a remedy for stomach illness.

== Etymology ==
The dictionary of the Türk Dil Kurumu considers it a loanword from Pontic Greek ("Rumca").

Robert Dankoff gives it an Armenian origin: լափ lap’ 'watery food for dogs, pap for babies'.

== See also ==
- List of porridges
