= C30H48O6 =

The molecular formula C_{30}H_{48}O_{6} (molar mass: 504.708 g/mol) may refer to:

- Anicequol
- Madecassic acid
