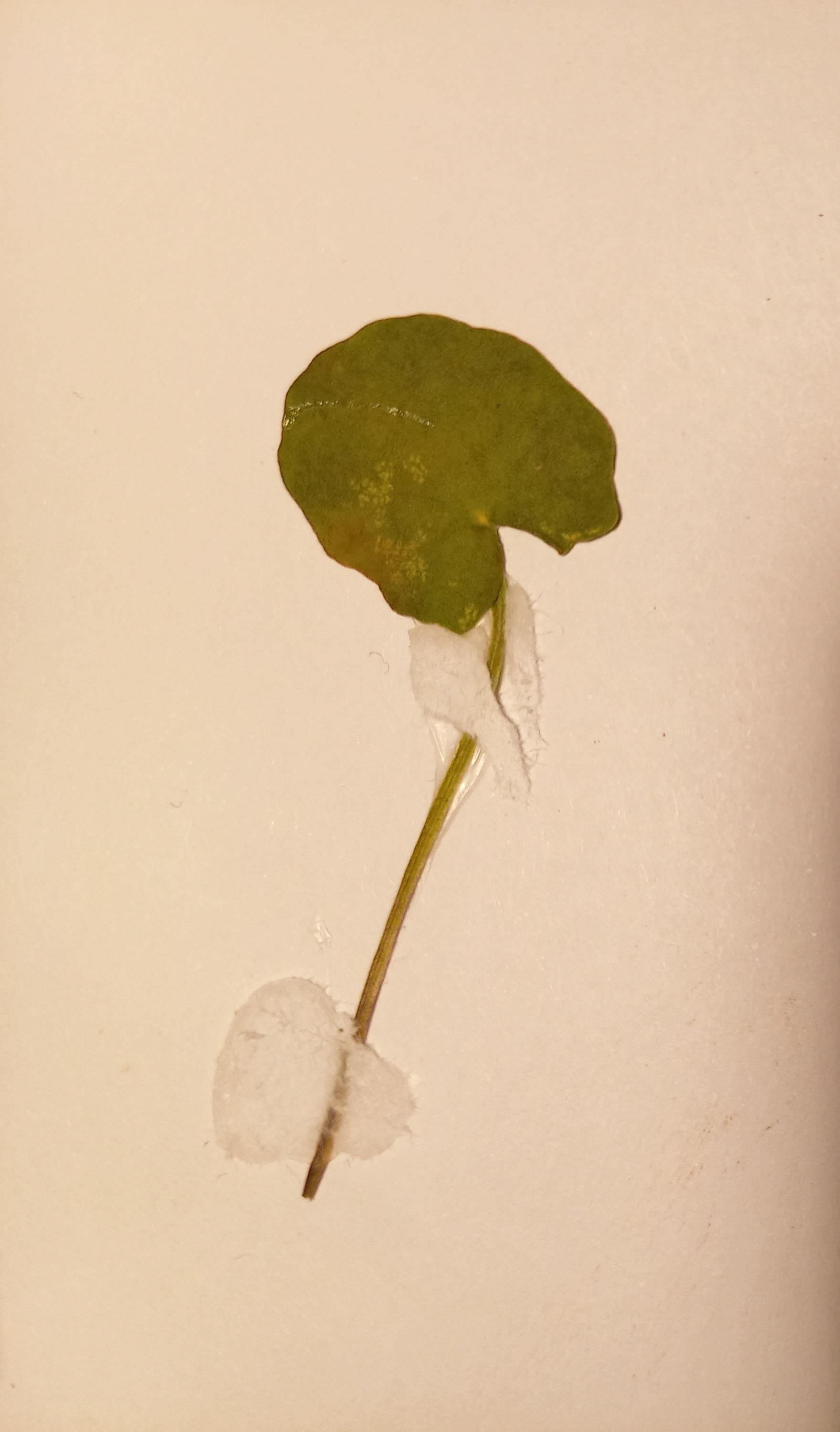
- Pressing of C. cordifolia

Scientific classification
- Kingdom: Plantae
- Clade: Tracheophytes
- Clade: Angiosperms
- Clade: Eudicots
- Clade: Asterids
- Order: Apiales
- Family: Apiaceae
- Genus: Centella
- Species: C. cordifolia

Binomial name
- Centella cordifolia (Hook.f.) Nannf.

Synonyms
- Hydrocotyle cordifolia Hook.f.

= Centella cordifolia =

Species of herb

Centella cordifolia, commonly known as swamp pennywort or arthritis herb, is a trailing perennial herb native to Australia. The species is common in preferred local environments. It potentially has medicinal purposes and indigenous cultural significance. C. cordifolia can be sourced commercially at Australian plant nurseries.

== Description ==
Centella cordifolia is a groundcover herb that can grow up to 15 cm (5.9 in) tall, and typically stretches 1–2 m (3 ft 3 in – 6 ft 7 in) wide.

Leaves are heart-shaped (cordate), glabrescent, glossy and dark green. The lamina is 1–3 cm (0.39–1.18 in) in length (with a similarly sized width), with five to seven veins and scarious margins. When exposed directly to the sun, the leaves sit lowered, towards the ground, whereas in the shade they will stand upright. The petiole has a purple tint, sheathing and broad at the base, and can be up to five times the length of the lamina.

Flowers occur in subsessile umbels in an ovate shape, 3 mm (0.12 in) in length and each containing two to three florets. Petals are purple or white, ovate, and approximately 1.5 mm (0.059 in) in length. Sepals form a very small, lobed ring, and at the base are two involucral bracts. Anthers are dark purple. Flowering times for C. cordifolia occur between late summer (December) to early autumn (March).

Fruit is small, rounded, laterally compressed and contains seeds. five longitudinal ribs span the mericarp, which is 2.5–3 mm (0.098–0.118 in) in length and 4–5 mm (0.16–0.20 in) in width. Small hairs towards the apex can be present, but in general the fruit is glabrous.

Distinguishing C. cordifolia from other Centella species can be difficult, particularly from C. asiatica, which also inhabits parts of Australia. The leaf margins of C. cordifolia are more serrate, whereas C. asiatica have more dentate margins. C. cordifolia also has mat-like growth habit, which can be distinguished from other Centella species that have greater vertical and spreading growth habits.

== Distribution and habitat ==
Centella cordifolia is native to Australia, growing in parts of Western Australia, South Australia, New South Wales, Victoria and Tasmania. However, the species has limited records and distribution lacks an extensive understanding.

The herb grows in damp, poorly drained environments, including marshy soils or shallow waters. Sun exposure can range from full to partial shade. It is intolerant to phosphorus and moderately frost tolerant.

== Ecological processes ==
Centella cordifolia forms part of the understory in the various damp environments it inhabits. It can provide a habitat for frogs. Its root system stabilizes the damp soils it can grow in, preventing erosion.

== Medicinal and cultural significance ==
Centella cordifolia is known to treat rheumatism and arthritis, though widespread adoption and evidence for this is limited. The herb is said to have an indigenous cultural significance, again with limited information available.

C. cordifolia is closely related to Centella asiatica and their uses may be interchangeable. C. asiatica is widespread across Australia, Africa, Asia, North and South America, with well-known cultural, medicinal and culinary uses. In a 2017 study published by Frontiers in Plant Science. C. cordifolia was found to be genetically and chemically similar to C. asiatica, when comparing three Centella species (C. cordifolia, C. asiatica and C. erecta).
