= Kayu ura =

Shinto divination ritual

Kayu ura (粥占) or Mi kayu ura (神粥占) is a Japanese Shinto divination ritual using rice gruel or bean gruel.

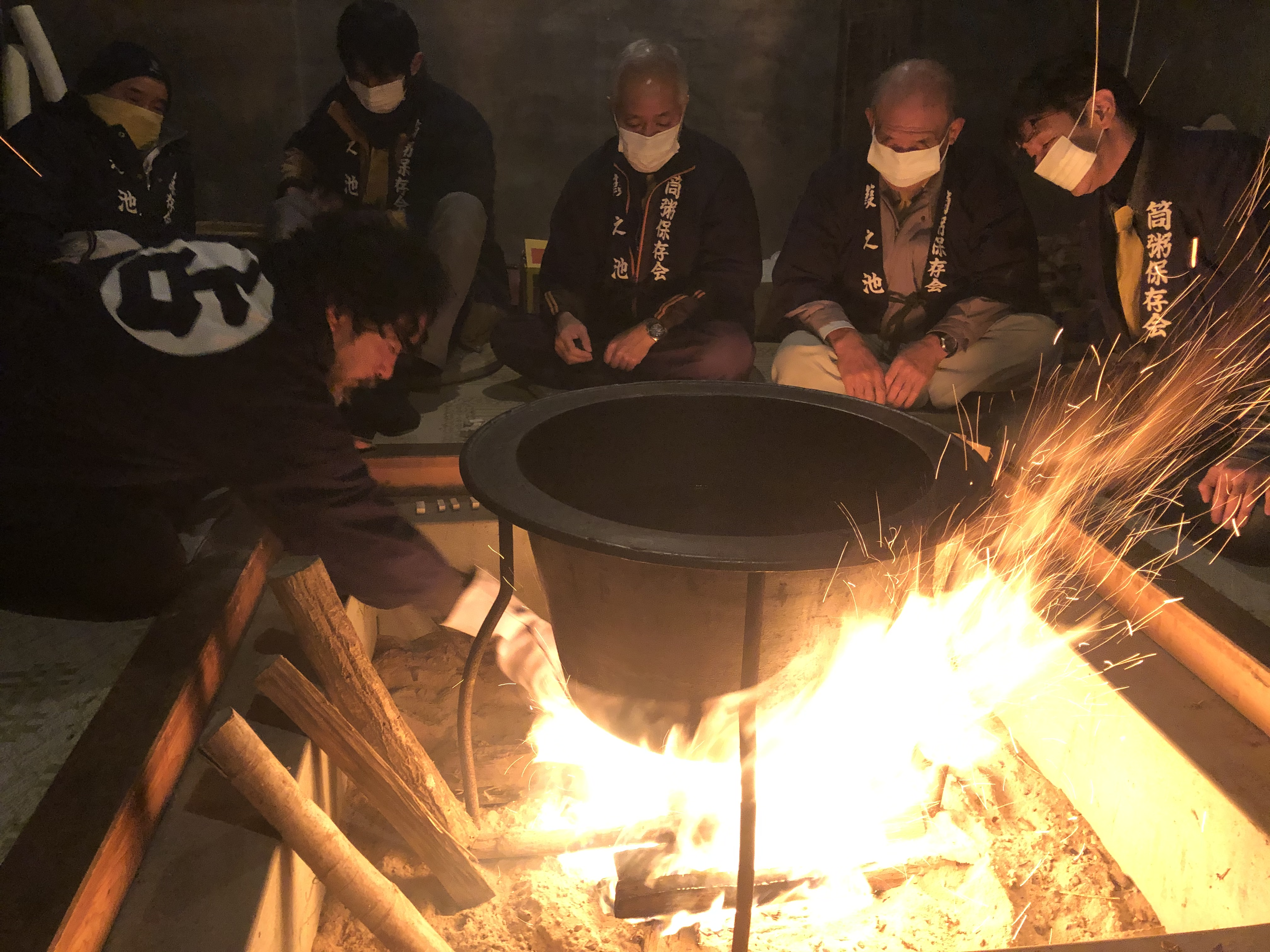
Kayu ura ritual at Fujisan Simomiya Omuro Sengen Shrine

Traditionally, the kayu ura ritual took place on the 15th day of the first lunar month, but, since the adoption of the Gregorian calendar it has been conventional to perform the ceremony on January 15. This date is known as ko-shōgatsu or "Little New Year". Divination by gruel is generally used for predictions about the weather and harvests for the coming year.

The ceremony takes various forms. A common practice is to stir a large pot of rice gruel (粥 (kayu)) with a split wooden stick, and to observe the number and organisation of the grains that adhere to the stick when it is removed. In another variation, known as tsutsugayu shinji and practiced at the Suwa Grand Shrine , multiple hollow cylinders made of split bamboo or reeds are placed in the gruel, each cylinder corresponding to a specific month. Shinto prayers are chanted and the rice porridge is then left overnight. The following morning, the cylinders are cut open and the contents examined – the more rice that has stuck to the inside of the tube, the more propitious the harvest. If multiple tubes are used, these usually correspond to specific months of the year, and the results are recorded on a month-by-month basis. A further variation on the ritual is used in Akita, in which the gruel is not stirred but is instead smeared on a wooden pole; predictions are made based on how much rice sticks to the pole and the patterns that it makes.

The oldest form of this ceremony, and the precursor to the other forms, involves a Shinto priest examining the mold that has formed on a bowl of rice porridge that has been stored in a special box for several days.

Whilst rice is usually used, a porridge made from red beans (a symbol of fertility) can be substituted as an alternative.
