= Kola kanda =

Traditional herbal congee or gruel

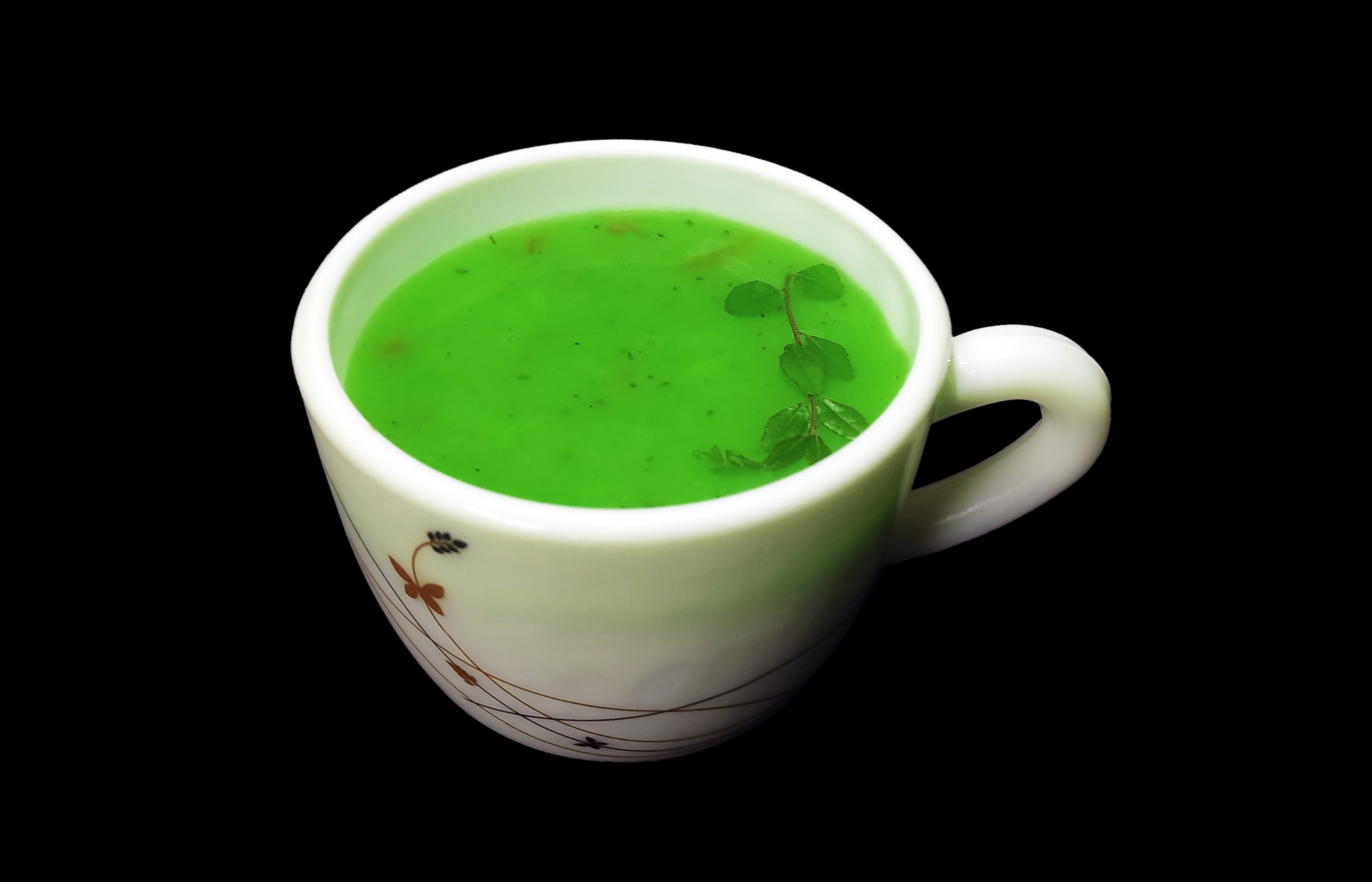
- A cup of Kola kanda
- Alternative names: Kola kandha, kola kenda, kola kanjee, vallarai kanji or karuveppilai Kanji
- Type: Congee
- Course: Breakfast
- Region or state: Sri Lanka
- Created by: Traditional
- Serving temperature: Hot
- Main ingredients: Gotukola, red rice or brown rice, grated coconut or coconut milk, ginger, garlic and salt
- Variations: Lemon juice and palm sugar

Kola kanda (also known as kola kandha or kola kenda) (Sinhala: කොළ කැඳ) is a traditional Sri Lankan herbal congee or gruel, made from raw rice, coconut milk and the fresh juice of medicinally valued leafy greens. The leaves may include gotukola, karapincha (curry leaves), welpenela, iramusu, hatawariya, polpala, or ranawara, depending upon the type of ailment that is being sought to prevent or cure. It is usually served at breakfast, steaming hot, with a piece of jaggery (palm sugar) to counter the bitterness of the herbal leaves.

According to ancient texts, including the Dīpavaṃsa and Mahāvaṃsa, the habit of consuming kola kanda originated with the Buddhist culture. It is eaten by Buddhist monks in the morning, as a means of sustenance. As part of the Buddhist monastic code, monks are only permitted two meals a day (breakfast and lunch) and following a period of not consuming any solid food since lunch the previous day kola kanda provides the monks with the necessary restoration and rejuvenation to commence their daily activities.

== Ingredients ==
The oldest recorded recipe for kola kanda mentions the following ingredients and their amounts

- Red rice - one fistful per person
- gotukola - roughly chopped - one fistful
- Grated coconut - one fistful
- Water
- Ginger - one to two slices - finely chopped
- Garlic - six cloves - finely chopped
- Salt - as required for taste

== Preparation ==
The red rice is ground on a grindstone until broken into smaller pieces, the selected herb is also ground in a similar manner until the juice is extracted. Approximately three cups of water are added to the broken rice grains and boiled, then milk obtained from the grated coconut and garlic is added. The mixture is stirred until the rice becomes soft. The herbal extract is added last with salt and removed from the heat to avoid destroying the nutrients from the herbs.
