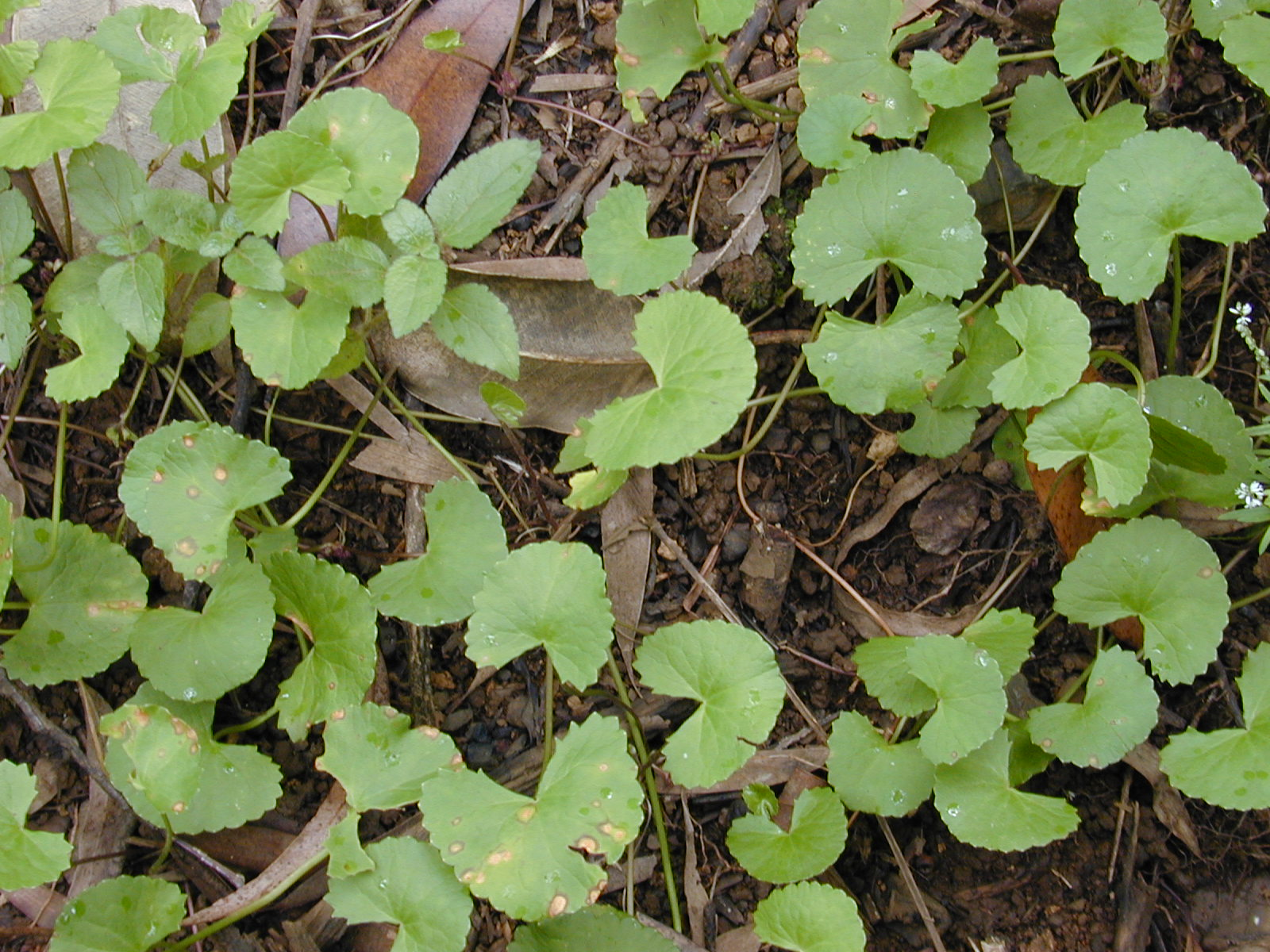

Scientific classification
- Kingdom: Plantae
- Clade: Tracheophytes
- Clade: Angiosperms
- Clade: Eudicots
- Clade: Asterids
- Order: Apiales
- Family: Apiaceae
- Subfamily: Mackinlayoideae
- Genus: Centella; L.

Species
- See text.

Synonyms
- Trisanthus Lour.

= Centella =

Genus of flowering plants

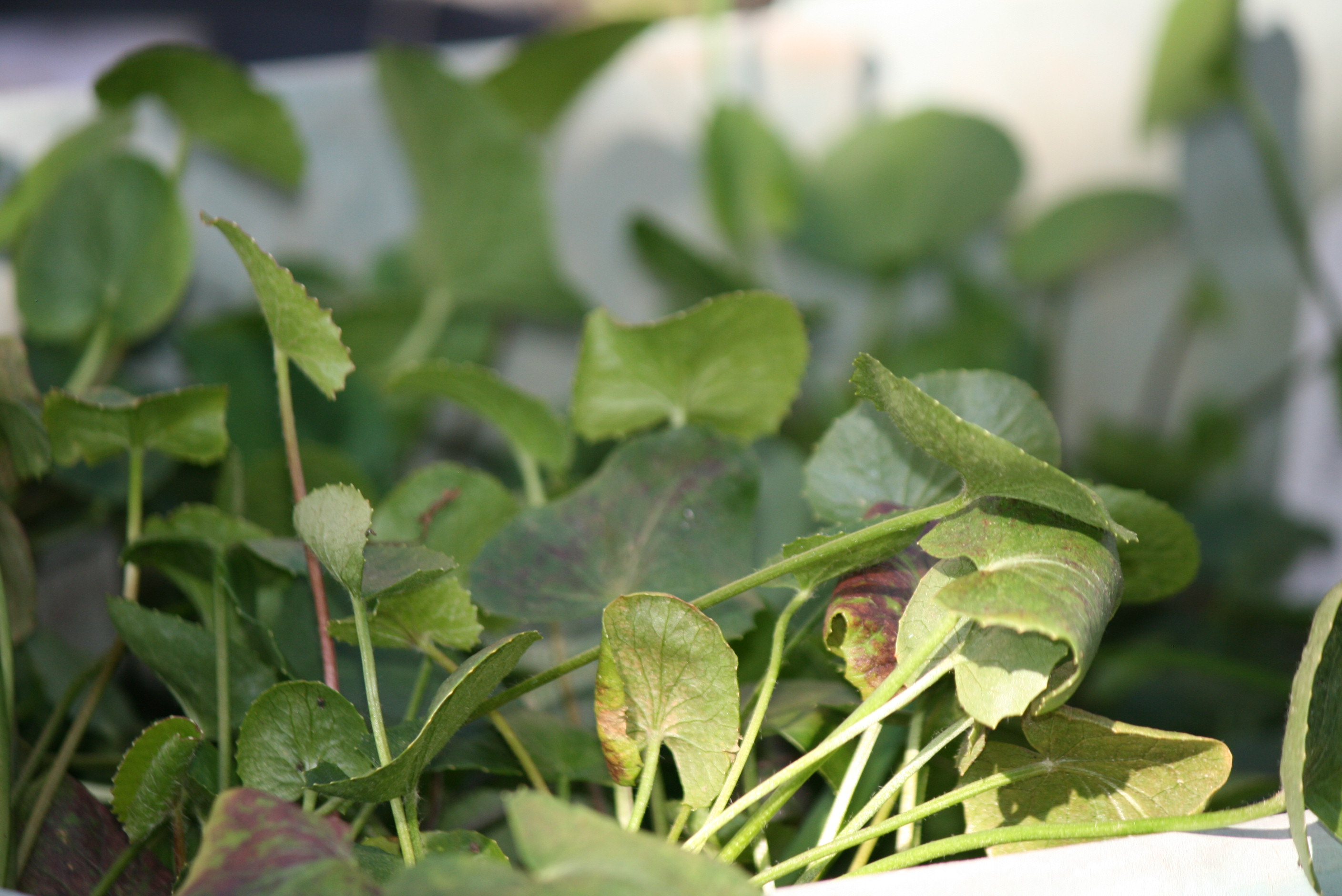
Habit of Centella erecta

Centella is a genus of 53 species of flowering plants in the subfamily Mackinlayoideae. The genus is sometimes placed in family Araliaceae; however, recent studies utilising molecular data place Centella within Apiaceae.

== Species ==
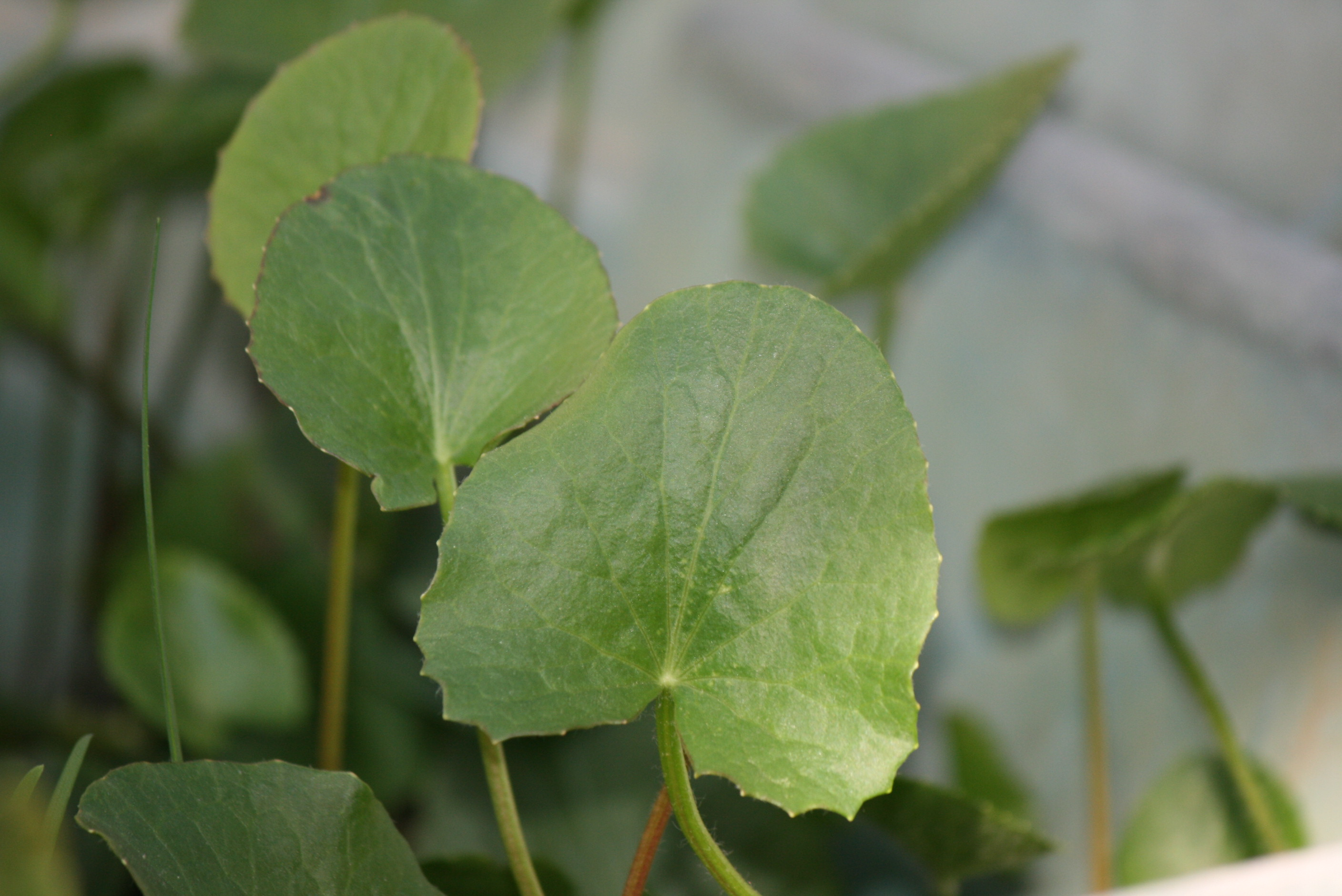
Leaves of Centella erecta

- Centella abbreviata (A. Rich.) Nannf.
- Centella affinis (Eckl. & Zeyh.) Adamson
- Centella annua M.Schub. & B.-E.van Wyk
- Centella asiatica (L.) Urb.
- Centella brachycarpa M.Schub. & B.-E.van Wyk
- Centella caespitosa Adamson
- Centella calcaria M.Schub. & B.-E.van Wyk
- Centella callioda (Cham. & Schltdl.) Drude
- Centella capensis (L.) Domin
- Centella cochlearia (Domin) Adamson
- Centella comptonii Adamson
- Centella cordifolia (Hook.f.) Nannf.
- Centella coriacea Nannf.
- Centella cryptocarpa M.T.R.Schub. & B.-E.van Wyk
- Centella debilis (Eckl. & Zeyh.) Drude
- Centella dentata Adamson
- Centella didymocarpa Adamson
- Centella difformis (Eckl. & Zeyh.) Adamson
- Centella dolichocarpa M.Schub. & B.-E.van Wyk
- Centella erecta (L.f.) Fernald
- Centella eriantha (A.Rich.) Drude
- Centella flexuosa (Eckl. & Zeyh.) Drude
- Centella fourcadei Adamson
- Centella fusca (Eckl. & Zeyh.) Adamson
- Centella glabrata L.
- Centella glauca M.Schub. & B.-E.van Wyk
- Centella graminifolia Adamson
- Centella gymnocarpa M.T.R.Schub. & B.-E.van Wyk
- Centella laevis Adamson
- Centella lanata Compton
- Centella lasiophylla Adamson
- Centella linifolia (L.f.) Drude
  - Centella linifolia var. depressa Adamson
- Centella longifolia (Adamson) M.T.R.Schub. & B.-E.van Wyk
- Centella macrocarpa (A.Rich.) Adamson
- Centella macrodus (Spreng.) B.L.Burtt
- Centella montana (Cham. & Schltdl.) Domin
- Centella obtriangularis Cannon
- Centella pilosa M.Schub. & B.-E.van Wyk
- Centella pottebergensis Adamson
- Centella recticarpa Adamson
- Centella restioides Adamson
- Centella rupestris (Eckl. & Zeyh.) Adamson
- Centella scabra Adamson
- Centella sessilis Adamson
- Centella stenophylla Adamson
- Centella stipitata Adamson
- Centella ternata M.Schub. & B.-E.van Wyk
- Centella thesioides M.Schub. & B.-E.van Wyk
- Centella tridentata (L.f.) Drude ex Domin
  - Centella tridentata var. dregeana (Sond.) M.Schub. & B.-E.van Wyk
  - Centella tridentata var. hermaniifolia (Eckl. & Zeyh.) M.Schub. & B.-E.van Wyk
  - Centella tridentata var. litoralis (Eckl. & Zeyh.) M.Schub. & B.-E.van Wyk
- Centella triloba (Thunb.) Drude
- Centella umbellata M.Schub. & B.-E.van Wyk
- Centella villosa L.
  - Centella villosa var. latifolia (Eckl. & Zeyh.) Adamson
- Centella virgata (L.f.) Drude
