= Madecassoside =

Names
- Other names Redermic, Asiaticoside A

Identifiers
CAS Number	34540-22-2
3D model (JSmol)	Interactive image
ChEBI	CHEBI:66651
ChEMBL	ChEMBL4787233
ChemSpider	28639016
DrugBank	DB15532
ECHA InfoCard	100.047.327
EC Number	252-076-1
PubChem CID	24825675
UNII	CQ2F5O6YIY
CompTox Dashboard (EPA)	DTXSID40956057
- InChI: InChI=1S/C48H78O20/c1-19-10-11-48(13-12-46(6)22(28(48)20(19)2)8-9-27-44(4)14-24(52)39(61)45(5,18-50)38(44)23(51)15-47(27,46)7)43(62)68-42-35(59)32(56)30(54)26(66-42)17-63-40-36(60)33(57)37(25(16-49)65-40)67-41-34(58)31(55)29(53)21(3)64-41/h8,19-21,23-42,49-61H,9-18H2,1-7H3 Key: BNMGUJRJUUDLHW-HCZMHFOYSA-N
- SMILES: CC1CCC2(CCC3(C)C(=CCC4C5(C)CC(O)C(O)C(C)(CO)C5C(O)CC34C)C2C1C)C(=O)OC1OC(COC2OC(CO)C(OC3OC(C)C(O)C(O)C3O)C(O)C2O)C(O)C(O)C1O

Properties
Chemical formula	C_{48}H_{78}O_{20}
Molar mass	975.132 g·mol^{−1}
Appearance	white crystals
Density	1.47 g/cm^{3}
Melting point	220–223 °C (428–433 °F; 493–496 K)
Boiling point	1,043.55 °C (1,910.39 °F; 1,316.70 K)
Solubility in water	soluble
- Except where otherwise noted, data are given for materials in their standard state (at 25 °C [77 °F], 100 kPa). Infobox references

Madecassoside is a pentacyclic triterpenoid extracted from the plant Centella asiatica.

== Uses ==
Scientific studies have confirmed the anti-inflammatory activity of this substance, already known in traditional medicine through the use of the plant from which it is extracted.

== See also ==
- Madecassic acid
