= Madecassic acid =

Names
- IUPAC name (1S,2R,4aS,6aR,6aS,6bR,8R,8aR,9R,10R,11R,12aR,14bS)-8,10,11-trihydroxy-9-(hydroxymethyl)-1,2,6a,6b,9,12a-hexamethyl-2,3,4,5,6,6a,7,8,8a,10,11,12,13,14b-tetradecahydro-1H-picene-4a-carboxylic acid
- Other names Brahmic acid

Identifiers
CAS Number	18449-41-7
3D model (JSmol)	Interactive image
ChEBI	CHEBI:73058
ChEMBL	ChEMBL481854
ChemSpider	66126
DrugBank	DB14037
ECHA InfoCard	100.113.087
EC Number	606-031-1
PubChem CID	73412
UNII	M7O1N24J82
CompTox Dashboard (EPA)	DTXSID70939838
- InChI: InChI=1S/C30H48O6/c1-16-9-10-30(25(35)36)12-11-28(5)18(22(30)17(16)2)7-8-21-26(3)13-20(33)24(34)27(4,15-31)23(26)19(32)14-29(21,28)6/h7,16-17,19-24,31-34H,8-15H2,1-6H3,(H,35,36)/t16-,17+,19-,20-,21-,22+,23-,24+,26-,27+,28-,29-,30+/m1/s1 Key: PRAUVHZJPXOEIF-AOLYGAPISA-N
- SMILES: C[C@@H]1CC[C@@]2(CC[C@@]3(C(=CC[C@H]4[C@]3(C[C@H]([C@@H]5[C@@]4(C[C@H]([C@@H]([C@@]5(C)CO)O)O)C)O)C)[C@@H]2[C@H]1C)C)C(=O)O

Properties
Chemical formula	C_{30}H_{48}O_{6}
Molar mass	504.708 g·mol^{−1}
- Except where otherwise noted, data are given for materials in their standard state (at 25 °C [77 °F], 100 kPa). (what is ?) Infobox references

Madecassic acid is a pentacyclic triterpenoid compound that occurs naturally in several plant species. Madecassic acid is a member of the ursane-type triterpenoids and is structurally similar to Asiatic acid, differing by the presence of a hydroxyl group at the C-2 position.

== Natural occurrence ==
The acid is found in Centella asiatica (Gotu Kola). Other sources include Centella cordifolia and Hydrocotyle umbellata. The compound is closely related to Asiatic acid and is known for its various pharmacological properties, including anti-inflammatory, wound-healing, anti-oxidant, and neuroprotective effects. It is often studied alongside other bioactive compounds from Centella asiatica.

== Uses ==
Madecassic acid is used in both traditional and modern medicine, particularly in dermatology and wound care. As a triterpene, madecassic acid also exhibits notable antioxidant benefits, assisting in protecting skin from the pro-aging damage that environmental aggressors, like UV rays and pollution, can cause.

== See also ==
- Madecassoside
