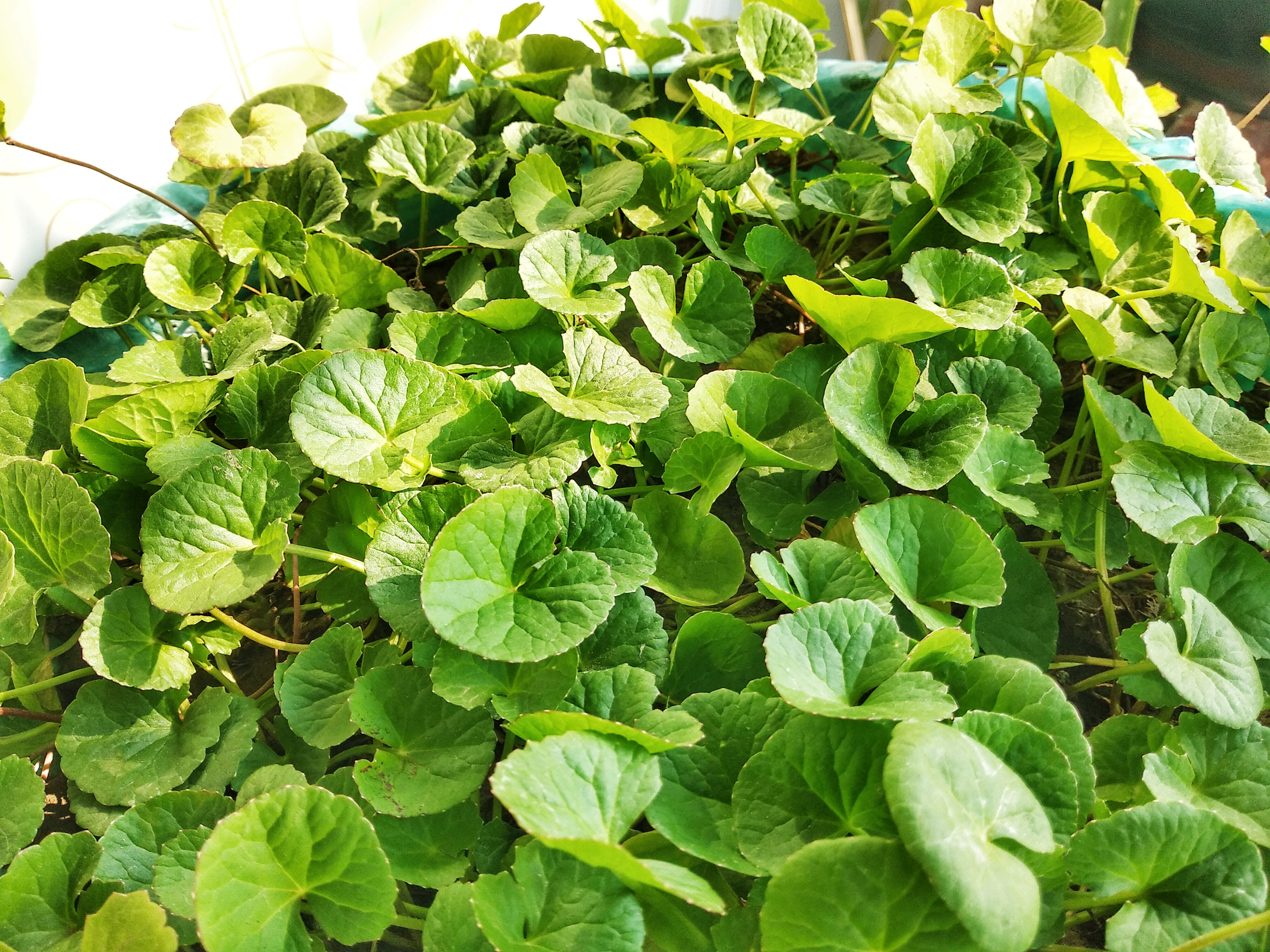

Conservation status
- Least Concern (IUCN 3.1)

Scientific classification
- Kingdom: Plantae
- Clade: Tracheophytes
- Clade: Angiosperms
- Clade: Eudicots
- Clade: Asterids
- Order: Apiales
- Family: Apiaceae
- Genus: Centella
- Species: C. asiatica

Binomial name
- Centella asiatica (L.) Urban

Synonyms
- Hydrocotyle asiatica L. Trisanthus cochinchinensis Lour.

= Centella asiatica =

Species of flowering plant

Centella asiatica, commonly known as Indian pennywort, Asiatic pennywort, spadeleaf, coinwort or gotu kola, is a herbaceous, perennial plant in the flowering plant family Apiaceae. It is native to tropical regions of Africa, Asia, Australia, and islands in the western Pacific Ocean. It is consumed as a culinary vegetable and is used in traditional medicine.

== Description ==
The stems are slender, creeping stolons, green to reddish-green in color, connecting plants to each other. It has long-stalked, green leaves; the leaf blade has a rounded apex, a smooth texture and palmately netted veins; the leaf stalk is broadened at the base into a leaf-sheath. The rootstock consists of rhizomes, growing vertically down. They are cream in color and covered with root hairs.

The flowers are white or crimson in color, born in small, rounded bunches (umbels) near the surface of the soil. Each flower is partly enclosed in two green bracts. The hermaphrodite flowers are minute in size, less than 3 mm (0.12 in), with five to six corolla lobes per flower. Each flower bears five stamens and two styles. The fruit are densely reticulate, distinguishing it from species of Hydrocotyle which have smooth, ribbed or warty fruit. The crop matures in three months, and the whole plant, including the roots, is harvested manually. C. asiatica has numerous common names in its regions of distribution.

Triterpene compounds of Centella asiatica

== Ecology ==
Centella grows in temperate and tropical swampy areas in many regions of the world. C. asiatica is indigenous to the Indian subcontinent (including Sri Lanka), Southeast Asia, parts of Australia, and wetland regions of the Southeastern US. Because the plant is aquatic, it is especially sensitive to biological and chemical pollutants in the water, which may be absorbed into the plant. It can be cultivated in drier soils, including sandy loam, as long as they are watered regularly enough (such as in a home garden arrangement).

It is considered a highly invasive plant in a number of Pacific islands to which it has been introduced, being rated as "high risk" in this context. There is however not much data on what problems it is actually causing. It is noted as a contributor to the decline of Hawaiian sedge species Carex thunbergii and Carex echinata. It is considered invasive in: Chagos Archipelago, Seychelles, Hawaii, Lord Howe Island, French Polynesia, Marshall Islands, Niue, Norfolk Island, Solomon Islands, and Wallis and Futuna Islands.

== Phytochemicals ==
Centella asiatica contains pentacyclic triterpenoids and their trisaccharide glycosides. For example it contains asiatic acid and brahmic acid (madecassic acid) along with their corresponding derivatives, asiaticoside and brahmoside (madecassoside). Other constituents include centellose and centelloside. Approximately 124 chemical compounds have been isolated and identified from Centella asiatica.

== Genetics ==
Centella asiatica individuals are diploid, tetraploid, or hexaploid (2n = 18/36/54). A chromosome-level genome was published in 2021. A telomere-to-telomere genome was published in 2025 along with A/B compartments annotation. C. asiatica belongs to an early-branching group under the family Apiaceae. The genomes provide insights into how C. asiatica produces secondary metabolites with alleged functions in traditional medicine.

== Uses ==
=== Culinary ===
In Burmese cuisine, raw pennywort is used as the main constituent in a salad mixed with onions, crushed peanuts, bean powder and seasoned with lime juice and fish sauce.

Centella is used as a leafy green in Sri Lankan cuisine, being the predominantly locally available leafy green, where it is called gotu kola or vallaarai. It is most often prepared as malluma, a traditional accompaniment to rice and vegetarian dishes, such as lentils, and jackfruit or pumpkin curry. It is considered nutritious. In addition to finely chopped gotu kola plants, the gotu kola malluma may be eaten with grated coconut, diced shallots, lime (or lemon) juice, and sea salt. Additional ingredients are finely chopped green chilis, chili powder, turmeric powder, or chopped carrots. The Centella fruit-bearing structures are discarded from the gotu kola malluma due to their intense bitter taste. A variation of porridge known as kola kanda is also made with gotu kola in Sri Lanka. Gotu kola kanda or Vallaarai kanji is made with well-boiled red rice with some extra liquid, coconut milk first extract, and gotu kola purée. The porridge is accompanied with jaggery for sweetness. Centella leaves are also used in modern sweet pennywort drinks and herbal teas. In addition the leaves are served stir-fried whole in coconut oil, or cooked in coconut milk with garlic or dhal.

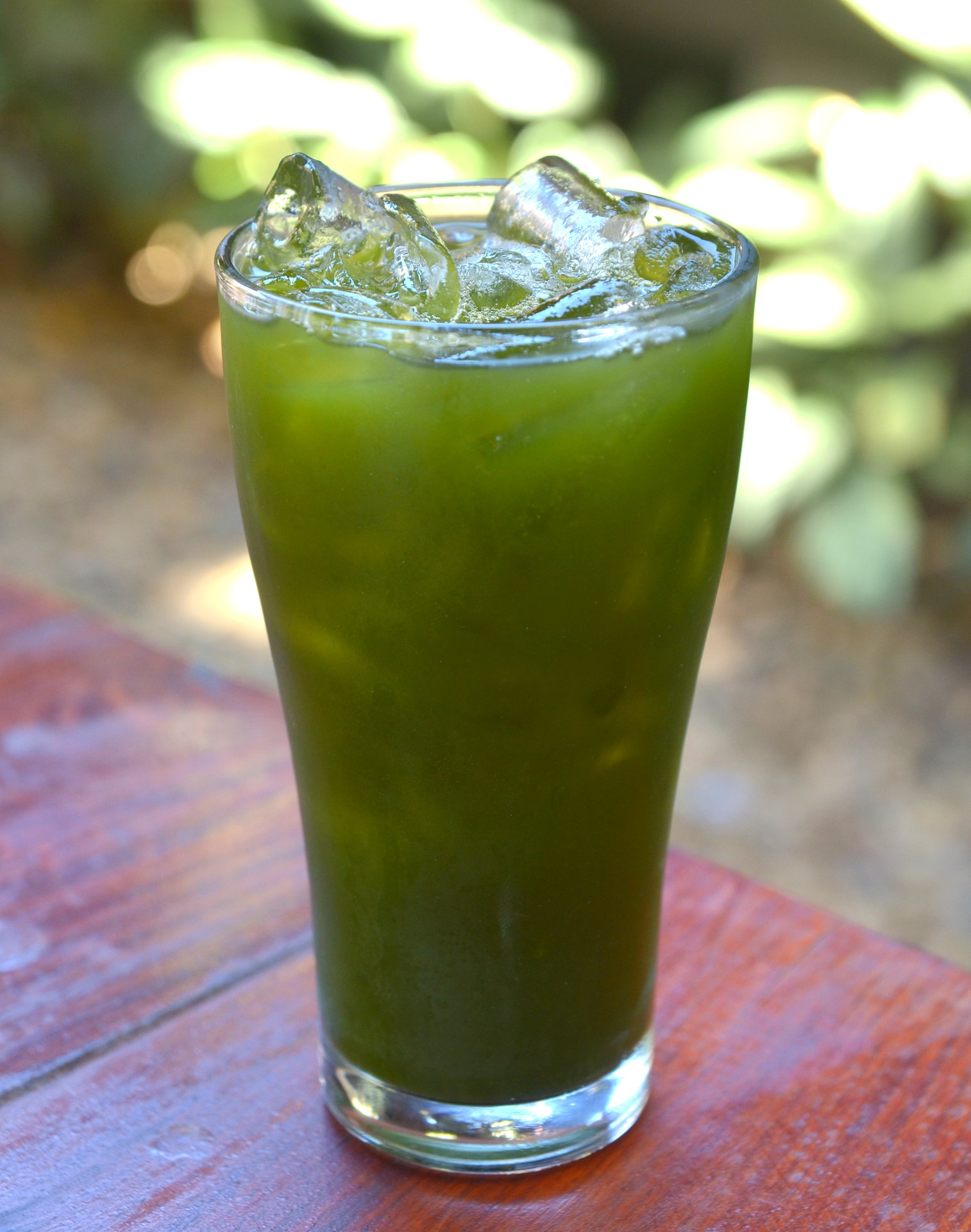
Bai bua bok as a beverage, Thailand

In Indonesia, the leaves are used for sambai oi peuga-ga, an Aceh type of salad, and is also mixed into asinan in Bogor. In Malay cuisine it is known as pegaga, and the leaves of this plant are used for ulam, a type of vegetable salad. C. asiatica is widely used in various Indian regional cuisines. In Cambodia, Vietnam and Thailand, this leaf is used for preparing a drink or can be eaten in raw form in salads or cold rolls. In Bangkok, vendors in the Chatuchak Weekend Market sell it as nam bai-buua-bok (Thai: น้ำใบบัวบก), alongside coconut, roselle, chrysanthemum, orange and other health drinks.

In Bangladesh and India (specifically in West Bengal), Centella is called Thankuni Pata (Bengali: থানকুনি পাতা) and used in various dishes, one of the most appetising of which is the pakora-like snack called Thankuni Patar Bora (Bengali: থানকুনি পাতার বড়া), made of mashed Centella, lentils, julienned onion and green chilli.

=== Traditional medicine ===
In traditional medicine, C. asiatica has been used with the intent to treat various disorders, dermatological conditions, and minor wounds, although clinical efficacy and safety have not been proven in clinical research.

Contact dermatitis and skin irritation can result from topical application. Drowsiness may occur after consuming it.

=== Agricultural use ===
In the context of phytoremediation, C. asiatica is a potential phytoextraction tool owing to its ability to take up and translocate metals from root to shoot when grown in soils contaminated by heavy metals.

== Adverse effects ==
Reviews in 2024 indicated that consuming foods or dietary supplements containing C. asiatica may cause adverse effects, including contact dermatitis, jaundice and liver disease. There have been case reports of liver disease associated with use over multiple weeks.

== Gallery ==
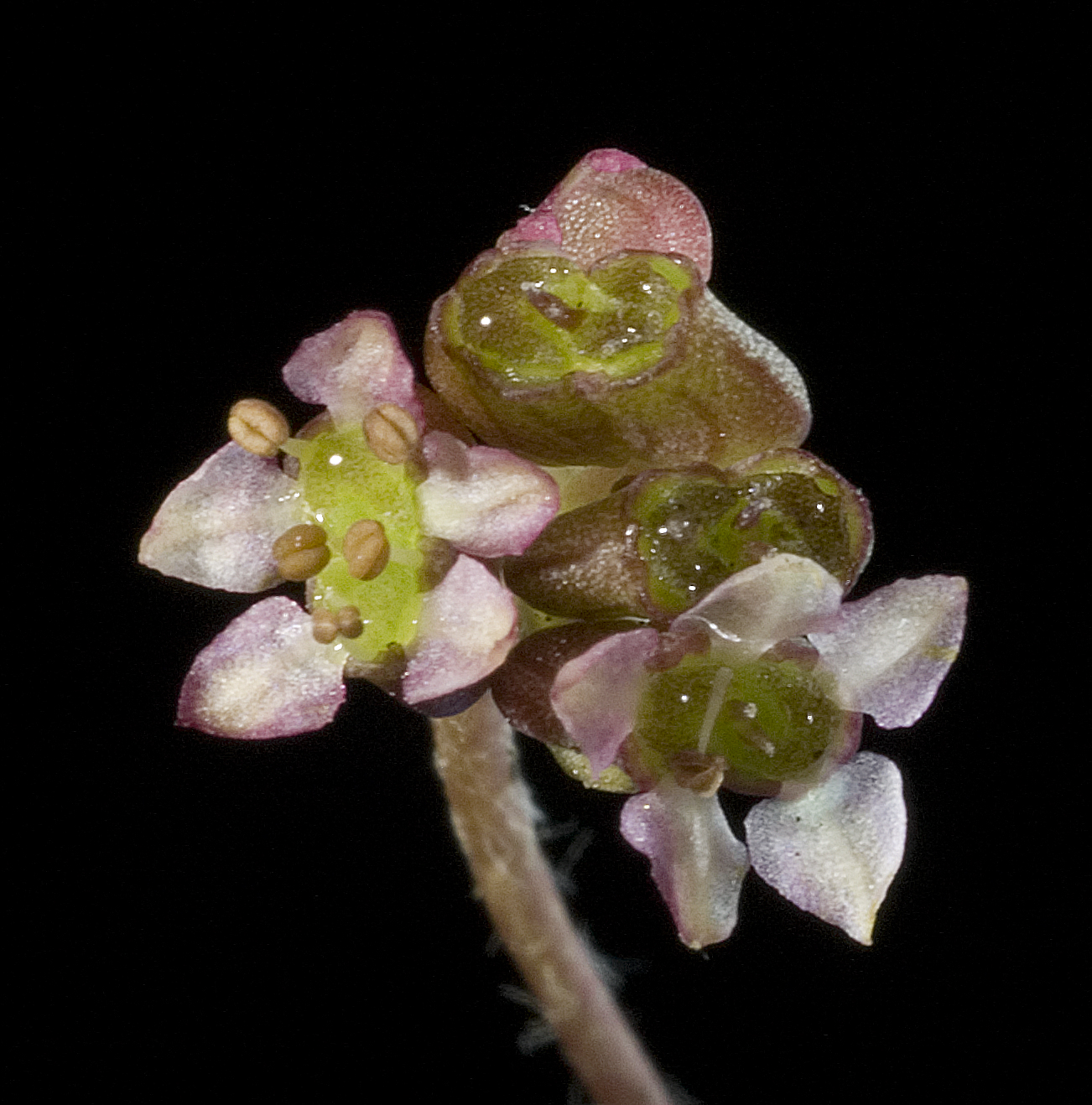
Emerging flowers

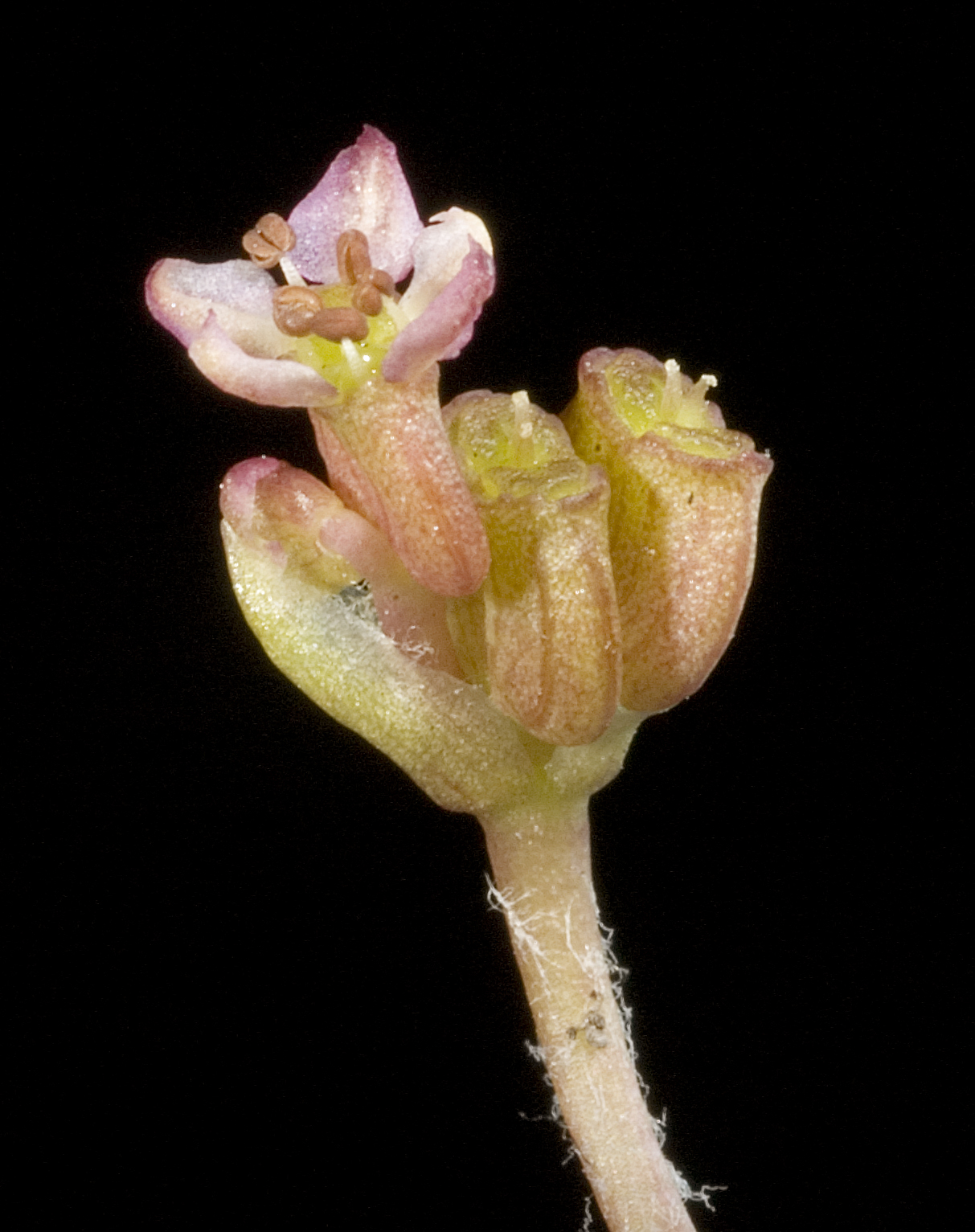
Close-up of flower

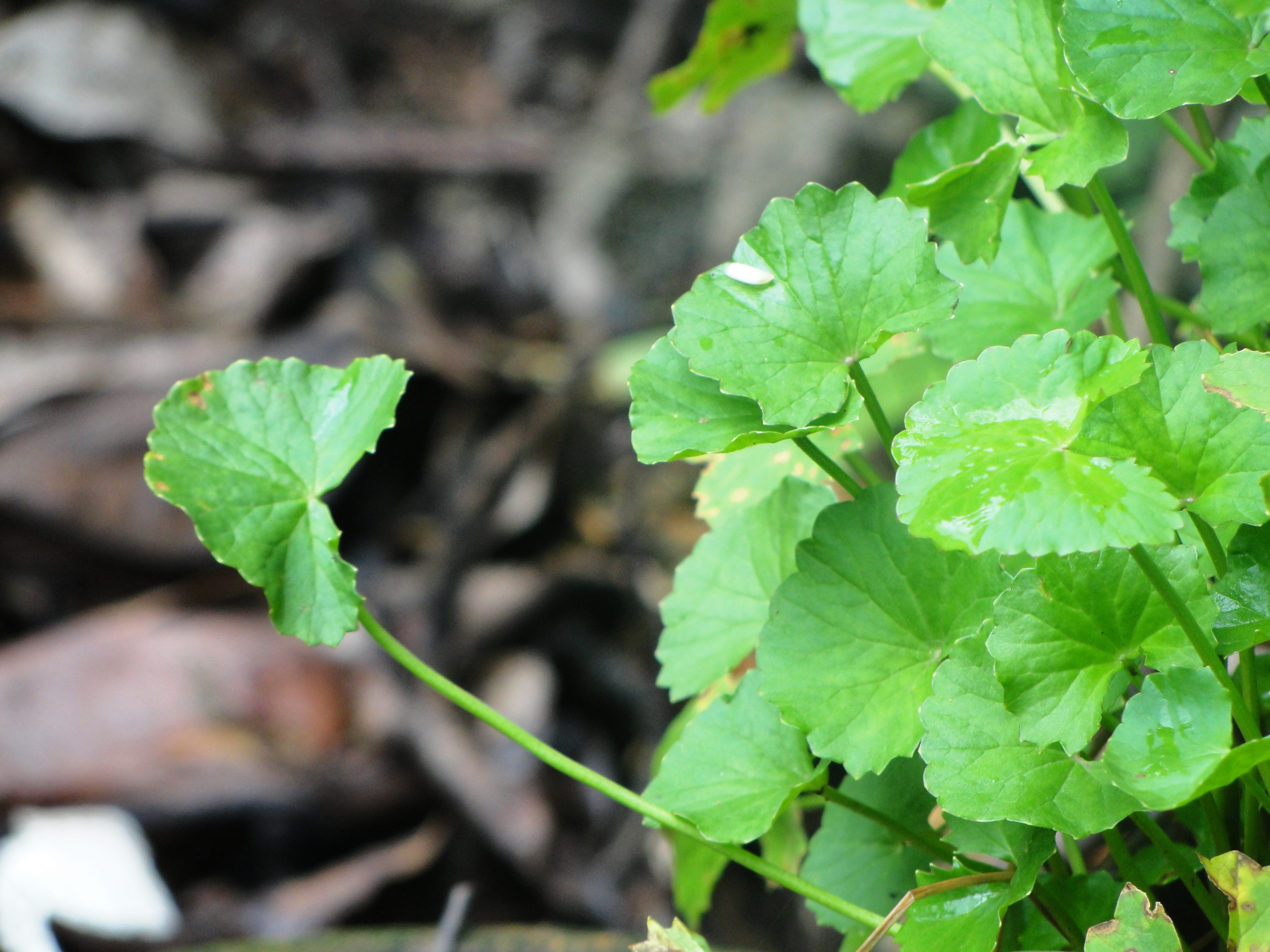
Centella asiatica, India

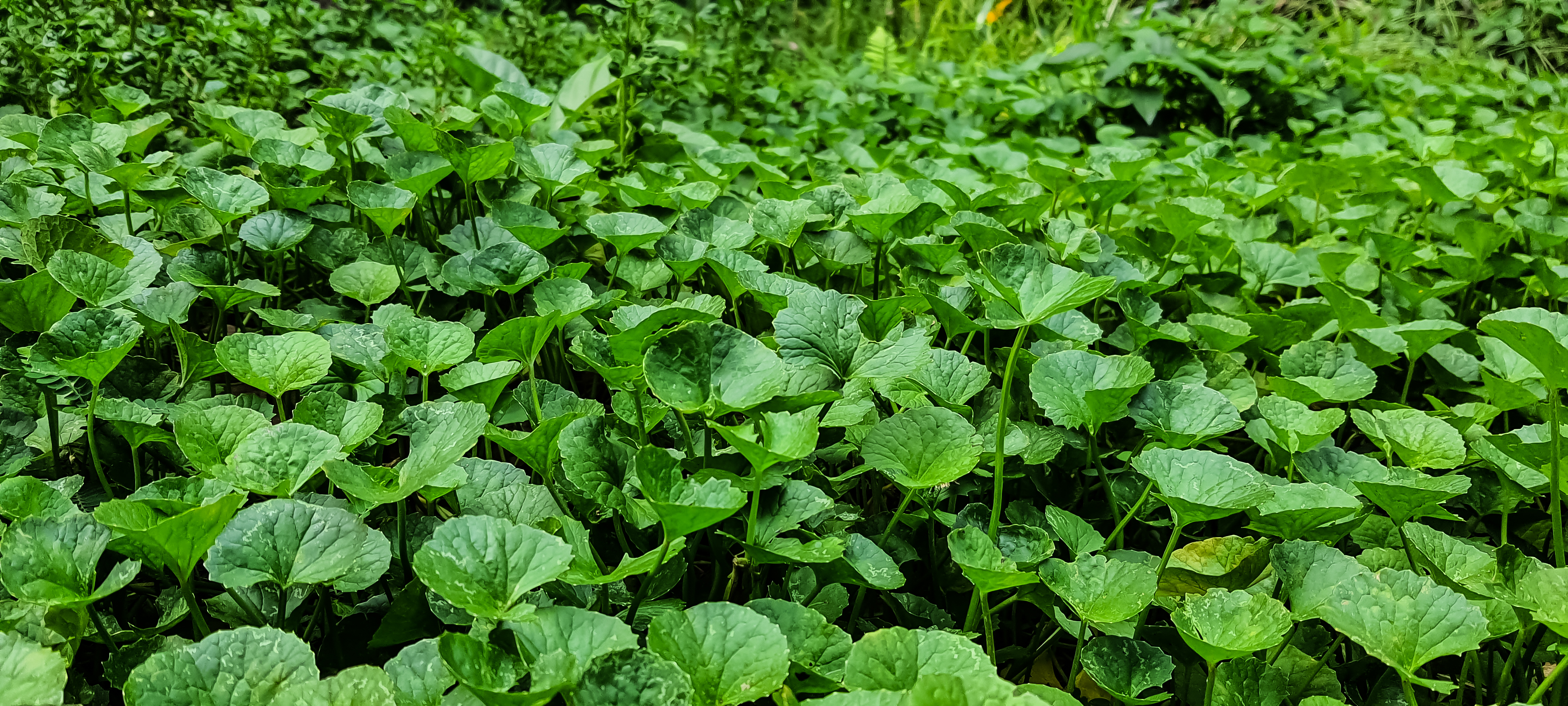
A patch of Centella asiatica or pegaga in Malay
