= Congee =

Asian savoury rice porridge dish

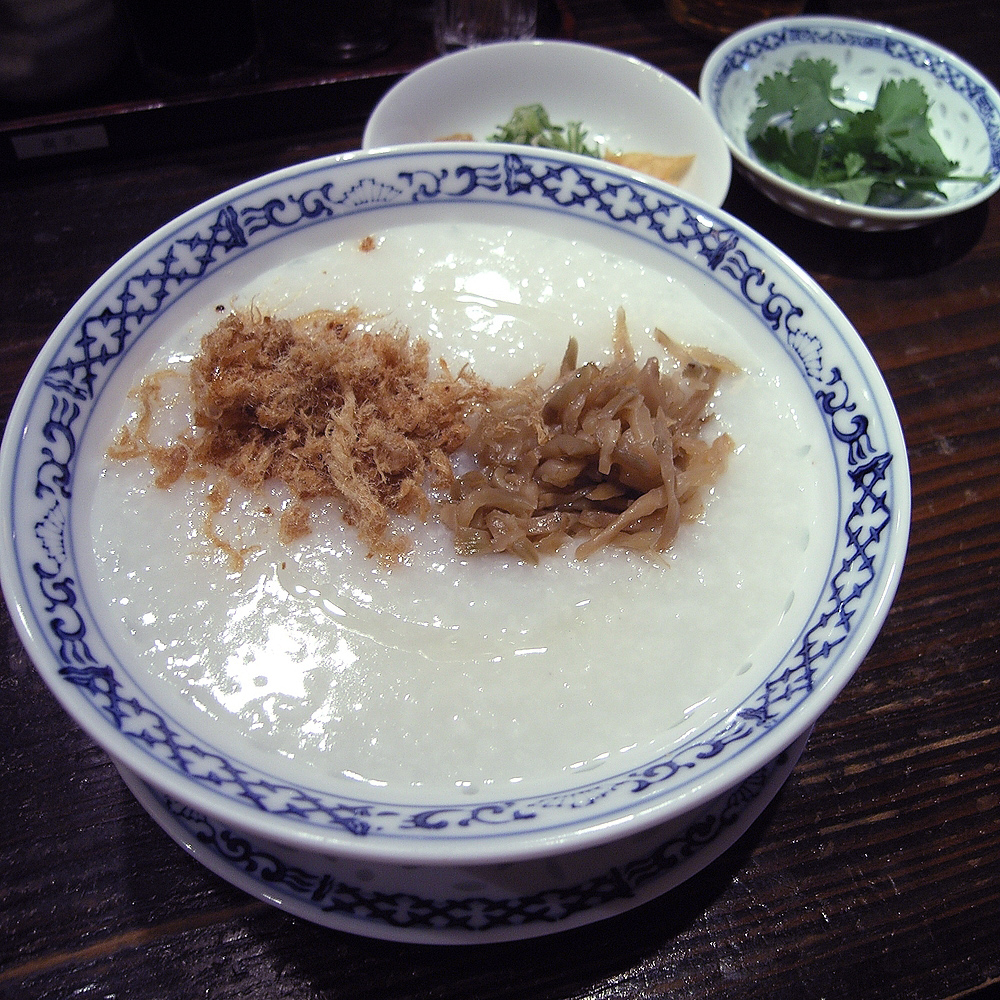
- Chinese zhou (rice congee) with rousong and zha cai (with coriander in side bowl)
- Type: Porridge
- Main ingredients: Rice

Congee (/ˈkɒndʒiː/ KON-jee, derived from Tamil கஞ்சி [kaɲdʑi]) is a form of savoury porridge, primarily made by boiling rice in a large amount of water until it softens or dissolves, and commonly flavored with salt or mild broth. Depending on the rice–water ratio, the thickness of congee varies from a Western oatmeal porridge to a gruel. Congee is typically served with side dishes, or it can be topped with meat, fish, and pickled vegetables.

Vivid experiences of eating or delivering thin congee as wartime or famine food often feature in diaries and chronicles. In some cultures, congee is eaten primarily as a breakfast food or late supper; some may also eat it as a substitute for rice at other meals. It is often considered suitable for the sick as a mild, easily digestible food.

== Etymology ==
The popular English name congee derives from the Tamil word கஞ்சி (kañci). The Portuguese adopted the name as canje, with the first document mentioning the dish and the word in 1563. The English name was adopted from the Portuguese. In China, congee is known as zhou (Chinese: 粥; pinyin: zhōu; Cantonese Yale: jūk), with the first recorded reference traced back to 1000 BC during Zhou dynasty. Across Asia, various similar dishes exist with varying names.

== Varieties ==
=== East Asia ===
==== China ====
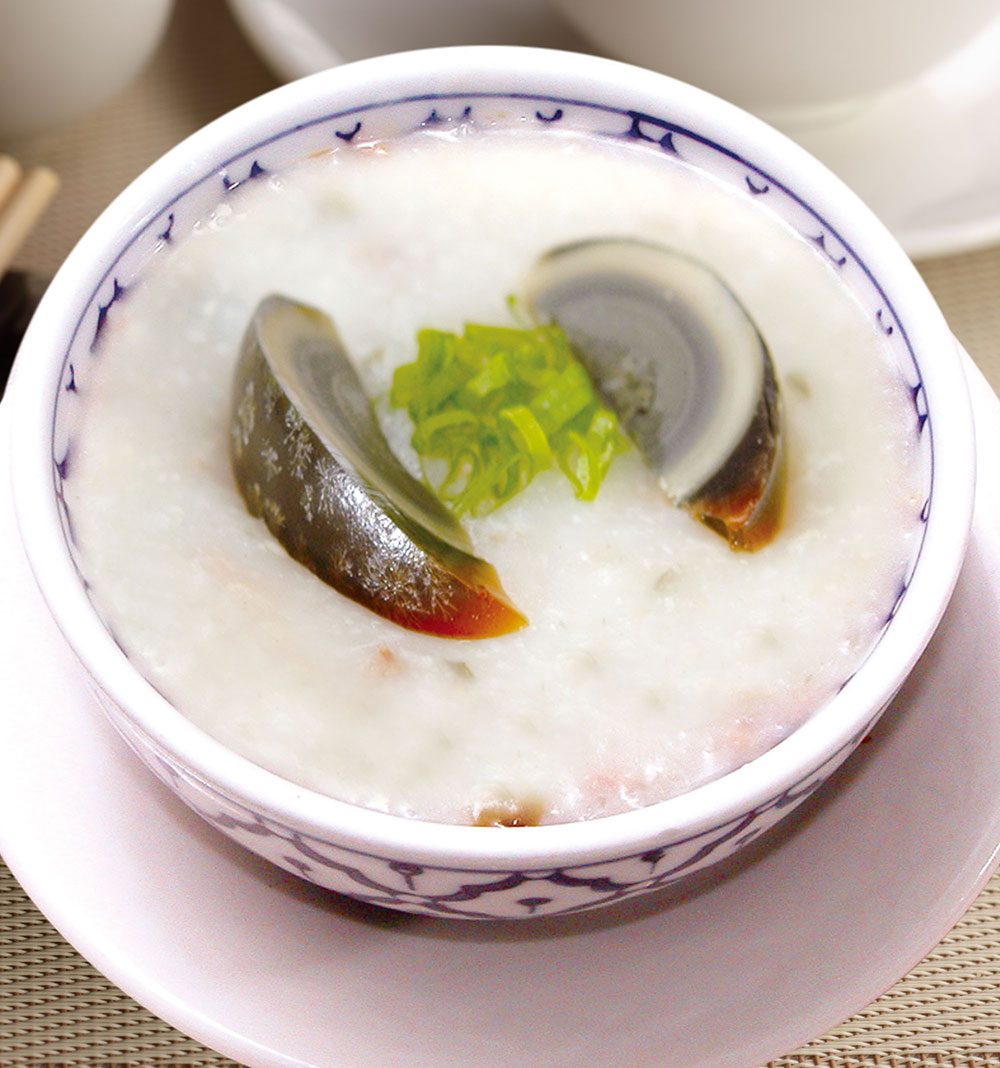
Congee with minced pork and century eggs (pidan shourou zhou)

Porridge or congee (粥; zhōu or 稀飯; xīfàn in Standard Chinese) in southern China usually means rice congee, while in the north it may be cornmeal porridge, proso millet porridge, foxtail millet porridge, or sorghum porridge, reflecting the north–south divide of grain production.

In northwest Shanxi and Inner Mongolia, fermented rice and millet porridge known as suan zhou (酸粥) is popular. Rice and millet are soaked to allow fermentation, then water is drained to obtain porridge. The water is served as a drink, suan mi tang (酸米湯). The porridge is eaten with pickles of turnips, carrots, radish or celery. When stirred-fried, the porridge is called chao suan zhou (炒酸粥). The porridge may also be steamed into solids known as suan lao fan (酸撈飯). While the traditional grain is proso millet, it is mixed with rice when available. Many folk idioms of sourness derive from this dish.

In Shanghai, Suzhou and nearby, an iconic glutinous rice porridge topped by red bean paste, sweet olive syrup and brown sugar is chi dou hu tang zhou (赤豆糊糖粥, Shanghainese: tshaq deu wu daon tsoq). Street hawking of this porridge is featured in a well-known Wu Chinese nursery rhyme.

Originating in Guangdong, century egg congee (皮蛋瘦肉粥; pèihdáan sauyuhk jūk in Cantonese) has become popular nationwide since the 2000s. It was first tested on the menu of KFC in Shanghai in 2002 and later rolled out to all KFCs in mainland China and Taiwan. Century egg porridge ranked in the top ten in breakfast orders in almost every Chinese major city as far north as Harbin.

Additional common regional ingredients include salted duck eggs, rousong, zhacai, pickled tofu, mung beans and organ meats (especially pig liver). Youtiao is served as a side dish in some Chinese cultures. Congee with multiple ingredients tends to be seen as expensive and festive congee, such as Laba congee.

==== Taiwan ====
In Taiwan, congee is known as muê (糜) in Taiwanese Hokkien or xīfàn (稀飯) in Mandarin. Sweet potato, taro root, or century egg is often added for taste. A famous congee dish in Taiwan is milkfish congee.

==== Japan ====
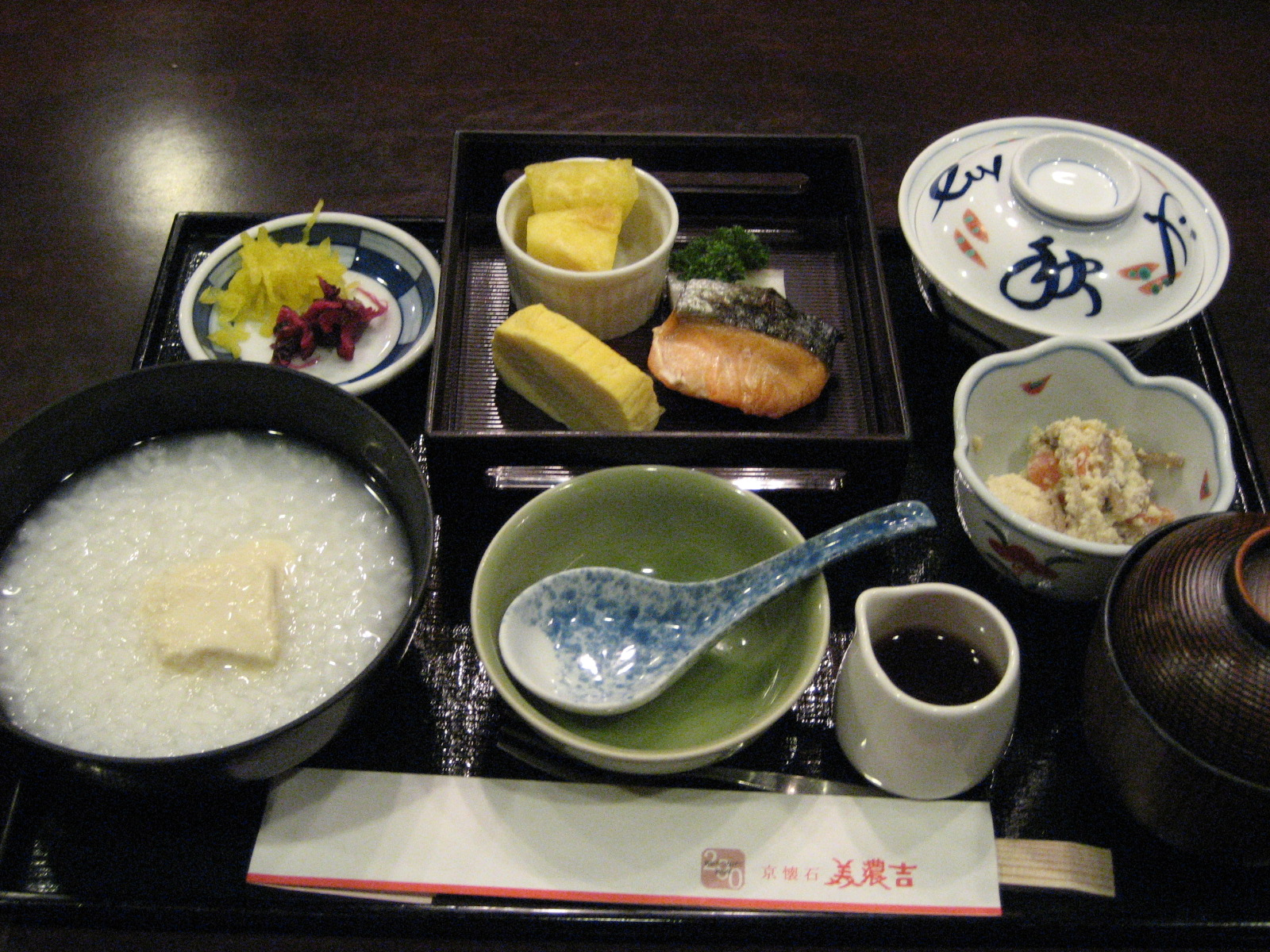
Rice porridge breakfast in Kyoto

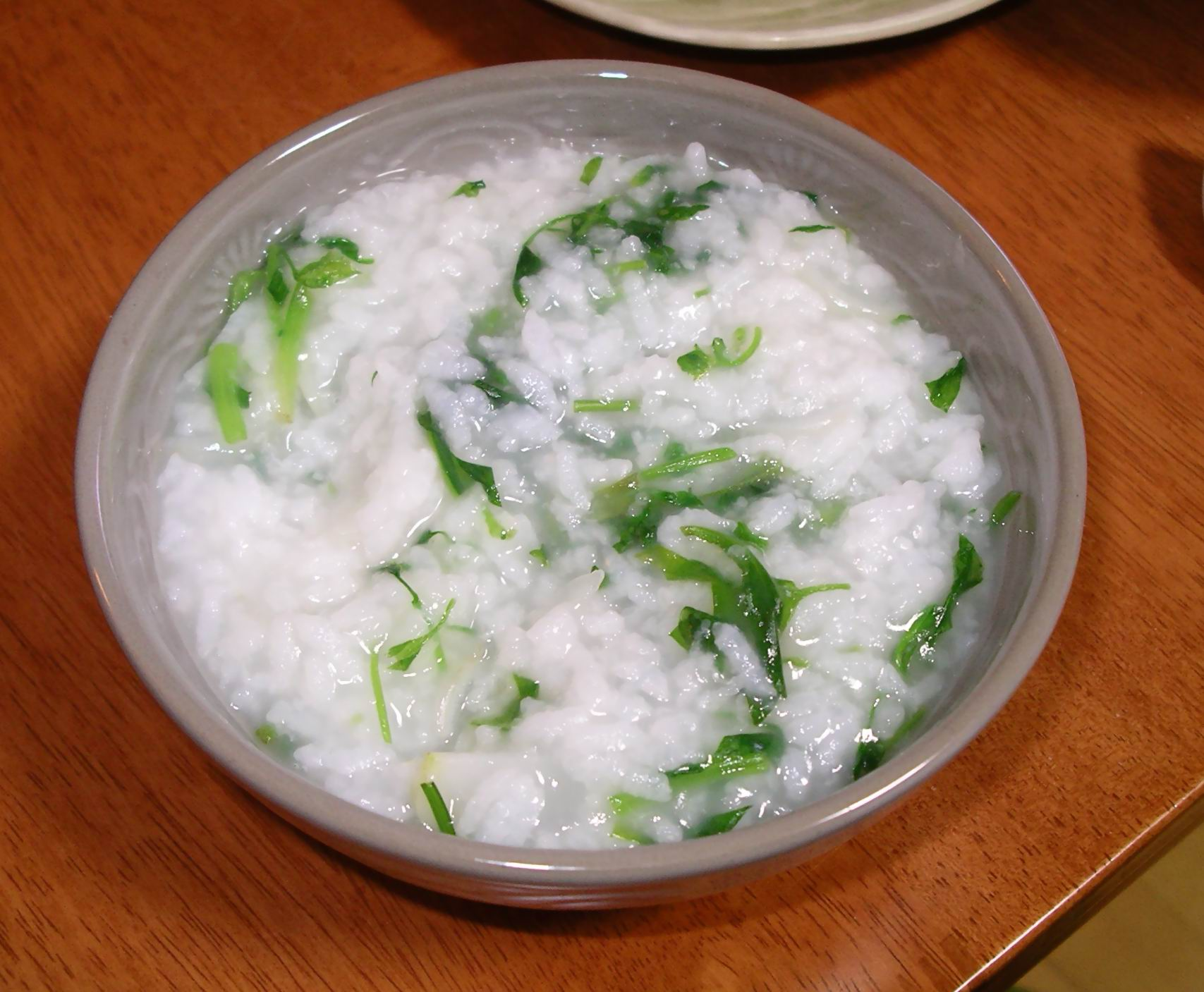
Nanakusa-gayu, seven-herb porridge

Kayu (粥), or often okayu (お粥) is the name for the type of congee eaten in Japan, which typically uses water to rice ratios of 5:1 or 7:1 and is cooked for about 30 minutes. There are recipes that use a water to rice ratio of up to 20:1.

Kayu may be made with just rice and water, and is often seasoned with salt. Eggs can be beaten into it to thicken it. Toppings may be added to enhance flavour; welsh onion, salmon, roe, ginger, and umeboshi (pickled plums) are among the most common. Miso or chicken stock may be used to flavor the broth. Most Japanese electric rice cookers have a specific setting for cooking congee.

In Japan, porridge – because it is soft and easily digestible – is regarded as a food particularly suitable for serving to the sick and elderly. For similar reasons, it is commonly the first solid food served to Japanese infants, being used to help with the transition from liquids to normally cooked rice, the latter being a major part of the Japanese diet.

A type of kayu referred to as nanakusa-gayu (七草粥, "seven herb porridge") is traditionally eaten on 7 January with special herbs that some believe protect against evils and invite good luck and longevity in the new year. As a simple, light dish, nanakusa-gayu serves as a break from the many heavy dishes eaten over the Japanese New Year.

Kayu is also used in Shinto divination rituals.

Zōsui (雑炊) is a similar dish, which uses already cooked rice, rather than cooking the rice in the soup.

==== Korea ====
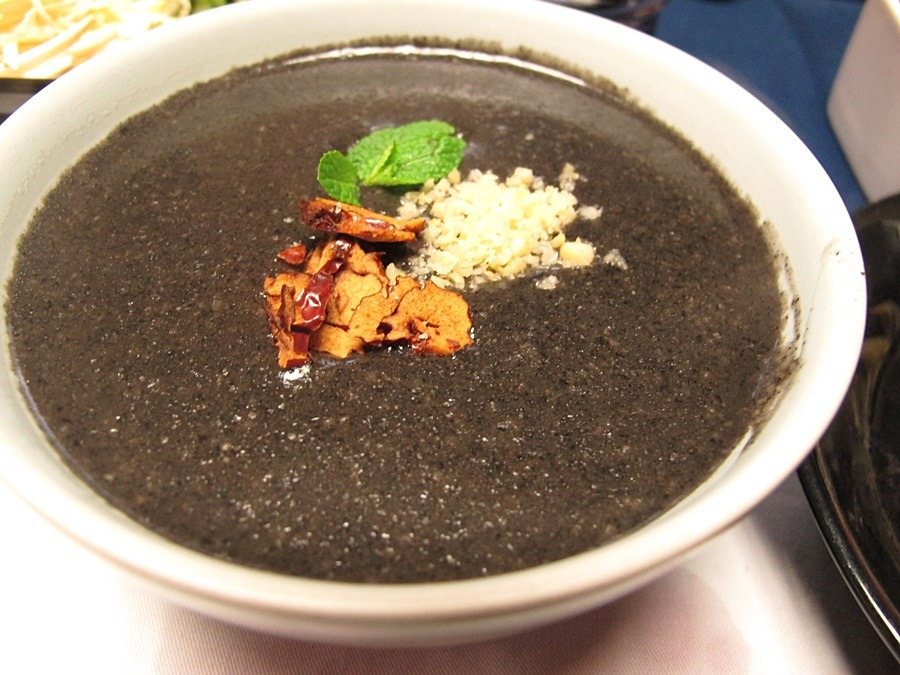
Heugimja-juk (black sesame porridge)

Juk (죽; 粥; [tɕuk̚]) is a Korean porridge dish made by boiling rice or other grains or legumes, such as beans, sesame, nuts, and pumpkin. Juk is often eaten warm, especially as a morning meal, but is now eaten at any time of the day.

Depending on the ingredients and consistency, juk can be considered as food for recuperation, a delicacy, or famine food. It is also sold commercially by many chain stores in South Korea, and is a common takeout dish.

The most basic form of juk, made from plain rice, is called ssaljuk (쌀죽; 'rice porridge') or huinjuk (흰죽; 'white porridge'). It is usually served with more flavorful side dishes, such as jeotgal (salted seafood) and various types of kimchi.

There are more than forty varieties of juk mentioned in historical documents. Notable varieties include jatjuk made from finely ground pine nuts, jeonbok-juk made with abalones, yulmu-juk made from yulmu (Coix lacryma-jobi var. ma-yuen), and patjuk made from red beans.

=== Southeast Asia ===
==== Myanmar ====
In Myanmar, congee is called hsan byoke or hsan pyoke, literally "(uncooked) rice boiled". It is plain porridge, often made with just rice and water, but sometimes with chicken or pork stock and served with a simple garnish of chopped spring onions and crispy fried onions. Paired with garnishes of choice. (Fish sauce, chilli flakes, etc.)

==== Cambodia ====
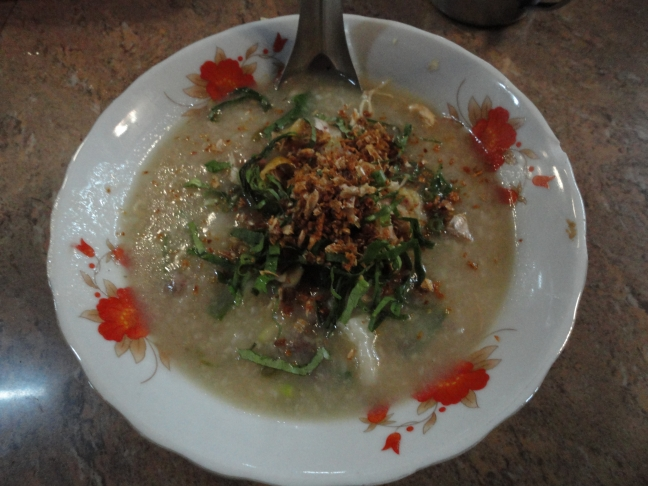
Cambodian chicken congee at the Old Market in Siem Reap

In Khmer, congee is called babor (បបរ). It is one of the options for breakfast along with kuyteav, another popular Cambodian breakfast dish. Congee is eaten throughout Cambodia both in the countryside and in the cities.

Congee can be eaten plain or with a variety of side dishes and toppings such as soy sauce, added to enhance taste, as well as dried salted fish or fried breadsticks (ឆាខ្វៃ, cha kway).

There are two main versions of congee: plain congee, and chicken congee (បបរមាន់, babor mŏən). It is usually eaten during the colder dry season or when someone is sick. After the congee is prepared, a variety of toppings can be added to enhance the flavour such as bean sprouts, green onions, coriander, pepper, along with the dried fish and fried breadsticks on the side. The chicken congee is the same as plain congee but contains more herbs and chicken.

==== Indonesia ====
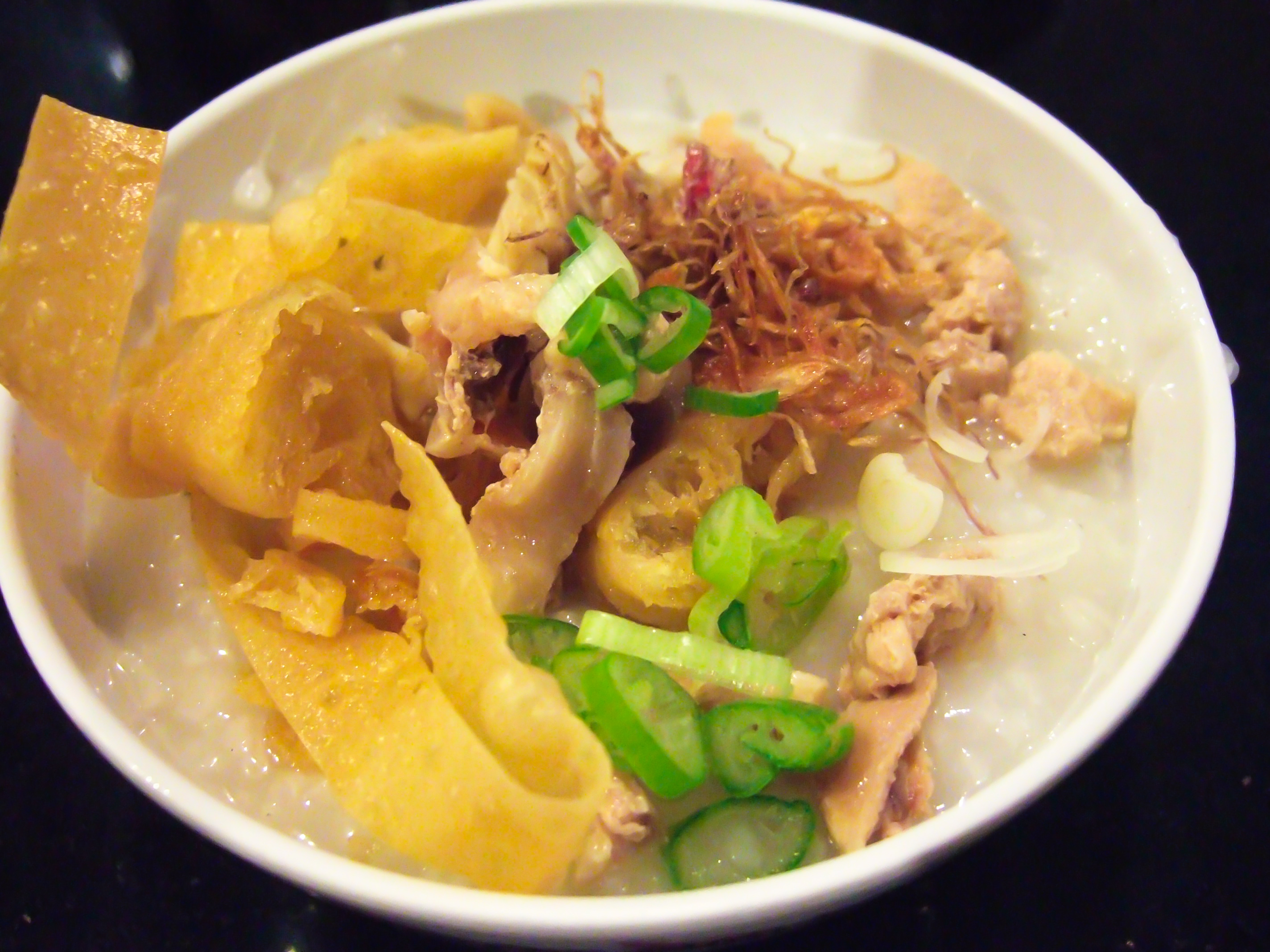
Bubur ayam, Indonesian chicken congee

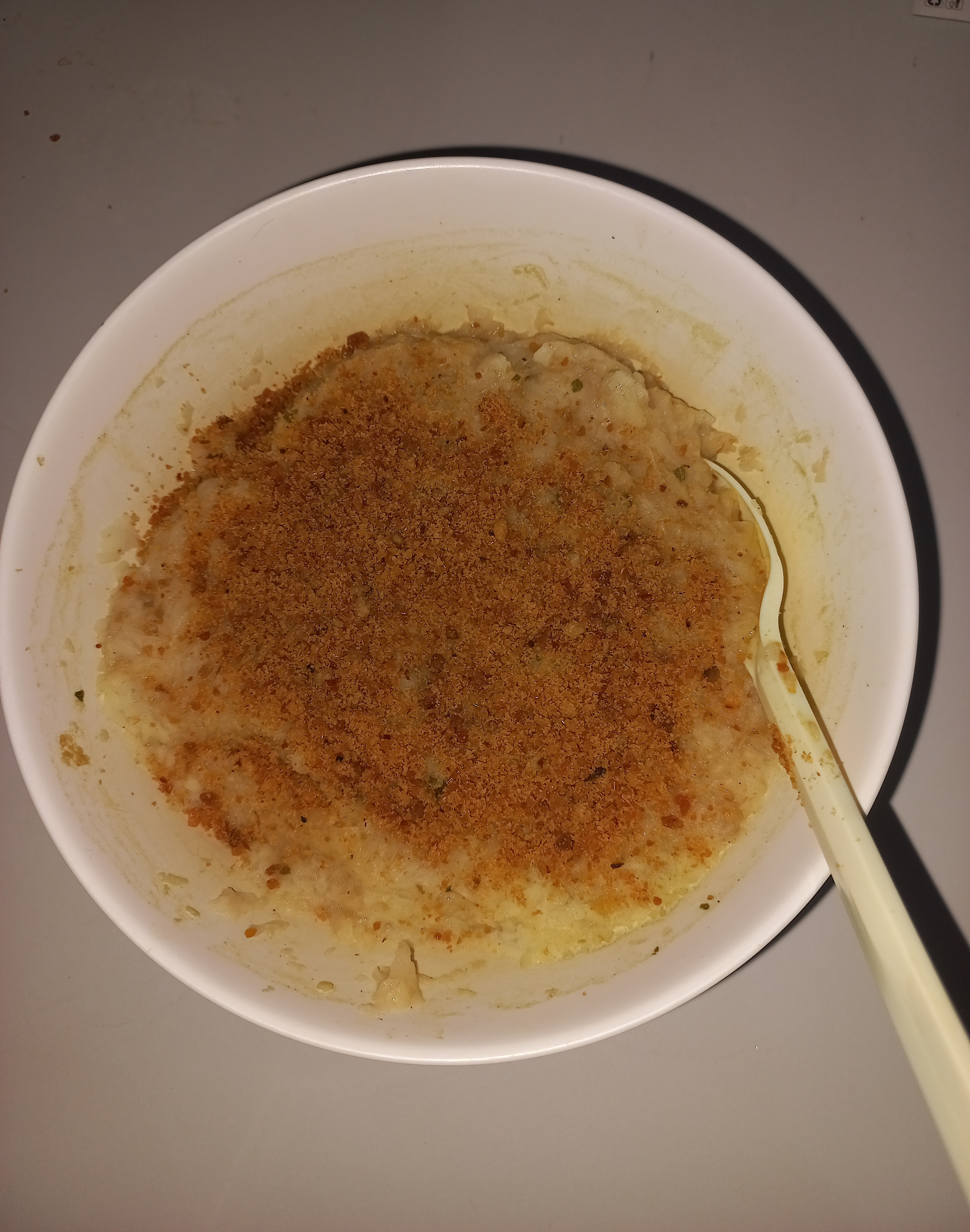
Instant chicken congee from a convenience store, served with meat floss

In Indonesia, congee is called bubur, and it is a popular breakfast food. Travelling bubur ayam vendors frequently pass through residential streets in the morning selling the dish. A popular version is bubur ayam, which is congee with shredded chicken meat. It is also served with many condiments, such as green onion, crispy fried shallot, fried soybean, Chinese crullers (youtiao, known as cakwe in Indonesia), both salty and sweet soy sauce, and sometimes it is topped with yellow chicken broth and kerupuk (Indonesian style crackers). Unlike some other Indonesian dishes, it is not spicy; sambal or chili paste is served separately.

Some food vendors serve sate alongside it, made from quail egg or chicken intestine, liver, gizzard, or heart.

On the north coast of Bali, famously in a village called Bondalem, there is a local congee dish called mengguh, a popular local chicken and vegetable congee that is spicier than common bubur ayam and more similar to tinutuan, using a spice mix of onions, garlic, coriander seeds, pepper and chili.

In another region of Indonesia, the city of Manado in North Sulawesi, there is a very popular type of congee called tinutuan, or also known as bubur Manado (Manadonese porridge). It is rice porridge served with ample amount of vegetables. A bit different from the one sold in Java, it is made from rice porridge, enriched with vegetables, including kangkung (water spinach), corn kernels, yam or sweet potato, dried salted fish, kemangi (lemon basil) leaves and melinjo (Gnetum gnemon) leaves.

In the eastern parts of Indonesia, the local congee is called papeda, which is made from sago flour. It is a staple food of Maluku and Papuan people. Usually, it is eaten with yellow soup made from tuna or mubara fish spiced with turmeric and lime.

==== Laos ====
In Laos, congee is called khao piak, literally "wet rice" (Lao: ເຂົ້າປຽກ, IPA: [kʰȁ(ː)w.pȉak]). It is cooked with rice and chicken broth or water. The congee is then garnished with fried garlic, scallions and pepper. The dish will sometimes be served with chicken, quail eggs, century eggs or youtiao. In Laos, congee is usually eaten as breakfast and during the cold season.

==== Malaysia ====
In Malaysia, congee is known as porridge or bubur.

==== Philippines ====
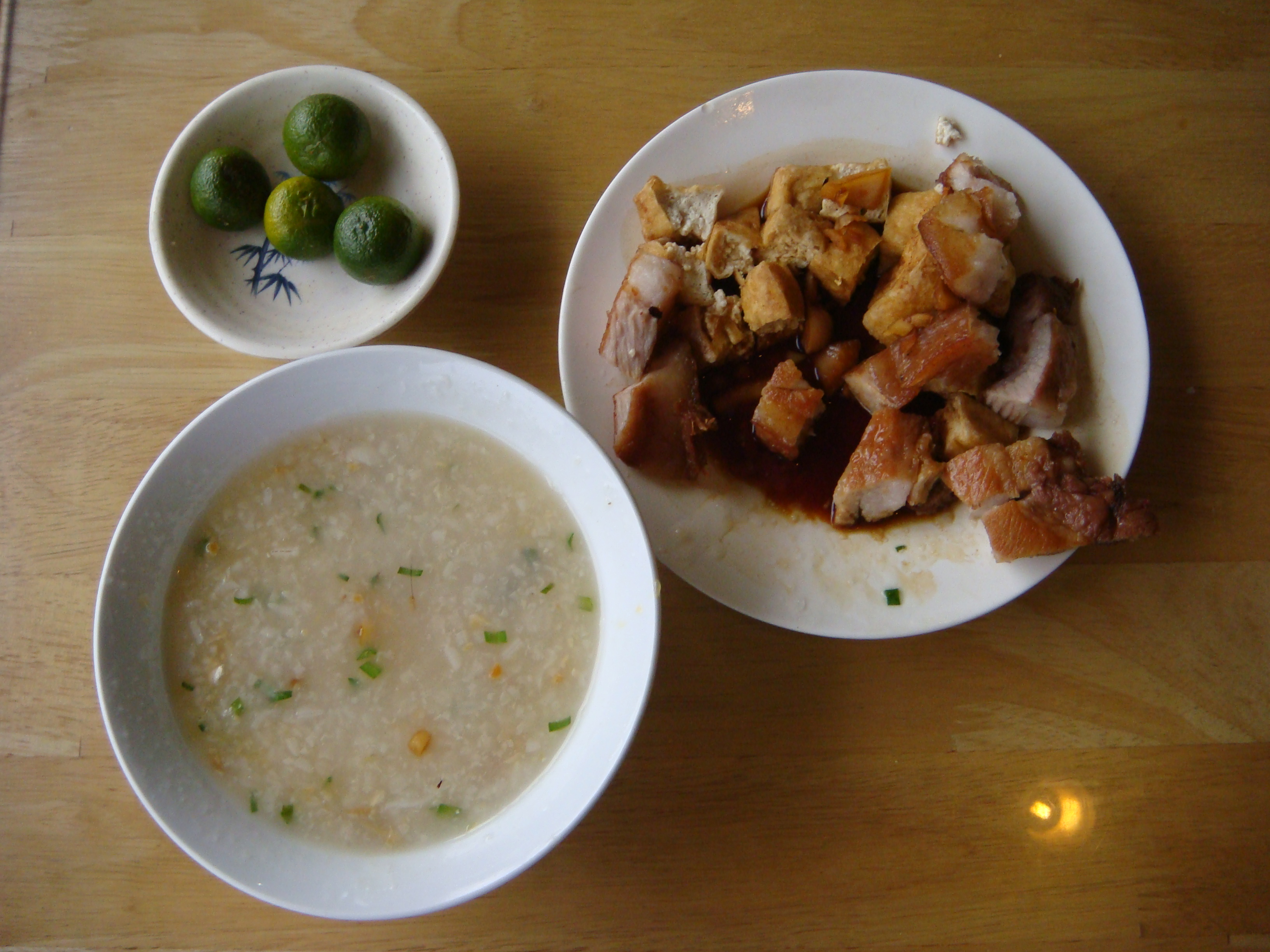
Bulacan Lugaw na tokwa't baboy, rice gruel with tokwa at baboy (tofu and pork, commonly referred to as "LTB")

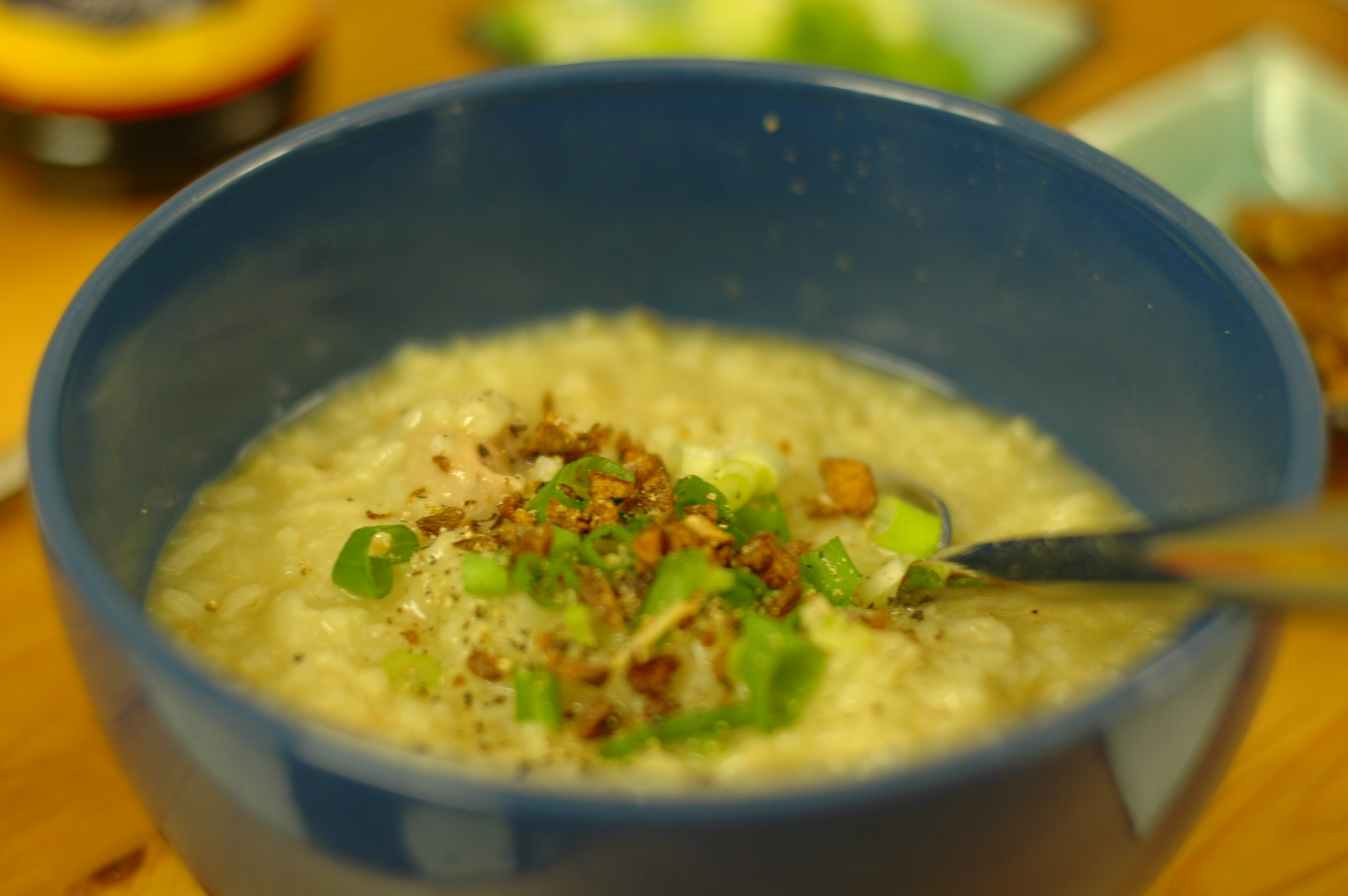
Arroz caldo, chicken rice gruel with ginger, scallions, toasted garlic, and safflower

Lugaw (pronounced Tagalog pronunciation: [ˈluɡaw]) is the Filipino generic term for rice gruel. (Note: "This dish is sometimes referred to as rice porridge and in the Philippines it is usually called lugaw or lugao (from Tagalog).") It encompasses a wide variety of dishes, ranging from savory dishes very similar to Chinese-style congee to dessert dishes. In the Visayan regions, savory lugaw are known as pospas. Lugaw typically use glutinous rice (Tagalog: malagkit; Visayan: pilit). It is usually thicker than other Asian congees, retaining the shape of the rice, yet with a similar texture.

Savory versions of lugaw are flavored with ginger and traditionally topped with scallions and toasted garlic. Dried red safflower (kasubha) may also be used as a topping, mainly as a visual garnish and to impart a more appealing yellow tinge to the dish. As with Japanese kayu, fish or chicken stock may be used to flavor the broth. The most popular variants of lugaw include arroz caldo (chicken), goto (beef tripe), lugaw na baboy (pork), lugaw na baka (beef), and lugaw na tokwa't baboy (diced tofu and pork). Other versions can also use tinapa (smoked fish), palakâ (frog legs), utak (brain [of pig]), dilà (tongue [of pig]), and litid ([beef] ligaments). They are traditionally seasoned with calamansi, fish sauce (patís), soy sauce (toyò), and black pepper. It is often served to the ill and the elderly, and is favored among Filipinos living in colder climates because it is warm, soft, and easy to digest.

Dessert versions of lugaw include champorado (lugaw with home-made chocolate topped with milk), binignit (lugaw in coconut milk with various fruits and root crops), and ginataang mais (lugaw with sweet corn and coconut milk), among others. Like the savory versions, they are usually eaten for breakfast, but can also be eaten as a snack. In Hiligaynon-speaking areas, lugaw may refer to binignit.

==== Singapore ====
In Singapore, Teochew porridge or Singapore-style porridge is a version of Singapore congee. In Singapore, it is considered a comfort food for both breakfast and supper. Teochew porridge dishes are often accompanied by various small plates of side dishes. Usually, it is served as a banquet of meats, fish egg and vegetables eaten with plain rice porridge. The recipes that early immigrants prepared in Singapore have been modified over the generations to suit local tastes. Singapore Teochew style porridge is usually consumed with a selection of Singaporean Chinese side dishes. There is no fixed list of side dishes, but in Singapore, accompaniments typically include lor bak (braised pork), steamed fish, stir-fried water spinach (kangkong goreng), salted egg, fish cake, tofu, omelette, minced meat, braised tau kwa, Hei Bee Hiang (fried shrimp chilli paste), and vegetables.

==== Thailand ====
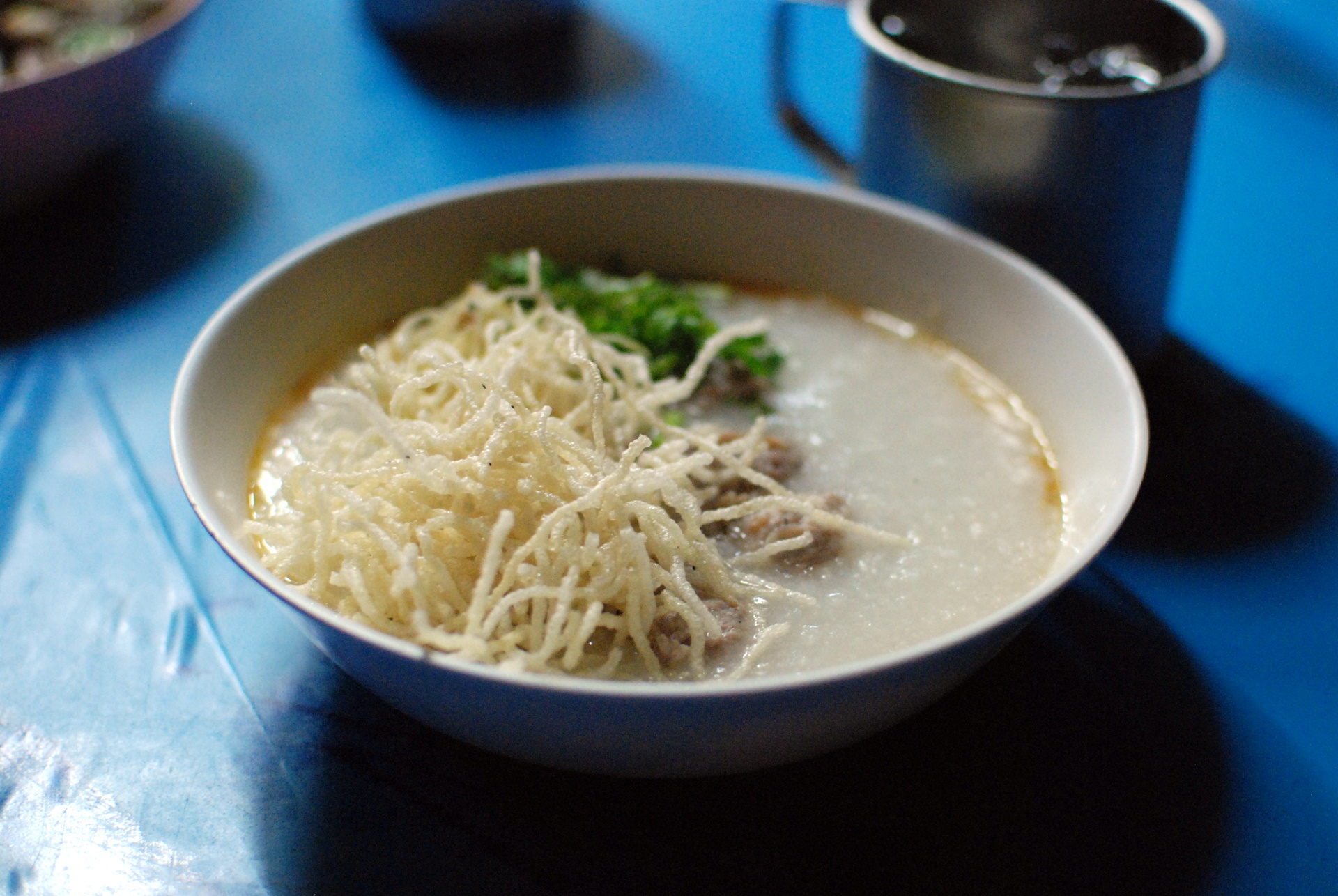
Jok mu sap: Thai congee with minced pork

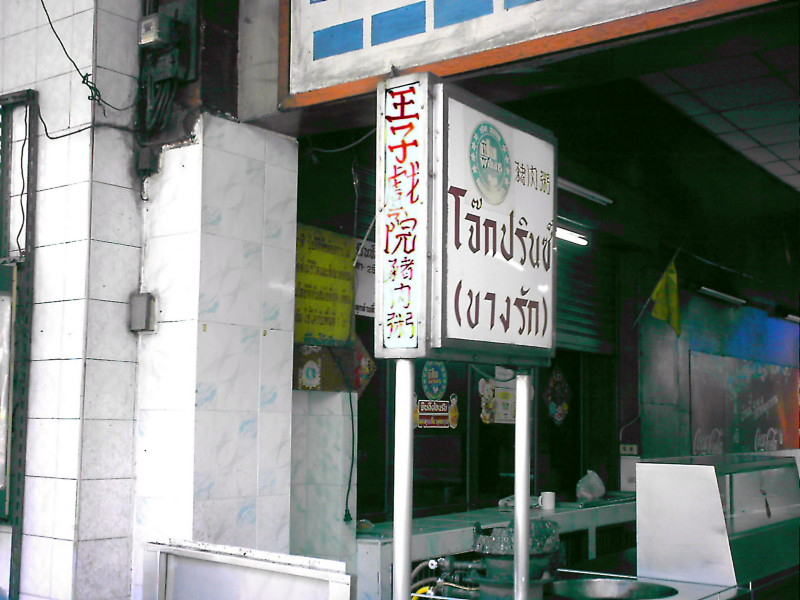
Jok Prince or written Jok Prince, a Bib Gourmand Jok eatery in Bang Rak

In Thai cuisine, rice porridge, known as Chok or Jok (Thai: โจ๊ก, IPA: [tɕóːk], a loanword from Min Nan Chinese), is often served as breakfast with a raw or partially cooked egg added. Minced pork or beef and chopped spring onions are usually added, and the dish is optionally topped with a small donut-like pathongko, fried garlic, slivered ginger, and spicy pickles such as pickled radish. Although it is more popular as a breakfast dish, many stores specializing in Jok sell it throughout the day. Variations in the meat and toppings are also frequently found. It is especially popular during Thailand's cool season.

Plain congee, known as khao tom kui (Thai: ข้าวต้มกุ๊ย), is served at specialty restaurants, which serve a multitude of side dishes to go with it, such as yam kun chiang (a Thai salad made with sliced dried Chinese sausages), mu phalo (pork stewed in soy sauce and five-spice powder), mu nam liap (minced pork fried with chopped Chinese olives), and pla rak kluai thot krob or pla rak kluai thot kratiam (deep-frying or frying with garlic horseface loach).

Notable Jok eateries in Bangkok can be found in areas like Bang Rak on Charoen Krung, home to Jok Prince which received the Bib Gourmand from Michelin Guidebook, Talat Noi in Chinatown beside Wat Traimit near Hua Lamphong, and the Chok Chai neighbourhood in Lat Phrao, where the dish is available 24 hours a day. Khao tom kui is found in areas, such as the Yaowarat and Wong Wian Yi Sip Song Karakadakhom (July 22 Circle).

In a popular reference within the 2011 US comedy film The Hangover Part II set in Thailand, Jok is described as being a food for ″small babies and very old people″ with ″no taste″ that is nourishment ″everybody can digest″. The reference is used to describe the character of the protagonist Stu Price (portrayed by Ed Helms).

==== Vietnam ====
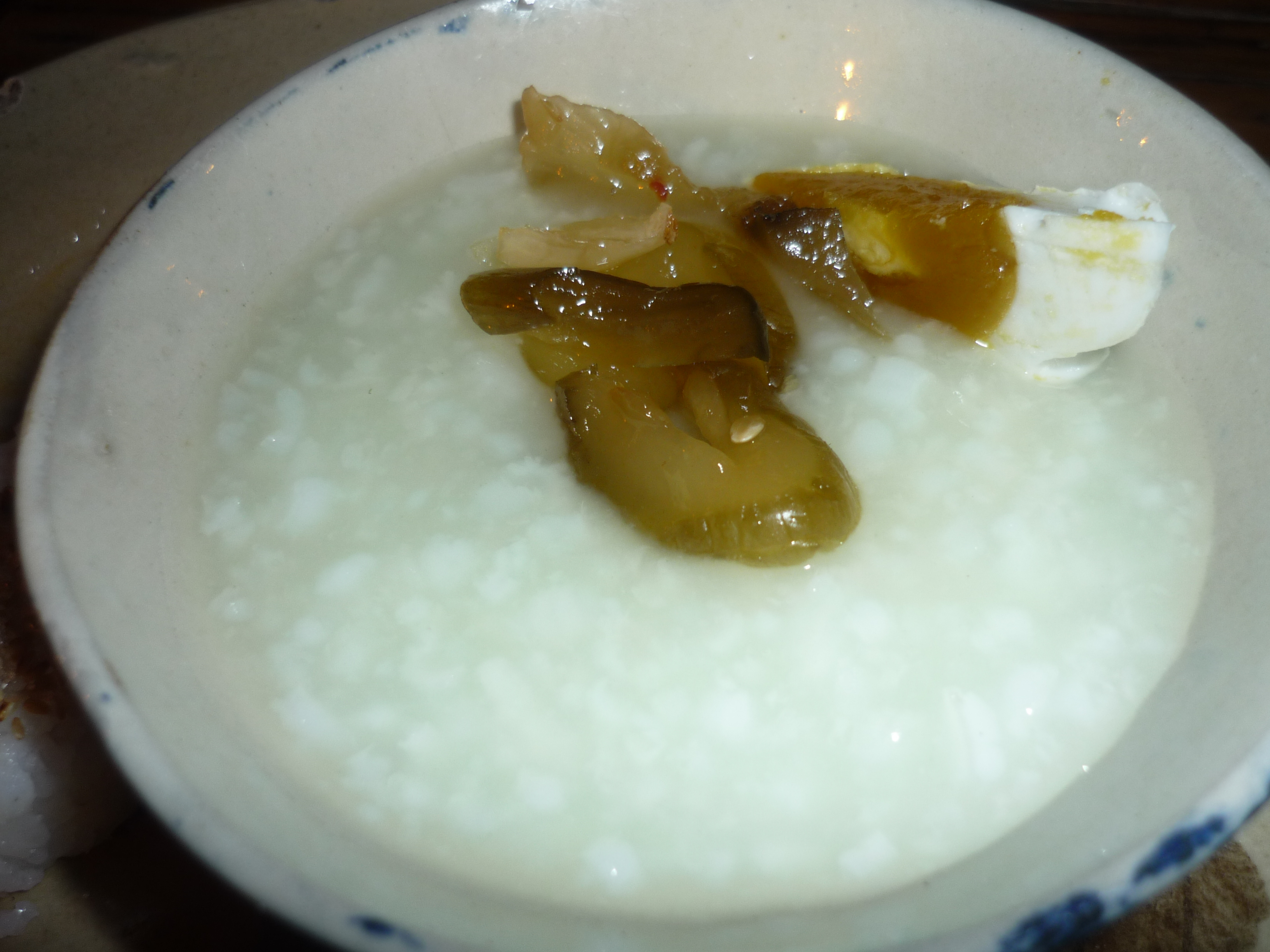
A simple cháo

In Vietnam, congee (Vietnamese: cháo) is sometimes cooked with pandan leaves or Asian mung bean. In its simplest form (plain rice porridge, known as cháo hoa), it is a food for times of famine and hardship to stretch the rice ration. Alternately, as is especially common among Buddhist monks, nuns and lay persons, it can be a simple breakfast food eaten with pickled vegetables or fermented bean curd (chao).

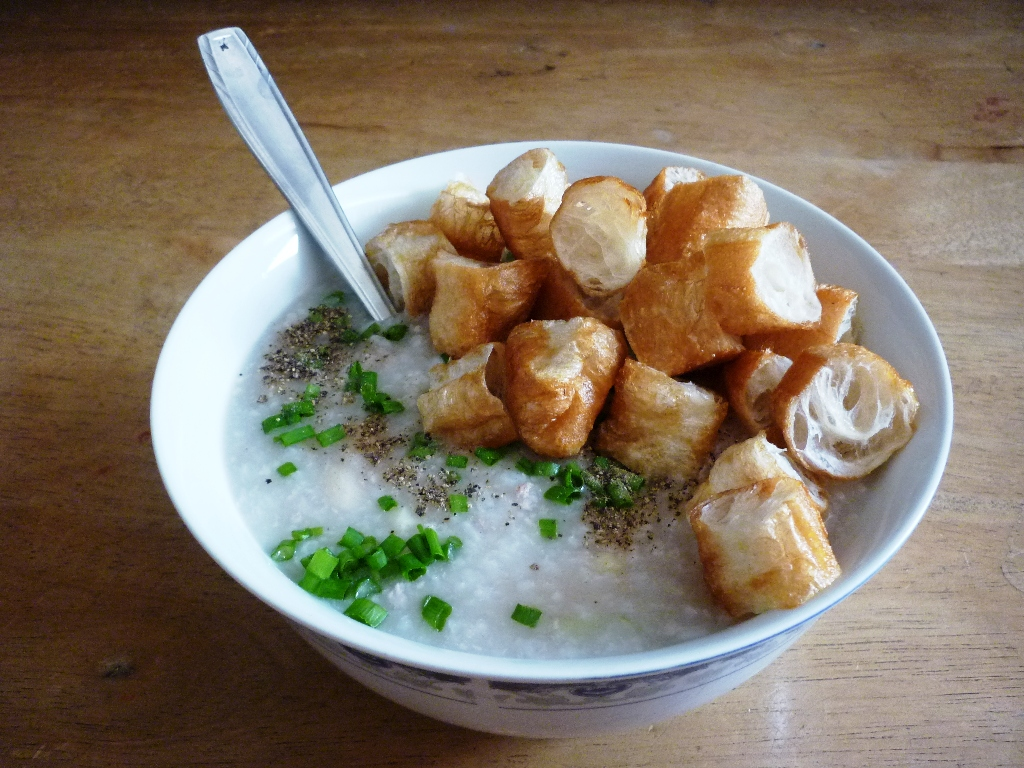
Vietnamese congee with cháo quẩy

Despite its ubiquity among the poor, it is also popular as a main dish when cooked with a variety of meats. For example, cháo gà is cooked with chicken, garlic, and ginger. The rice porridge is cooked in chicken broth, and when the chicken is cooked, the meat is sliced and layered on a bed of shredded raw cabbage and sliced scallions and drizzled with a vinegar-based sauce to be eaten as a side dish. Other combinations include cháo vịt (duck porridge), which is cooked in the same manner as chicken porridge. Cháo lòng heo is made with lòng heo, a variety of offal from pork or duck with sliced portions of congealed pork blood. Cháo is typically served with quẩy on the side.

Cháo bầu dục is a congee containing pig kidney (bầu dục lợn). A specialty of the Hóc Môn District in Ho Chi Minh City, it is typically eaten in rural areas of southern Vietnam. Well-known cháo bầu vendors include Cánh Đồng Hoang, Cô Ba Nữ, and Sáu Quẻn. Another typical Vietnamese dish is cháo nấm, a congee with mushrooms.

Youtiao is usually added to congee especially at congee vendors.

It is also common to eat cháo when ill, as it is believed the porridge is easy to digest while being fortifying. For such purposes, the cháo is sometimes cooked with roasted white rice, giving the porridge broth a more nuanced body and a subtle, nutty flavor. In some parts of Vietnam, local customs call for making cháo as offerings for the "wandering souls" during the Buddhist Vu Lan summer feast.

=== South Asia ===
==== Tamil Nadu ====
The etymon of the word congee, Kanji (கஞ்சி/kañci) is a popular dish in the state of Tamil Nadu. Among the working classes, it is a staple nourishing breakfast dish, although consumed often for lunch and dinner as well. In addition, all classes regard kanji as an excellent food during convalescence, for its ability to be easily digested. In Tamil Nadu includes the rice kanji which is considered the most popular: variations of this include sweet rice kanji (milk and sugar/jaggery added to the cooked rice soup). Kanji is also prepared with different grains, such as minor millet or pearl millet, finger millet, mung bean, broken wheat, and maize. Multi-grain kanji is also made.

According to the Indian writer Madhur Jaffrey, kanji is, or derives from, a Tamil word for "boiling"—which refers to the porridge and also to any water in which rice has been cooked.

Muslims of south India especially Tamil Muslim, Mappila and Beary prepare special congee during Ramadhan called nombu kanj (lit. 'fasting porridge'). This is prepared by adding spices like turmeric, dry ginger, pepper, onion, and coconut paste to the congee. Sometimes fenugreek seeds are added to it to enhance the flavour.

==== Karnataka ====
In Karnataka, a plain rice porridge, or the thick supernatant water from overcooked rice, is known as ganji (ಗಂಜಿ). In coastal districts of Dakshina Kannada and Udupi of Karavali region of Karnataka state, Ganji made from parboiled or red, brown or white rice was the staple food of most inhabitants of those districts. A special type of Ganji is prepared on the occasion of Dwadashi in Tulu-speaking Shivalli Brahmin households. Even today still many households in those districts have Ganji as staple food.

==== Maharashtra ====
In the Konkan region of Maharashtra in India, congee is known as pez, is a home remedy for treating a fever as it is easy to digest. The farming and manual labour community of the same region, on the other hand, consume it on a daily basis in the late morning as a source of energy. Variants of the dish include nachnyachi pez (ambil) which is made with ragi and rice, athwal or metheachi pez is a sweeter version which is made with rice, fenugreek and jaggery, which is usually served to a nursing mother. The rice here is usually eaten boiled, with dry fish, vegetables or pickles.

==== Western Karnataka and Goa ====
In Goa state and Udupi and Dakshina Kannada districts, people usually eat rice ganji in a variant manner made by Kannada-speaking, Tulu-speaking or Konkani people in and around Udupi and Mangalore (Karnataka, South India). There, parboiled rice (kocheel akki in Kannada, oorpel aari for black rice, bolenta aari for white rice in Tulu or ukde tandool in Konkani) is steamed with a large amount of water. Jain ganji matt are famous in these districts. Usually, simple ganji with pickle and milk are served, in Jain matts. Fresh coconut is grated, and the resulting milk skimmed and added to the ganji (called paez or pyaaz in Konkani), which is served hot with fish curry, coconut chutney, or Indian pickles. In Goa, it is normally served with dried or fresh cooked fish, papad or vegetables.

==== Kerala ====
In the Indian state of Kerala, kanji used to be considered as a main course, particularly for dinner, by the majority. This is normally taken with roasted coconut chutney, tossed mung bean known locally as payar, roasted pappadam (lentil crackers), puzhukku (a side dish consisting mainly of root tubers/underground stems, especially during Thiruvathira); sometimes coconut scrapings are also added to the kanji to increase the flavour. The royal households as well as rich people used to have a special kind of kanji called as palkanji (lit. 'milk congee') where milk was substituted for water base. During the Malayalam month of Karkkidakam, a medicinal kanji is made using Ayurvedic herbs, milk and jaggery. Karkkidakam is known as the month of diseases since the monsoon starts during Karkkidakam. Karikkidaka kanji is eaten to promote the immune system.

Some households of Kerala used to re-cook leftover rice and all available leftover curries into congee water and take as a mix-mash dish known as pazhamkanji (old congee). Pazhamkanji means old congee (leftover from the previous day). It is not necessarily re-heated with leftover curries.

==== Andhra Pradesh ====
In the state of Andhra Pradesh, it is called ganji in Telugu. Ganji is made by boiling rice in large amounts of water and then the filtered liquid is known as Ganji. Ganji mixed with buttermilk is believed to add to the flavor, and is also suggested by doctors for patients with ailing health.

==== Odisha ====
Kaanji is a traditional Odia dish. It is a soup-based dish like dal, but tastes a little sour. It is made of rice starch fermented for a few days in an earthen pot. This is considered a healthy dish as many winter vegetables are used as main ingredients. It is seasoned with mustard seeds and turmeric and served hot. Pakhala is a separate dish with certain similarities to the congee.

In the Buddhist Yāgu Sutta of the Aṅguttara Nikāya (AN 5.207), the Buddha recommends eating rice porridge, "yāgu": "There are these five benefits in rice porridge. What five? It stills hunger, dispels thirst, settles wind, cleans out the bladder, and promotes the digestion of the remnants of undigested food. These are the five benefits of rice porridge.".

==== Sri Lanka ====
In Sri Lanka, several types of congee are known as kenda in Sinhalese. Sinhala people use congee as a breakfast, a side dish, an accessory to indigenous medical therapies, and a sweet. Kenda can be prepared with many ingredients, including rice, roasted rice, rice flour, finger millet flour, sago, coconut milk, herbs, tubers, kitul flour, and mung bean. When it is prepared with rice and water only, it is known as hal kenda. If salt is added to bring a much saltier taste, it is known as lunu kenda, a dish commonly used as a supplementary diet in purgation therapy in indigenous medical traditions. If roasted rice is used, the congee becomes bendi hal kenda, used to treat diarrheal diseases. If rice flour and coconut milk are the main ingredients, such congee is known as kiriya. If finger millet flour and water is used, it is known as kurakkan anama. If coconut milk is added, the dish is called kurakkan kenda. If sago is used, such congee is known as sawu kenda. A special type of congee prepared from the byproducts of coconut oil production is known as pol kiri kenda. There are many varieties of kola kenda, congee with herbs as an ingredient; sometimes, a vaidya or veda mahttaya (a physician trained in indigenous medical traditions) might prescribe a special type of kola kenda, known under such circumstances as behet kenda. Sinhala villagers use specific tubers for preparing congee, such as Diascorea species tubers. If kitul flour is mixed with boiling water and coconut milk added to it, this special type of congee is known as kitul piti kenda. Kenda prepared with mung beans is known as mung eta kenda.

Most of the time, kiriya, kurakkan kenda, sawu kenda, pol kiri kenda and kitul piti kenda are used as sweets. Sugar, candy, dates, raisins, cashew nut, jaggery, and treacle are among the ingredients that may be added to sweeten these congees.

Congee is also eaten by Sri Lankan Moors for iftar during Ramadan. It is also occasionally made with oats. Tamils and Moors in Sri Lanka call it arisi kanji (rice kanji) and may use chicken or beef for it. It is just as often made with milk (paal kanji), and there are many other combinations with appropriate prefixes in Tamil; one very special type is Chithirai kanji, Chithirai being the Tamil month coinciding with April/May, made for a festival in this month. It is a salty simple kanji with green chilis, onions and coconut milk.

==== Nepal ====
In Nepal, congee is known as jaulo, it can be prepared by mixing pulses like moong or red lentil, or plain with salt and lots of water. It is tempered with fenugreek seeds and ghee. It is considered a light food which is why it eaten in sick days or as light supper.

==== Maldives ====
Baipen is a bland rice porridge from the Maldives. During Ramadan, Maldivian Muslims break their fast with baipen and Rihaakuru. It is eaten with maskurolhi, a spicy tuna and coconut sambal.

Baipen can be made savory or sweet depending on the occasion, and its preparation varies regionally. In Eydhafushi, baipen is fermented for a week before consumption. It is known as 'Honihiru baipen' (Saturday rice porridge) since it is consumed on Saturday.

=== The Americas ===
==== Caribbean Tamil Community ====
Among the Indo-Caribbean Tamil Community, a dish called "Kandji" or "Kanchi" is made with rice, chickpeas, black eyed peas, onions, grated coconuts, and salt. It is traditionally eaten after a puja and is traditionally offered to Kali Amman (a syncretic mix of Mariamman and Kali), the main goddess of the Caribbean Tamil Community (see also: Caribbean Shaktism). The ingredients are traditionally gathered from begging door to door and then preparing the dish in the temple's complex.

=== Europe ===
==== Hungary ====
In Hungary, it is called rizskása, a traditional Hungarian food in the Hungarian population of Upper-Hungary (today Slovakia) and is also used as strudel filling.

==== Portugal ====
In Portugal, a traditional soup made of rice and chicken meat is named canja or canja de galinha. The Portuguese had likely picked up the dish from their colonies in Western/Southern India or Sri Lanka; where the soup remains a staple (particularly for the ill). The rice is not cooked for as long as in Asian congee, so it is very soft, but not disintegrated. Traditionally, a boiling fowl containing small, immature eggs is used; the eggs are carefully boiled and served in the canja. This soup is sometimes served with a fresh mint leaf on top. Strongly valued as comfort food, it is traditionally given to people recovering from disease, as in Asia, and in some regions of Portugal, there is even a custom of feeding the mother a strict diet of canja in the first weeks after childbirth. It is also eaten traditionally in Brazil and Cape Verde, former Portuguese colonies.

== See also ==
- Bap
- Cooked rice
- Curd rice
- Gruel
- Kasha
- Lâpa
- Mieum
- Oatmeal
- Papeda
- Rice cereal
- Rice pudding
- Sampan congee
- Sungnyung
- List of ancient dishes
- List of porridges
