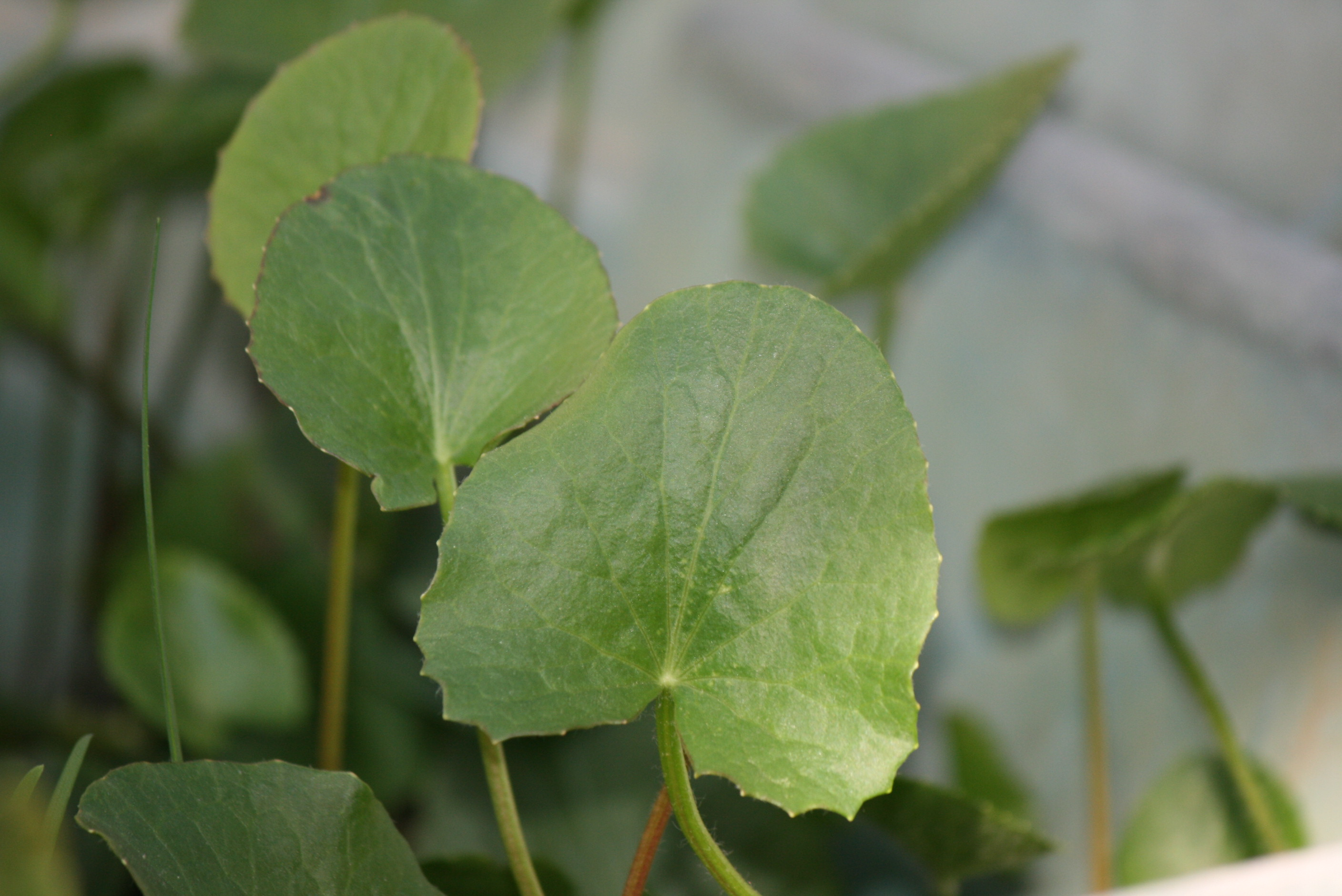

Scientific classification
- Kingdom: Plantae
- Clade: Tracheophytes
- Clade: Angiosperms
- Clade: Eudicots
- Clade: Asterids
- Order: Apiales
- Family: Apiaceae
- Genus: Centella
- Species: C. erecta

Binomial name
- Centella erecta (L.fil.) Fernald (1940)

Synonyms
- Hydrocotyle erecta L.fil. (1782)

= Centella erecta =

Erect centella

Species of plant

Centella erecta, or erect centella, is a member of the carrot family, Apiaceae. It is a perennial herb found throughout temperate regions of the Americas, from New Jersey to Chile.
