= Carex thunbergii =

Scientific classification
- Kingdom: Plantae
- Clade: Tracheophytes
- Clade: Angiosperms
- Clade: Monocots
- Clade: Commelinids
- Order: Poales
- Family: Cyperaceae
- Genus: Carex
- Species: C. thunbergii

Binomial name
- Carex thunbergii Steud.

Species of plant

Carex thunbergii is a tussock-forming species of perennial sedge in the family Cyperaceae. It is native to parts of eastern Asia from around Manchuria in the west to Japan in the east. It is found in Primorye to the north to Korea in the south.

The sedge has a rhizome producing long runners. The culm has a triangular cross-section and are 40 to 100 cm (16 to 39 in) in height. The smooth culms can have a rough texture toward the top and are surrounded at the base by sheaths with a light brown colour that fall apart into a fibrous mass with age. The flat linear leaves are about the same length as the culms and are about 3 mm (0.12 in) wide with rough margins.

The species was first described by the botanist Ernst Gottlieb von Steudel in 1446 as a part of the journal Flora. It has six synonyms; Carex gaudichaudiana var. thunbergii, Carex brachysandra, Carex koidzumiana, Carex thunbergii var. brachysandra, Carex thunbergii var. platycarpa and Carex thunbergii var. quinquenervis.

== See also ==
- List of Carex species
