= Gruel =

Food consisting of cereal in water or milk

- Type: Porridge
- Main ingredients: Cereal meal or flour, water or milk
- Variations: Congee

Gruel is a food consisting of some type of cereal—such as ground oats, wheat, rye, or rice—heated or boiled in water or milk. It is a thinner version of porridge that may be more often drunk rather than eaten. Historically, gruel has been a staple of the Western diet, especially for peasants. Gruel may also be made from millet, hemp, barley, and during times of famine, from chestnut flour or less-bitter acorns of some oaks, as famine food. Gruel has historically been associated with feeding the sick and recently weaned children.

Gruel is also a colloquial expression for any watery food of unknown character, e.g., pea soup. Gruel has often been associated with poverty, with negative associations attached to the term in popular culture, as in the Charles Dickens novels Oliver Twist and A Christmas Carol.

== History ==
Gruel predates the earliest civilizations, emerging in hunter-gatherer societies as a meal of gathered grains soaked in water. For these societies, the application of water and especially heat to grain improved its digestibility and nutritional content, and sanitized the mixture. This gruel also presented a viable medium for yeast to develop and ferment, serving as an important precursor for both bread and beer.

Gruel was the staple food of the ancient Greeks, for whom roasted meats were the extraordinary feast that followed sacrifice, even among heroes, and "in practice, bread was a luxury eaten only in towns." Roman plebeians "ate the staple gruel of classical times, supplemented by oil, the humbler vegetables, and salt fish," for gruel could be prepared without access to the communal ovens in which bread was baked. In the Middle Ages, peasants could avoid the tithe by paying in grain ground by the miller of the landowner's mill. When eaten by the peasant, the process was to roast the grains to make them digestible and grind small portions in a mortar at home. In lieu of cooking the resulting paste on the hearthstone, it could be simmered in a cauldron with water or, luxuriously, with milk.

In the United Kingdom, it was a common remedy for the sick, relatively nourishing and easy to digest, and a standard component of the evening meal in British hospitals into the early 20th century.

In the Americas, maize gruels were once one of the main food sources for many Mesoamerican peoples, such as the Maya and Aztecs. Atole is a preparation of ground maize often flavored with chili and salt (for a savory dish), or, in more modern times, with piloncillo and cinnamon (for a sweet dish). It can be consumed as an important calorie source as a thicker meal, or as a liquid drink.

Gruel was on the third-class menu of the Titanic on the eve of her sinking in April 1912.

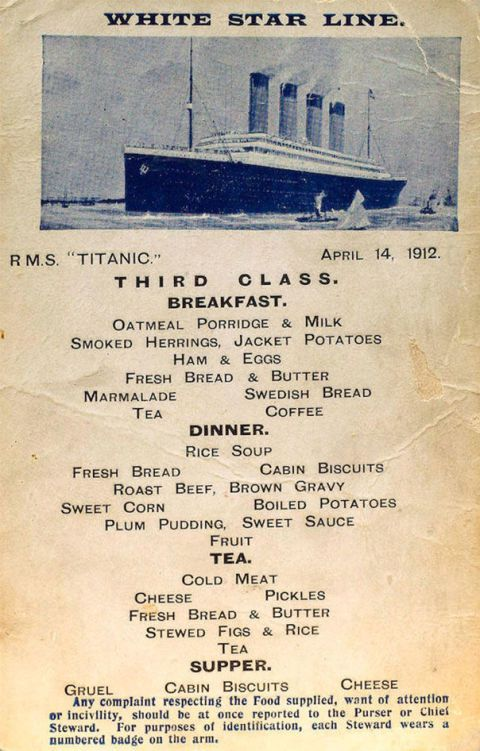
Third-class menu aboard the Titanic dated 14 April 1912, the day before it sank; gruel was offered as part of supper

== Variations ==
In many Spanish-speaking countries, several gruels are made; the masa-based drink or spoonable food called atole or atol de elote is a staple throughout Central America, served hot. It can range in consistency from a thin cloudy drink to a thicker porridge-like food. Horchata is a chilled, sweetened drink of a similar nature to thin atole. It is made from ground nutmeats or seeds, grains (often rice), and seasonings such as vanilla and cinnamon, served over ice.

Rice gruels eaten throughout Asia are normally referred to in English as "porridge" as opposed to gruel. Common forms include congee (derived from the Tamil word for the dish), Chinese zhou/zuk, Japanese okayu, Korean juk, Filipino goto, and Vietnamese cháo. Asian porridges/gruels are typically savory, with meat or vegetables added and stock sometimes used as the liquid cooking element.

== Etymology ==
The Oxford English Dictionary gives an etymology of Middle English gruel from the same word in Old French, both of them deriving from a source in Late Latin: grutellum (a diminutive, as the form of the word demonstrates), possibly from an Old Frankish *grūt, surmised on the basis of a modern cognate grout. In modern Dutch, the plural word "grutten" still refers to de-husked, coarse ground grain and a traditional dish based on pearlbarley and blackberry is called watergruwel. The Old French gruel gave rise to the Modern French gruau, which in North America refers to porridge and oatmeal as modern breakfast cereals.

The Old Norse word grautr, meaning "coarse-ground grain", gave rise to the Icelandic grautur, Faroese greytur, Norwegian grøt (nynorsk graut), Danish grød, and the Swedish and Elfdalian gröt, all meaning porridge, of which gruel is a subtype.

The German Grießmehl ("ground grain"), and Dutch griesmeel, are compounded cognates of English grist and meal.

== In fiction ==
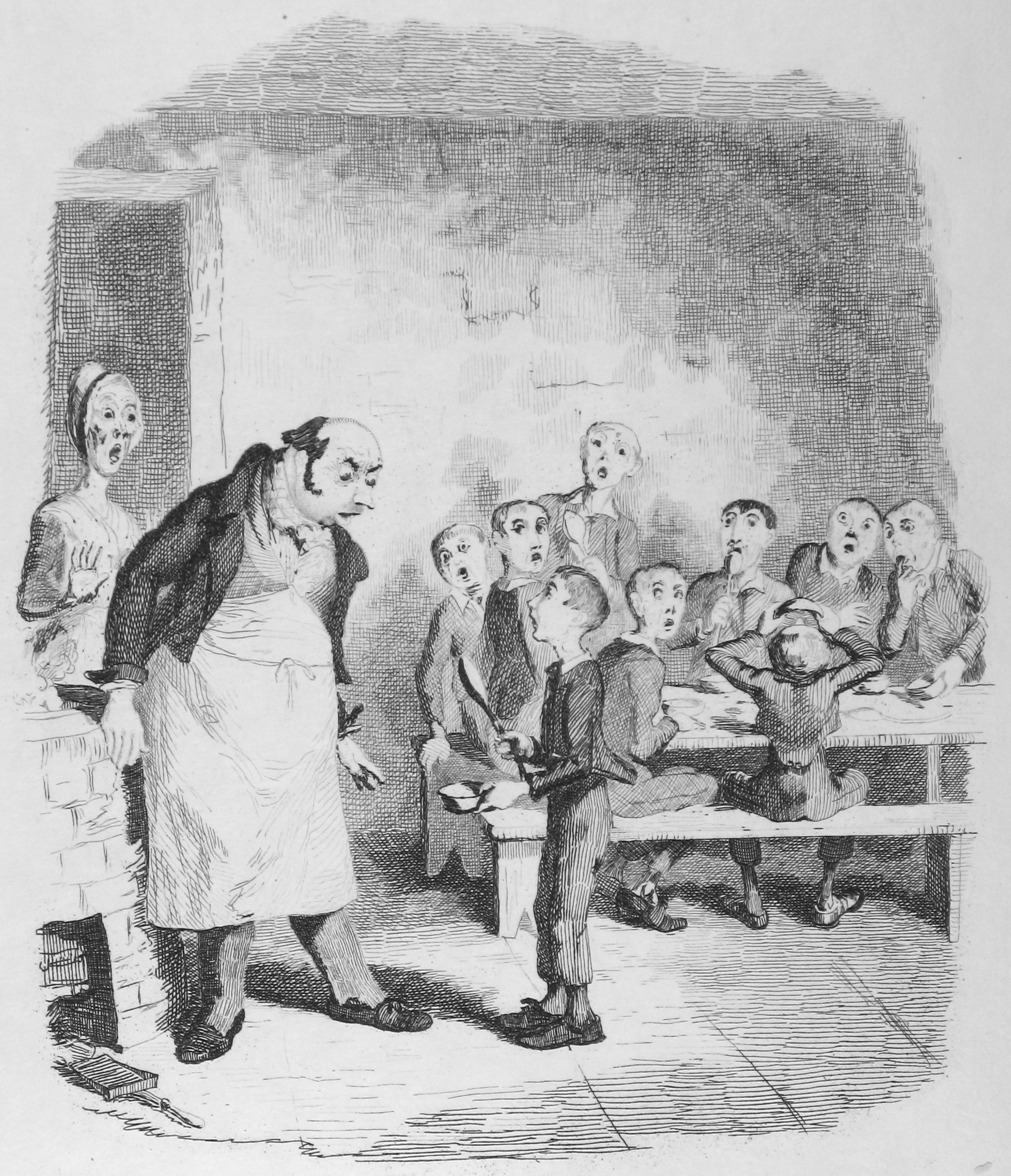
"Oliver asking for more", an engraving in The Writings of Charles Dickens Volume 4, published in 1894.

In the English-speaking world, gruel is remembered as the food of the child workhouse inmates in Charles Dickens's Industrial Revolution novel Oliver Twist (1838), where the workhouse was supplied with "an unlimited supply of water" and "small quantities of oatmeal". When Oliver asks the master of the workhouse for some more, he is struck with a blow on the head for doing so. The "small saucepan of gruel" waiting upon Ebenezer Scrooge's hob in Dickens's 1843 novel A Christmas Carol emphasizes how miserly Scrooge is. Gruel is also Mr. Woodhouse's preferred and offered dish in Jane Austen's Emma (1816), often to comic or sympathetic effect. References to gruel in popular culture today continue to refer to miserly or starvation conditions, such as Gemma Collins in Celebrity Big Brother 17 (2016), who was restricted to a diet of gruel.
