= Cerealicious =

Fast food chain in the Philippines

- Type: Private
- Industry: Restaurants
- Founded: January 4, 2006; 20 years ago in Manila, Philippines
- Defunct: January 31, 2020; 6 years ago
- Products: Fast food, cereals

Cerealicious was a fast-food restaurant and cereal cafe chain based in the Philippines. Cerealicious offered Post, Nestle, and Kellogg's cereals with milk and a wide range of additional toppings and incorporated local flavors to serve Filipino taste.

== History ==
The start up business was the brainchild of a group of students back in 2005 with the concept of reinventing cereals by adding candies and mix-ins then naming the "creation" after movie titles. On January 4, 2006, the first Cerealicious store was opened at the University of Santo Tomas campus in Sampaloc, Manila.

Aside from cereals, the business grew and had evolved to a fast food restaurant offering pasta, fries, and beverages.

== Products ==
Create-Your-Own allows customers to experiment with the assorted cereal brands with either dry or low-fat milk topped off by a variety of toppings such as nuts, fruits, cookies, and candies.

Cerealicious offers a drink made of cereals called "Cerealicious Smoothies". These are shakes that are mixed with cereals to give them a crunchy texture. They are branded as "cereal meal[s] on the go".

=== Cereal Blockbusters ===
Cerealicious offers Cereal Blockbusters, which are set combinations of cereals, milk slush, and toppings. Each is named after a hit movie. Available Blockbusters include:

- Jumanggo (Jumanji)
- Apple-O 13 (Apollo 13)
- Cashewblanca (Casablanca)
- Froot Loose (Footloose)
- Jelly Maguire (Jerry Maguire)
- Nutting Hill (Notting Hill)
- Pirates of the Cadbury-Ean (Pirates of the Caribbean)
- Oreo X Juliet (Romeo and Juliet)
- Arr-oats Caldo (Arroz caldo)
- The Gummi Returns (The Mummy Returns)
- Harry Butterfinger of Azkaban (Harry Potter and the Prisoner of Azkaban)
- Mintception (Inception)
- A Walk to ReM&Mber (A Walk to Remember)
- Mint Joe Black (Meet Joe Black)
- Erin Brocko-Peach (Erin Brockovich)
- Lemony Snickers (Lemony Snicket)
- K-Sino Royale (Casino Royale)
- My Bestfriend's Pudding (My Best Friend's Wedding)
- About A-Hoy (About a Boy)
- The K After Tomorrow (The Day After Tomorrow)
- Nerd of the Rings (The Lord of the Rings)
- Banana Jones & the Temple of Doom (Indiana Jones and the Temple of Doom)
- Charlie & The Chocnut Factory (Charlie and the Chocolate Factory)
- The Hurt Loacker (The Hurt Locker)
- Term-I-Nator (The Terminator)
- I-Rone Man (Iron Man)
- Maltey & Me (Marley & Me)
- The Karate Kit (The Karate Kid)

=== Other cereals ===
- Munchsters Inc. ("Monsters Inc.")
- Pie School Musical ("High School Musical")
- Avengers AsseM&Mble ("The Avengers")
- The Tart Knight Rises ("The Dark Knight Rises")
- Midnight In Paris ("Midnight In Paris")
- My Week With Malt-Lyn ("My Week With Marilyn")
- Sherloack Holmes ("Sherlock Holmes")
- BreaKit Dawn ("The Twilight Saga: Breaking Dawn")
- Montea Carlo ("Monte Carlo")
- Caffeine Americrunch ("Captain America: The First Avenger")
- The King's Peach ("The King's Speech")
- The Social Nutwork ("The Social Network")
- Jun-Oh! ("Juno")
- Harry Potter And The Mudpie Prince ("Harry Potter And The Half-Blood Prince")
- Harry Potter And The Deathly Mallows ("Harry Potter And The Deathly Hallows")
- Despic-Apple Me ("Despicable Me")
- Raisindent Evil ("Resident Evil")
- Grape Expectations ("Great Expectations")
- Avo-Tar ("Avatar")
- The Amazing S-Pie-Derman ("The Amazing Spider-Man")
