= Breakdown =

Breakdown may refer to:

== Breaking down ==
- Breakdown (vehicle), failure of a motor vehicle in such a way that it cannot be operated
- Chemical decomposition, also called chemical breakdown, the breakdown of a substance into simpler components
- Decomposition, the process by which tissues of a dead organism break down into simpler forms of matter
- Drop set, also called a breakdown, a bodybuilding and weight training technique
- Electrical breakdown, the failure of an electric circuit or a rapid reduction in the resistance of an electrical insulator that can lead to a spark
- Mental breakdown, an acute, time-limited phase of exhibiting symptoms of a specific disorder, most commonly, depression and anxiety
- Script breakdown, a step in the production of a play, film, or comic book

== Arts and media ==
=== Comics and games ===
- Breakdowns (comics), 1977 collection of comics by Art Spiegelman
- Breakdown (Transformers), several fictional nervous and cowardly robot supervillain characters in the Transformers robot superhero franchise debuting in 1984
- Breakdown (comics), a 2004 comic written by Chuck Dixon, and drawn by Dave Ross, about Paragon, the world's first superhero
- Breakdown (video game), a 2004 first-person action game for the Xbox, noted for unique gameplay mechanics and deeper method of storytelling

=== Film and television ===
- Breakdown (1952 film), a film noir starring Ann Richards
- The Loveless, originally titled Breakdown, a 1981 outlaw biker film starring Willem Dafoe
- Breakdown (1997 film), a thriller starring Kurt Russell
- Breakdown: In Your House, a 1998 professional wrestling pay-per-view event
- Breakdown (2016 film), a British thriller featuring a contract killer whose family is under threat
- "Breakdown", a 2019 episode of The Good Doctor

=== Music ===
- Breakdown (music), an instrumental or percussion section or interlude during a song
- Breakdown (band), a 1980s New York hardcore band

==== Albums ====
- Break Down (album), by South Korean boy band Super Junior M, 2013
- Break Down (EP), by South Korean Kim Hyun Joong of SS501, 2011
- Breakdown (Old & In the Way album), 1997
- Breakdown (Melissa Etheridge album), 1999
- Breakdown (Paulinho da Costa album), 1987

==== Songs ====
- "Breakdown" (Tom Petty and the Heartbreakers song), 1977 (later covered by Grace Jones in 1980)
- "Breakdown" (Clock DVA song), 1983
- "Breakdown" (Fu-Schnickens song), 1994
- "Breakdown" (G-Eazy song), 2021
- "Breakdown" (Group 1 Crew song), 2010
- "Breakdown" (Jack Johnson song), 2005
- "Breakdown" (Mariah Carey song), 1998
- "Breakdown (Prince Song), 2014
- "Breakdown" (Queensrÿche song), 1999
- "Breakdown" (Seether song), 2008
- "Breakdown" (Tantric song), 2001
- "Breakdown", by The Alan Parsons Project from I Robot, 1977
- "Breakdown", by Black Gold, 2008
- "Breakdown", by Breaking Benjamin from We Are Not Alone, 2004
- "Breakdown", by Daughtry from Daughtry, 2006
- "Breakdown", by Girlschool from Demolition, 1980
- "Breakdown", by Gravity Kills from Superstarved, 2002
- "Breakdown", by Guns N' Roses from Use Your Illusion II, 1991
- "Breakdown", by J. Cole from Cole World: The Sideline Story, 2011
- "Breakdown", by Lacuna Coil from Delirium, 2016
- "Breakdown", by Meg & Dia from Cocoon, 2011
- "Breakdown", by Relient K from The Anatomy of the Tongue in Cheek, 2001
- "Breakdown", by Ryan Adams from Prisoner, 2017
- "Breakdown", by The Selecter from Subculture, 2015
- "Breakdown", by Suede from Suede, 1993
- "Breakdown", by You Me at Six from Truth Decay, 2023
- "The Breakdown", by Parliament, 1971

=== Other media ===
- The Breakdown, a controversial 1926 painting about the Jazz Age
- Break Down (Landy artwork), a 2001 artwork by Michael Landy
- Breakdown: How America's Intelligence Failures Led to September 11, a 2003 book by Bill Gertz
- Breakdown, a 2016 novel by Jonathan Kellerman in the Alex Delaware series
- The Breakdown, a 2017 novel by B.A. Paris

== Other uses ==
- Breakdown (rugby union), the period of open play immediately after a tackle and before and during the ensuing ruck in Rugby Union
- Lance Hoyt (born 1977), American professional wrestler who previously used the ring name Breakdown
- Breakdown point, a measure the robustness of an estimator in robust statistics

== See also ==
- Broken Down (disambiguation)
- Breaking Down (disambiguation)
- Breaking Dawn (disambiguation)
