= Goto (food) =

Filipino rice and beef tripe gruel

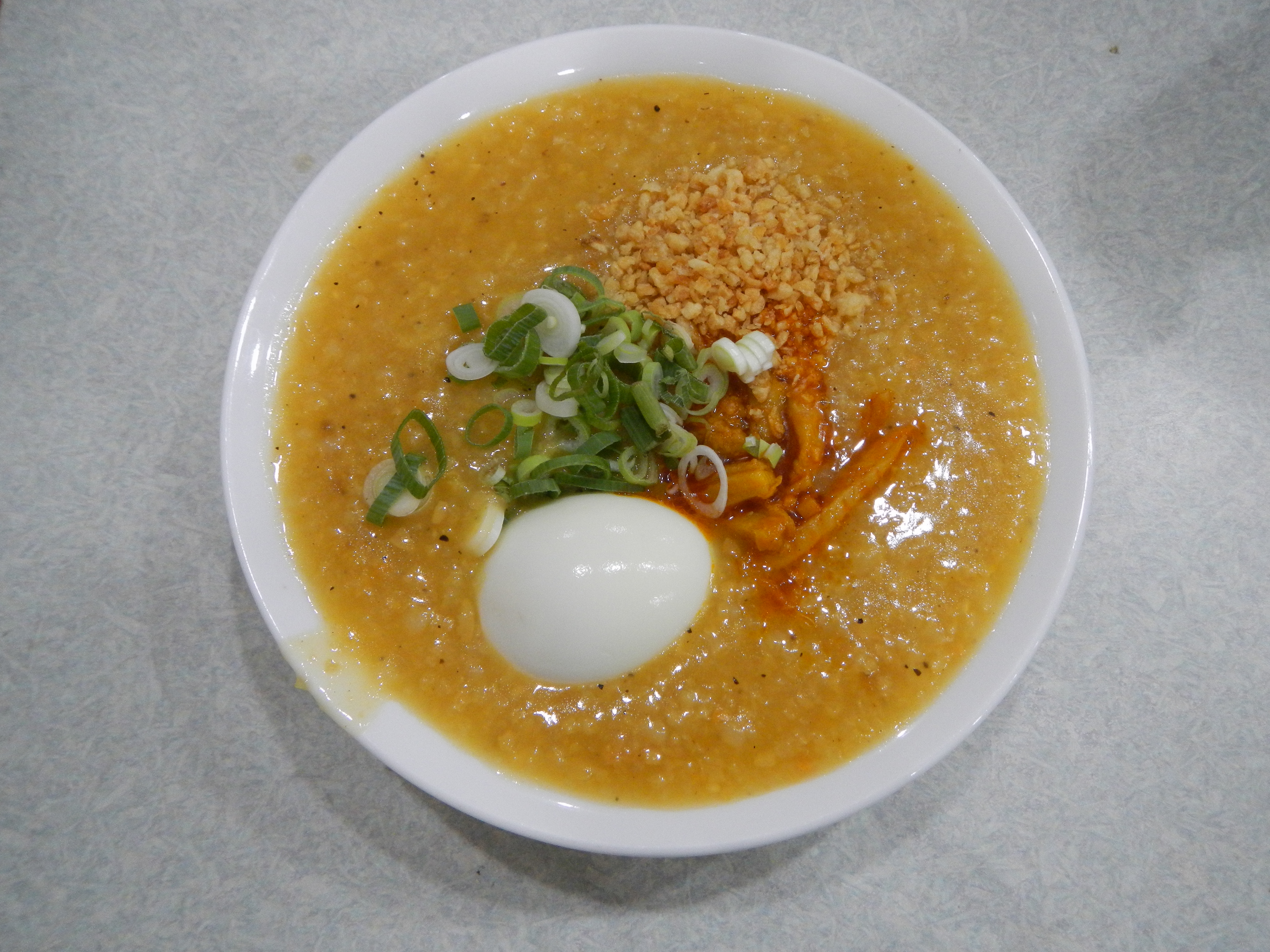
- Goto from Luna, Apayao
- Alternative names: arroz caldo con goto, arroz con goto, arroz goto, goto arroz caldo
- Course: Main dish
- Place of origin: Philippines
- Region or state: Luzon
- Serving temperature: Hot
- Main ingredients: glutinous rice, ginger, beef tripe, toasted garlic, scallions, black pepper, chicharon
- Similar dishes: arroz caldo, pospas, lugaw, Congee

Goto, also known as arroz caldo con goto, is a Filipino rice and beef tripe gruel cooked with ginger and garnished with toasted garlic, scallions, black pepper, and chicharon. It is usually served with calamansi, soy sauce, or fish sauce (patis) as condiments, as well as a hard-boiled egg. It is a type of lugaw.

== Etymology ==
The original complete name of the dish is arroz caldo con goto or arroz con goto, derived from Spanish arroz ("rice") and caldo ("soup"); as well as Tagalog goto ("tripe"). Tagalog goto, ultimately derives from Hokkien 牛肚 (gû-tǒ͘, "ox tripe").

== Description ==
Goto typically uses glutinous rice (malagkit), but can also be made with regular rice boiled with an excess of water. It is prepared almost identically to arroz caldo. Rice is cooked with water infused with ginger, then garnished with toasted garlic, scallions, black pepper, and crumbled chicharon. They are served on individual bowls while hot. The tripe is cooked separately until very tender. They are typically cut into longitudinal strips before being added into the rice, along with a hard-boiled egg. Beef tripe can be substituted with other offal, like pig intestines (isaw ng baboy).

Safflower (kasubha) may be added to give the dish a yellow color, though it is not traditional unlike in arroz caldo. It is commonly paired with tokwa't baboy (cubed tofu and pork). It is usually served with calamansi, soy sauce, or fish sauce (patis) as condiments. Goto is typically served as breakfast or as hangover food.

== See also ==
- Bubur ayam
- Ginataang mais
