= Breaking Down (disambiguation) =

"Breaking Down" is a song by I Prevail from Trauma.

Breaking Down may also refer to:

- "Breaking Down", a song by Ailee from the original soundtrack of Doom at Your Service
- "Breaking Down", a song by the Black Keys from Let's Rock
- "Breaking Down", a song by Florence + the Machine from Ceremonials
- "Breaking Down", a song by the Mighty Lemon Drops from World Without End
- "Breaking Down", a song by Trust Company from True Parallels
- "Breakin' Down", a song by Skid Row from Subhuman Race
- "Breakin' Down (Sugar Samba)", a 1984 song by Julia & Company

== See also ==
- Breakdown (disambiguation)
- Broken Down (disambiguation)
