= Arroz caldo =

Philippine rice and chicken gruel

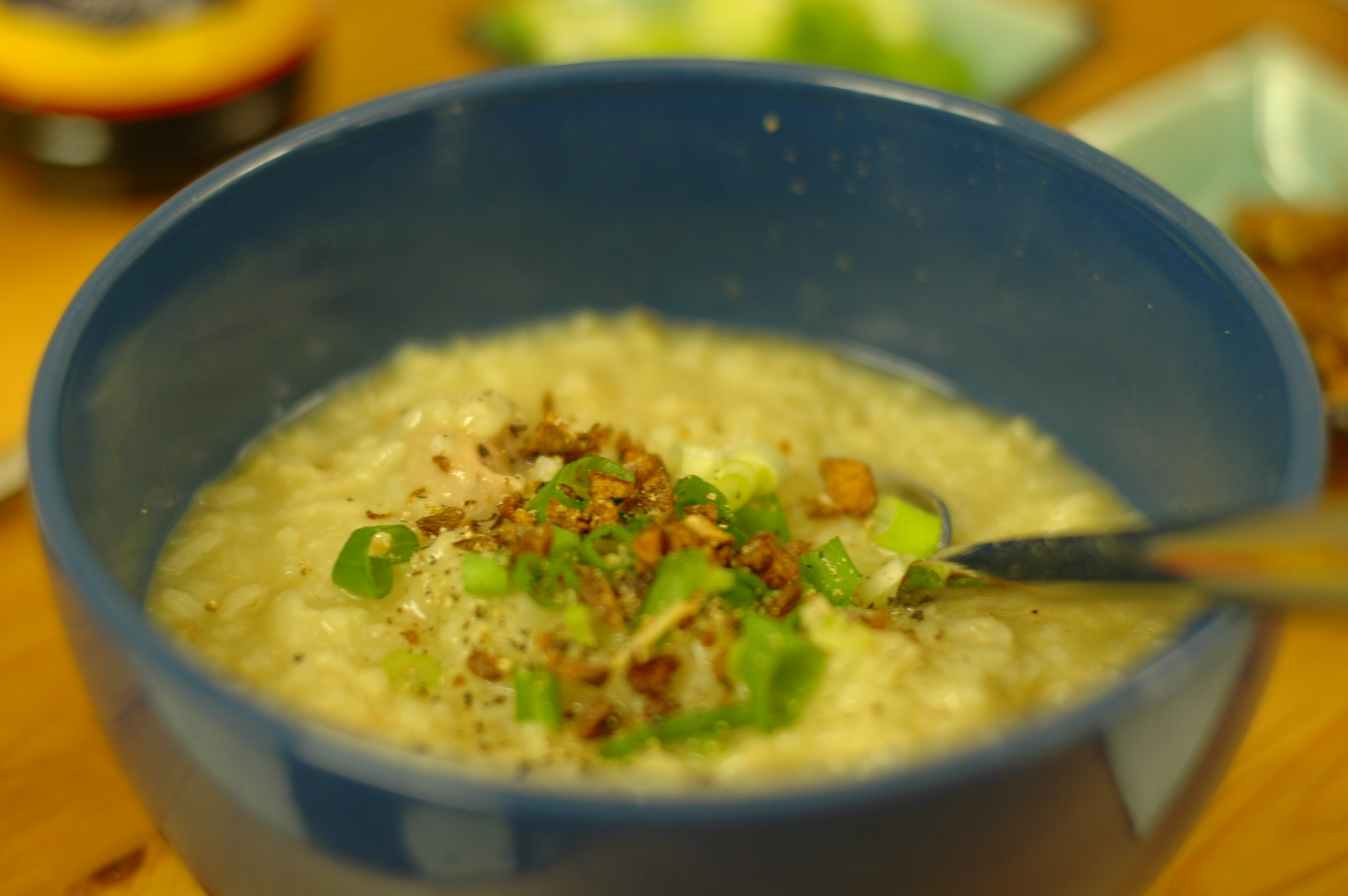
- Chicken arroz caldo with kasubha
- Alternative names: Aroskaldo, caldo de arroz, arroz caldo con pollo, arroz caldoso, chicken arroz caldo, chicken pospas
- Course: Main dish
- Place of origin: Spain
- Region or state: Luzon
- Serving temperature: Hot
- Main ingredients: glutinous rice, ginger, chicken, toasted garlic, scallions, black pepper, safflower
- Variations: Pospas
- Similar dishes: Goto, lugaw, congee

Arroz caldo is a Filipino dish made of rice and chicken gruel, heavily infused with ginger, and garnished with toasted garlic, scallions, and black pepper. It is usually served with calamansi or fish sauce (Tagalog: patis) as condiments, as well as a hard-boiled egg. Most versions also add safflower (kasubha) which turns the dish characteristically yellow. Arroz caldo is also known as pospas in Visayan regions, though pospas has slightly different ingredients.

Arroz caldo is a type of lugaw, a Philippine rice porridge dish. It is regarded as a comfort food in Philippine culture and is a popular breakfast meal.

== Etymology ==
The Spanish name arroz caldo is translated as "rice broth". It originally referred to all types of rice gruels (Tagalog: lugaw), but has come to refer to a specific type of lugaw that uses chicken and is heavily infused with ginger.

Arroz caldo is derived from the Spanish brothy rice dish arroz caldoso. A similar local derivative dish known as "Lugaw" or congee was introduced by Chinese migrants. It has diverged over the centuries to use Filipino ingredients and suit local tastes.

== Description ==
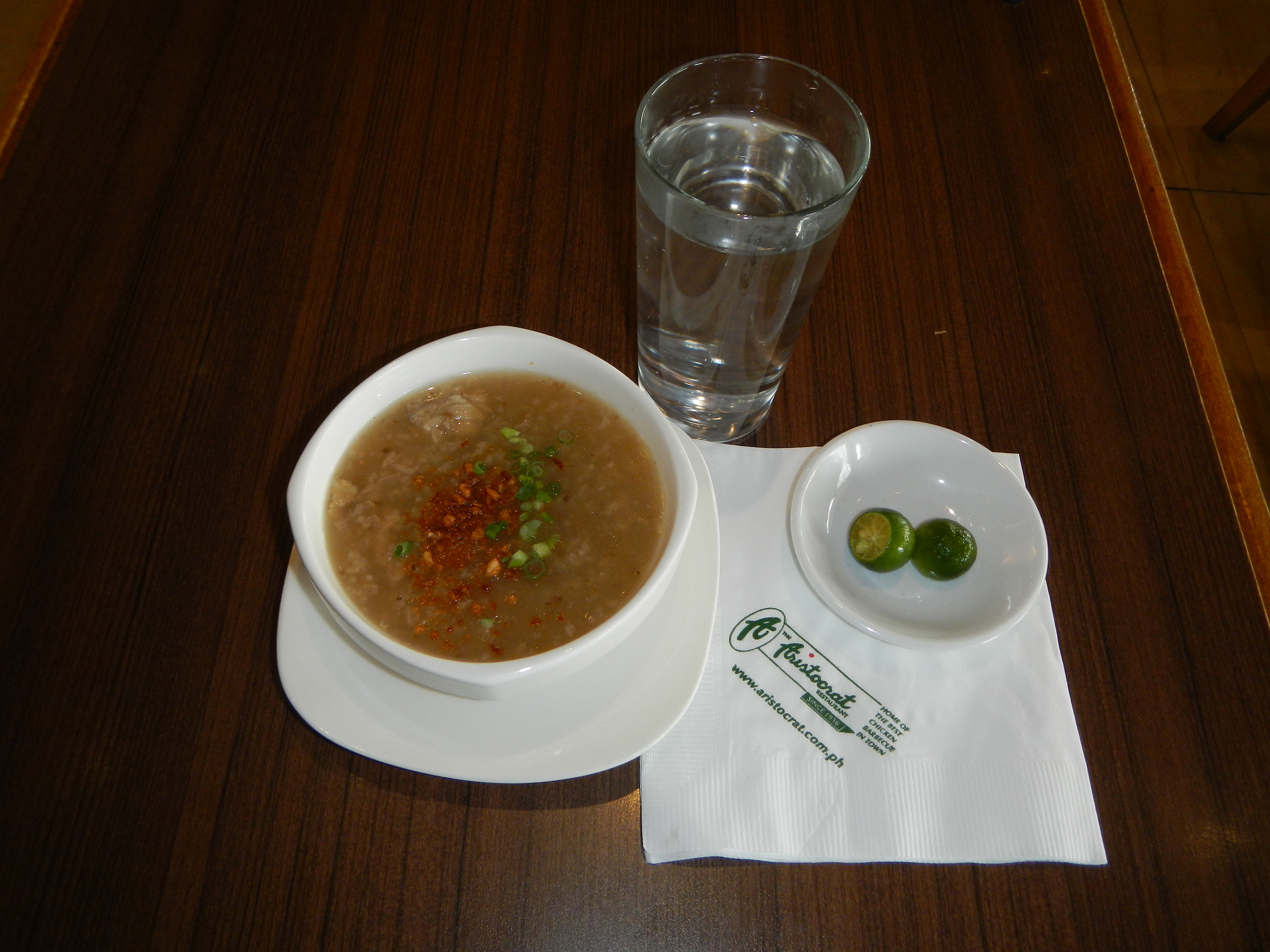
Arroz caldo is commonly served with calamansi

Arroz caldo typically uses glutinous rice (malagkit), but it can also be made with regular rice boiled with an excess of water. The chicken pieces are usually cooked first in a broth with a large amount of ginger. The chicken is taken out and shredded once tender then re-added along with the rice. The rice is continually stirred while cooking to prevent it from sticking to the pot. The characteristic yellow color of the dish is due to the addition of safflower (kasubha). In more expensive versions, saffron may be used instead to further enhance the flavor. When neither are available, some versions substitute turmeric instead.

Arroz caldo is served in individual bowls with a single hard-boiled egg. It is garnished with toasted garlic, chopped scallions, and black pepper. Crumbled chicaron can also be added to augment the texture and taste. While arroz caldo is very fragrant, it is usually quite bland in taste and needs to be seasoned further with various condiments, most commonly calamansi and fish sauce (patis). Lime or lemon may be substituted for calamansi.

Arroz caldo is regarded as a comfort food in Filipino cuisine. It is usually eaten for breakfast, during colder months, during rainy weather, and by people who are sick or bedridden. The dish is eaten hot or warm, since it congeals if left to cool. It can be reheated by adding a little bit of water.

Philippine Airlines is known particularly for its arroz caldo, reportedly a favorite of President Corazon Aquino.

== Variants ==
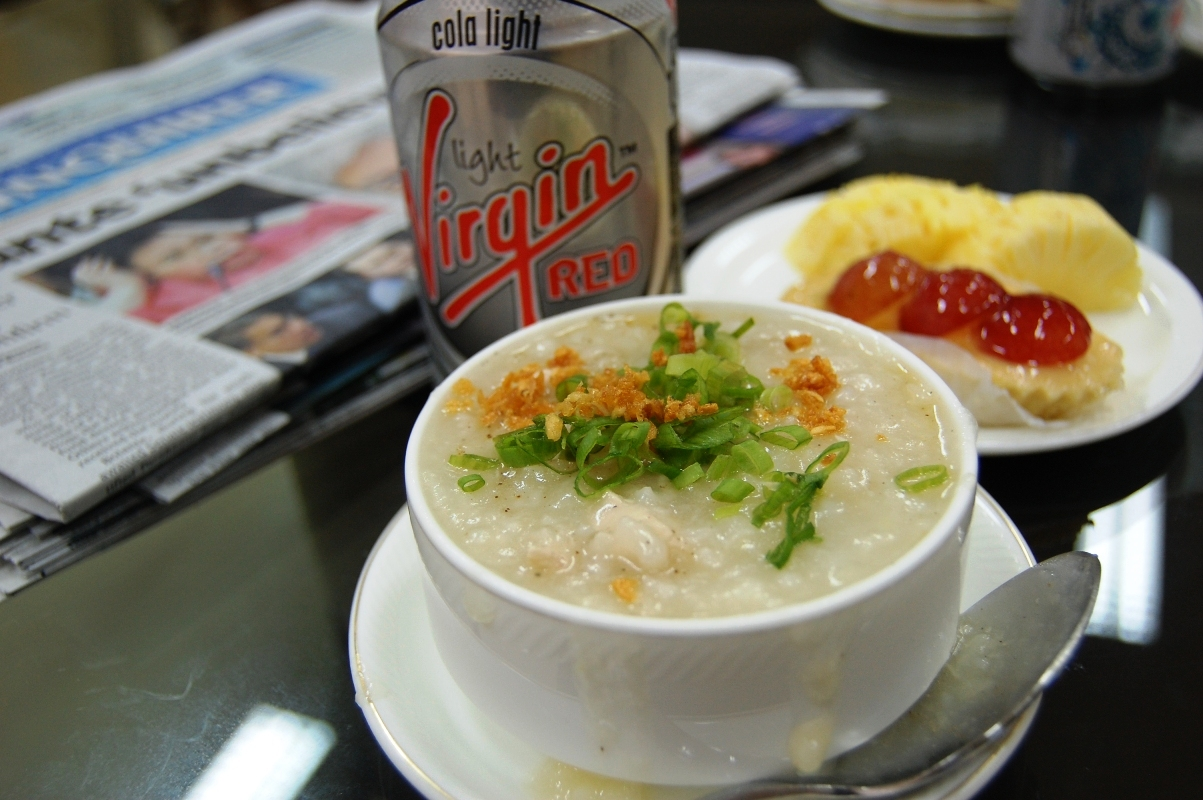
Visayan chicken pospas from Cebu without the safflower

In Visayan regions, savory lugaw is known as pospas. Chicken pospas is regarded as the direct equivalent of arroz caldo. However, unlike arroz caldo, pospas traditionally does not use safflower.

A much rarer variant of arroz caldo is arroz caldong palaka, which uses frog legs (palaka is Tagalog for "frog"). Non-traditional variants include vegan versions, which use mushrooms or tofu instead of meat.

Goto is closely related to arroz caldo, but it is regarded as a different type of lugaw since it does not rely heavily on ginger. It is prepared similarly to arroz caldo but uses beef tripe that has been soaked and boiled for hours until very tender. It is also known as arroz caldo con goto or arroz con goto, from Tagalog goto ("tripe").

== See also ==
- Bubur ayam
- Ginataang mais
