= Training to failure =

Weight training technique

In weight training, training to failure is repeating an exercise to the point of momentary muscular failure, i.e. the point where the neuromuscular system can no longer produce adequate force to overcome a specific workload. Two systematic reviews published in 2021 found no benefit to training to failure on hypertrophy, while one of the reviews found some evidence that not-to-failure training is superior for strength.

== Initial failure ==
When the athlete has reached initial failure (i.e. fails to perform a further repetition), rather than ending the current set, the exercise can be continued by making the exercise easier (switching to another similar exercise e.g. pull-ups to chin-ups, switching to another (correct) form of the same exercise, switching to lower weight) or by recruiting help (from a spotting partner or by involving another body part). The athlete may also choose to use the rest-pause method or other advanced techniques.

== Repetition maximum ==
A repetition maximum (RM) is the maximum weight a person can lift for the indicated number of repetitions. For example, a 10RM is the weight at which a person can do 10 lifts, but fail to fully perform the 11th. Similarly, a 1RM, or one-repetition maximum, is the most a person can fully lift (at least) once.

Determining a repetition maximum must be done to true failure – by definition, it represents the weight and repetition count at which the person reaches failure, and can no longer lift. Therefore, this also can be considered a form of training to failure. Though 1RM is the most popular and commonly used, any number of repetitions can be used, such as 10RM or 15RM.

A 10RM weight is more useful in terms of training for hypertrophy than a 1RM. There is less consensus as to why a 10RM is actually safer; it may be because a 10RM can be performed with a much lower risk of joint injury (due to the lower weight), but also potentially because failure occurs due to absolute inability of the muscles to perform at the attempted weight (rather than due to fatigue).

== Types of failure ==
There are multiple types of failure that can be reached before ending a set. They are listed here in order of increasing intensity.

- Pre-failure: The set is ended just before failure, as judged based on sensory feedback from the muscles and joints (proprioception).
- Tempo failure: The tempo or cadence used for the initial few repetitions can no longer be maintained. Additional repetitions cannot be performed at the same tempo.
- Form failure: Proper form or technique for repetitions can no longer be maintained. Additional repetitions cannot be performed using proper form.

When determining repetition maximum, form failure should be used. Training past form failure can cause joint and muscle injury and should never be attempted. Beginners should train to pre-failure or tempo failure, while focusing on maintaining proper form.
