= Lugaw =

Rice porridge dish in the Philippines

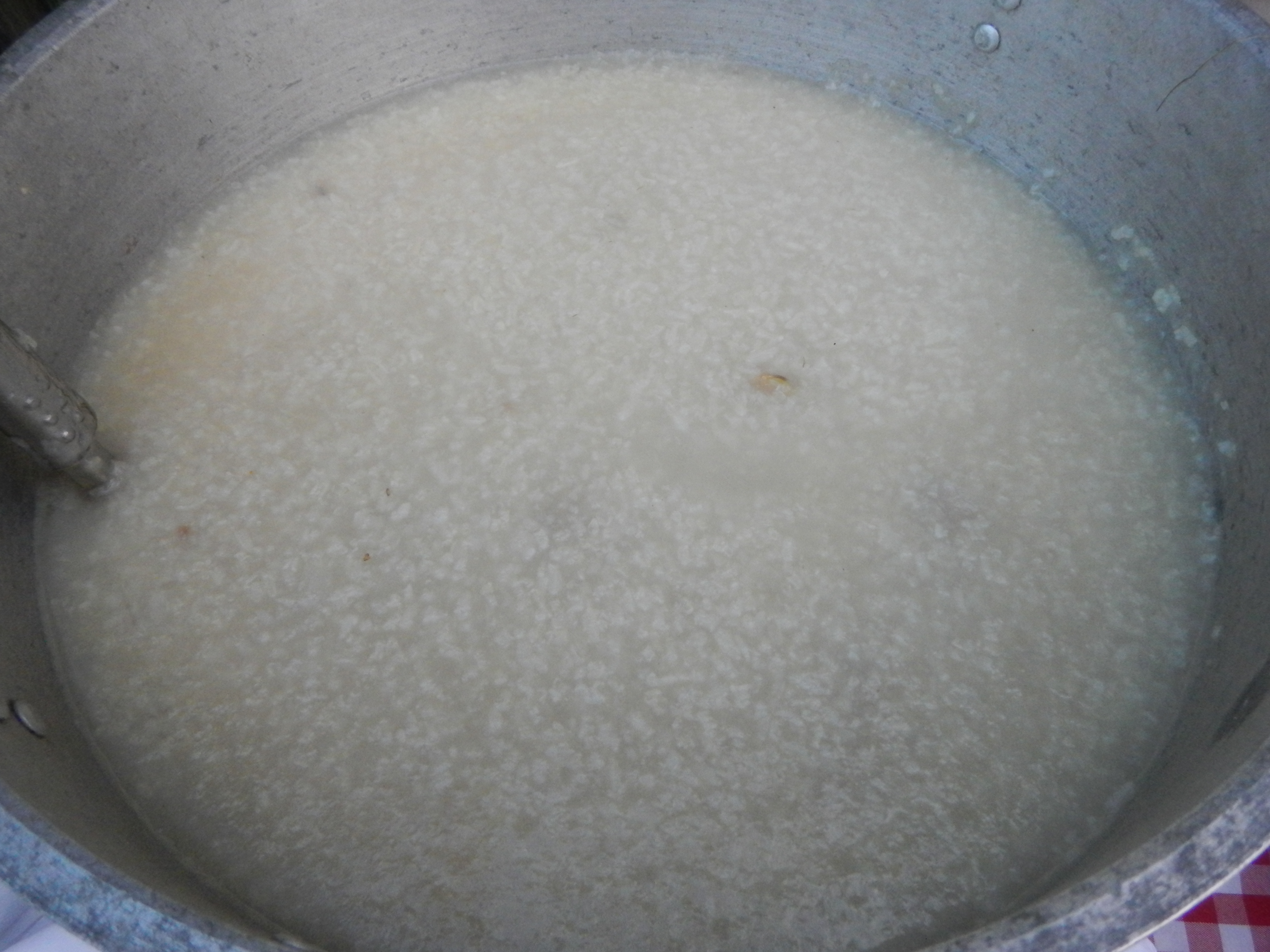
- Basic lugaw
- Alternative names: pospas, lugao
- Course: Main dish
- Place of origin: Philippines
- Main ingredients: glutinous rice
- Variations: arroz caldo, goto
- Similar dishes: Congee

Lugaw, also spelled lugao, is a Filipino glutinous rice dish or porridge. Lugaw may refer to various dishes, both savory and sweet. In Visayan regions, savory lugaw are collectively referred to as pospas. Lugaw is widely regarded as a comfort food in the Philippines.

== History ==
According to the National Commission for Culture and the Arts, lugaw is one of the earliest historically documented dishes in the Philippines. The Vocabulario de la lengua tagala (1613) by Fr. Pedro de San Buenaventura defines "logao" (Hispanized as "aroz guisado") as "rice mixed with [coconut] milk or water or of both (porridge)."

== Description ==
Lugaw is traditionally made by boiling glutinous rice (Ilocano: diket ;Tagalog: malagkit; Visayan: pilit). Regular white rice may also be used if boiled with excess water. The basic version is sparsely spiced, usually only using salt, garlic, and ginger; or alternatively, sugar. Heartier versions are cooked in chicken, fish, pork or beef broth. It is regarded as a comforting and easy-to-digest food, typically prepared for breakfast and during cold and rainy weather. It is also commonly served to people who are sick or bedridden, and to very young children and the elderly.

Lugaw is usually eaten hot or warm, since the gruel congeals if left to cool. It can be reheated by adding a little bit of water. Dessert versions can be eaten cold or even partly frozen.

== Variants ==
Lugaw can be paired or augmented with numerous other dishes and ingredients.

=== Savory ===
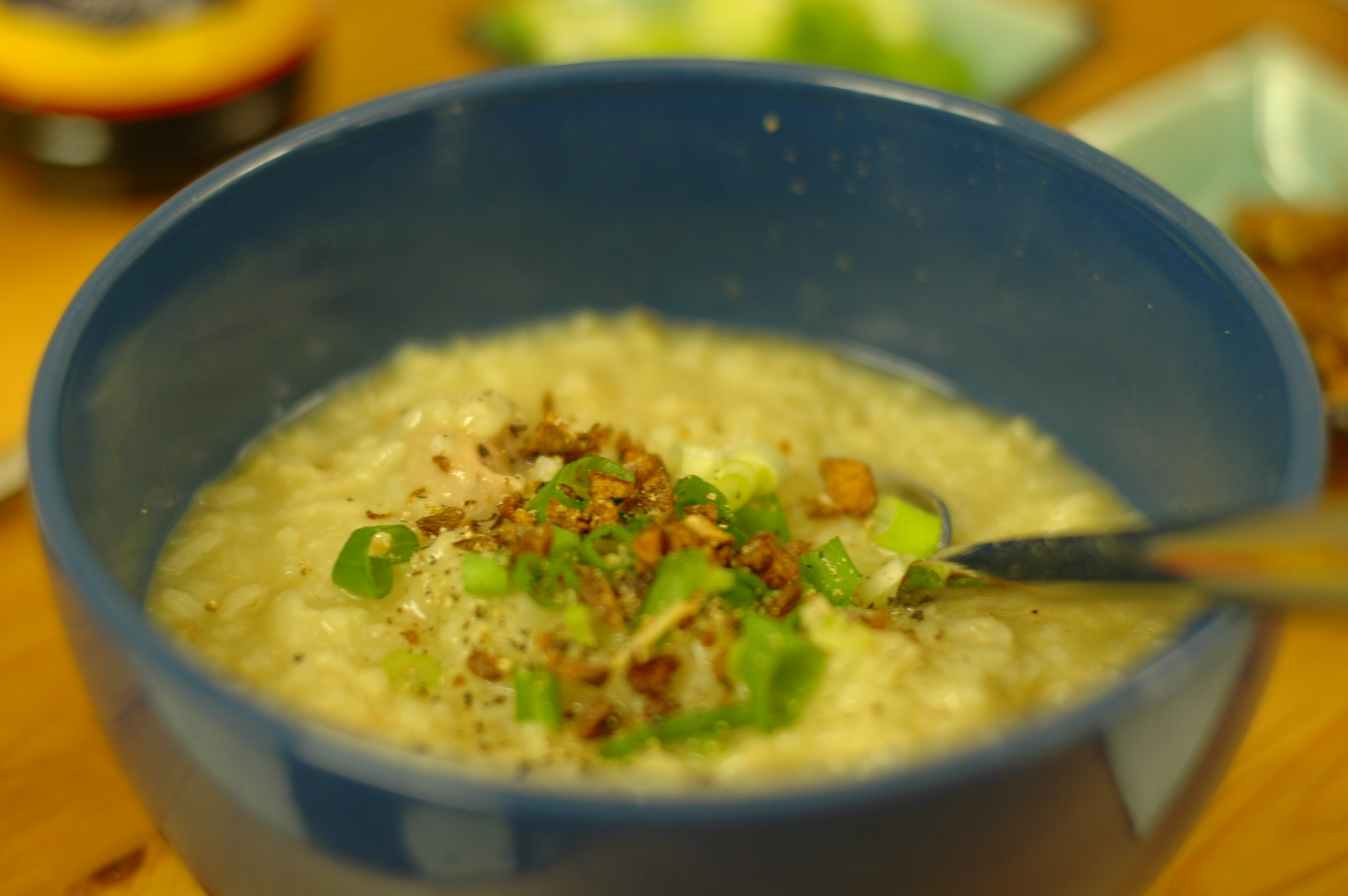
Chicken arroz caldo with safflower (kasubha)

Most savory versions of lugaw are derived from or influenced by Chinese-style congee, introduced by Chinese-Filipino migrants. It has diverged over the centuries to use Filipino ingredients and suit the local tastes. Filipino savory lugaw are typically thicker than other Asian congees because they use glutinous rice. They are traditionally served with calamansi, soy sauce (toyo), or fish sauce (patis) as condiments Savory lugaw are usually paired with meat or seafood dishes. The most common is tokwa't baboy (cubed tofu and pork).

- Arroz caldo – lugaw heavily infused with ginger and garnished with toasted garlic, scallions, and black pepper with a hard-boiled egg. Most versions also add safflower (kasubha) which turns the dish characteristically yellow.
- Goto – lugaw made with goto (tripe) and ginger. It is garnished with toasted garlic, scallions, and black pepper. Best served with egg, toasted garlic, and chicharon.

=== Sweet ===
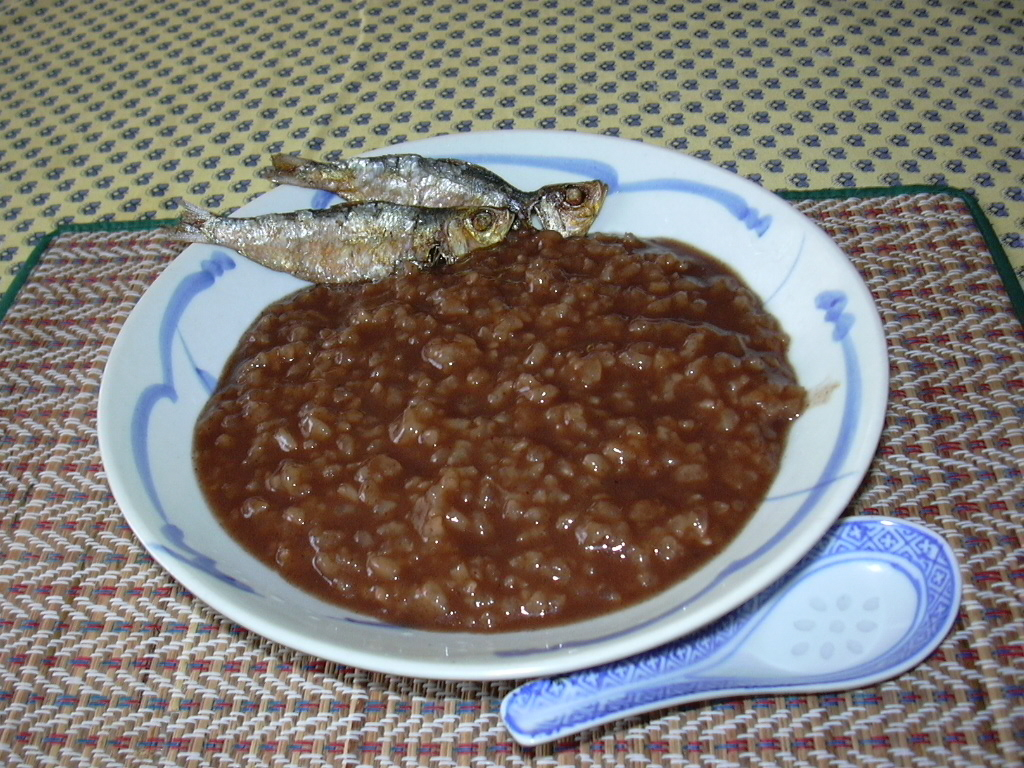
Champorado with dried fish (tuyo)

Sweet versions of lugaw are more characteristically Filipino. They include:

- Binignit – lugaw made with coconut milk (gata) and various slices of fruit, jelly desserts (like sago, tapioca pearls, kaong, etc.), and root crops (like sweet potato, taro, and ube). It is known by many other regional names, like giná-tan, tabirák, alpahor, ginettaán, ginat-ang lugaw, and kamlo.
- Champorado – lugaw made with native chocolate. The level of sweetness varies with preference. It is a native adaptation of the Mexican drink champurrado. It is traditionally paired with crispy fried dried salted fish (daing, often tuyo or dilis) and/or condensed or evaporated milk , and served as the main rice dish like savory types of lugaw, but can be eaten without the dried fish accompaniment as a dessert depending on how sweet it is.
- Ginataang mais – lugaw made with coconut milk and sweet corn.
- Ginataang munggo – lugaw with toasted mung beans, sugar, and coconut milk. Corn may also be added.

== Use as a political symbol ==
Lugaw has been widely associated with the political camp of Philippine Vice President Leni Robredo, originating from her 2016 election campaign during which Robredo's supporters sold the rice porridge as part of a fundraising effort. Robredo's detractors and internet trolls have pejoratively used the tags "Leni Lugaw" or the "Lugaw Queen" after photos of her serving lugaw circulated online, playing on the classist connotation of lugaw as low-class insubstantial food. In response, Robredo has since adopted the tag during political events and campaigns, including serving lugaw to attendees of her 2022 Philippine presidential election bid announcement, while her supporters question the derogatory use due to lugaw being a common comfort food in Philippine culture.

== See also ==
- Filipino cuisine
  - Filipino Chinese cuisine
- List of rice dishes

Other Philippine rice cooking techniques:

- Sinangag
- Bringhe
- Kiampong
- Kuning
  - Sinigapuna
  - Ginataan
