= Arroz caldoso =

Spanish rice dish

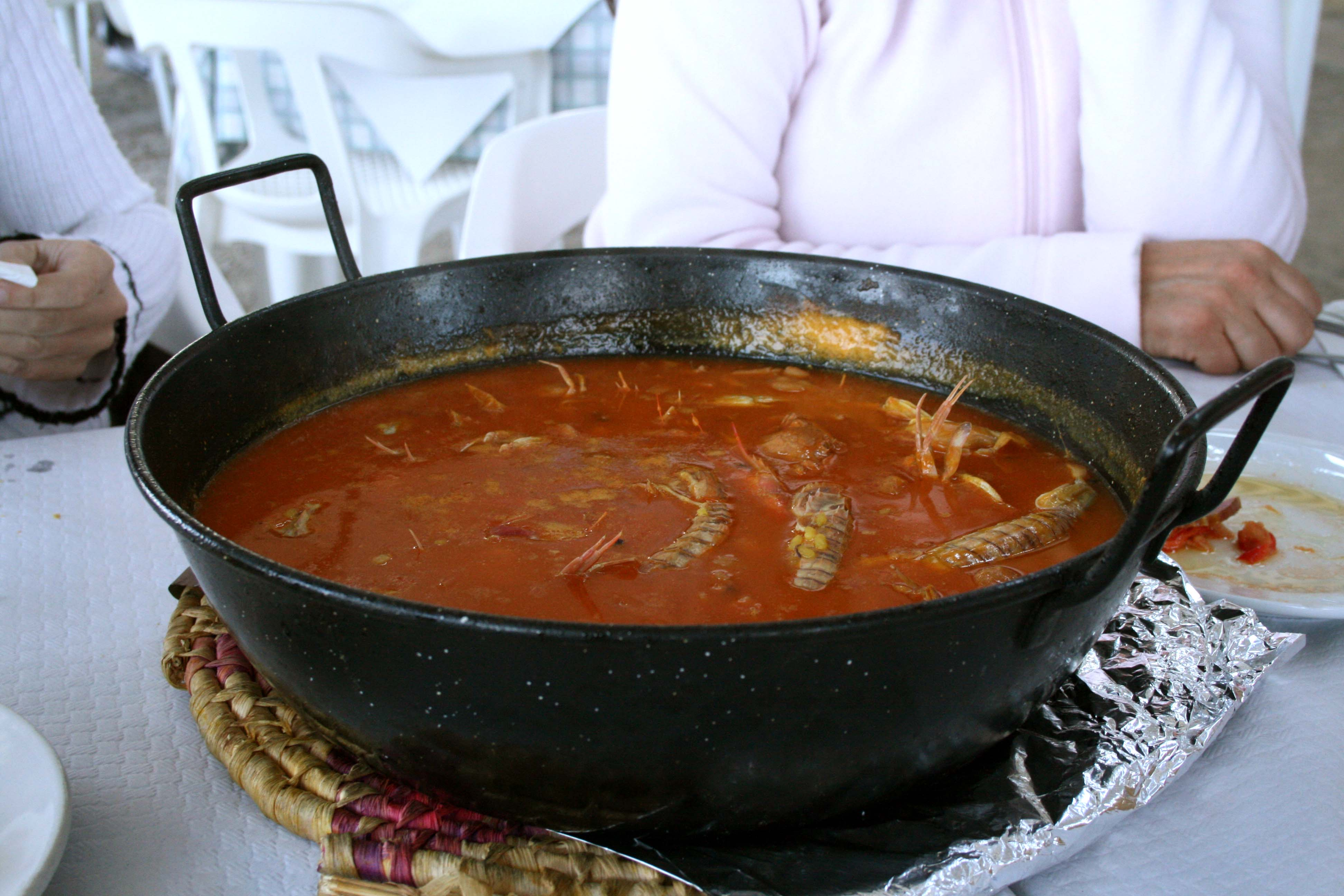
Preparing a shrimp arroz caldoso; unlike a paella, the pan is deep.

Arroz caldoso is a dish which originated in Spain. It literally means "brothy rice" and consists of broth (stock) and rice with diverse flavourings and extra ingredients. The recipe varies by region of the Iberian Peninsula, ranging from a dish similar to Italian risotto, to a rice soup, to a dish strongly resembling paella.

== Base components ==
Arroz caldoso always contains broth of any meat, some garlic or onions, and short-grained rice. Many recipes call for caramelised onions and in some recipes a small quantity of lentils are added to help thicken the caldoso and add flavour.

== Arroz caldoso with seafood ==
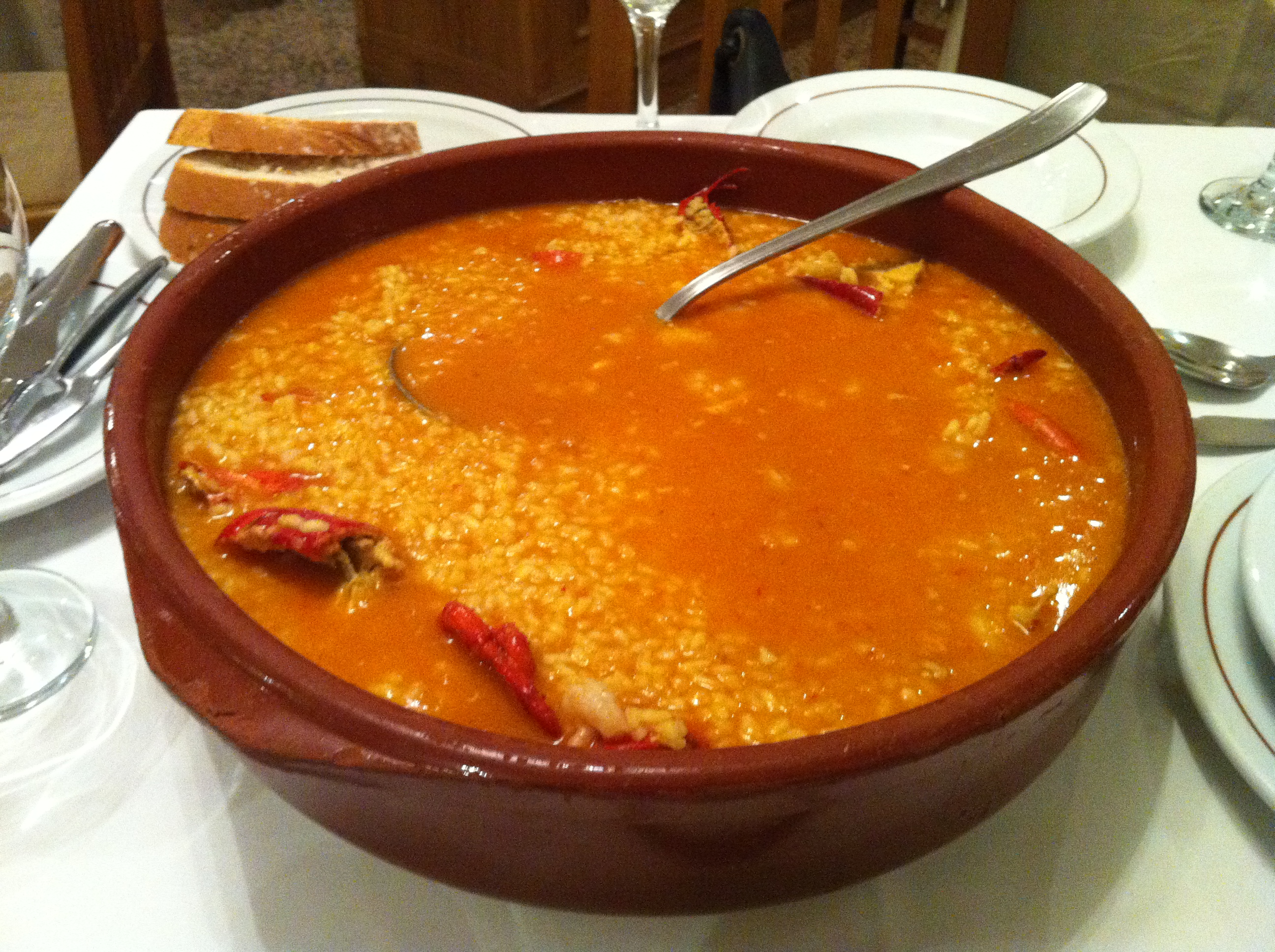
Lobster arroz caldoso in an earthenware dish

This version calls for the addition of smoked paprika (pimenton) and seafood (usually mussels, shrimp or clams) and extra water, which leaves it in a semi-liquid state. When served, the seafood is presented on top of the rice.

== Arroz caldoso with meat ==
Cubes of meat are added to the rice along with extra liquid (water or sherry) and smoked paprika or other spices.

== See also ==
- Arroz caldo
