= Broken Down =

Broken Down may refer to:

- Broken Down: The EP, a 2003 hard rock album
- Broken Down (Mest album), a 2014 album by Mest
- "Broken Down" (song), a 2003 song by alternative metal band Sevendust
- "Empire State of Mind (Part II) Broken Down", a 2009 song by Alicia Keys
- "Broken Down", a 2001 song by Eric Clapton from Reptile

== See also ==
- Breakdown (disambiguation)
