= Drop set =

Bodybuilding and weight training technique

In bodybuilding and weight training, using drop sets (a.k.a. dropsets, descending sets, strip sets, the multi-poundage system the stripping method, triple-drops, down the rack, or running the rack) is a technique for continuing an exercise with a lower weight once muscle failure has been achieved at a higher weight. It is most often performed on weight machines because the weight is easier to switch, but it can also be performed with dumbbells and other free weights.

== History ==
The approach of reducing resistance during sets was described in the late 1940s by Henry Atkins, editor of Body Culture magazine, who called it the multi-poundage system. In the 1980s, drop sets formed part of Joe Weider's Weider System.

== Example ==
While performing a biceps curl, the person lifting the weight would start with a 25 pound dumbbell and do as many repetitions as possible without significantly compromising form. Then a 20-pound weight would be used until exhaustion is reached. One could continue to "drop" down as many times as they wish, but usually the weight is not dropped to below fifty percent of their one rep maximum.

== Variations ==
There are many variations possible while using the same basic concept of reducing the weight used. One way is to do a specified number of repetitions at each weight (without necessarily reaching the point of muscle failure) with an increase in the number of repetitions each time the weight is reduced. The amount or percentage of weight reduced at each step is also one aspect of the method with much variety. A wide drop set method is one in which a large percentage (usually 30% or more) of the starting weight is shed with each weight reduction. A tight drop set would remove anywhere from 10% to 25%.

Drop sets may be performed either with or without rest periods between sets. Some make a distinction between the two: if the lifter does not rest then these sets are referred to as drop sets, whereas if the lifter does rest between sets then these sets are usually referred to as down sets.

These definitions are somewhat arbitrary, of course, and not everyone will agree on the exact definitions.

== Effects ==
Drop sets have been shown to increase muscle hypertrophy (growth) better than the traditional three-set training.

In adults in their 50s, 12 weeks of drop-set training conducted thrice-weekly can improve muscle mass, muscle strength, muscle endurance and tasks of functionality.

Drop set usage can increase the hypertrophic response to resistance training.

Some researchers have reported mixed or inconclusive findings.

== Other names ==
Drop sets and the technique also go by the names breakdowns, burnouts, descending sets, triple-drops (when a total of three different weights are used), down the rack or running the rack (when using dumbbells), up the stack (because with a weight machine, the pin is moved up the stack of plates with each drop in weight), strip sets (when you "strip" weights off the ends of a bar), or the stripping technique (so called because of "stripping" weight plates off with each drop in weight).
