= Bubur ayam =

Indonesian and Malay chicken and rice porridge

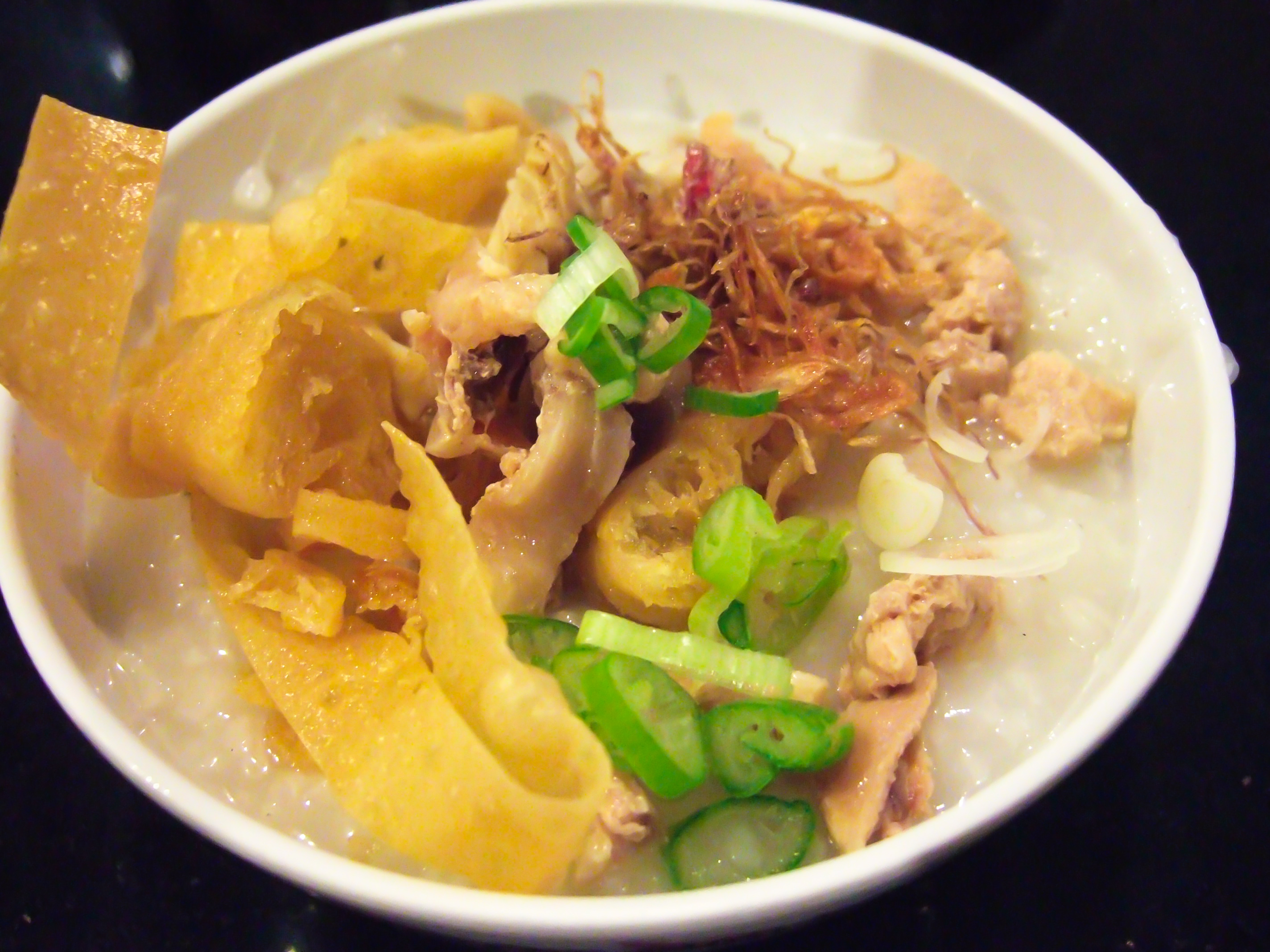
- Bubur ayam, Indonesian and Malay chicken congee
- Course: Main, usually for breakfast or late night supper
- Place of origin: Indonesia
- Region or state: Nationwide
- Serving temperature: Hot
- Main ingredients: Rice congee with chicken

Bubur ayam (Indonesian and Malay for "chicken congee") is an Indonesian and Malay version of chicken congee. It is rice congee with shredded chicken meat served with some condiments, such as chopped scallion, crispy fried shallot, celery, tongcay or chai poh (preserved vegetables), fried soybean, crullers (youtiao, known as cakwe in Indonesia), both salty and sweet soy sauce, and sometimes topped with yellow chicken broth and kerupuk (Indonesian-style crackers). Unlike many other Indonesian dishes, the dish is not spicy as the sambal or chilli paste is often served separately. It is a favourite breakfast food, served by humble travelling vendors, warung (small local shops), fast food establishments, and five-star hotel restaurants. Travelling bubur ayam vendors frequently pass through residential streets in the morning selling the dish.

== Origin and variations ==
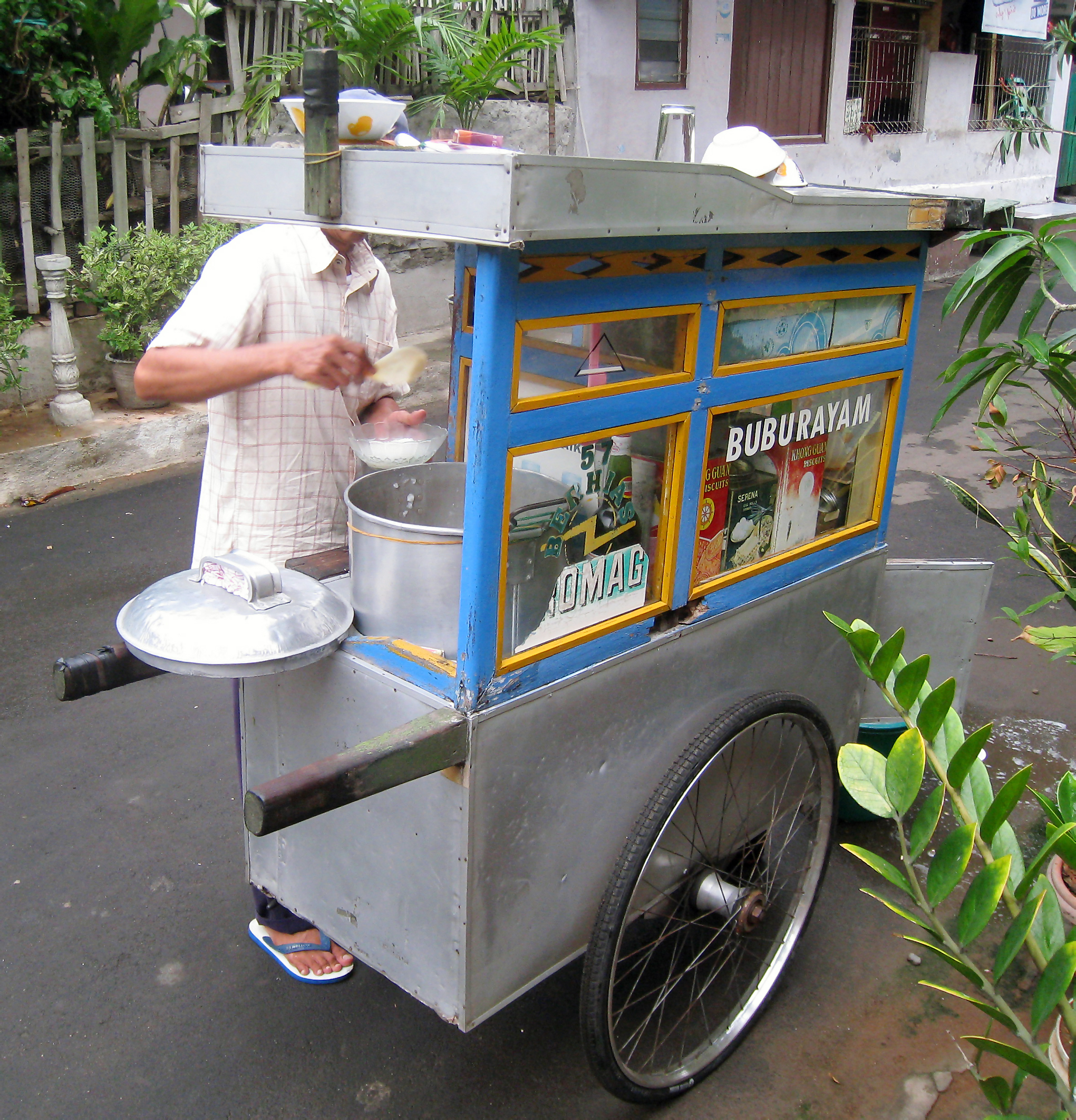
A bubur ayam street vendor cart frequents residential areas every morning in Jakarta.

The origin of bubur ayam was derived from Chinese chicken congee, but it employs regionally available ingredients and toppings to create an authentic Indonesian dish. The traces of Chinese cuisine influences are the use of cakwe (youtiao), tongcay or chai poh and soy sauce. Bubur ayam employs a wide range of poultry products, such as shredded chicken meat for the main dish and many other dishes made with chicken offal as side delicacies. Bubur ayam is often eaten with the addition of boiled chicken egg, chicken liver, gizzard, intestines and uritan (premature chicken eggs acquired from butchered hens), served as satay. There are some variants of bubur ayam, such as bubur ayam Bandung and bubur ayam Sukabumi, both from West Java. The later variant uses raw telur ayam kampung (lit. "village chicken egg", i.e. free-range eggs) buried under the hot rice congee to allow the egg to be half-cooked, with the other ingredients on top of the rice congee. The recipe and condiments of bubur ayam served by travelling vendors and warung are also slightly different from those served in fast food establishments or hotel restaurants.

Because this food is always served hot and with a soft texture, like soto ayam and nasi tim, bubur ayam is known as comfort food in Indonesian culture. The soft texture of the rice congee and boneless chicken also makes this dish suitable for young children or adults in convalescence. Because of its popularity, bubur ayam has become one of the Asia-inspired fast food menu items at McDonald's Indonesia and Malaysia, and also at Kentucky Fried Chicken Indonesia. Although almost all recipes of bubur ayam use rice, a new variation, called bubur ayam havermut, replaces rice with oats. In grocery stores, bubur ayam is also available as instant food, requiring only the addition of hot water.

== Gallery ==
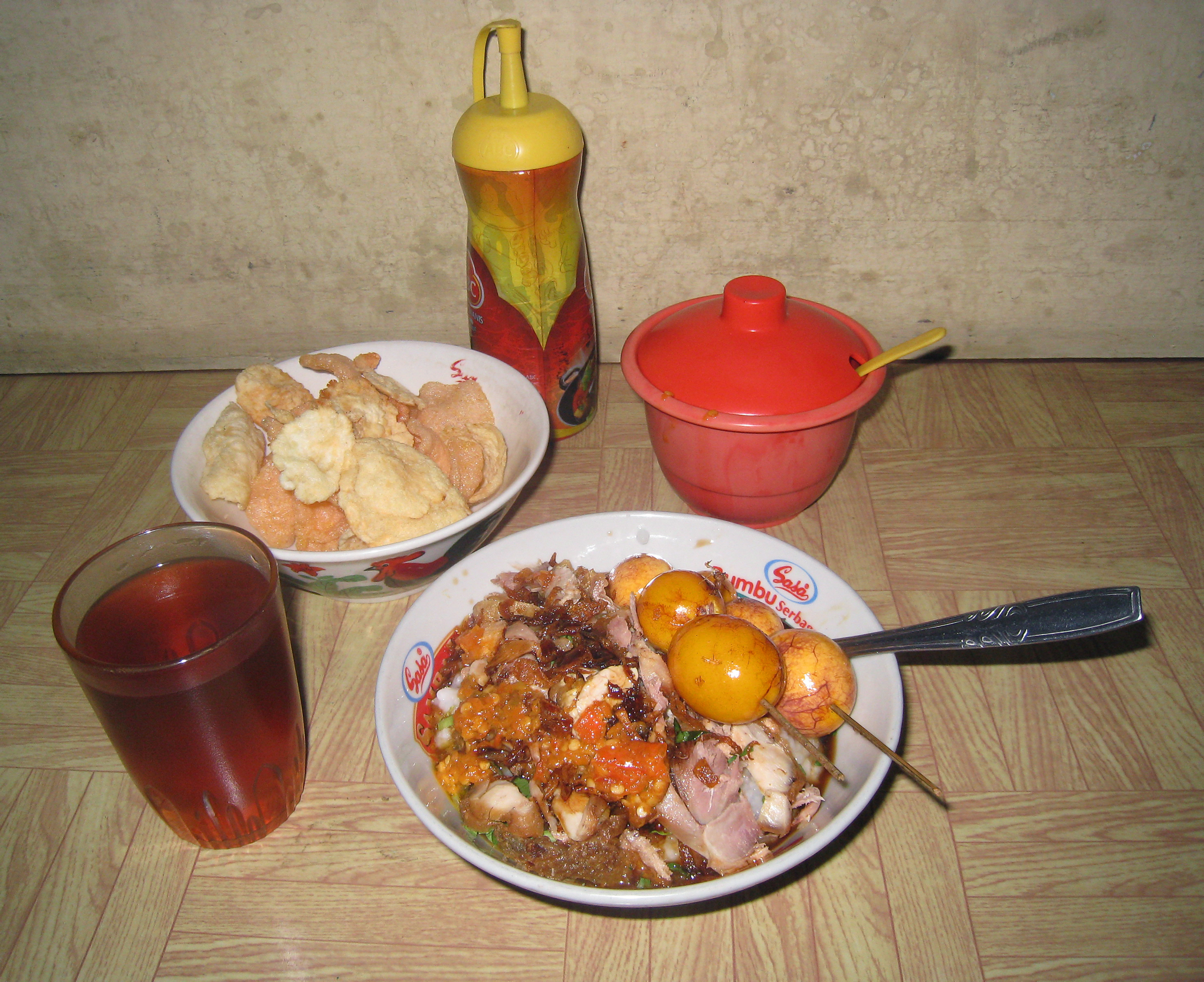
Bubur ayam with premature chicken egg satay, sold in a warung in Jakarta.

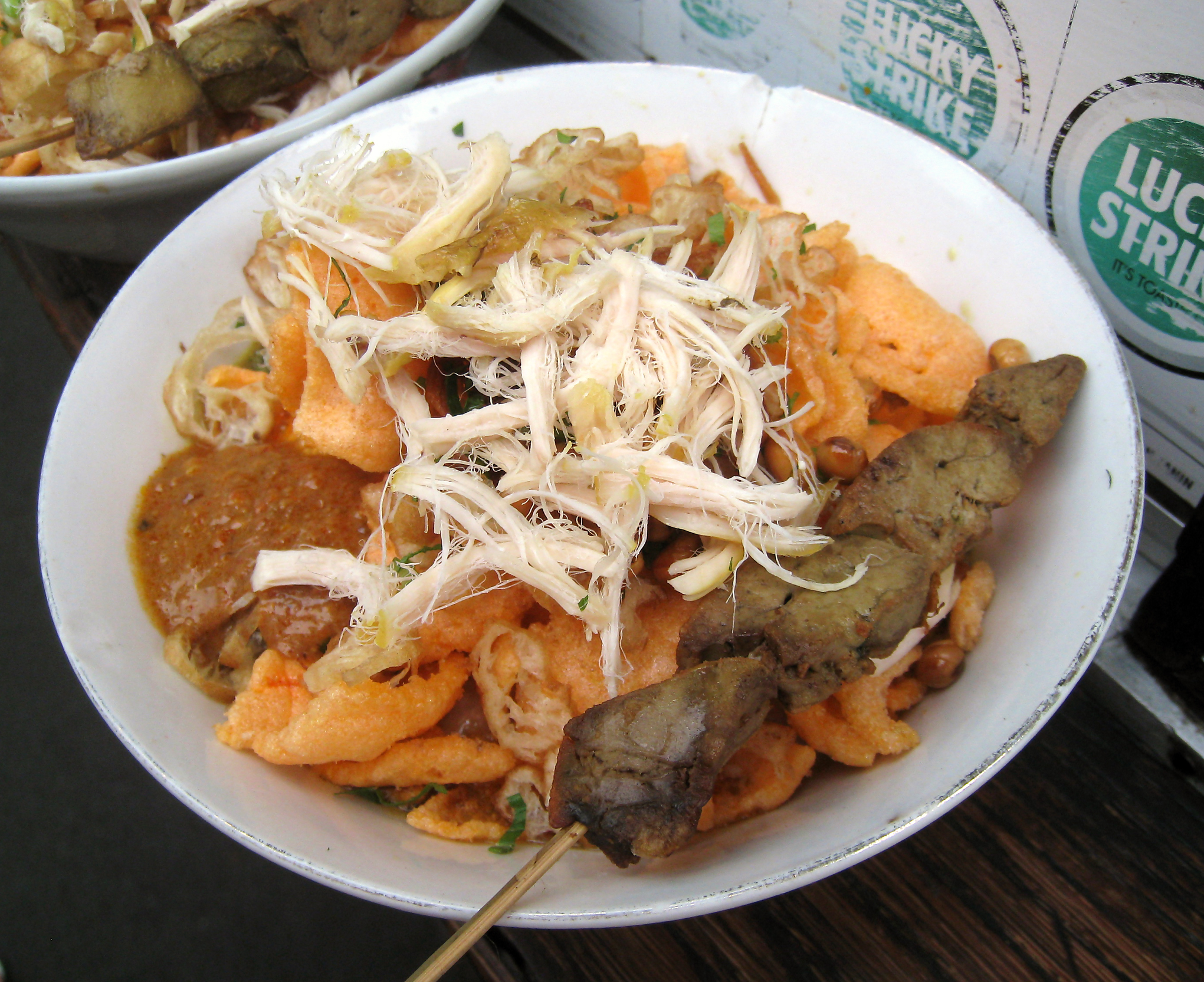
Bubur ayam with chicken liver satay, a popular street food in Indonesia.

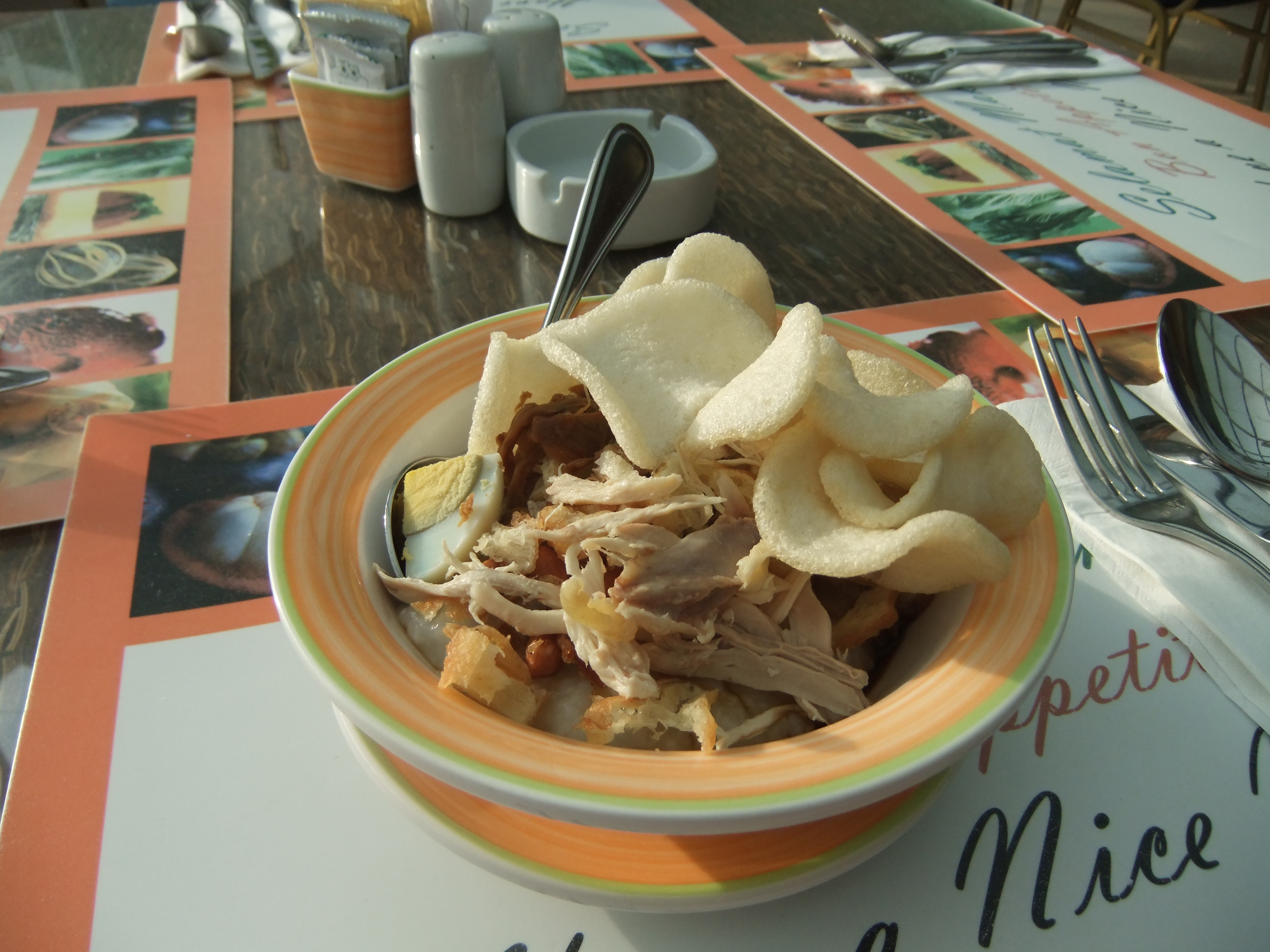
Bubur ayam served in Solo, Central Java.

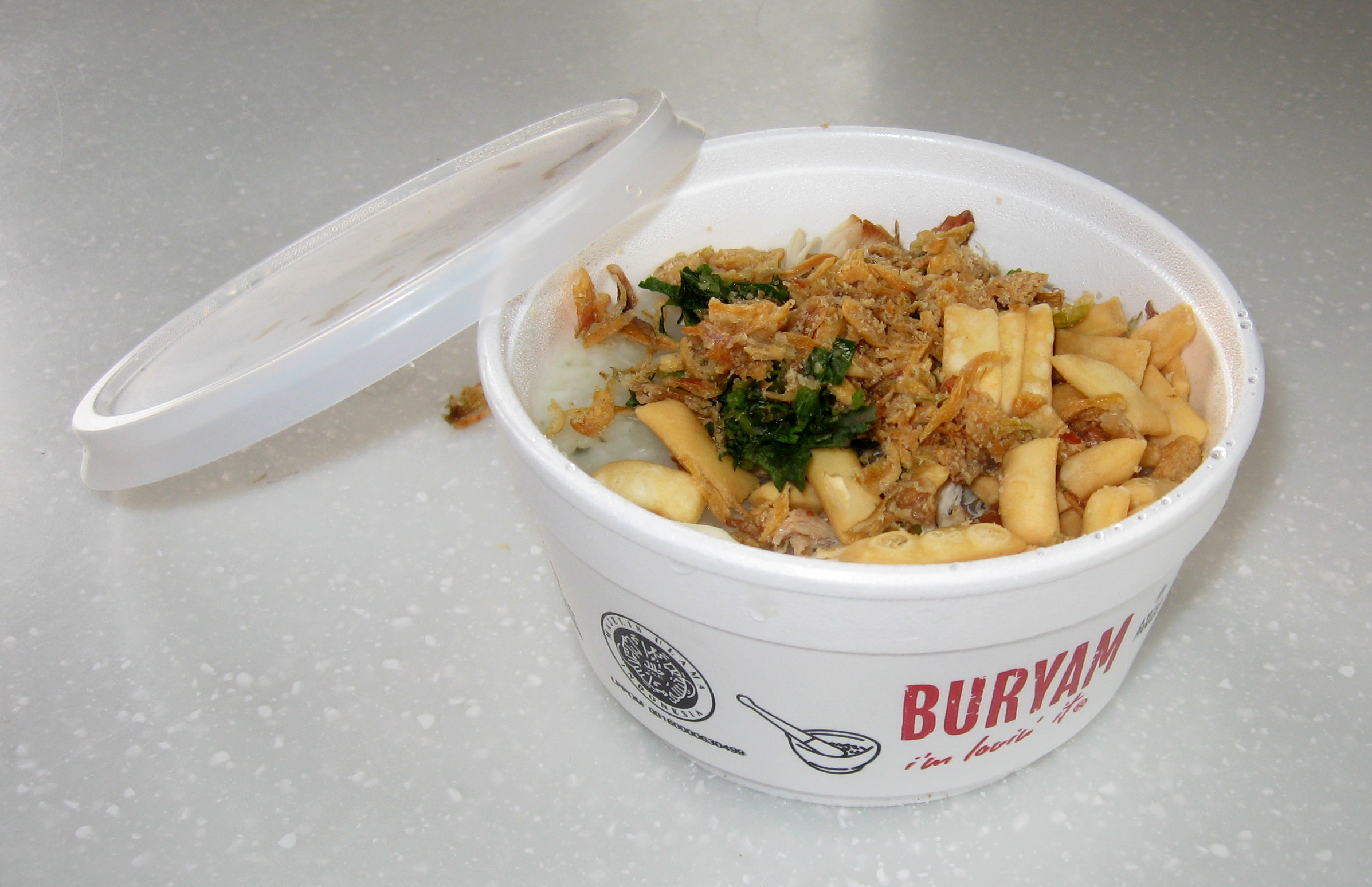
Fast food Buryam, a bubur ayam served in McDonald's Indonesia.

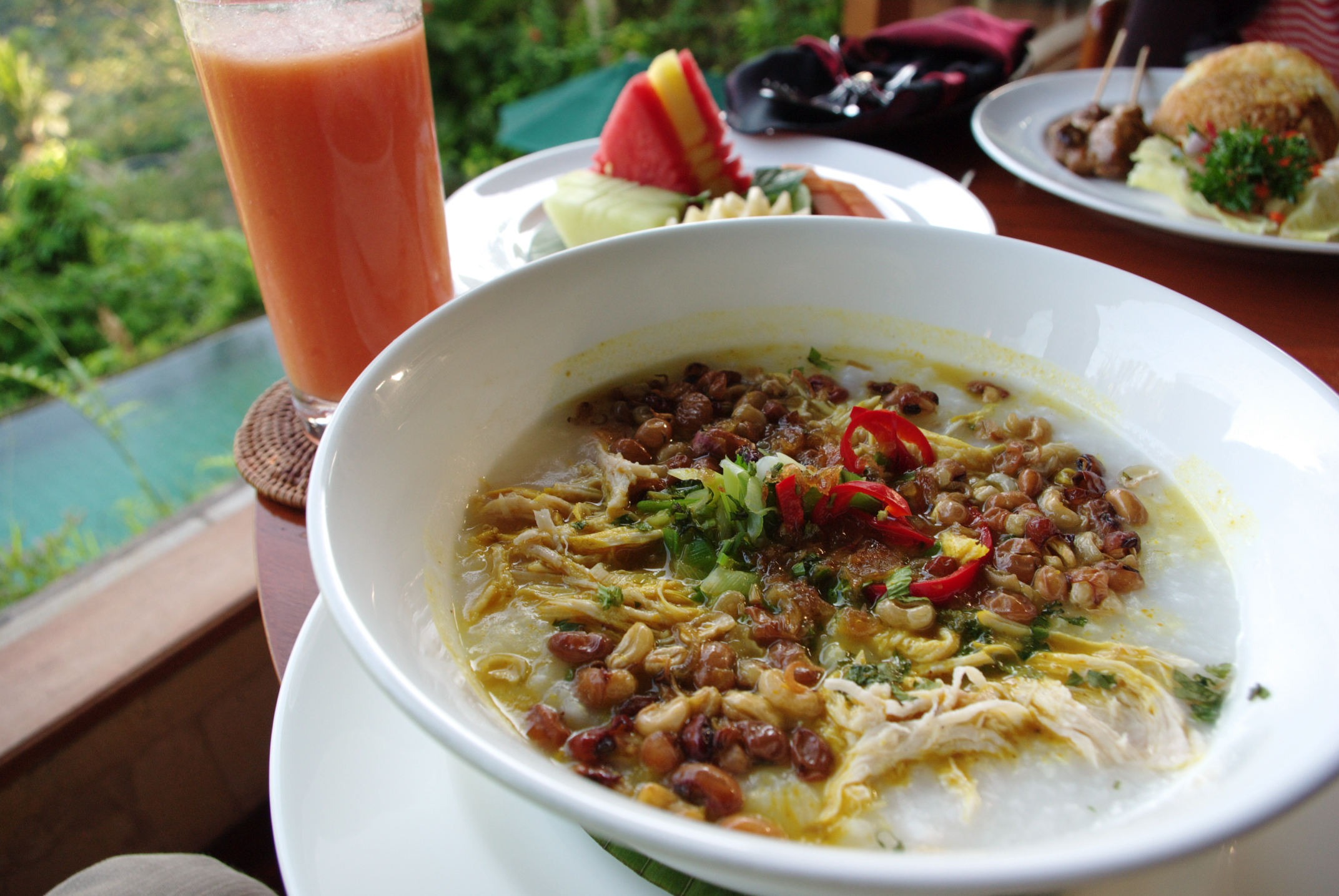
Bubur ayam served for breakfast in a hotel in Bali.

== See also ==
- Arroz caldo
- List of porridges
