= Breaking Dawn (disambiguation) =

Breaking Dawn is a novel by Stephenie Meyer.

Breaking Dawn may also refer to:

== Stephenie Meyer ==
Films and soundtracks based on the Stephenie Meyer novel:

- The Twilight Saga: Breaking Dawn – Part 1, a 2011 film
  - The Twilight Saga: Breaking Dawn – Part 1 (soundtrack)
- The Twilight Saga: Breaking Dawn – Part 2, a 2012 film
  - The Twilight Saga: Breaking Dawn – Part 2 (soundtrack)

== Other ==
- Breaking Dawn (2004 film), an independent mystery-thriller
- Breaking Dawn (album), a 2021 Japanese-language album by South Korean boy band the Boyz
- Operation Breaking Dawn, a 2022 Israeli military operation
