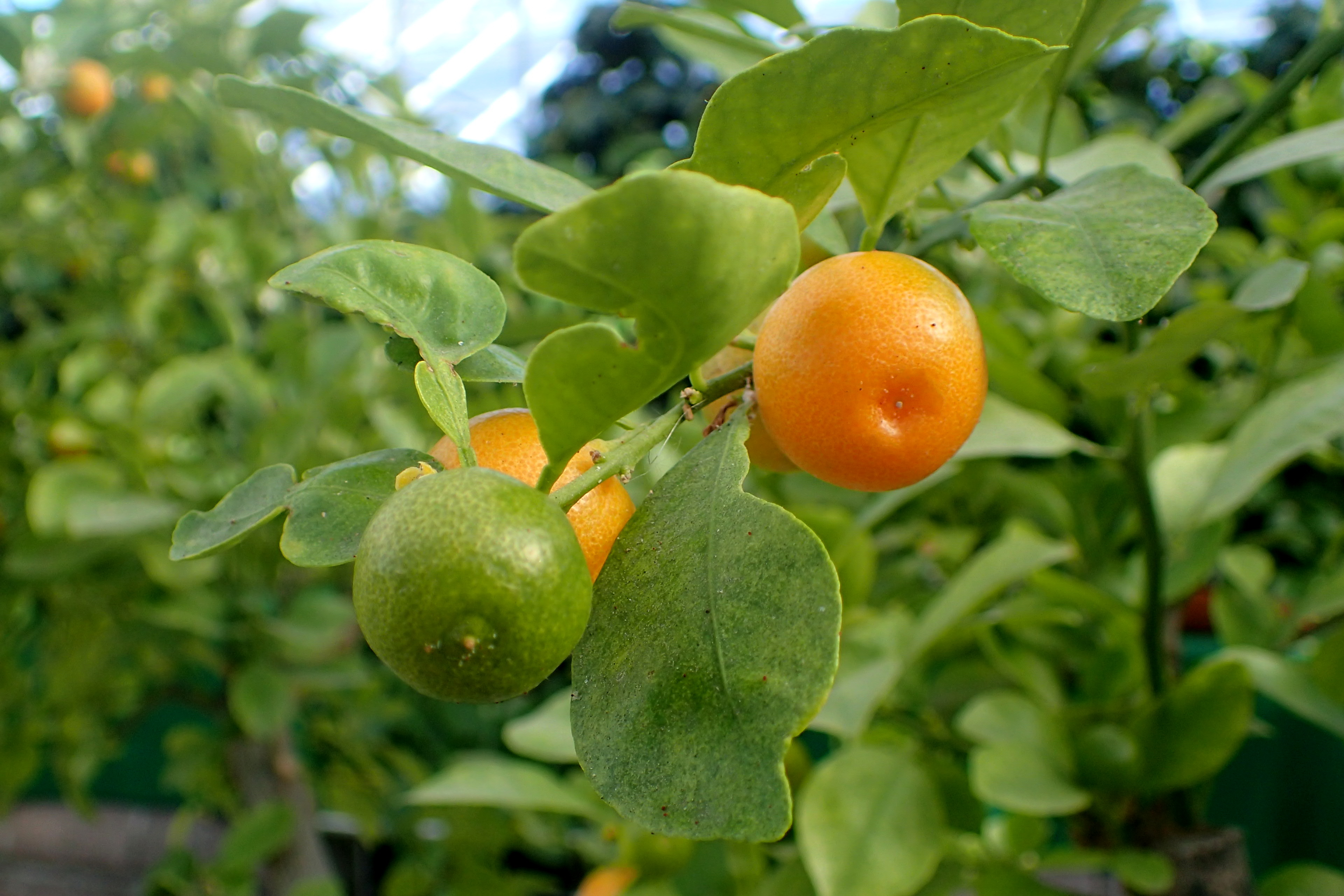

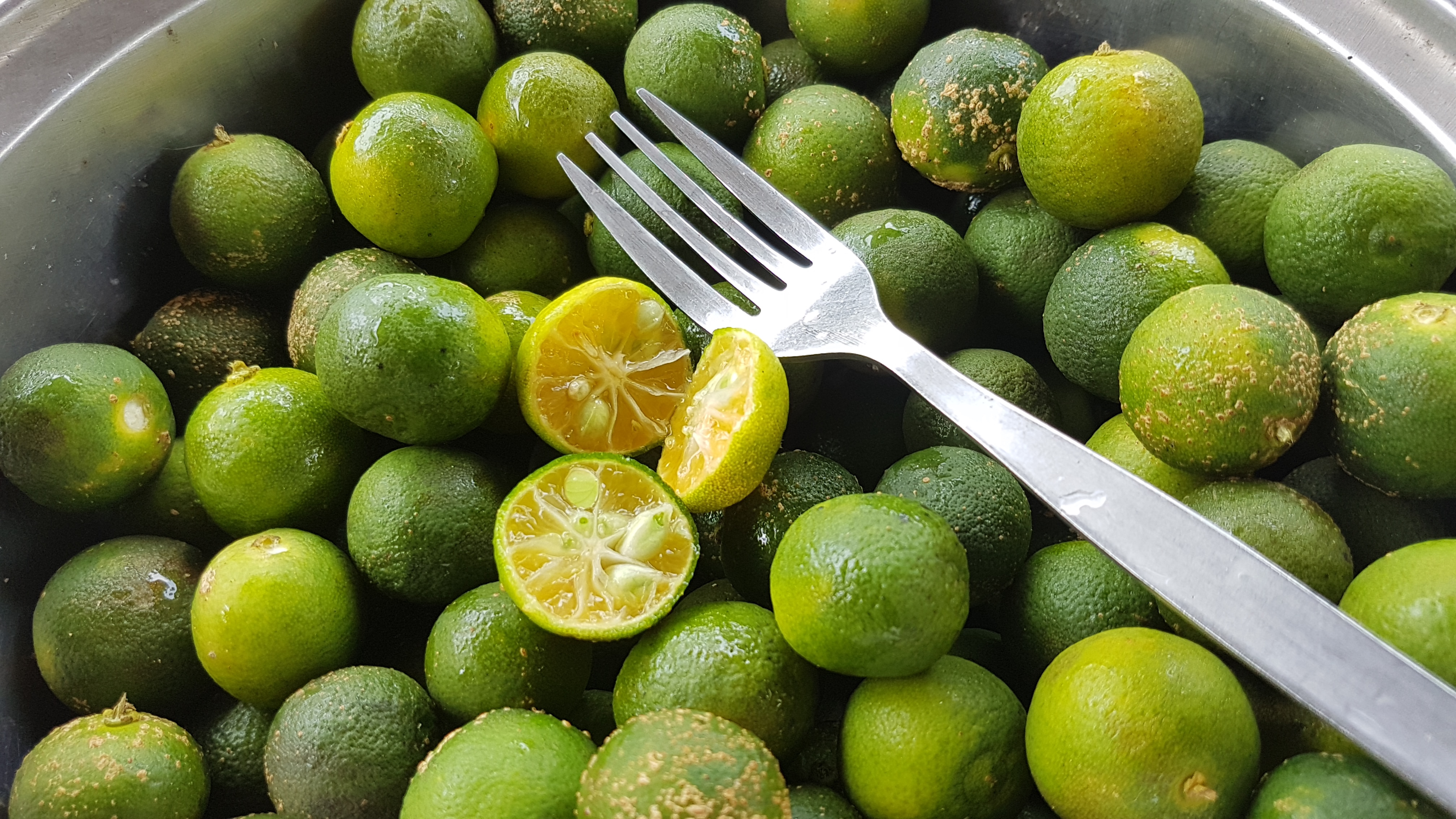

Scientific classification
- Kingdom: Plantae
- Clade: Tracheophytes
- Clade: Angiosperms
- Clade: Eudicots
- Clade: Rosids
- Order: Sapindales
- Family: Rutaceae
- Genus: Citrus
- Species: C. × microcarpa

Binomial name
- Citrus × microcarpa Bunge

Synonyms
- × Citrofortunella microcarpa (Bunge) Wijnands; Citrus × mitis Blanco; × Citrofortunella mitis (Blanco) J.W.Ingram & H.E.Moore

= Calamansi =

Hybrid species of citrus

Calamansi (Citrus × microcarpa), also known as calamondin, Philippine lime, or Philippine lemon, is a citrus hybrid cultivated predominantly in the Philippines. It is native to the Philippines; extending southwards to nearby parts of Indonesia (Borneo, Sumatra, and Sulawesi), Malaysia, and Brunei; and northwards to Taiwan and tropical regions of southern China (mainly Hainan).

Calamansi is ubiquitous in traditional Philippine cuisine. It is naturally very sour, and is used in various condiments, beverages, dishes, marinades, and preserves. Calamansi is also used as an ingredient in Malaysian and Indonesian cuisines.

Calamansi is a hybrid between kumquat (formerly considered as belonging to a separate genus Fortunella) and another species of Citrus (in this case probably the mandarin orange).

== Name ==
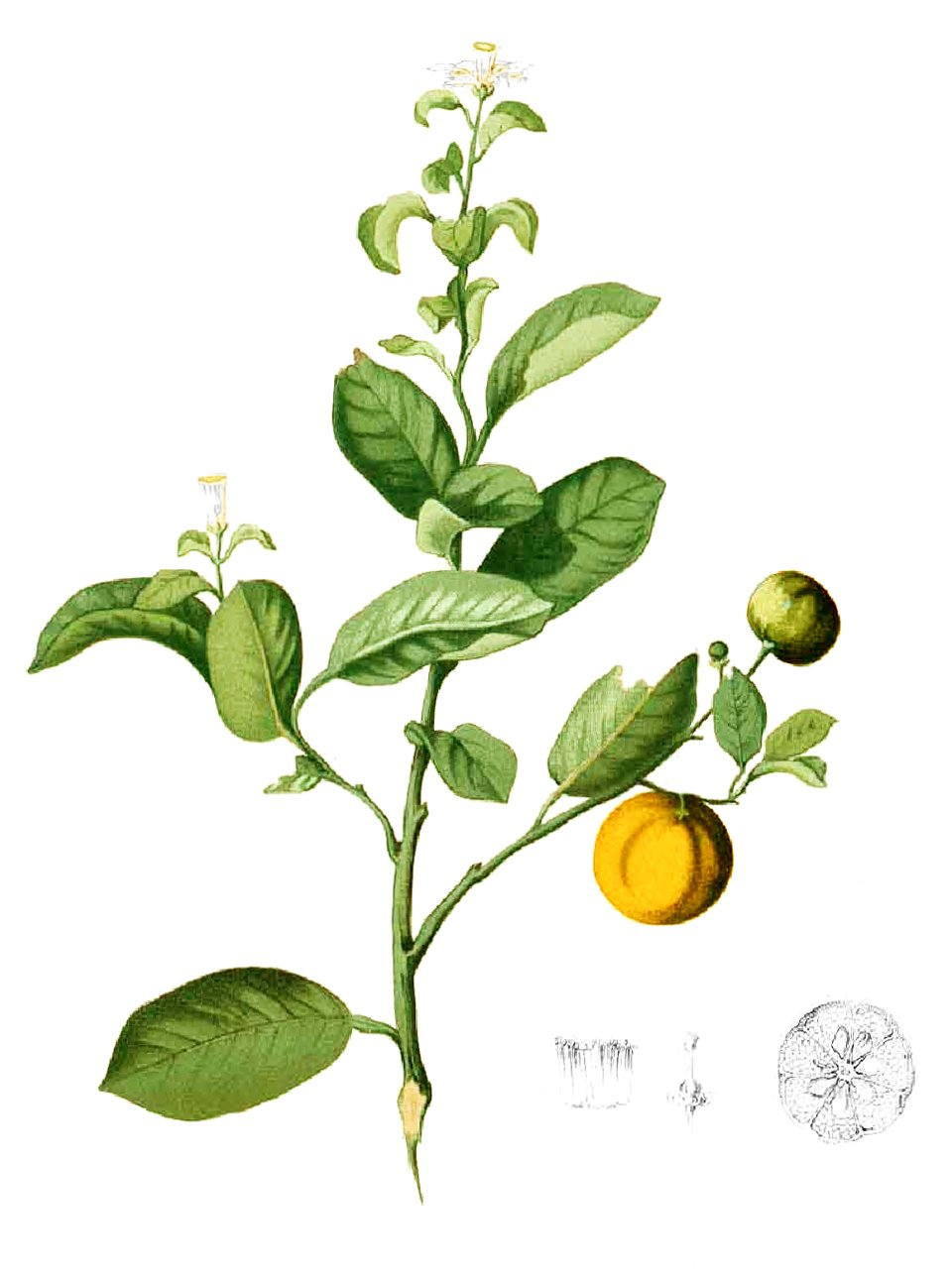
Calamansi drawn by Blanco, from Flora de Filipinas (1837)

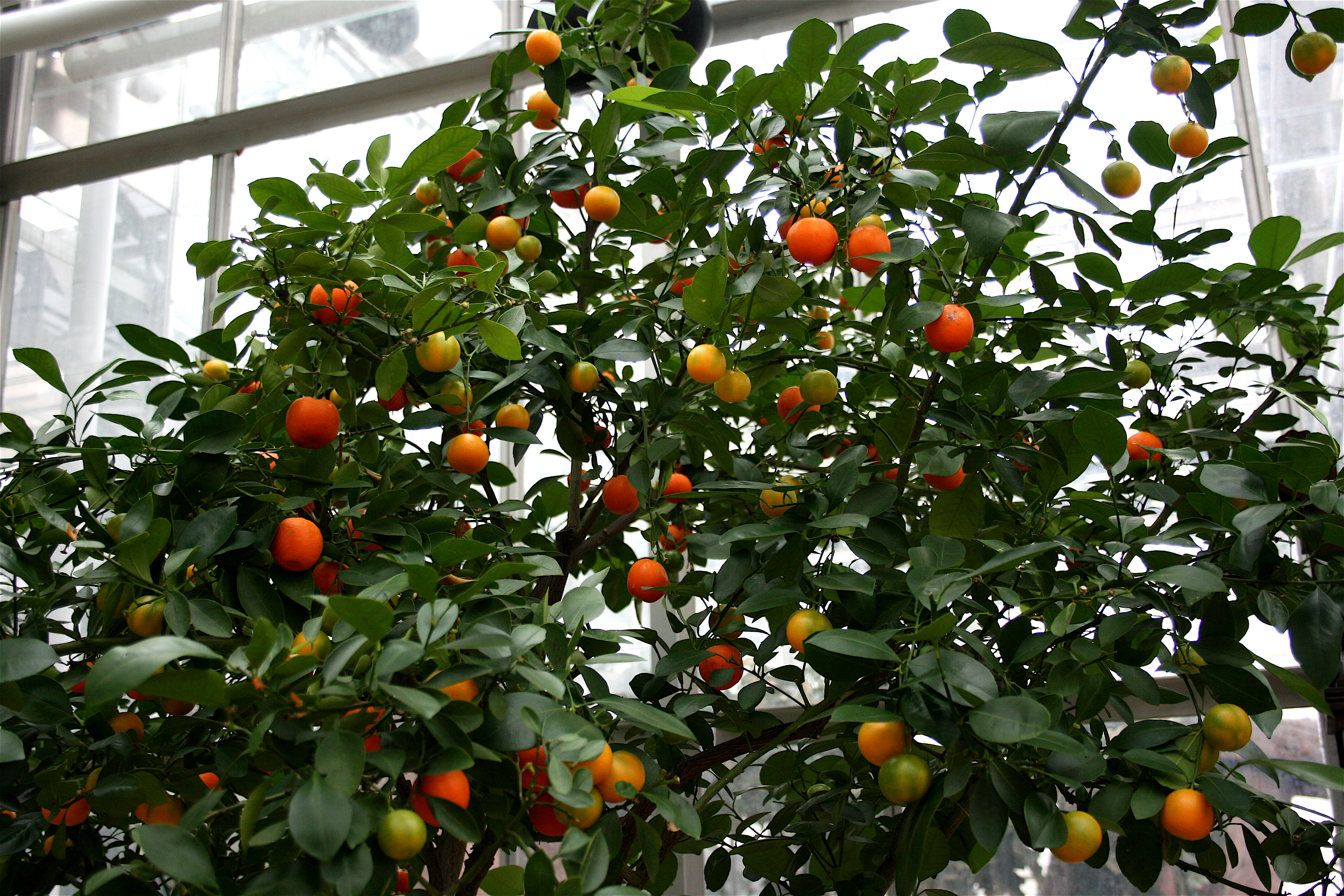
Calamansi tree with fruit

Calamansi is the Philippine English spelling of Tagalog kalamansi ([kɐlɐmɐnˈsɪʔ]), and is the name by which it is most widely known in the Philippines. In parts of the United States, notably Florida and Hawaii, calamansi is also known as "calamondin", an old name from the American period of the Philippines. It is an anglicized form of the alternative Tagalog name kalamunding.

Other English common names of calamansi include: lemonsito (or limoncito, Spanish for "little lemon"), Philippine lime, calamonding, calamondin orange, calamandarin, golden lime, Philippine lemon, Panama orange (also used for kumquats), musk orange, bitter-sweets and acid orange.

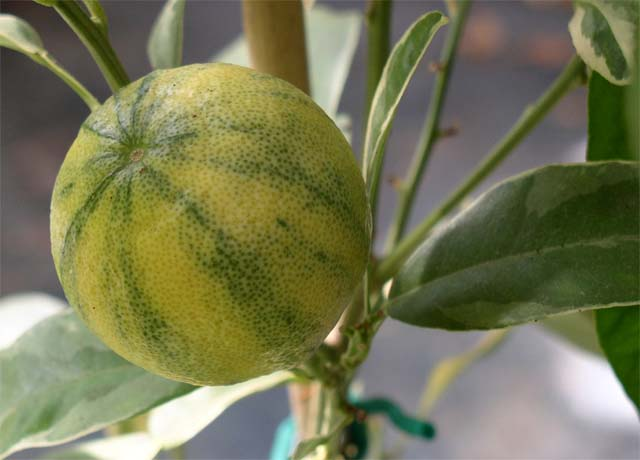
Fruit of variegated calamansi

Calamansi was formerly identified as Citrus mitis Blanco, C. microcarpa Bunge or C. madurensis Lour. All those referred to it as a citrus. Swingle's system of citrus classification put kumquats into a separate genus, Fortunella, making the calamansi an intergeneric hybrid in that older system. In 1975 it was therefore given the hybrid name × Citrofortunella mitis by John Ingram and Harold E. Moore based on Blanco's species name. In 1984, D. Onno Wijnands pointed out that Bunge's species name, C. microcarpa (1832), predated Blanco's Citrus mitis (1837), making × Citrofortunella microcarpa the proper name. Phylogenetic analysis now places the kumquat within the same genus as other citrus, meaning that its hybrids with other Citrus, including those formerly named as × Citrofortunella, likewise belong in Citrus.

Citrus × depressa (shikwasa), a similar citrus native to Taiwan and Okinawa, is sometimes called "calamansi" in English.

== Description ==
Calamansi, Citrus x microcarpa, is a shrub or small tree growing to 3–6 m (10–20 ft). The plant is characterized by wing-like appendages on the leaf petioles and white or purplish flowers. The fruit of the calamansi resembles a small, round lime, usually 25–35 mm (1–1 3/8 in) in diameter, but sometimes up to 45 mm (1 3/4 in). The center pulp and juice is the orange color of a tangerine with a very thin orange peel when ripe. Each fruit contains 8 to 12 seeds.

=== Variegated mutation ===
There is also a variegated mutation of the regular calamansi, showing green stripes on yellow fruit.

== Uses ==
=== Culinary arts ===
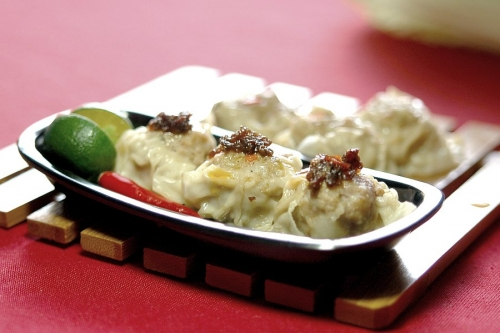
Calamansi is used in its partly ripe stage with soy sauce, vinegar, and/or labuyo chili as part of the most ubiquitous dipping sauce in Filipino cuisine, like in siomai.

The fruits are sour and are often used for preserves or cooking. The calamansi bears a small citrus fruit that is used to flavor foods and drinks. Despite its outer appearance and its aroma, the taste of the fruit itself is quite sour, although the peel is sweet. Calamansi marmalade can be made in the same way as orange marmalade. The fruit is a source of vitamin C.

The fruit can be frozen whole and used as ice cubes in beverages such as tea, soft drinks, water, and cocktails. The juice can be used in place of that of the common Persian lime (also called Bearss lime). The juice is extracted by crushing the whole fruit, and makes a flavorful drink similar to lemonade. A liqueur can be made from the whole fruits, in combination with vodka and sugar.

=== Philippines ===
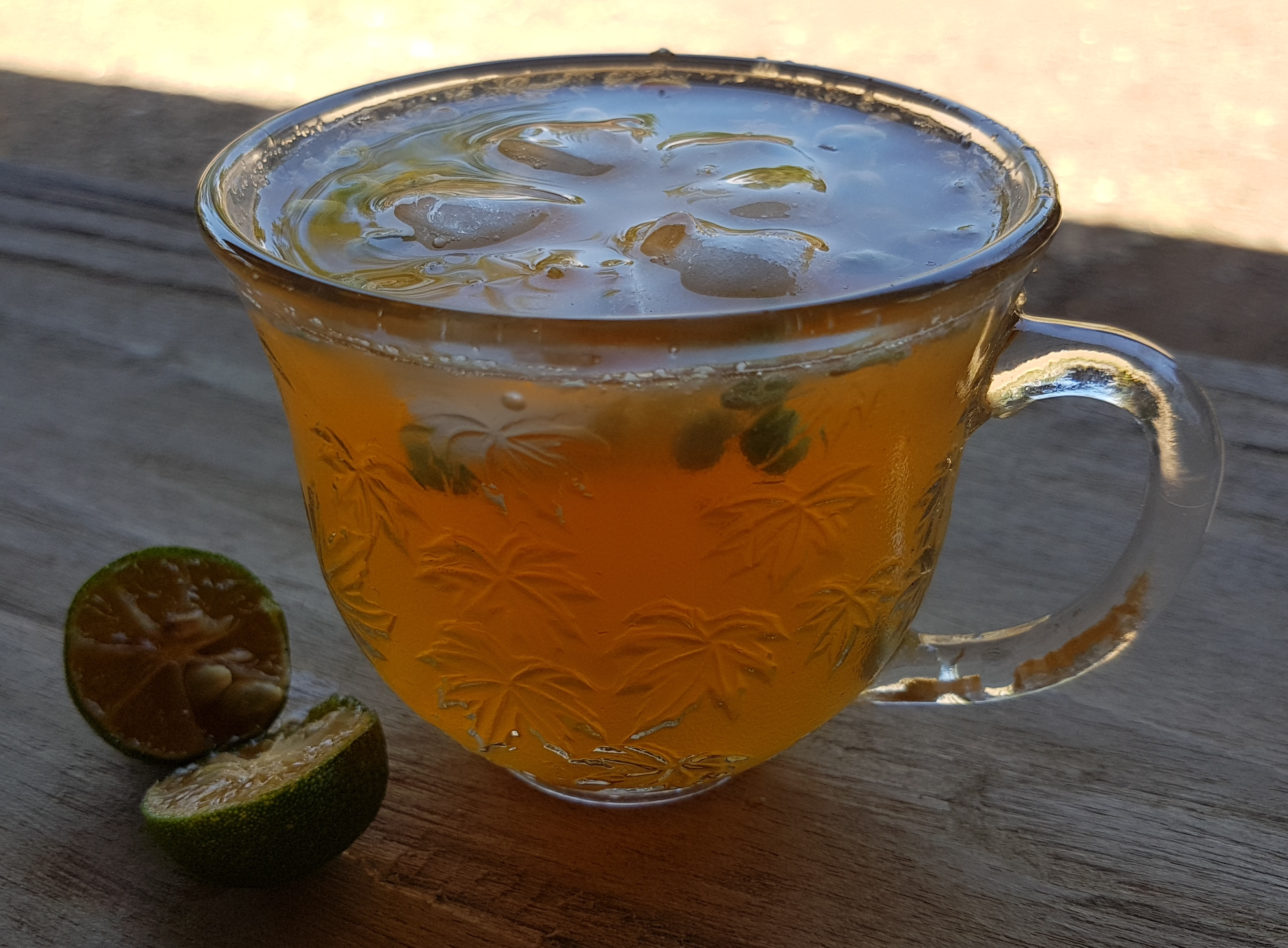
Calamansi juice from the Philippines

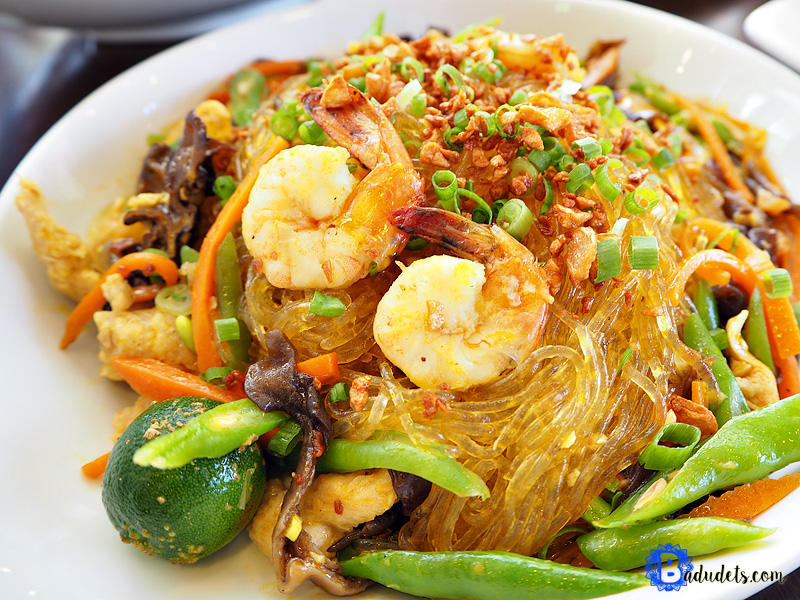
Pancit sotanghon guisado from the Philippines served with calamansi

In Filipino cuisines, the juice is used to marinate and season fish, fowl and pork. It is also used as an ingredient in dishes like sinigang (a sour meat or seafood broth) and kinilaw (raw fish marinated in vinegar and/or citrus juices). It is very commonly used as a condiment in dishes like lugaw (rice porridge), or in the basic sawsawan (dip) of calamansi juice, soy sauce ("toyomansi") and fish sauce ("patismansi"), used for fish, spring rolls, dumplings and various savoury dishes. It is used in various beverages, notably as calamansi juice, a Filipino drink similar to lemonade. It is also a common ingredient in salad dressings of Filipino ensalada dishes.

Calamansi is also characteristically used as a condiment in almost all pancit dishes (Filipino noodles), which adds a citrusy sour flavor profile. They are not usually cooked with the dishes but are provided as condiments, sliced into halves upon serving. They are meant to be squeezed over the noodles if desired.

Calamansi is also a traditional ingredient in kesong puti, a native soft, unaged, white cheese made from carabao milk. It is added, along with cane vinegar, to help with the curdling, while also adding a citrusy flavor.

=== In other regions ===
==== Indonesia ====
The fruit is used in local recipes in northern Indonesia, especially around the North Sulawesi region. Fish are spritzed and marinated with the juice prior to cooking to eliminate the "fishy" smell. Kuah asam ("sour soup") is a regional clear fish broth made with calamansi juice.

==== Malaysia and Singapore ====
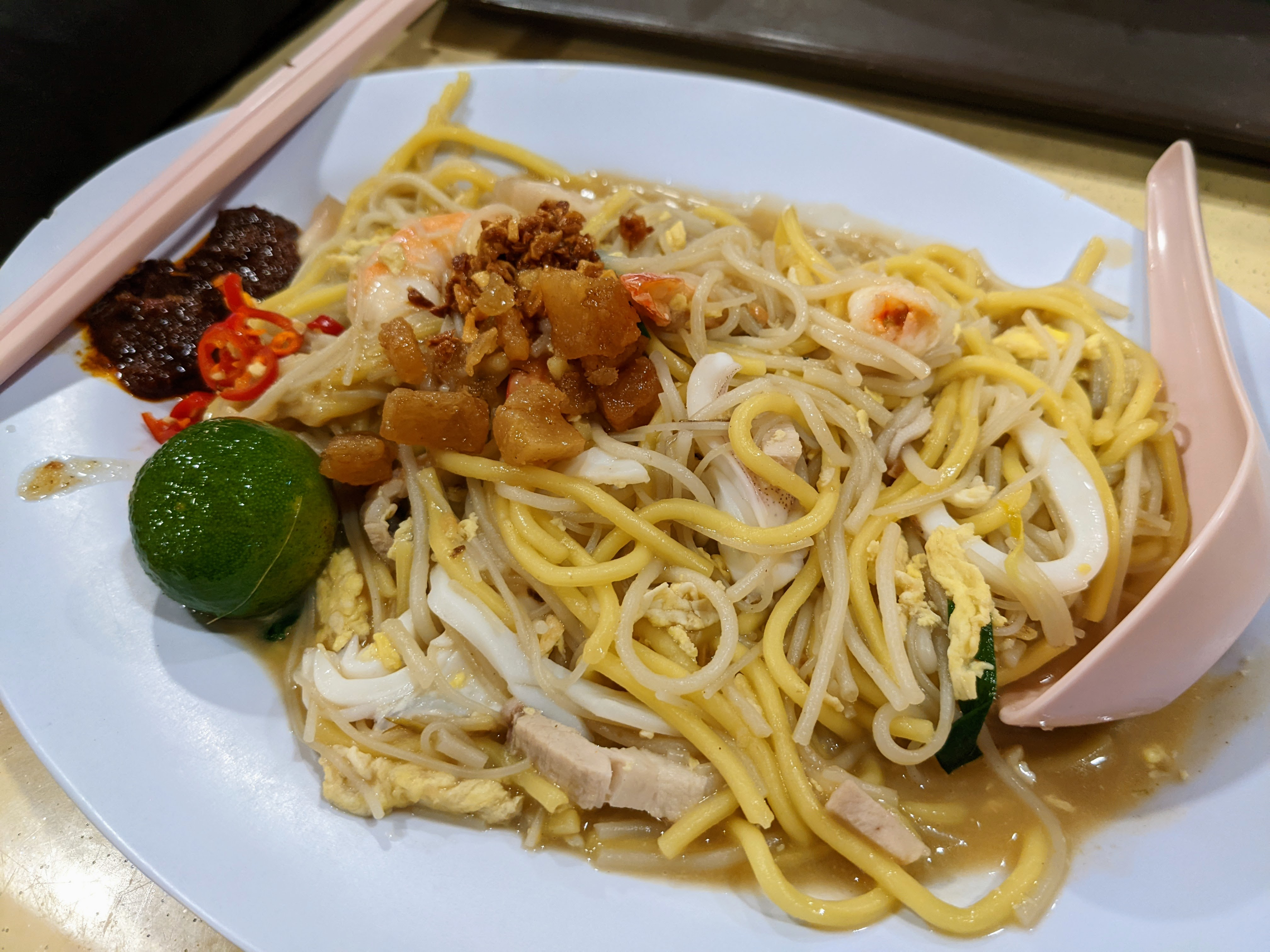
A plate of Singapore-style hokkien mee, served with calamansi

In Malaysia and Singapore the fruit, known in Malay as limau kasturi and in Malaysian and Singaporean English as "small lime", can be found paired with dishes at hawker centers and restaurants. It serves as a way to balance, often rich, dishes like noodles and stews. The plant is also sold as an ornamental.

==== Florida ====
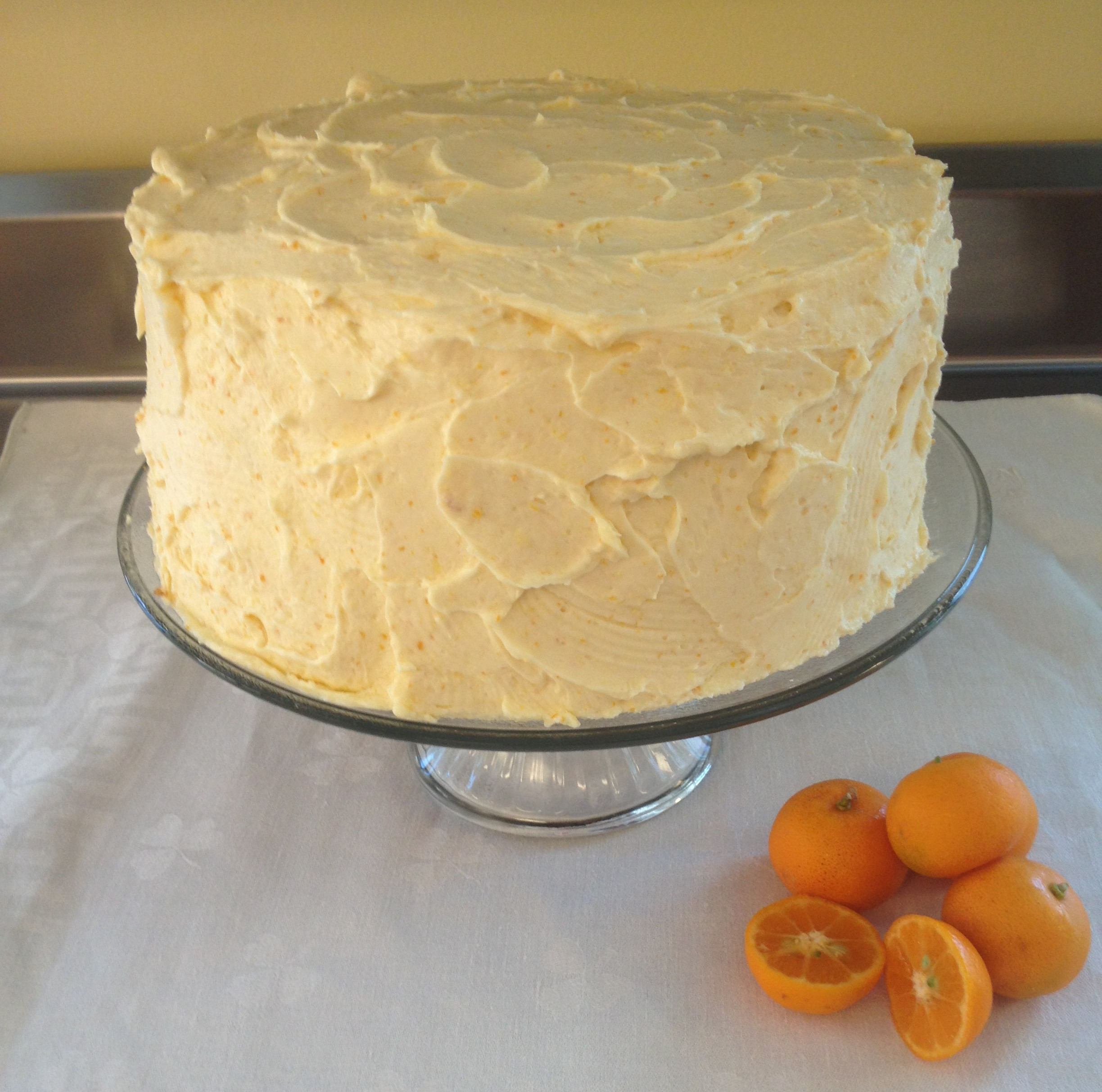
Frosted calamondin cake from Florida

In Florida, the fruit is used in its fully ripe form with a more mature flavor profile than the unripe version. Tasters note elements of apricot, tangerine, lemon, pineapple, and guava. The peel is so thin that each fruit must be hand snipped from the tree to avoid tearing. The entire fruit minus the stems and seeds can be used. It is hand processed and pureed or juiced and used in various products such as calamondin cake, coulis, marmalade, and jam. The peels can be dehydrated and used as a gourmet flavoring with salt and sugar. The fruit was popular with Florida cooks in cake form from the 1920s to the 1950s.

Floridians who have a calamansi in the yard often use the juice in a summer variation of lemonade or limeade, as mentioned above, and, left a bit sour, it cuts thirst with the distinctive flavor; also it can be used on fish and seafood, or wherever any other sour citrus would be used.

==== Sri Lanka ====
The fruit is cultivated in home gardens in Sri Lanka, and is known as නස් නාරං (nas narang) in Sinhala. It is used in Ayurveda medicine as treatment for vitamin C deficiency, hyperlipidemia, and upper respiratory tract infections.

== Cultivation ==
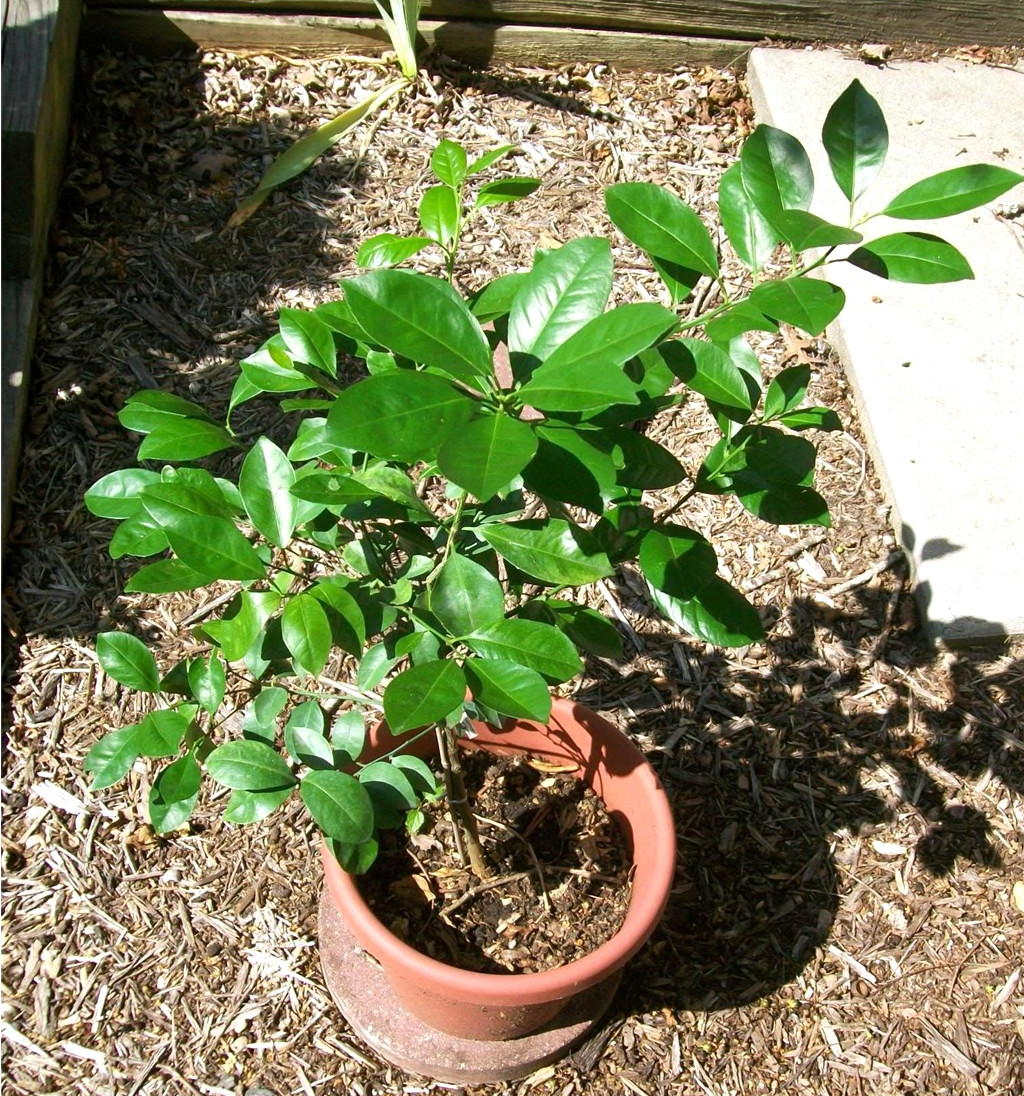
Cultivated calamansi seedling

The Philippines is the only major producer of calamansi. It ranks as the fourth most widely-grown fruit crop in the Philippines, after banana, mango, and pineapple. It is primarily grown for its juice extracts which are exported to the United States, Japan, South Korea, Canada, and Hong Kong, among others.

The Philippines exports between 160,000 and 190,000 metric tons of calamansi juice each year. Major production centers include the Southwestern Tagalog Region, Central Luzon, and the Zamboanga Peninsula. Its cultivation has spread from the Philippines throughout Southeast Asia, India, Hawaii, the West Indies, and Central and North America, though only on a small scale.

In sub-tropical and parts of warm temperate North America, × Citrofortunella microcarpa is grown primarily as an ornamental plant in gardens, and in pots and container gardens on terraces and patios. The plant is especially attractive when the fruits are present.

The plant is sensitive to prolonged and/or extreme cold and is therefore limited outdoors to tropical, sub-tropical and the warmer parts of warm temperate climates, such as the coastal plain of the southeastern United States (USDA zones 8b - 11), parts of California, southern Arizona, southern Texas, and Hawaii. Potted plants are brought into a greenhouse, conservatory, or indoors as a houseplant during the winter periods in regions with cooler climates.

In cultivation within the United Kingdom, this plant has gained the Royal Horticultural Society's Award of Garden Merit in 2017.

== See also ==
- Citrus depressa (shikwasa, hirami lemon), a similar cultivar widely used in Taiwan and Okinawa, Japan
- Citrus poonensis (ponkan orange), a similarly sized sweet orange from China
- Rangpur lime
- Calamansi
