= Kishu mikan =

Variety of citrus fruit

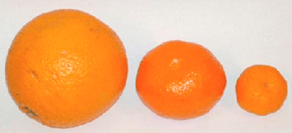
A sweet orange (largest), another variety of mikan, or mandarin orange (middling), and a kishu mikan (smallest)

The kishu mikan (Citrus kinokuni ex Tanaka), from Japanese Kishū mikan (紀州蜜柑), is a hybrid variety of mikan, or mandarin orange (Citrus reticulata), found in Southern China and also grown in Japan.

The fruit is also known as Baby Mandarin, Tiny Tangerine, Mini Mandarin and Kishu Mandarin. It is sold under the brand name "Cherry Orange" in Europe. It is shaped like a mandarin, between 25 and 50 mm (0.98 and 1.97 in) in diameter. The fruit's orange skin is thin and smooth.

In Shanghai this variety is also known as 乳桔 (Rǔ jú) milk-orange or 蜜桔 (mì jú) honey-orange comes from Shanghai.

Some varieties of kishu, such as the mukaku kishu, are seedless. The species is used in creating seedless hybrid citrus. The largest variety is the hira kishu.

== Taxonomy ==
Under the Tanaka system of citrus taxonomy, the kishu mikan was categorized as a separate species named Citrus kinokuni, while the Swingle system grouped it with other pure and hybrid mandarins as a single species, Citrus reticulata. It may also be called the Kinokuni group. In the 2010s, genetic sequencing allowed resolution of taxonomic debate, placing kishus and a number of other mandarin varieties as mutated clones of one another. All of them are the offspring of a single mildly-hybrid citrus (citrus plants generally hybridize freely). See Kishu mikan#Relatives below.

=== Phylogeny ===
18 varieties are known:

- The seeds of C. kinokuni fertilized with pollen from Koji create the Fukure mikan and the Suruga Yuko.
- Fertilization with pollen from Kunenbo-A gives Satsuma and pollen from Kobeni, creates the mikan Sokitsu.
- Pollen from C. kinokuni fertilizing seeds from Kaikoukan create the Andoukan and Sanbokan varieties.
- Pollen from C. kinokuni fertilizing seeds from Kunenbo-A creates Yatsushiro variety.

=== Morphology ===
The trees flower in April and produce small fruits between 25 mm to 45mm and about 25 to 50 grams by weight. Ripening begins in November in the climates around China and in January in Southern California.

== History ==
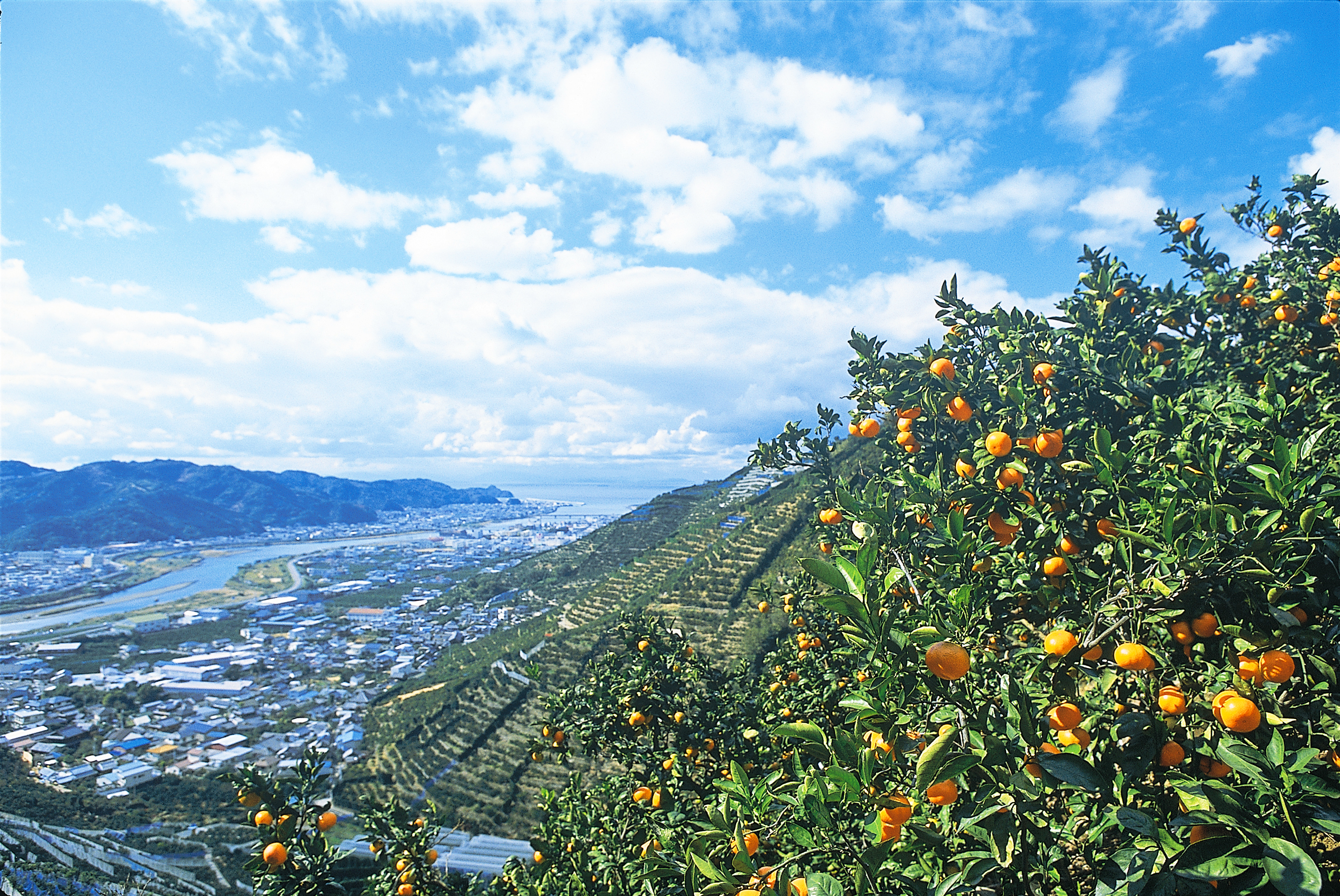
Mandarins (actually Arida mandarins, not kishu mandarins) being grown on the steep hillsides above the city of Arida.

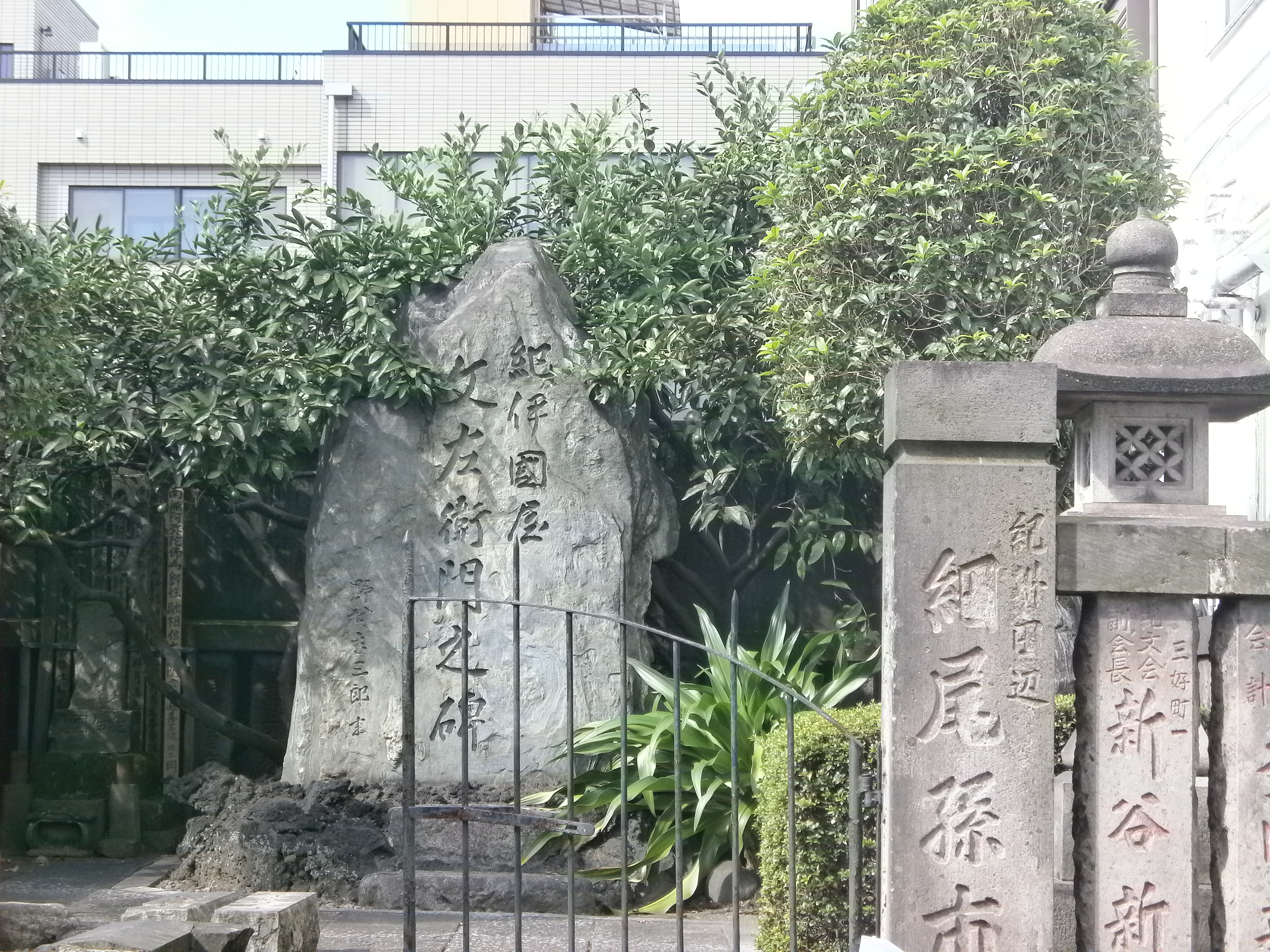
Kishu mandarin trees shading the grave of Kinokuniya Bunzaemon, a merchant who exported kishus to Edo.

The fruit is thought to have arisen in Southern China; it is believed to have been grown since the 700s. Its name was recorded in the records of Jianchang during the Ming Dynasty, and its agricultural growth is widespread in Jiangxi province. The variety was introduced to Japan around 1200.

The Kishū Tokugawa family, the Kishu branch of the influential Tokugawa clan, ruled Kishū Domain, and is said to have promoted the farming of mandarins on the hillsides around Arida, which were too steep to be readily terraced for rice production. Kinokuniya Bunzaemon (1669-1734) grew rich transporting the fruit to Edo (modern-day Tokyo). The scientific term "kinokuni [citrus] group" refers to kishu mandarins. Kishu mandarins remained the most popular citrus in Tokyo until the 1800s.

Kishu mikan were introduced to America in the 1800s but were not widely known. A seedless cultivar was developed for commercial production starting in 1983 at the University of California Citrus Research Center but citrus researchers dismissed the kishus as too small to be commercially viable. However, kishus became a favorite for graduate students and staff at UCR and were featured in tours of the UCR Citrus Variety Collection conducted by Ottillia Biehr in 2000. It was there that Jim Churchill and Lisa Brenneis of Churchill Orchard were introduced to the tiny fruit. They thought it was "cute" and went on to be the first to produce kishus commercially in the United States with the planting of an initial block of 50 specially ordered kishu trees in Ojai Valley, California. By the 1990s, the fruit had entered the market, and started to become widely available in the US around 2010.

The fruit became commercially available in Europe in 2006. It is also grown in Australia.

=== Modern Cultivation ===
Kishu mikan were cultivated in Algeria beginning in the 20th century. In 1983 a cultivar was developed that withstood importation as part of the Citrus Experiment Station in University of California Riverside with the goal of commercialization.

== Eating ==
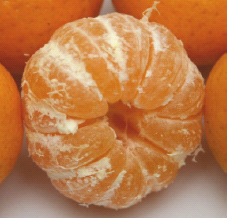
Peeled kishu mikan.

Picked but unpeeled, kishu mandarins will keep for a week at room temperature, up to twice that when refrigerated.

The fruit is enveloped in a thin skin (0.11 cm or 0.043 in thick) which secretes a mildly aromatic oil. It peels easily. The skin is dried as chenpi and used as seasoning, for instance in shichimi togarashi and chocolate.

The fruit usually has 7–14 sections. The alba (white lining of the skin) tends to come away cleanly with the skin, and the membranes between the segments are very thin. The cell walls within the segments are imperceptibly thin. Some varieties are seedless; others have seeds.

The taste is bright, juicy, sweet and rich but not notably tangy; the acidity is balanced by the high sweetness (11-14 Brix). The candy-like taste, loose peel, and small size make kishu mandarins popular with children.

== Cultivation ==
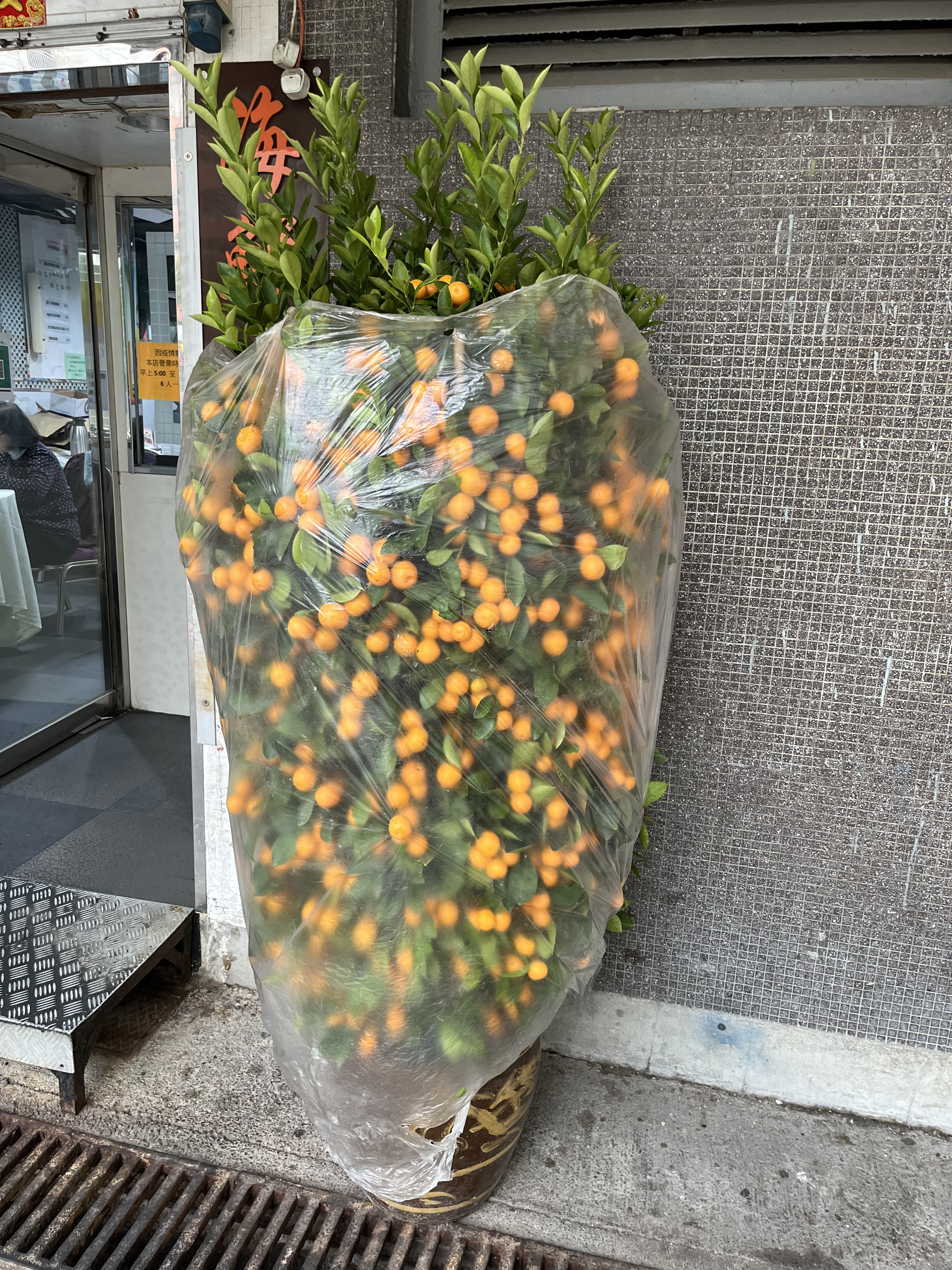
~2m/7ft-tall potted mandarin tree, possibly a kishu mandarin. Potted kishu trees do not grow much bigger than this.

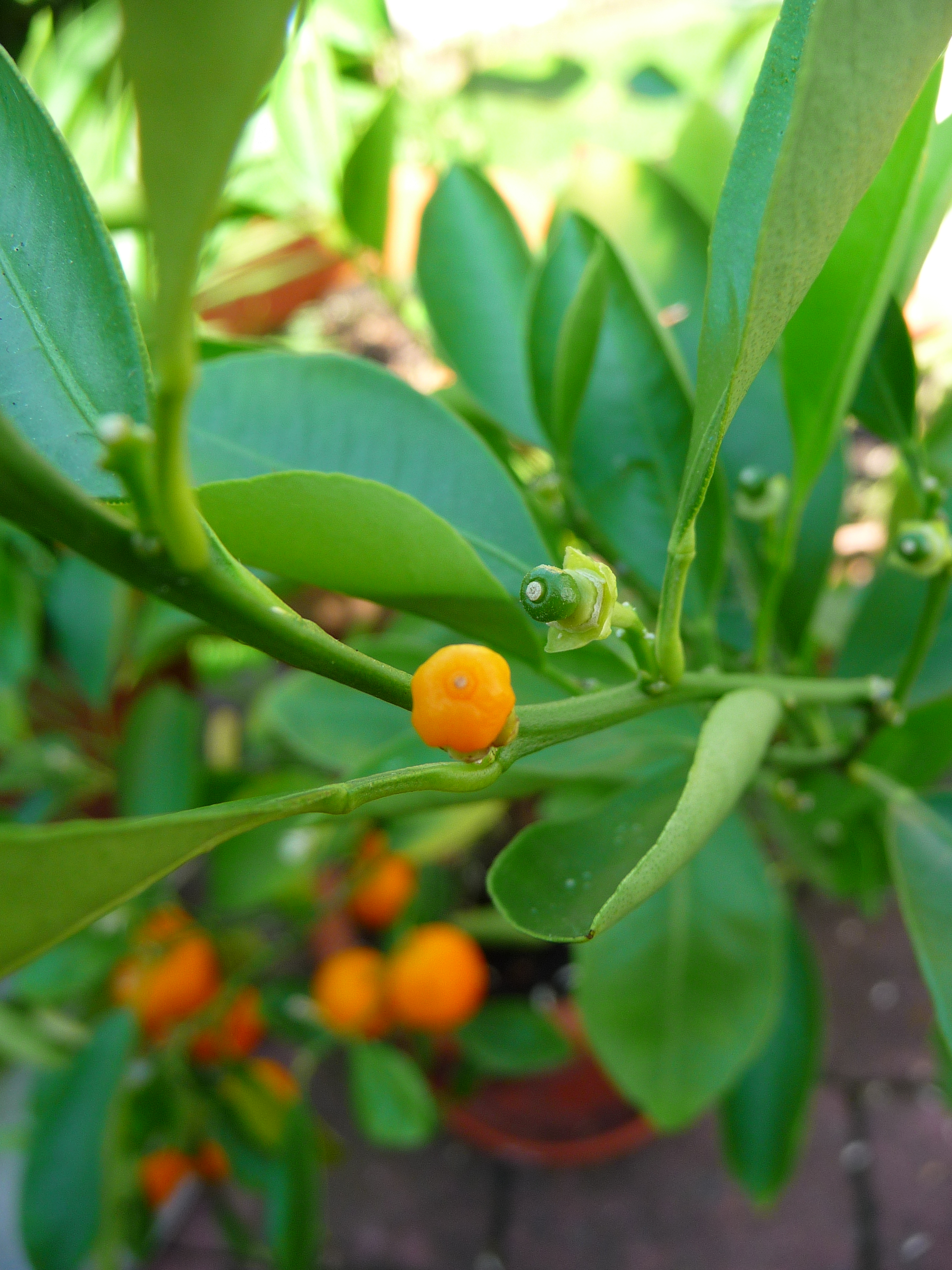
Fruiting mandarin, possibly a kishu mandarin, from the size, in Heidelberg, Germany. 2010

Kishu mandarin trees are commonly planted in household gardens in Japan, and grown in greenhouses, pots on balconies, sunny rooms, and commercial orchards.

They are small evergreen and perennial trees; they can live for centuries. Trees are often sold when about knee-high. They grow rapidly to a size of about 4 feet (1.2 meters) in diameter and 10 feet (3.0 m) in height (in pots, shorter: 7–8 ft or 2.1–2.4 m).

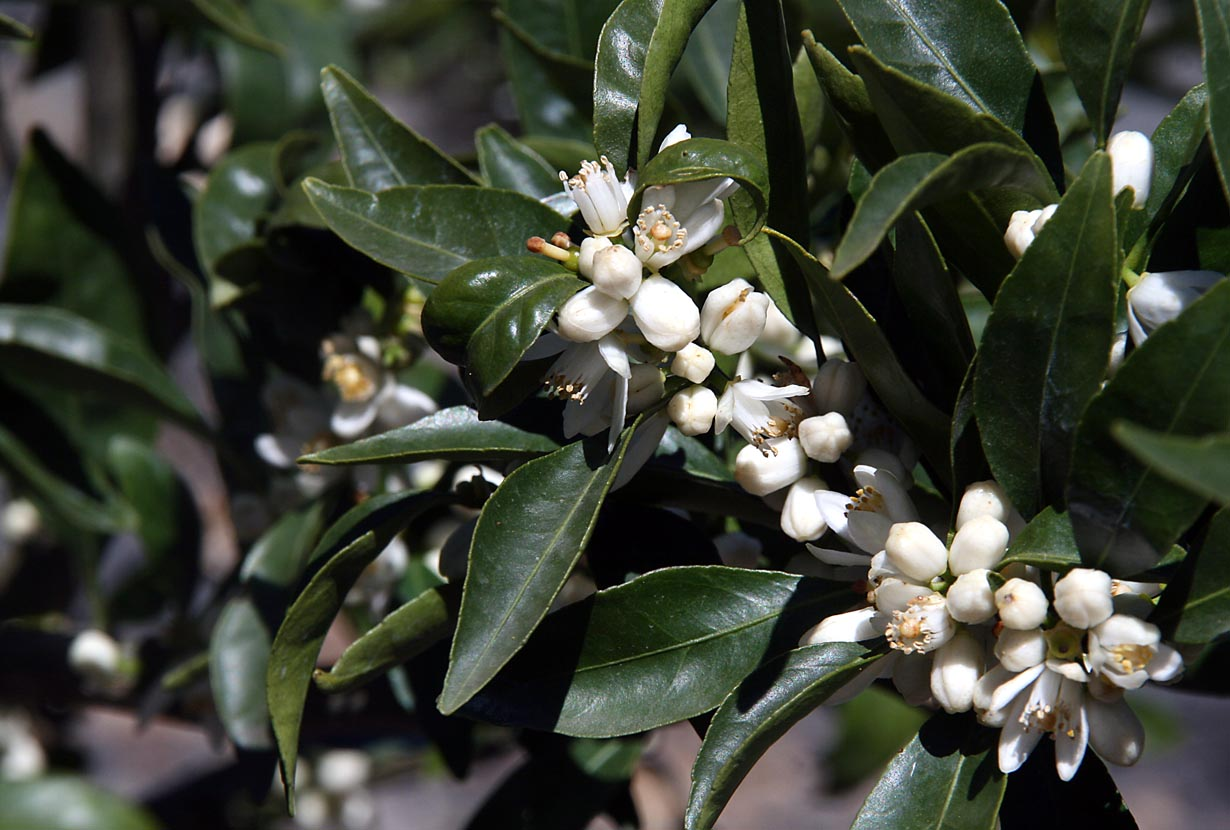
Budding blossoms, April 2022, coastal Portugal.

The trees flower abundantly in spring, around April in the northern hemisphere. Trees are self-fertile; manual transfer of pollen between blossoms (even just by shaking the branches) can improve yield. Trees thrive in high humidity but require well-drained soil. They require five hours of sun each day and will grow well and fruit in temperatures ranging from 55–75 °F (13–24 °C). If grown in containers, they can be taken indoors at night.

There is some disagreement about their degree of cold-hardiness. They are moderately cold-hardy citrus, but it is said of the seedless mukakukishu variety that trees should be taken indoors or wrapped in a frost cloth when temperatures fall below either freezing, or 20 °F (−7 °C). It is said of the same variety that they are cold-hardy down to 5 °C (41 °F) or −10 °F (−23 °C). It is said that it can be grown in patio pots in hardiness zone 4-11, and in zones 8-11 outdoors, or in zones 3-11 patio and 8-11 outdoors, or in zones 9-10. Kishu mikan trees may be grafted onto various rootstocks. Rootstock hardiness may affect tree hardiness.

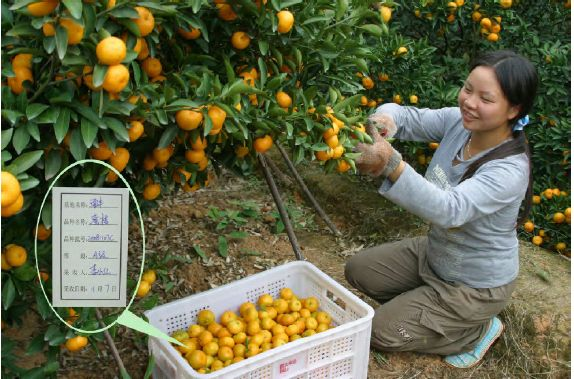
Harvest of the mukaku-kishu mikan.

The fruit grows to 1–2 in (25–51 mm) in size and is harvested in mid-winter; in the Northern Hemisphere, this is November to February, depending on the local climate. Trees may fruit in their first year and typically yield 88 lb (40 kg) of fruit annually.

When the fruit is left on the tree for too long, it can lose its flavor, with the fruit becoming puffy and losing its acidity. Older trees may produce smaller fruits.

The fruit needs to be handled with care to avoid damage; it is usually picked by hand. Its small size makes harvesting and sorting it more labour-intensive per unit weight.

== In popular culture ==
Seedless varieties are popular in the United States, but were traditionally considered unlucky in Japan, where seeded varieties are preferred in the belief that the seeds represent family members and descendants. Kishu mandarins became traditional Christmas gifts in Canada, a custom which probably spread from the Japanese immigrant community.

== Relatives ==
Kishu mandarins are often propagated as budwood grafts, like other citrus (many can also reproduce asexually through apomixis). This means that all specimens of a citrus cultivar (citrus variety) are essentially clones of one another. Some of these clones mutate, somatic mutations that form bud sports; useful sports are then widely propagated by humans as new cultivars. A large number of mandarin varieties have been found to be mutant clone-siblings of kishu mandarins. These include:

- Nanfengmiju
- Kishus
  - Common Kishu
  - Hira Kishu (large)
  - Kishu mikan Ihara Ichijoji
  - Mukaku Kishu (popular seedless kishu)
- Komikans
  - Hisago komikan
  - Komikan Fukuyama (Kinkou pearl)
  - Komikan Kawachi
  - Komikan Tensui
  - Ozaki komikan
  - Sakurajima komikan Matsuura
  - Sakurajima komikan senbatsu
  - Sakurajima komikan Shirahama
- Kouda mikan
- Taka mikan

== See also ==
- Citrus taxonomy
- Japanese citrus
- Komikan (fruit), genetically identical
- Huanglingmiao, a somatic mutant form of the kishu: a close cousin, diverging from the kishu after domestication
- Unshu mandarin, a cross between the kishu and the kunenbo mandarin (see Japanese citrus)
