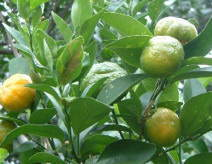
- Shiikwāsā on a tree

Scientific classification
- Kingdom: Plantae
- Clade: Tracheophytes
- Clade: Angiosperms
- Clade: Eudicots
- Clade: Rosids
- Order: Sapindales
- Family: Rutaceae
- Genus: Citrus
- Species: C. depressa

Binomial name
- Citrus depressa Hayata

= Citrus depressa =

Species of fruit and plant

Citrus depressa (Citrus × depressa, formerly C. pectinifera, Okinawan: シークヮーサー/シークァーサー, romanized: shīkwāsā, Japanese: ヒラミレモン, romanized: hirami remon), in English sometimes called shikwasa, seaquarser, shiikuwasha, shequasar, Taiwan tangerine, sheer-quoarserre, Okinawa lime, flat lemon, hirami lemon, or thin-skinned flat lemon, is a small citrus fruit often harvested and used when green, rich in flavonoids and native to East Asia (Taiwan and Okinawa Islands, Japan).

Very sour, it is often used like lemon or lime to garnish dishes, but is also used to make jams, or a yellow juice, which can be thinned or sweetened.

Its name is occasionally translated into English as calamansi (calamondin, Citrus × microcarpa), but this is a different fruit.

Shiikwaasa is primarily produced in southwest Japan, in the northern region of the main Okinawa island, along with another indigenous Japanese citrus, the tachibana orange (Citrus tachibana). The two are not the only species of citrus currently growing on the island, as there have been foreign species introduced and have since been crossbred alongside Citrus depressa. Despite the varying diversity of citrus currently found in the region, only shiikwasa, tachibana and Citrus ryukyuensis (tanibuta) are native to this region, originating in the Ryukyu Islands.

== Description ==
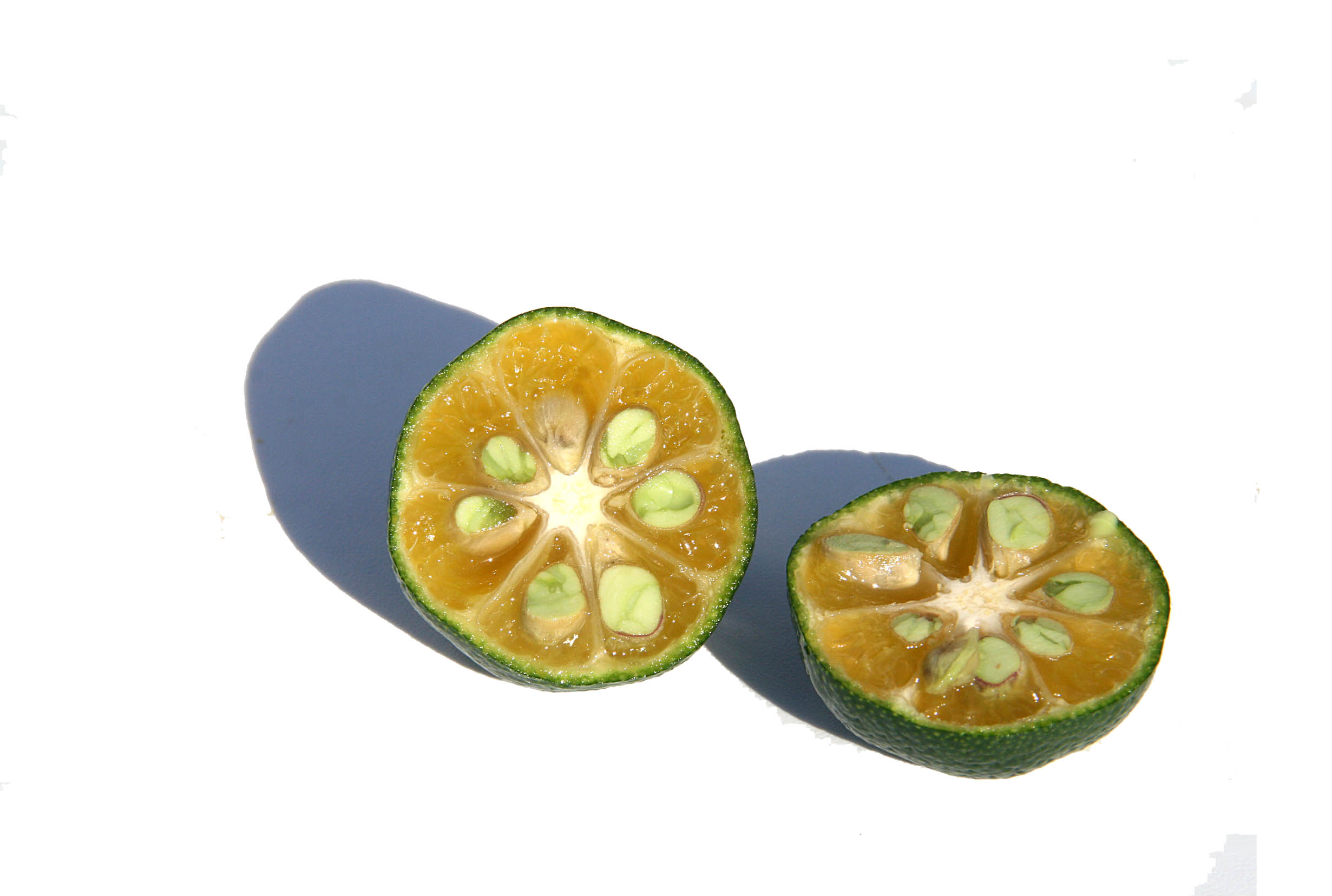
Citrus depressa, sliced in half.

Citrus depressa is grown in Okinawa and Taiwan. This flat lemon is a flowering tree with an average height of 3–5 m (9.8–16.4 ft). The appearance is similar to calamansi. The flowers, white and about 3 cm (1.2 in) in diameter, usually bloom in April. The fruit, which appear around July, weigh about 25–60 g (0.88–2.12 oz). Unripe, the skin is a dark green, which becomes yellow during ripening. The fruits have a very low sugar content and are very sour in September, but gradually become sweeter as they ripen.

== Genetics ==
Genetic analysis of shiikwaasa and other Asian island mandarin orange varieties revealed this group to be a family of independent clonal F1 hybrids, arising from multiple crosses between a native Ryukyu Islands mandarin species, C. ryukyuensis, and a mainland-Asian mandarin C. reticulata still found on Okinawa, designated RK3 by the researchers. This mainland parent is related to the Chinese Sun Chu Sha mandarin but has small amounts of pomelo introgression that was passed on to the shiikwaasa. The mainland parent reproduces clonally, as do the shiikwaasa progeny of numerous independent hybridization events with distinct individual sexually-reproducing Ryukyu mandarin parents, sometimes serving as seed parent and sometimes as pollen parent. This varied origin, plus the fact that shiikwaasa grow wild and are referred to in some of the earliest poetry of the island kingdoms, suggest that the hybridizations occurred naturally.

== Health benefits ==
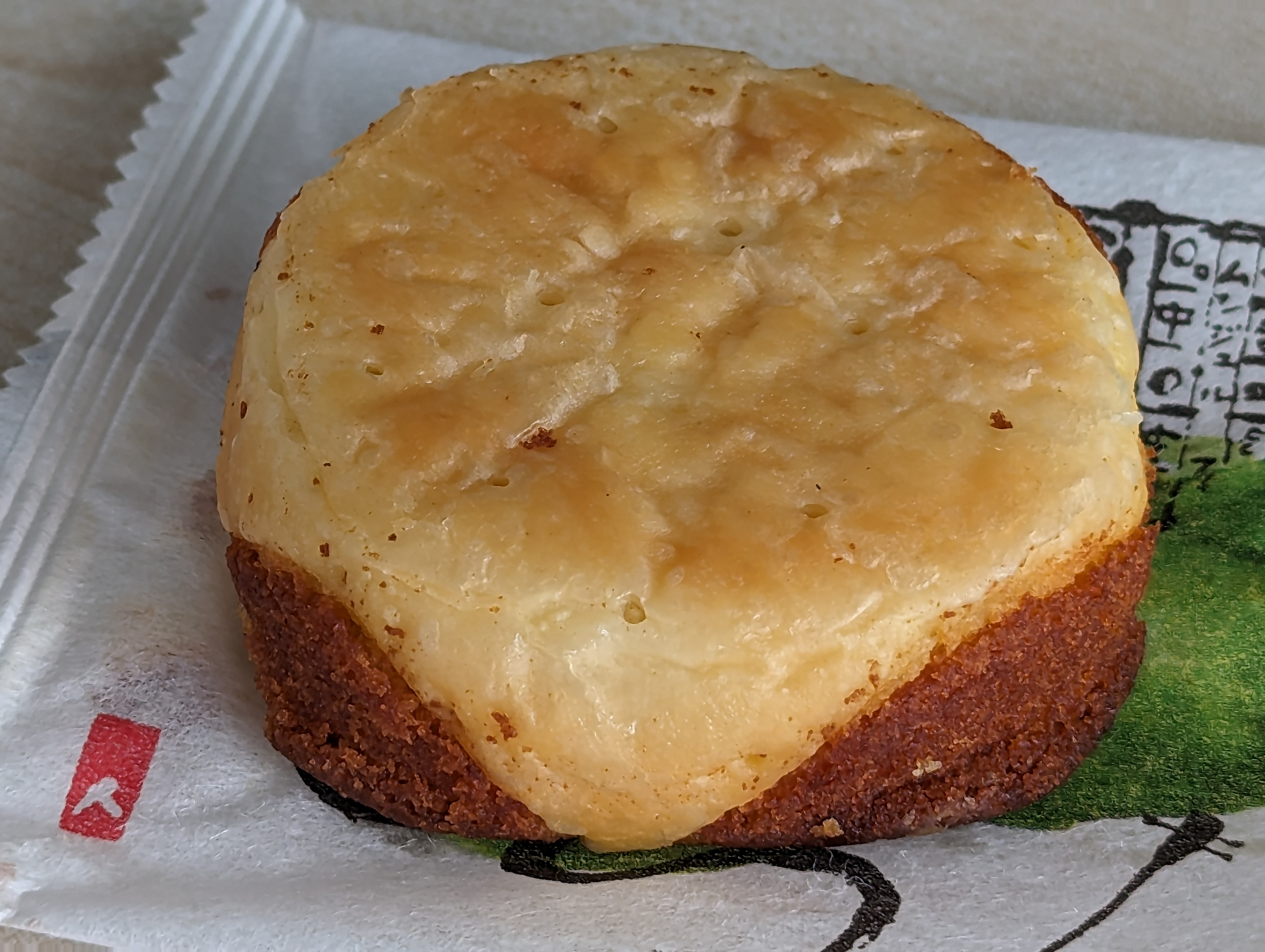
Shiikwaasa cake

Shiikwaasa is often used as a fruit juice and has been used for alternative health practices frequently. Though the pulp has some beneficial nutrients, most health-benefitting compounds present in the fruit's peel are:

- Synephrine, a compound known to enhance lipid metabolism and increase metabolic rate.
- Nobiletin (NBL), tangeretin and sinensetin, where nobiletin is predominate. NBL has been linked to anti-carcinogenic and anti-inflammatory biological properties. Similarly, there is a high concentration of anti-tumorous compounds limonin glucoside and nomilin glucoside in the fruits' seed. NBL is also linked to hepatoprotective activities in liver-injuries induced by acetaminophen.

Though commonly used as a fruit juice and considered an aid in metabolic health, C. depressa can potentially also aid in fat regulation. The addition of C. depressa alongside a high-fat diet has been demonstrated to decrease fat mass, though this is based on a study done on rat models, and little study has been done to determine a similar correlation in humans. Dried shiikwaasa, however, is often mixed with teas for its therapeutic benefits, and can be mixed into a fruit paste with chili pepper as a garnish on grilled meats. Shiikwaasa paste has also been demonstrated to decrease plasma glucose levels in lab rats and human volunteers.

High levels of flavonoids provide the bitter taste often associated with the fruit. To make shiikwaasa juice more palatable, sugar is commonly added excessively. However, fermentation of Citrus depressa juice has also been demonstrated to cause a significant decrease in the umami, bitterness and astringent tastes of the fruit, to aid in creating a more flavorful drink while maintaining the nutritional content of the fruit.

Shiikwaasa fruits are also a significant source of antioxidants. An in vitro study used antioxidant assays to determine that in 100 g (3.5 oz) of unripened shiikwaasa peels, there is either, approximately, 225.4 mg to 294.2 mg of total phenolic compounds – composed of β‐Carotene and DPPH – which varied due to differing extraction methods.

== See also ==
- Citrus microcarpa (calamansi), a similar cultivar widely used in the Philippines
