= Citrus reticulata Blanco =

Citrus reticulata Blanco may refer to:

- Nanfengmiju
- Pixie mandarin
