= Komikan (fruit) =

Citrus fruit and plant

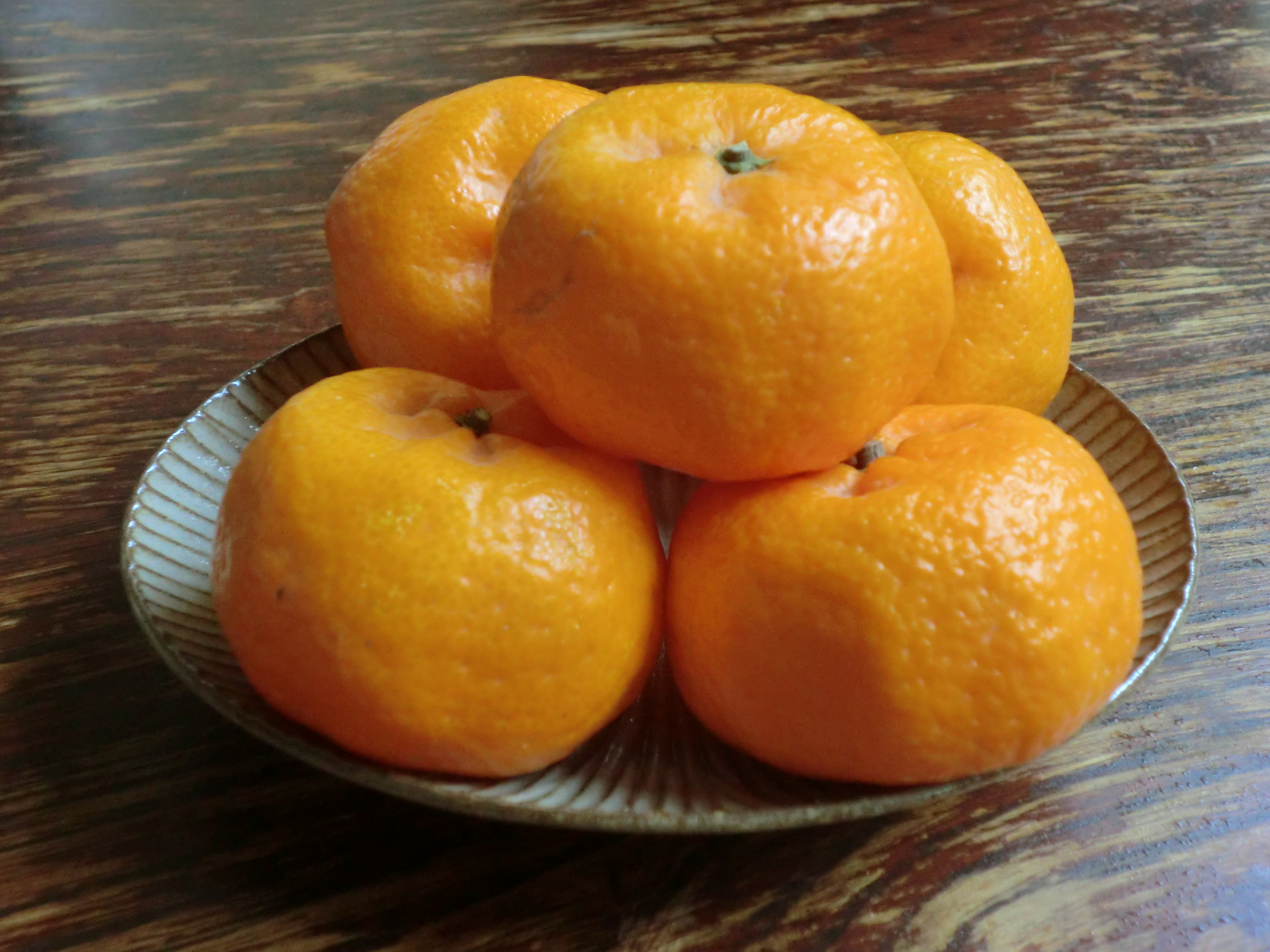
- Species: Citrus × sinensis
- Cultivar: 'Komikan' ( or 'Sakurajima komikan' orange)
- Origin: Kagoshima Prefecture, Japan

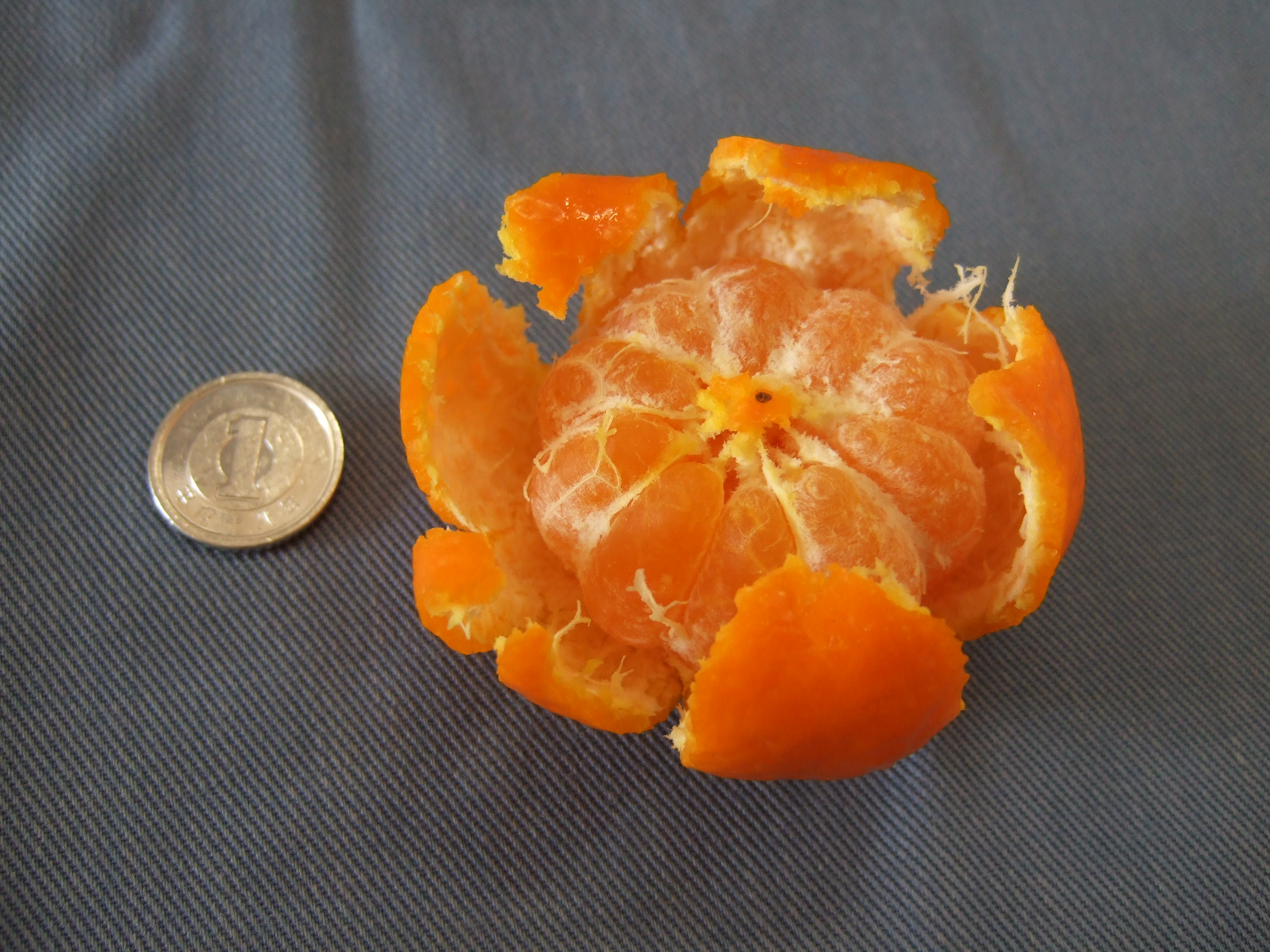

The komikan (小みかん, 小蜜柑) is a type of mandarin orange grown in Japan. "Ko" means "little", and "mikan" a type of citrus cultivar; komikans are unusually small. It is almost the same as the kishumikan.

It is sometimes called a Sakurajima komikan orange (桜島小みかん, Sakurajima komikan) grown on Sakurajima, an active composite volcano in Kagoshima Prefecture, Japan. The same cultivar is also grown in Fukuyama in Kirishima along Kagoshima Bay, and this is simply called komikan (小みかん, 小蜜柑).

== Summary ==
Because the soil is rich in volcanic ash, Sakurajima is not suitable for rice cultivation, so the 'komikan' is an important commercial crop. Some of the huge trees have been standing for over 200 years and sometimes a few hundred kilograms of mikan are produced from a single tree. The fruits ripen at the beginning of December and it turns into a flattened spherical shape that weighs anything from 20 to 50 grams (0.71 to 1.76 oz). Its pith is hard but sweet-tasting.

== History ==
There are three theories about how "Sakurajima Komikan" were first cultivated. The first is that Shimazu Yoshihiro, the second son of Shimazu Takahisa, the daimyō of Satsuma Province, took the oranges back to Satsuma from the Korean Peninsula after the two Japanese invasions of Korea in 1592 and 1598. Second, that he might have brought them from Kii Province after the Battle of Sekigahara on October 21, 1600. The third theory is that he brought back "Takada mikan" oranges from Yatsushiro in Higo Province (present-day Kumamoto). This opinion is the most popular. The fruit has become a specialty of Satsuma because Naotomo Yamaguchi, Tokugawa Ieyasu's retainer, admired its great flavour. In 1603, it was presented to Tokugawa Ieyasu by Shimazu Tadatsune, tozama daimyō of Satsuma. In ancient times, it was referred to as "Mukoujima Mikan" or "Aka Mikan" but it started to be called "Sakurajima Mikan" around 1658.

== See also ==
- Citrus unshiu
- Kishu mikan
