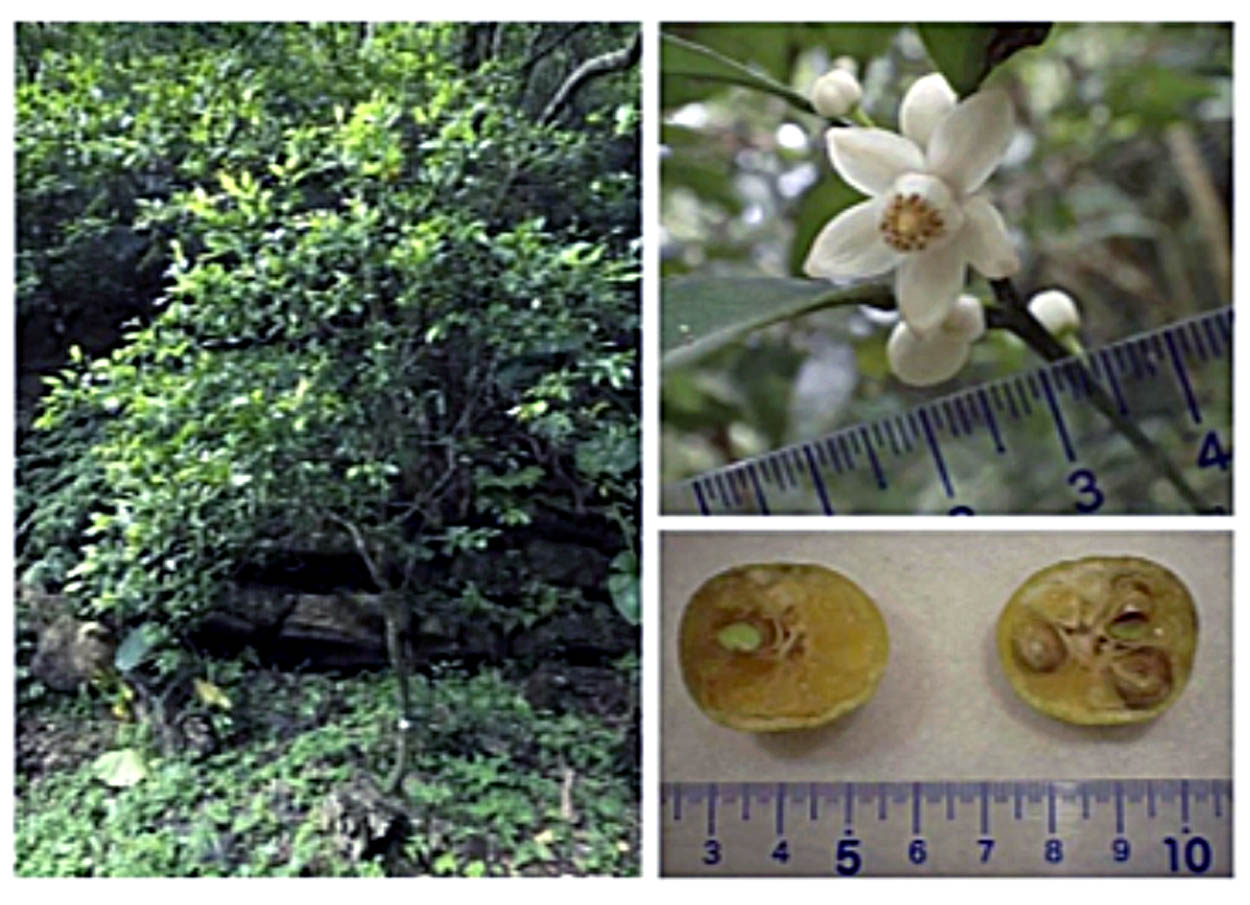
- Tree, flower and fruit of the tanibuta

Scientific classification
- Kingdom: Plantae
- Clade: Tracheophytes
- Clade: Angiosperms
- Clade: Eudicots
- Clade: Rosids
- Order: Sapindales
- Family: Rutaceae
- Genus: Citrus
- Species: C. ryukyuensis

Binomial name
- Citrus ryukyuensis Wu, 2021

= Citrus ryukyuensis =

Ryukyu mandarin

Species of plant

Citrus ryukyuensis, also known as the tanibuta (Okinawan: タニブター, romanized: tanibutā, lit. 'big seed'), is a newly characterized wild citrus species native to the Ryukyus and adjacent islands, most closely related to the mainland mandarin orange, C. reticulata. As with other citrus, it is a member of the Rutaceae family. The Ryukyu and mainland species have diverged for more than 2 million years, and unlike the mainland mandarin, the Ryukyu mandarin reproduces sexually. Its hybridization with the mainland species has given rise to the unique mandarin hybrids of the islands.

== Discovery and characterization ==
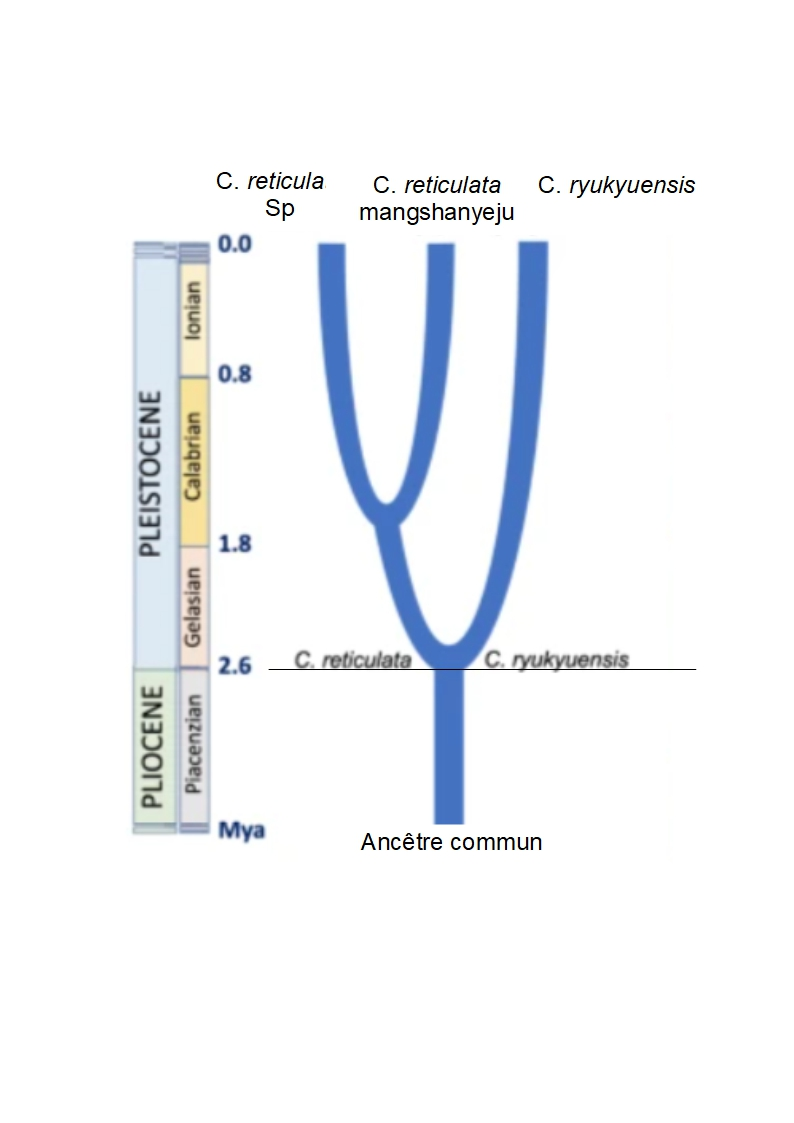
Divergence of C. ryukyuensis from C. reticulata

Previous genetic studies that characterized the mandarin oranges of the Asian mainland left unexplained the unusual genetic characteristics of those from Japan and nearby islands. A followup study designed at filling this gap in understanding produced an unexpected result, the identification of a pure wild species of mandarin, the hybridization of which with the mainland species has given rise to multiple distinct mandarin orange hybrid clusters. Because the identified specimens were native to the Ryukyu islands, the species was named C. ryukyuensis. Comparison with C. reticulata showed a calculated divergence time from mainland citrus between 2.2 and 2.8 million years ago, roughly corresponding to a Pleistocene era sea level rise that would have cut off the islands, providing the isolation necessary for speciation. As a consequence of this isolation, the Ryukyu mandarin continued to reproduce sexually, while the mainland species experienced a genetic mutation that eventually spread throughout the mainland species and allowed them to reproduce asexually by apomixis.

== Hybrids ==
C. ryukyuensis persists to the present, but is also of importance due to its contribution to Japanese and neighboring island mandarin hybrids.

=== Tachibana ===
Beginning between 40,000 and 200,000 years ago, either a subsequent sea level fall or oceanic dispersal brought the Ryukyu species back into contact with mainland mandarins, and they interbred, producing different groupings of related hybrids. In one case, a mainland mandarin hybrid with similar contribution from the northern and southern mainland subspecies, and already containing some introgressed DNA from the Ryukyu mandarin but no introgressed pomelo DNA like that found in most mainland mandarins, would form numerous crosses with the Ryukyu species. The mainland orange passed to its progeny the mutation allowing asexual reproduction, producing a cluster of similar clonal Tachibana orange cultivars.

=== Shiikuwasha ===
Separately from the hybridizations that produced the tachibana, a mainland clonal lineage that can still be found on Okinawa, similar to the Chinese Sun Chu Sha mandarin but with added pomelo introgression, interbred with the Ryukyu species to produce the shiikuwasha. It again is a cluster of similar hybrids and not a single uniform cultivar. Like the tachibana, these lines inherited the ability to propagate clonally from their mainland parent, but while the tachibana all have the mainland mandarin as seed parent, different shiikuwasha clones have each of the parent species as their seed parent. The diversity of both groups of clones, the fact that they are both found growing in the wild, and the mention of both in the early poetry of the Japanese and Ryukyu kingdoms suggests that these hybridization events occurred spontaneously in nature.

=== Other hybrids ===
The third important group of Ryukyu mandarin clones, referred to as yukunibu, derive instead from a cross with a kunenbo-type mandarin orange with higher levels of pomelo introgression, probably introduced agriculturally from South-East Asia or Indonesia in historical times. The Ryukyu mandarin has also contributed to more complex citrus hybrids, such as the rokugatsu, a bitter orange/Ryukyu mandarin cross, and the deedee, a shiikuwasha/pomelo cross.
