= Kinokuniya Bunzaemon =

Japanese merchant

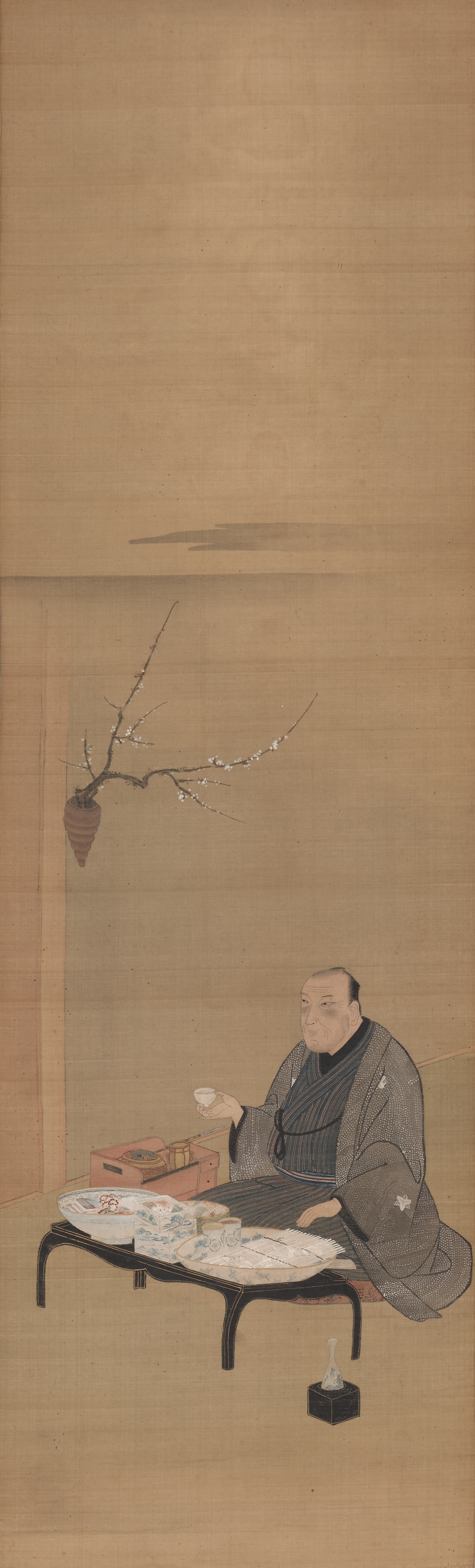
- Born: 1669
- Died: 1734

Kinokuniya Bunzaemon (紀伊国屋文左衛門; Japanese pronunciation: [kʲi.no.kɯ.ɲi.ja (|) bɯn.dzaꜜ.e.moɴ, -bɯꜜn.dza-], 1669 – 1734), or Kibun (紀文; [kʲi.bɯɴ]) for short, was a Japanese merchant of the Edo period born in Yuasa, Kishū who specialized in citrus, lumber, and salmon, among other goods. He enjoyed the favoritism and protection of shogunal advisor Yanagisawa Yoshiyasu and shogunal minister of finances Ogura Shigehide, and made a sizable fortune as a result. When these two retired, so did Kinokuniya.

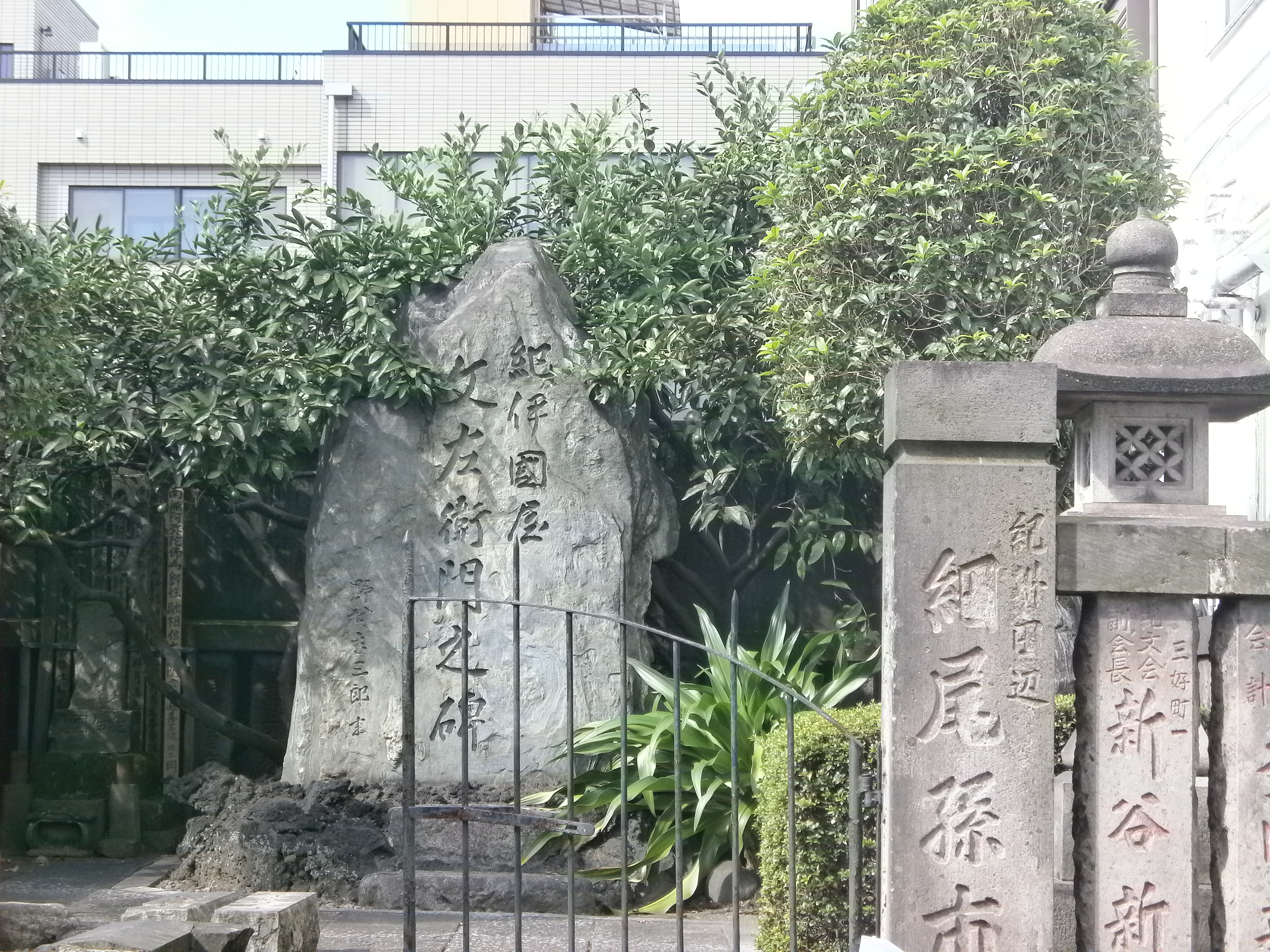
His grave, shaded by kinokuni citrus trees.
