= Mandarine Napoléon =

Sweet, orange liqueur made from mandarin oranges and cognac

- Type: Liqueur
- Manufacturer: DeKuyper Royal Distillers
- Origin: Belgium
- Introduced: 1892
- Alcohol by volume: 38%
- Colour: Orange
- Ingredients: mandarins, eau de vie
- Website: www.mandarine-napoleon.com

Mandarine Napoléon is a Belgian brand of liqueur, made from Andalusian mandarin oranges and cognac, from a recipe dating from the 19th century. It is primarily used in cocktails, but can also be drunk neat.

== History ==
Antoine-François Fourcroy, a chemist and member of the Council of State under Napoleon Bonaparte, is credited with first having the idea of macerating mandarins and tangerines, and then blending the result with cognac. His diaries describe both himself and Napoleon drinking the concoction together. However the exact recipe was subsequently lost.

== Commercialisation ==
In 1892, Belgian chemist Louis Schmidt rediscovered the recipe, and decided to create a liqueur based upon it. First marketed as Mandarine Napoléon: Grande Liqueur Impériale, it was predominantly distributed in France before seeing worldwide distribution later in the 20th Century. The Schmidt distillery closed after the Second World War and ownership of the drink passed to Fourcroy SA, coincidentally named after the drink's original creator.

Mandarine Napoléon is produced at the Distillerie de Biercée in Biercée, Belgium. The brand, formerly owned by ETS Fourcroy SA, was purchased by DeKuyper in September 2009.
