= Nanfengmiju =

Citrus fruit and plant

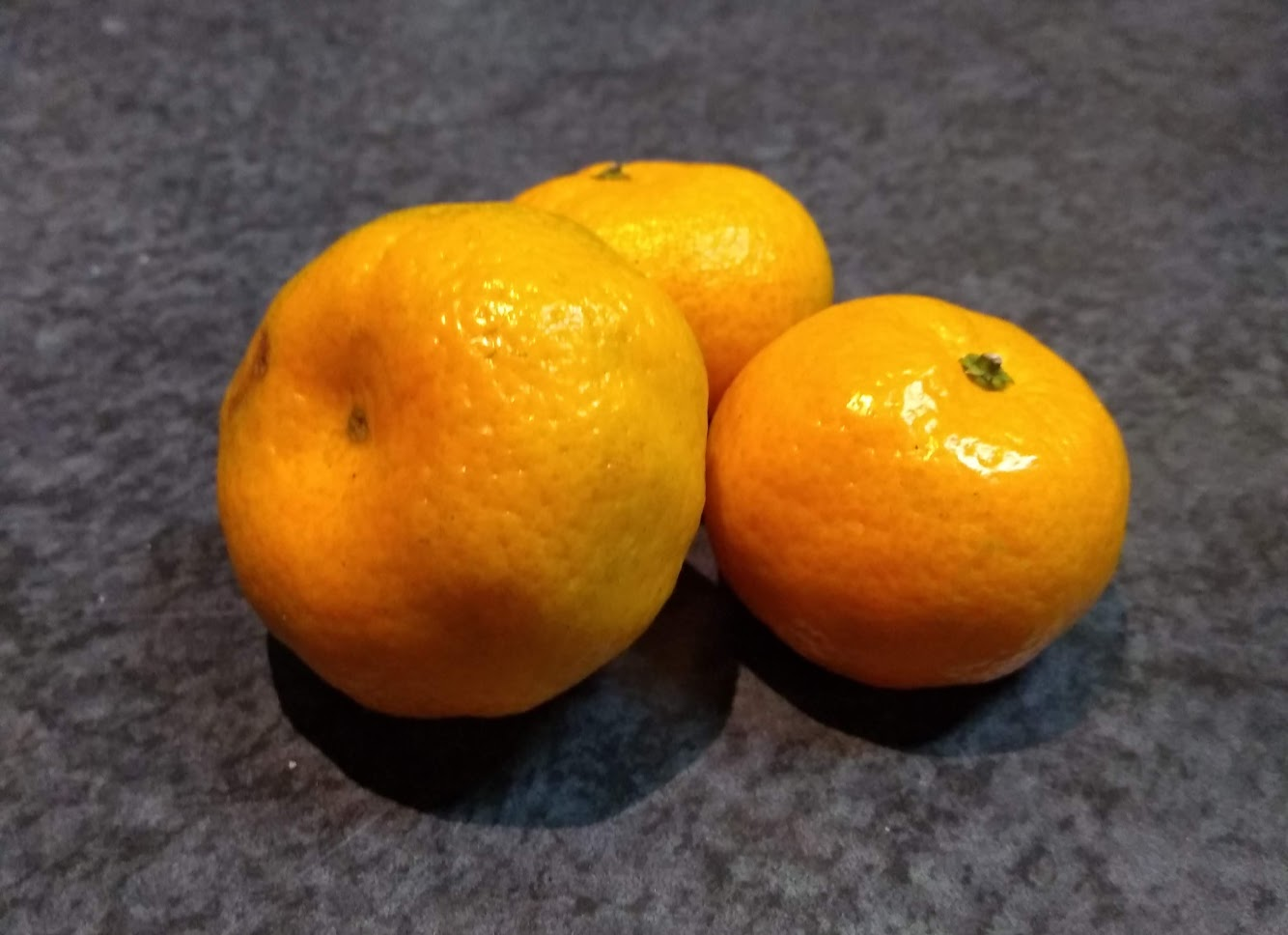
- Genus: Citrus
- Species: Citrus reticulata
- Cultivar: Nanfengmiju

Nanfengmiju
- Traditional Chinese: 南豐蜜桔
- Simplified Chinese: 南丰蜜桔
Transcriptions
Standard Mandarin
- Hanyu Pinyin: nánfēngmìjú
- IPA: [nǎnfə́ŋmîtɕy̌]

The Nanfengmiju (Citrus reticulata 'Nanfengmiju') is a rare non-hybrid citrus.

A small, sweet fruit, it is one of the most widely cultivated varieties of mandarin orange in China. It is thought to be a descendant of the Tang and Song dynasty ruju, and related to the Japanese kishu, which is now also grown and sold in North America. Genetically, it is identical to the kishu.
