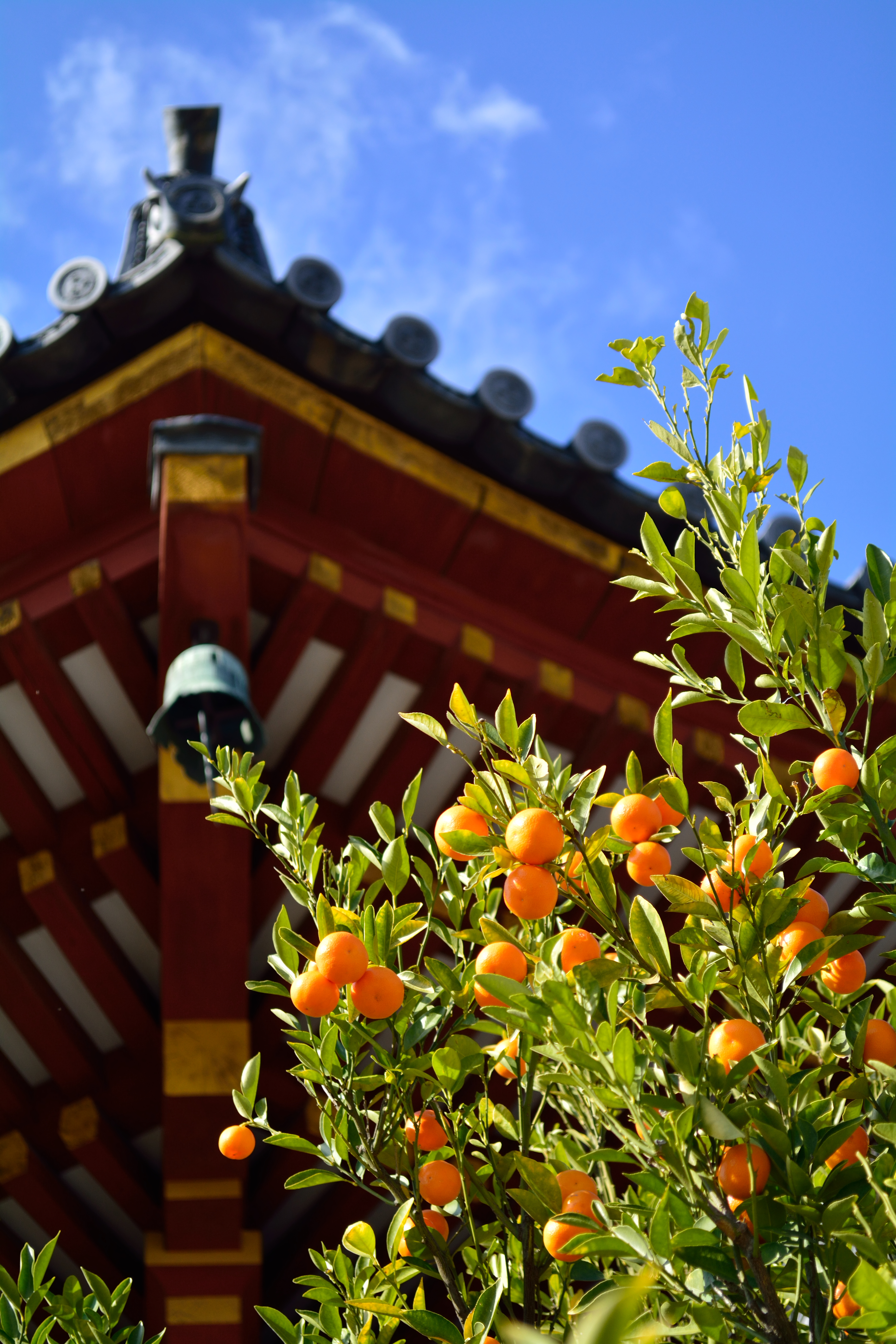
- A Tachibana orange tree with fruit at Kofuku-ji, Nara

Scientific classification
- Kingdom: Plantae
- Clade: Tracheophytes
- Clade: Angiosperms
- Clade: Eudicots
- Clade: Rosids
- Order: Sapindales
- Family: Rutaceae
- Genus: Citrus
- Species: C. × tachibana

Binomial name
- Citrus × tachibana (Makino) Yu.Tanaka

Synonyms
- Citrus reticulata subsp. tachibana D.Rivera, Obón, S.Ríos, Selma, F.Mendez, Verde & F.Cano

= Tachibana orange =

Citrus fruit and plant

The tachibana orange (Citrus × tachibana, or Citrus reticulata subsp. tachibana) is a variety of mandarin orange, a citrus fruit. They grow wild in the forests of Japan and are referred to in the poetry of the early Japanese and Ryukyu Islands kingdoms. The Tanaka System assigns them their own species, while the Swingle System places them in the same species with other mandarin oranges.

Genomic analysis has shown tachibana oranges to be a constellation of distinct natural F1 hybrids that cross the pure Ryukyu Island mandarin C. ryukyuensis with mainland Asian C. reticulata that was itself a hybrid of northern and southern subspecies, but also contained some prior Ryukyu mandarin introgression. They lack the pomelo introgression found in the closely related domesticated mandarin oranges of mainland Asia, though they have a mainland-mandarin-derived transposable element insertion that causes them to reproduce asexually by apomixis, unlike their sexually-reproducing Ryukyu mandarin parent. This distinctive island parent is estimated to have diverged from mainland Asian mandarins, probably arising before 2 million years ago near where its mandarin cousins would later be domesticated in the Nanling Mountains of China, and likely spread to the islands over land bridges formed during Pleistocene glacial maxima, Rising sea levels provided the isolation that led to speciation, then either a subsequent fall in sea level or oceanic dispersal by rafting reestablished contact to allow for natural hybridization between the island and mainland mandarins between 40,000 and 200,000 years ago, giving rise to the tachibana oranges.
