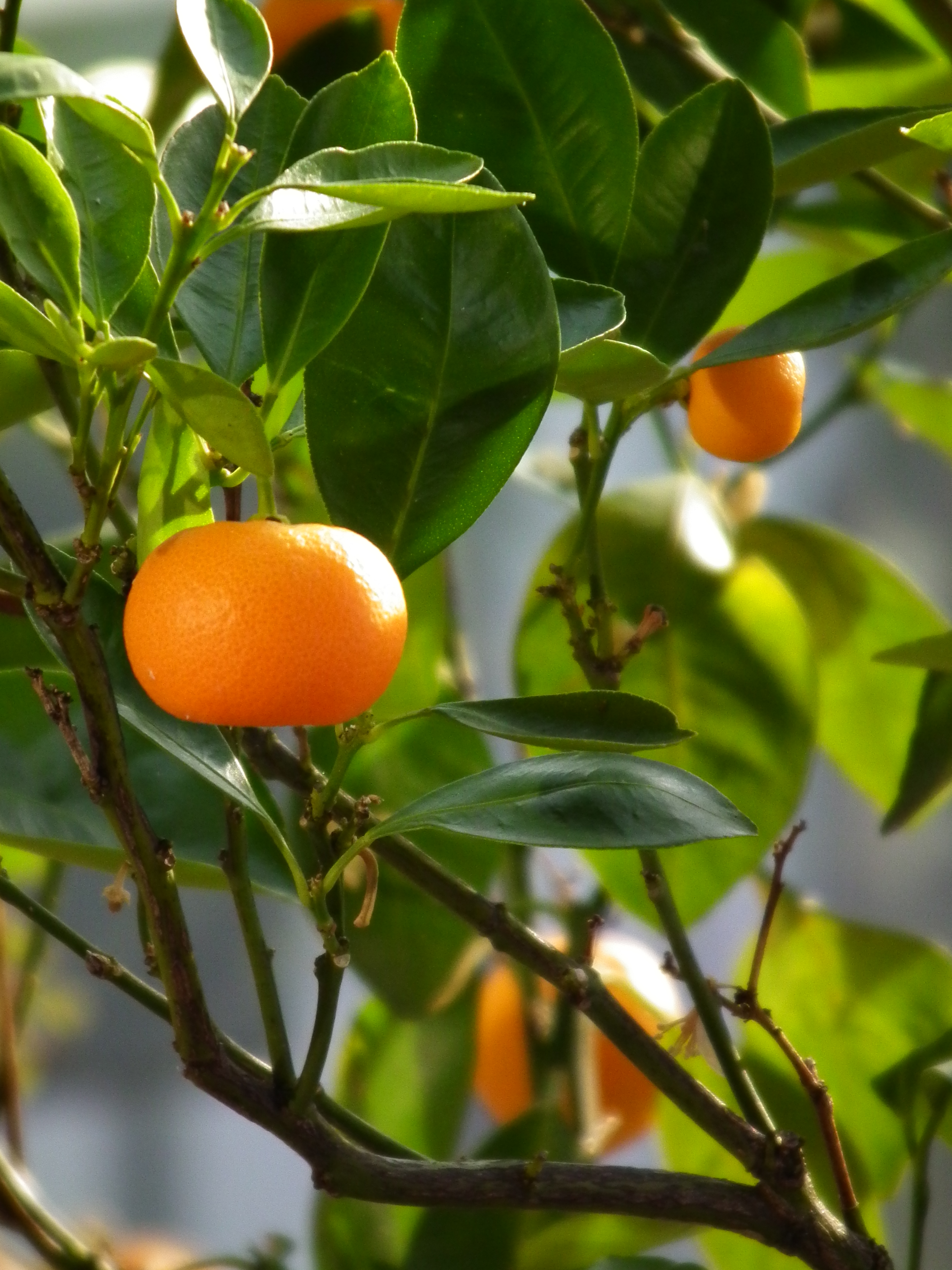

Scientific classification
- Kingdom: Plantae
- Clade: Tracheophytes
- Clade: Angiosperms
- Clade: Eudicots
- Clade: Rosids
- Order: Sapindales
- Family: Rutaceae
- Genus: Citrus
- Species: C. reticulata

Binomial name
- Citrus reticulata Blanco, 1837

= Mandarin orange =

Small citrus fruit

A mandarin orange (Citrus reticulata), often simply called mandarin, is a small, rounded citrus tree fruit, which is usually eaten plain or in fruit salads. The mandarin is small and oblate, unlike the roughly spherical sweet orange (which is a mandarin-pomelo hybrid). The taste is sweeter and stronger than the common orange. A ripe mandarin orange is firm to slightly soft, heavy for its size, and pebbly-skinned. The peel is thin and loose, with little white mesocarp, so they are usually easier to peel and to split into segments. Hybrids have these traits to lesser degrees. The mandarin orange is tender and is damaged easily by cold. It can be grown in tropical and subtropical areas.

According to genetic studies, the wild mandarin was one of the original citrus species; through breeding or natural hybridization, it is the ancestor of many hybrid citrus cultivars. With the citron and pomelo, it is the ancestor of the most commercially important hybrids. Though the ancestral mandarin orange was bitter, most commercial mandarin strains derive from hybridization with the pomelo, which gives them sweet fruit.

== Etymology ==
The name mandarin orange is a calque of Swedish mandarin apelsin [apelsin from German Apfelsine (Apfel + Sina), meaning Chinese apple], first attested in the 18th century. The Imperial Chinese term "mandarine" was first adopted by the French for this fruit. The reason for the epithet is not clear.

Citrus reticulata is from Latin, where reticulata means "netted".

== Description ==
=== Tree ===
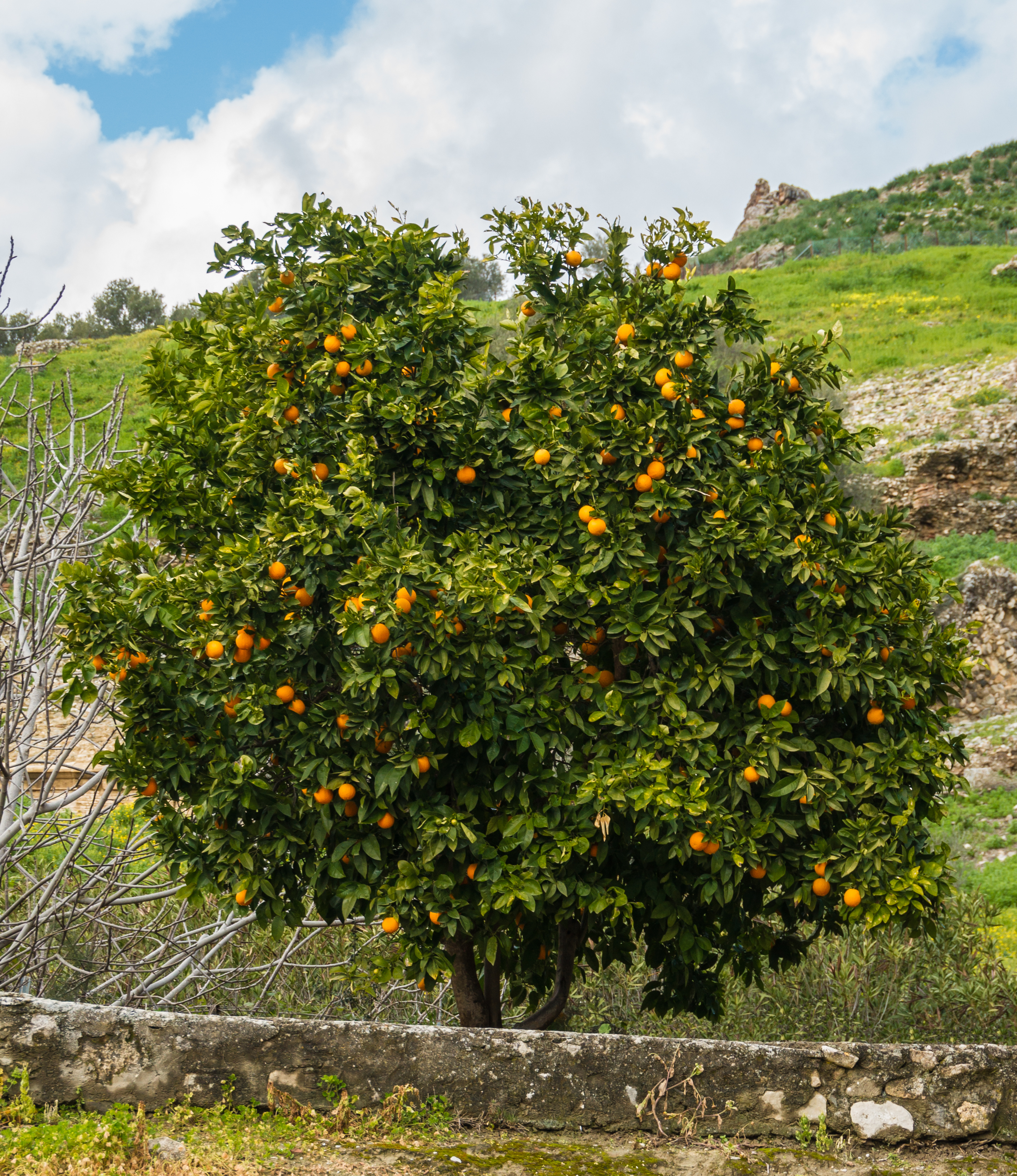
Fruiting mandarin tree in Crete

Citrus reticulata is a moderate-sized tree some 7.6 meters (25 ft) in height. The tree trunk and major branches have thorns. The leaves are shiny, green, and rather small. The petioles are short, almost wingless or slightly winged. The flowers are borne singly or in small groups in the leaf-axils. Citrus are usually self-fertile (needing only a bee to move pollen within the same flower) or parthenocarpic (not needing pollination and therefore seedless, such as the satsuma). A mature mandarin tree can yield up to 79 kilograms (175 lb) of fruit.

=== Fruit ===
Mandarin orange fruits are small 40–80 millimeters (1.6–3.1 in). Their color is orange, yellow-orange, or red-orange. The skin is thin and peels off easily. Their easiness to peel is an important advantage of mandarin oranges over other citrus fruits. Just like with other citrus fruits, mandarin is separated easily from the segments. The fruits may be seedless or contain a small number of seeds. Though the ancestral mandarin orange was bitter, most commercial mandarin strains derive from hybridization with pomelo, which gives them sweet fruit. They can be eaten as whole or squeezed to make juice. A ripe mandarin orange is firm to slightly soft, heavy for its size, and pebbly-skinned. The peel is thin and loose, with little white mesocarp, so they are easy to peel and to split into segments.

== Genomics ==
In 2026, the Ponkan mandarin genome was reannotated as part of a haplotype-aware annotation study of three major Citrus crops. The updated annotation had a BUSCO completeness score of approximately 99.5%, and identified 25,162 protein-coding genes, 42,833 mRNAs, and 18,751 alternative-splicing events.

== Evolution ==
=== Origins ===
Many Citrus species are hybrids of mandarin and either citron or pomelo. Some mandarins are the original wild species, but most are hybrids.

The wild mandarin is one of the pure ancestral citrus taxa; they evolved in a restricted region of South China and Vietnam.

=== Domestication ===
Mandarins appear to have been domesticated at least twice, in the north and south Nanling Mountains, derived from separate wild subspecies. Wild mandarins are still found there, including Daoxian mandarines (sometimes given the species name Citrus daoxianensis) as well as some members of the group traditionally called 'Mangshan wild mandarins', a generic grouping for the wild mandarin-like fruit of the Mangshan area that includes both true mandarins (mangshanyeju, the southern subspecies) and the genetically distinct and only distantly-related Mangshanyegan. The wild mandarins were found free of the introgressed pomelo (C. maxima) DNA found in domestic mandarins. Still, they did appear to have small amounts (~1.8%) of introgression from the ichang papeda, which grows wild in the same region.

The Nanling Mountains are home to northern and southern genetic clusters of domestic mandarins that have similar levels of sugars in the fruit compared to their wild relatives but appreciably (in some almost 90-fold) lower levels of citric acid. The clusters display different patterns of pomelo introgression, have different deduced historical population histories, and are most closely related to distinct wild mandarins, suggesting two independent domestications in the north and south. All tested domesticated cultivars belong to one of these two genetic clusters, with varieties such as Nanfengmiju, Kishu, and Satsuma from the northern domestication event producing larger, redder fruit, while varieties such as Willowleaf, Dancy, Sunki, Cleopatra, King, and Ponkan belong to the smaller, yellower-fruited southern cluster.

=== Taxonomy ===
The Tanaka classification system divided domestic mandarins and similar fruit into numerous species, giving distinct names to cultivars such as willowleaf mandarins (C. deliciosa), satsumas (C. unshiu), tangerines (C. tangerina). Under the Swingle system, all these are considered to be varieties of a single species, Citrus reticulata. Hodgson represented them as several subgroups: common (C. reticulata), Satsuma, King (C. nobilis), Mediterranean (willowleaf), small-fruited (C. indica, C. tachibana and C. reshni), and mandarin hybrids. In the genomic-based species taxonomy of Ollitrault et al., only pure wild type mandarins would fall under C. reticulata, while the pomelo admixture found in the majority of mandarins would cause them to be classified as varieties of the hybrid bitter orange, C. aurantium.

Genetic analysis is consistent with continental mandarins representing a single species, varying due to hybridization. An island species, Citrus ryukyuensis that diverged 2 to 3 million years ago when cut off by rising sea levels, was found on Okinawa Island. Its hybridization with the mainland species has produced unique island cultivars in Japan and Taiwan, such as the Tachibana orange the Shekwasha, and Nanfengmiju. They have some pomelo DNA, like all domesticated mandarins. Northern and southern domesticates contain different pomelo contributions. An 'acidic' group including Sunki and Cleopatra mandarins likewise contain small regions of introgressed pomelo DNA; they are too sour to eat, but are widely used as rootstock and grown for juice. Another group, including some tangerines, satsuma, and king mandarins, show more pomelo contribution. Hybrid mandarins thus fall on a continuum of increasing pomelo contribution with clementines, sweet and sour oranges, and grapefruit.

== Production ==
In 2024, world production of mandarin oranges (combined with tangerines and clementines in reporting to FAOSTAT) was approximately 50 million tonnes, led by China with 51% of the total. Turkey produced two million tonnes in 2024, with Spain and Egypt as other significant producers.

== Uses ==
=== Nutrition ===
Mandarin orange, raw
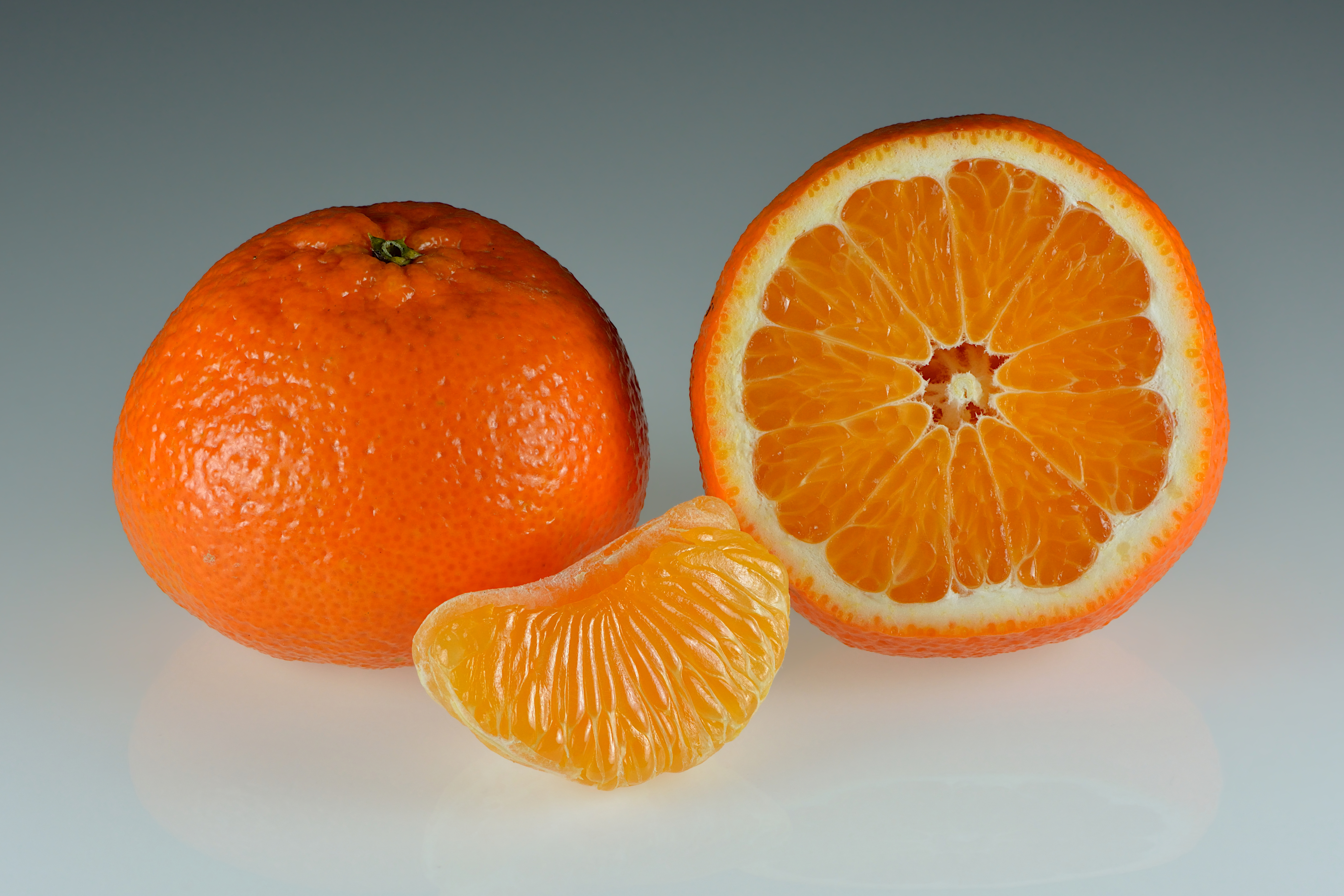

Nutritional value per 100 g (3.5 oz)
- Energy: 223 kJ (53 kcal)
- Carbohydrates: 13.34 g
- Sugars: 10.58 g
- Dietary fiber: 1.8 g
- Fat: 0.31 g
- Protein: 0.81 g
Vitamins and minerals
Vitamins	Quantity %DV^{†}
Vitamin A equiv. beta-Carotene	4% 34 μg 1% 155 μg
Thiamine (B1)	5% 0.058 mg
Riboflavin (B2)	3% 0.036 mg
Niacin (B3)	2% 0.376 mg
Pantothenic acid (B5)	4% 0.216 mg
Vitamin B6	5% 0.078 mg
Folate (B9)	4% 16 μg
Choline	2% 10.2 mg
Vitamin C	30% 26.7 mg
Vitamin E	1% 0.2 mg
Minerals	Quantity %DV^{†}
Calcium	3% 37 mg
Iron	1% 0.15 mg
Magnesium	3% 12 mg
Manganese	2% 0.039 mg
Phosphorus	2% 20 mg
Potassium	6% 166 mg
Sodium	0% 2 mg
Zinc	1% 0.07 mg
- Other constituents: Quantity
- Water: 85.2 g
- Link to USDA FoodData Central entry
- ^{†}Percentages estimated using US recommendations for adults, except for potassium, which is estimated based on expert recommendation from the National Academies.

A raw mandarin orange is 85% water, 13% carbohydrates, and contains negligible amounts of fat and protein (table). In a reference amount of 100 g (3.5 oz), a mandarin orange supplies 53 calories of food energy, and only vitamin C as 30% of the Daily Value, with all other micronutrients in low amounts (table).

=== Culinary ===
Mandarins have a stronger and sweeter taste than sweet oranges. They are peeled and eaten fresh or used in salads, desserts and main dishes. Fresh mandarins are used in the production of the liqueur Mandarine Napoléon.

The peel is used fresh, whole or as zest, or dried as chenpi. It can be used as a spice for cooking, baking, drinks, or candy. Essential oil from the fresh peel may be used as a flavoring for candy, in gelatins, ice cream, chewing gum, and baked goods. It is used as a flavoring in some liqueurs.

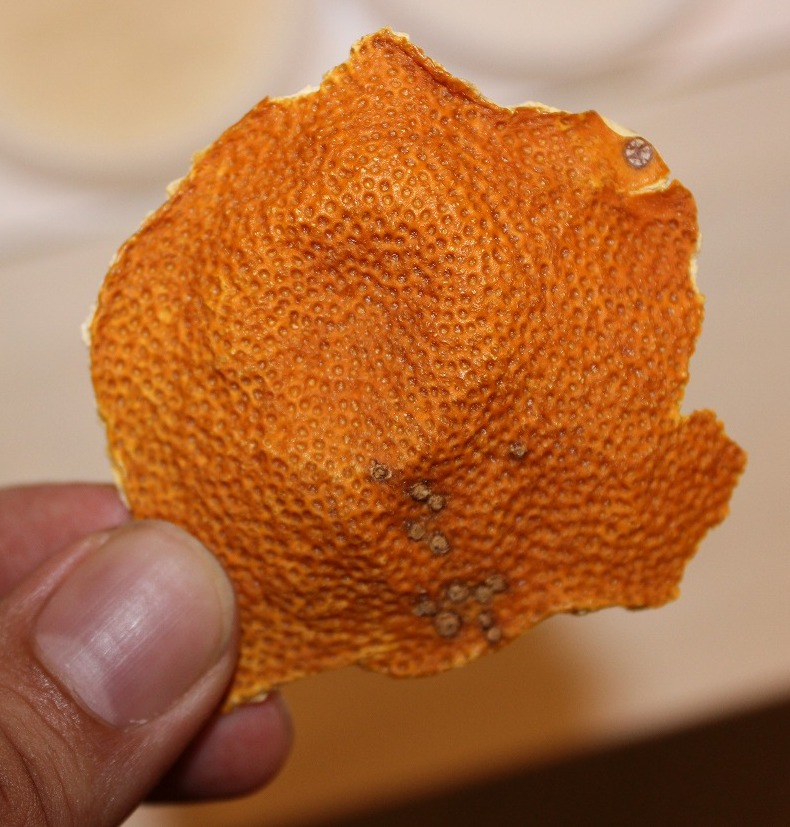
Dried mandarin peel used as a seasoning

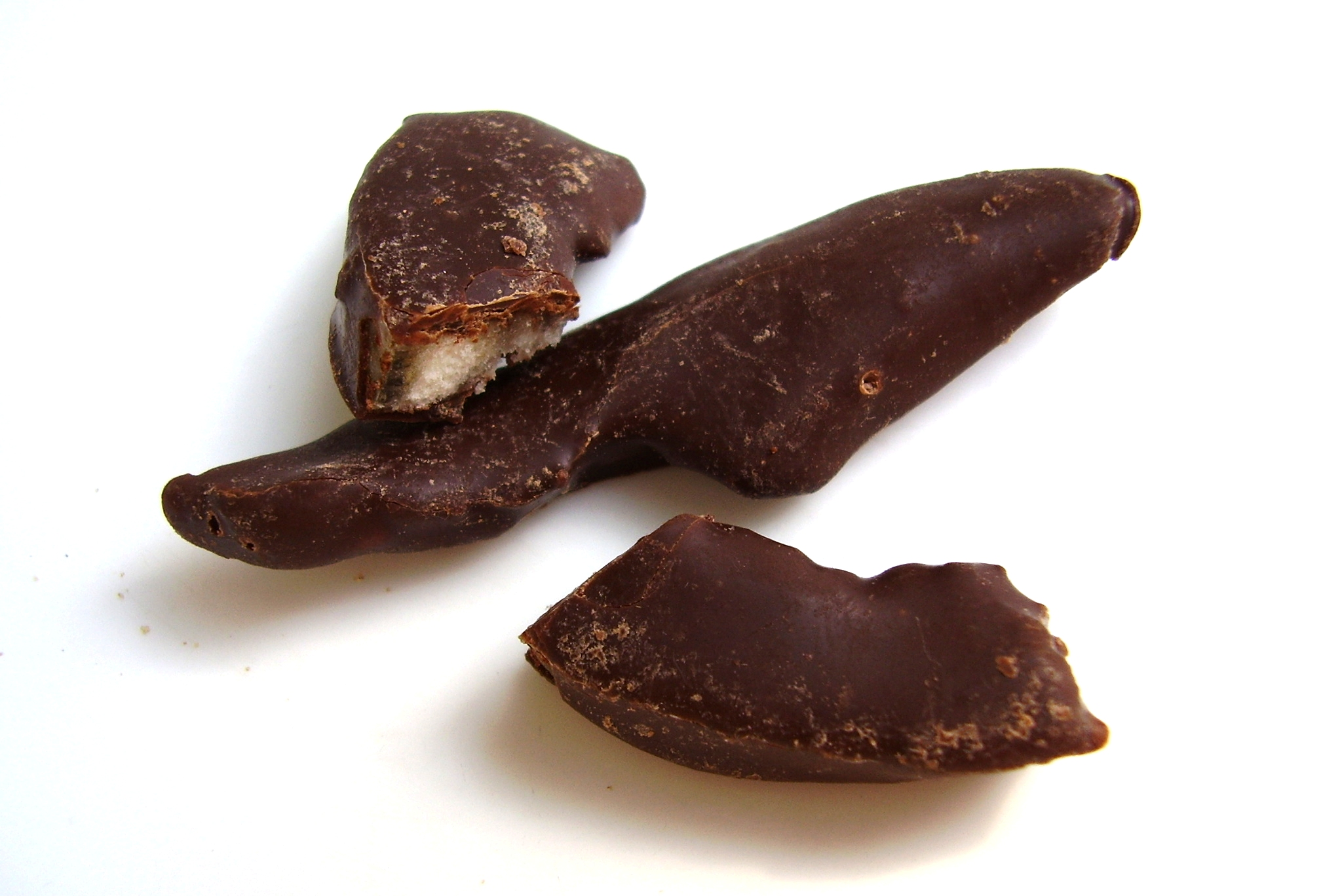
Chocolate-coated citrus peel

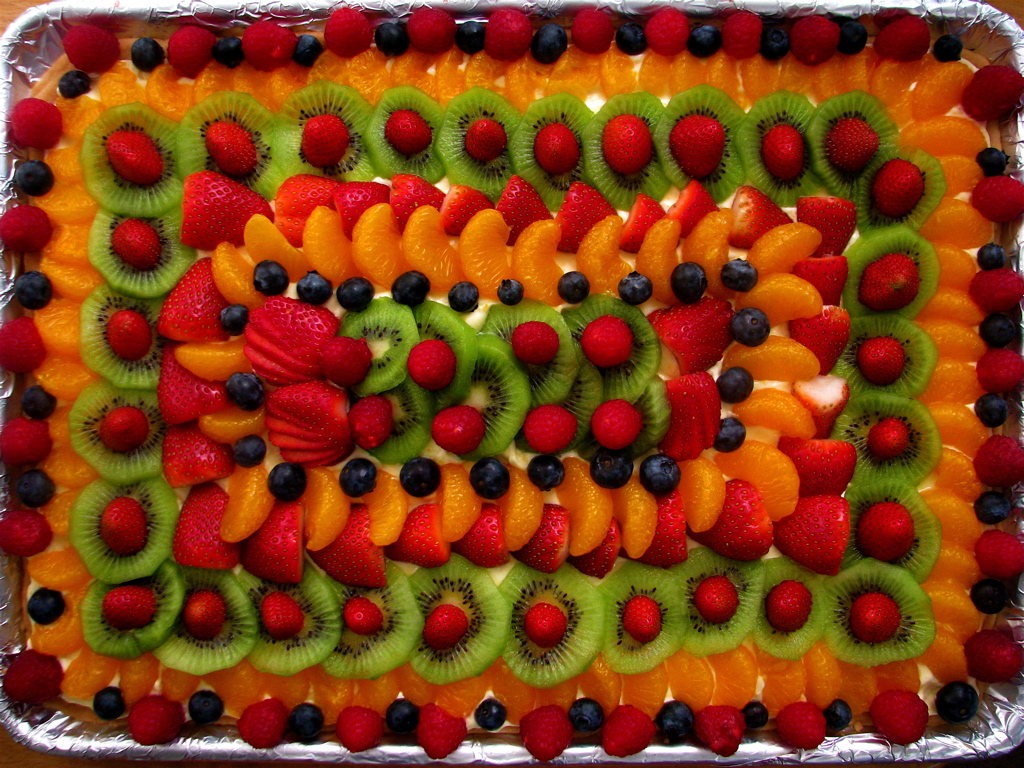
Mandarins in a fresh fruit salad

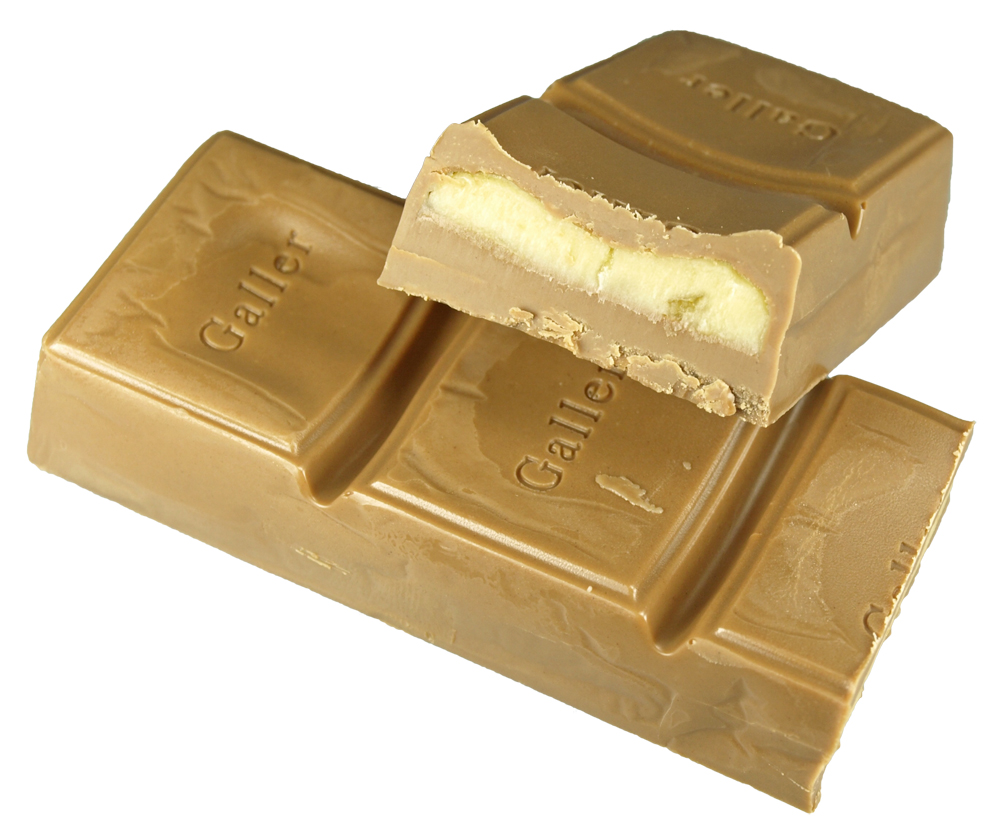
Chocolate flavored with Mandarine Napoléon

== Fruit rind oil ==
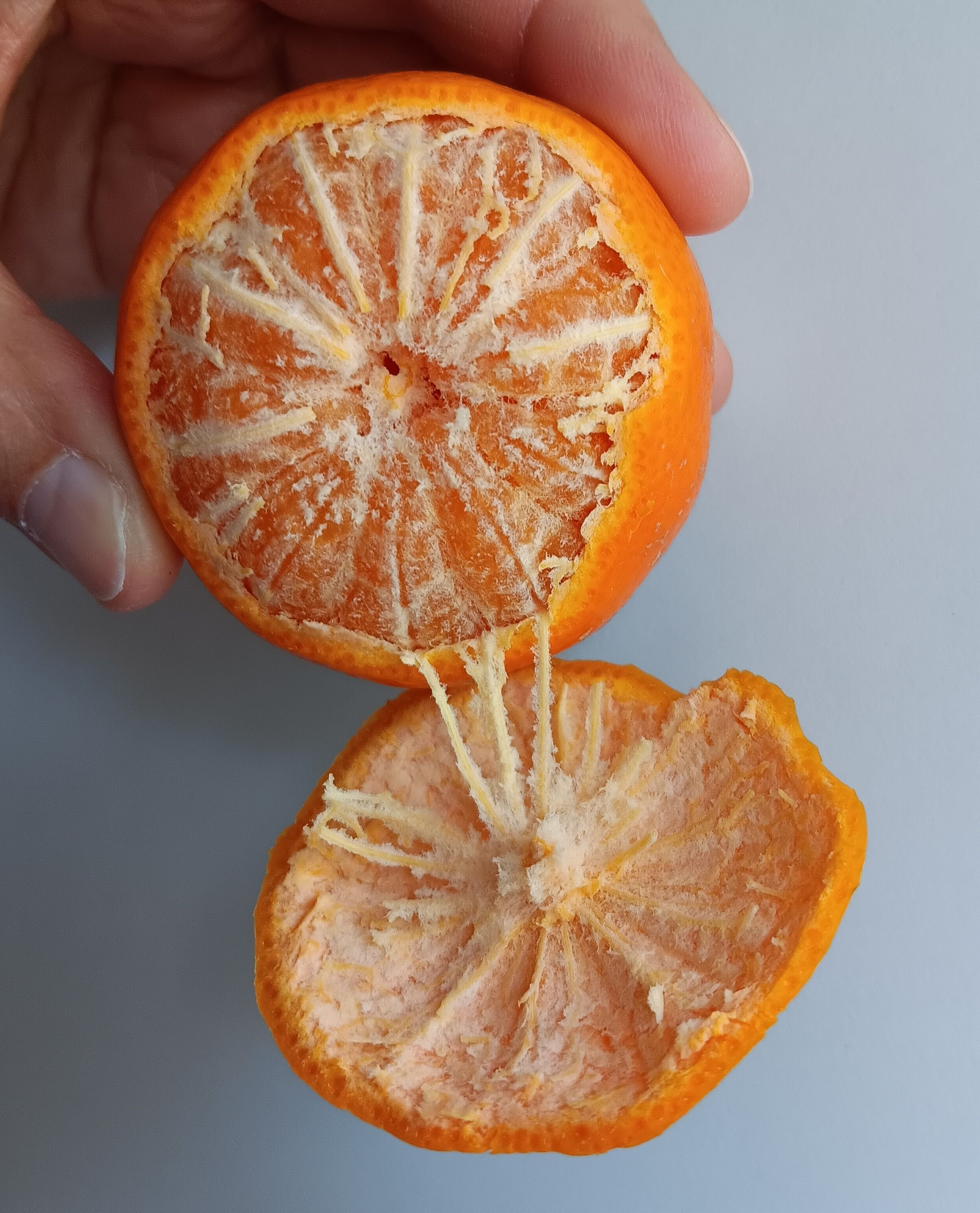
Mandarin with oil glands in the bark

The oils expressed from the peel/rind of mandarin are used as flavor and fragrance materials. Compositional differences arise from both cultivar and stage of fruit ripeness (green - unripe; yellow - partially ripe; and "red" - fully ripe). In general, the aroma of the peel oils are described as "citrus, floral, bitter orange, orange, terpenic, aldehydic, orange rind, neroli".

== Cultural significance ==
In North America, mandarins are commonly purchased in 5- or 10-pound boxes, individually wrapped in soft green paper, and given in Christmas stockings. This custom goes back to the 1880s when Japanese immigrants in Canada and the United States began receiving Japanese mandarin oranges from their families back home as gifts for the New Year. The tradition spread among the non-Japanese population and eastwards across the country: each November harvest, "The oranges were quickly unloaded and shipped east by rail. 'Orange Trains' – trains with boxcars painted orange – alerted everyone along the way that the irresistible oranges from Japan were back again for the holidays. For many, the arrival of Japanese mandarin oranges signalled the beginning of the holiday season." Satsumas were grown in the United States from the early 1900s. Still, Japan remained a major supplier. U.S. imports of these Japanese oranges was suspended due to hostilities with Japan during World War II. While they were one of the first Japanese goods allowed for export after the end of the war, residual hostility led to the rebranding of these oranges as "Mandarin" oranges instead of "Japanese" oranges.

The delivery of the first batch of mandarin oranges from Japan in the port of Vancouver is greeted with a festival that combines Santa Claus and Japanese dancers—young girls dressed in traditional kimonos. Historically, the Christmas fruit sold in North America was mostly Dancys, but now it is more often a hybrid. This Japanese tradition merged with European traditions related to the Christmas stocking. Saint Nicholas is said to have put gold coins into the stockings of three poor girls so that they would be able to afford to get married. Sometimes the story is told with gold balls instead of bags of gold, and oranges became a symbolic stand-in for these gold balls, and are put in Christmas stockings in Canada. Their use as Christmas gifts probably spread from the Japanese immigrant community. Mandarin oranges are mentioned in Sinclair Ross' 1942 novel, As for Me and My House, and his 1939 short story, Cornet at Night.

== See also ==
- List of citrus fruits
- Tangerine
