= Papeda (citrus) =

Citrus fruit and plant

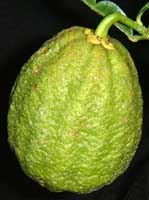
Ichang papeda

Papeda or papaeda is the common name for a group of Citrus species and varieties native to tropical Asia that are hardy and slow-growing, and produce unpalatable fruit. Walter Tennyson Swingle segregated these species into a separate subgenus, Papeda, that included the Ichang lemon, yuzu, kaffir lime, kabosu, sudachi, and a number of wild and uncultivated species and hybrids. Recent genetic analysis shows the papedas to be distributed among distinct branches of the Citrus phylogenetic tree, and hence Swingle's proposed subgenus is polyphyletic and not a valid taxonomic grouping, but the term persists as a common name.

Because of generally slow growth and bitter, less palatable fruits than in other citruses, papeda species have only limited commercial cultivation. Some species, like ichang papeda, are used in landscaping, while others are important for rootstocking and as genome source for breeding disease-resistant and frost-hardy citrus hybrids. In some cases the skin or leaves are used as a flavoring in Asian cuisine.

It is believed, based on molecular studies, that the citron, pomelo, mandarin and papedas were the ancestors of most hybrid citrus species and their varieties, which resulted from breeding or natural hybridization among the parental species. For example, the Key lime, a hybrid between a papeda, the micrantha, and a citron, has in turn given rise to many commercial types of limes.

== Classification ==
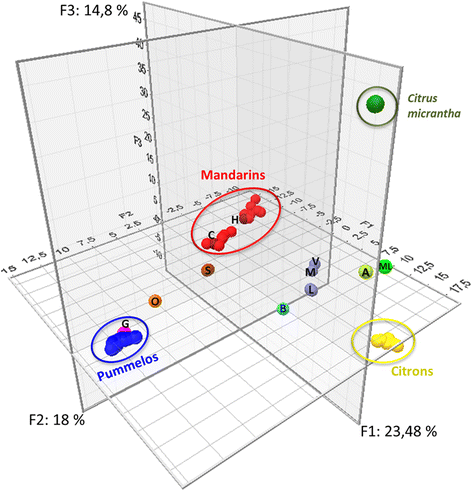
Citrus fruits clustered by genetic similarity (PCA of SNP diversity). Citrus micrantha (top right) is a papeda. Hybrids are expected to plot between their parents. ML: Mexican lime; A: alemow; V: Volkamer lemon; M: Meyer lemon; L: regular and "sweet" lemons; B: bergamot orange; H: haploid clementine; C: clementines; S: sour oranges; O: sweet oranges; G: grapefruits.

There are four species of Papeda currently recognised by Kew and the Missouri Botanical Garden. These are:

- Citrus cavaleriei – the Ichang papeda
- Citrus halimii – mountain citron
- Citrus latipes – khasi papeda
- Citrus hystrix – The kaffir lime or Mauritius papeda

There are many naturally occurring varieties that are now classified as subspecies:

- Citrus hystrix var. micrantha – small-flowered papeda (locally known as the biasong)
- Citrus hystrix var. microcarpa – small-fruited papeda (locally known as the samuyao)
- Citrus hystrix var. celebica – Celebes papeda
- Citrus hystrix var. macroptera – Melanesian papeda
- Citrus x aurantiifolia var. macrophylla – alemow
- Citrus x aurantiifolia var. webberi – kalpi
- Citrus longispina – winged lime (unresolved as to whether or not it is a hybrid, variety or species)

A number of hybrids between this subgenus and the subgenus Citrus also exist:

- Ichandarins
  - Yuzu (ichang papeda × mandarin)
  - Sudachi (ichang papeda × mandarin)
- Ichang lemon (ichang papeda × pomelo)
- Hyuganatsu (yuzu × pomelo, or yuzu sport)
- Kabosu (ichang papeda × bitter orange)–
