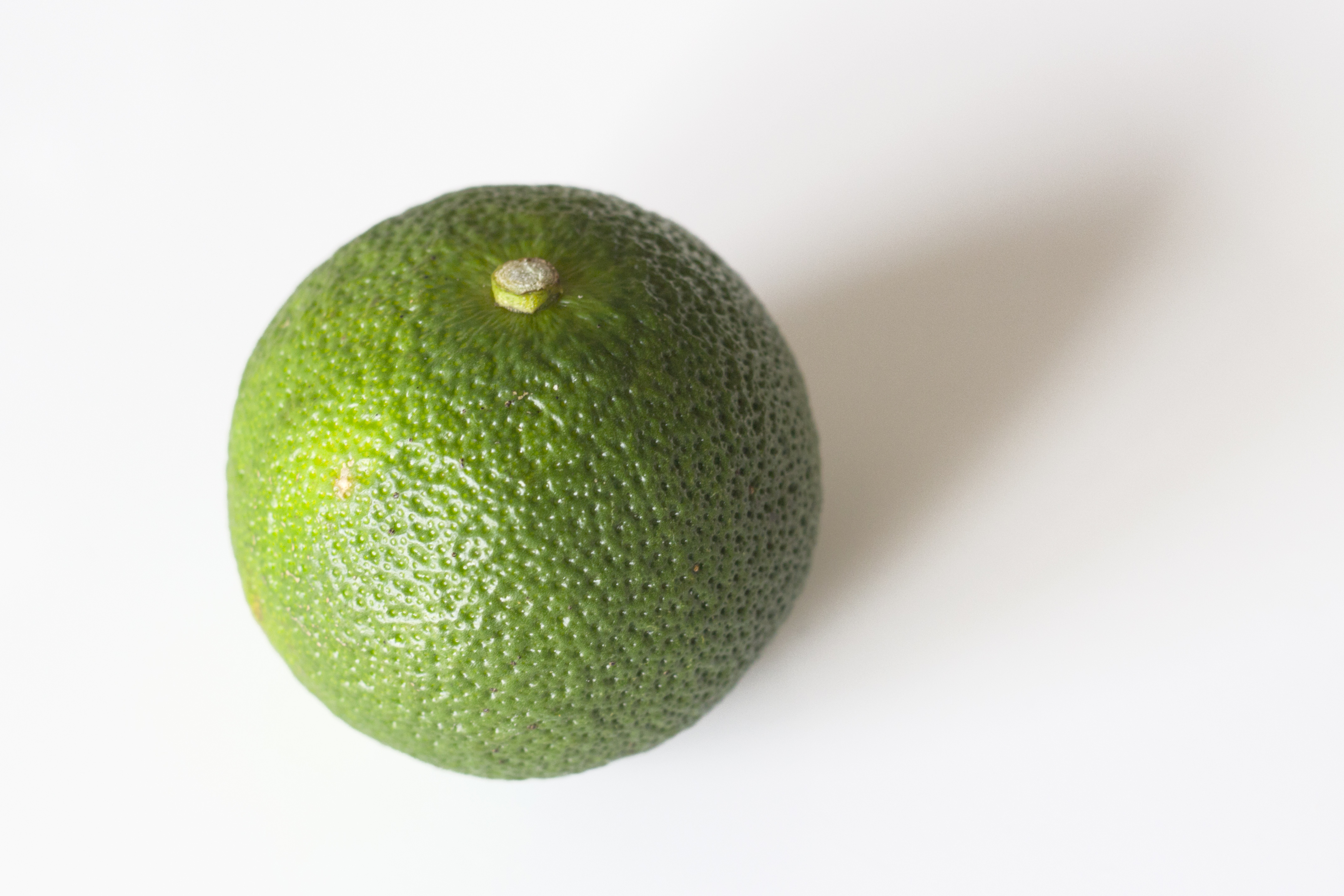
- 'Hebesu'

Scientific classification
- Kingdom: Plantae
- (unranked): Angiosperms
- (unranked): Eudicots
- (unranked): Rosids
- Order: Sapindales
- Family: Rutaceae
- Genus: Citrus
- Species: C. × hebesu

Binomial name
- Citrus × hebesu Hort. ex Fujita ,

= Hebesu =

'Hebesu'

Citrus fruit and plant

Hebesu or hebezu (平兵衛酢) is a small Japanese citrus fruit. It is green in color, rich in acid and reported to have high amounts of a specific flavonoid which supposedly has anti-cancer properties.

The fruit is considered a local delicacy of Hyūga, Miyazaki. It has been claimed it is similar to both kabosu (Citrus sphaerocarpa) and sudachi (Citrus sudach) but the fruit is not as well known outside Miyazaki Prefecture. Supposedly, the fruit was initially found during the Edo period by a Chōsokabe Heibei, from whom the fruit got its name (which means "Hebe's vinegar"). Chōsokabe began growing it on his land in what is now the Nishikawauchi Tomitaka area of Hyūga city.

Hebesu are grown in greenhouses are available from June, while those grown outdoor ship between the end of July until October.

The essential oils of the peel of the fruit have been studied, as well as an oxygen effects study.
