= Papeda =

Papeda may refer to:

- Papeda (food), a staple food of eastern Indonesia
- Papeda (citrus), common name for many unpalatable slow-growing Citrus, all formerly grouped as a single subgenus
  - Ichang Papeda, a genetically pure hardy species of citrus papeda
