= Citrus macrophylla =

Scientific classification
- Kingdom: Plantae
- Clade: Embryophytes
- Clade: Tracheophytes
- Clade: Spermatophytes
- Clade: Angiosperms
- Clade: Eudicots
- Clade: Rosids
- Order: Sapindales
- Family: Rutaceae
- Genus: Citrus
- Species: C. macrophylla

Binomial name
- Citrus macrophylla Wester

Citrus fruit and plant

Citrus macrophylla, also known as alemow, is a citrus tree and fruit, belonging to the papedas.

The trees are short in stature, more tropical in nature than most citrus, and are very spiny.

== Taxonomy ==
Alemow is rare and poorly studied, a likely hybrid between the citron and biasong (C. micrantha). The large fruits are considered inedible by local populations, though the plants are infrequently cultivated for medicinal and other uses. It has been tried in California as a possible rootstock for other citrus.
