= Citrus latipes =

Scientific classification
- Kingdom: Plantae
- Clade: Tracheophytes
- Clade: Angiosperms
- Clade: Eudicots
- Clade: Rosids
- Order: Sapindales
- Family: Rutaceae
- Genus: Citrus
- Species: C. latipes

Binomial name
- Citrus latipes (Swingle) Tanaka

Synonyms
- C. hystrix auct. non DC.

Species of citrus tree

Citrus latipes, commonly called "Khasi papeda", is sometimes mistakenly identified as Kaffir lime (C. hystrix). Native to Northeast India, the khasi papeda is a small, thorny tree that closely resembles both kaffir limes and ichang papedas (C. cavaleriei). Though rarely eaten, and extremely rare in cultivation, the fruit is edible.

== Medicinal uses ==
Fruits of C. latipes are used medicinally in Northeastern India "to treat stone problem".Locally, it is known as "Soh-Shyrkhoit" in the Khasi language (Soh = fruit, Shyrkhoit = monkey), meaning the fruit of a monkey.
