= Citrus longispina =

Scientific classification
- Kingdom: Plantae
- Clade: Tracheophytes
- Clade: Angiosperms
- Clade: Eudicots
- Clade: Rosids
- Order: Sapindales
- Family: Rutaceae
- Genus: Citrus
- Species: C. longispina

Binomial name
- Citrus longispina Wester

Citrus fruit and plant

Citrus longispina (winged lime, blacktwig lime, or megacarpa papeda) is an unusual sweet lime-like citrus that has been classed as a papeda.

It is called Tai la mi san in Chinese, Taramisan in Japanese and Tanisan or Talamisan in the Philippines.

== Description ==
Citrus longispina is an attractive citrus tree with striking colors: a background of dark-colored twigs, pale green leaves, and pale yellow fruit. Twigs are unusually dark brown, almost black, hence the name "blacktwig". The tree can reach eight feet (2.4 m) in height, and often has a spreading bushy appearance. Twigs are commonly long and bent down by the heavy fruit load.

Fruits comes in clusters and the flesh has a fair amount of natural sugar and a lime flavor. However it still lacks the intensity of acid found in more common citrus fruits, so some people might find it insipid. The fruit is spherical, about eight cm (3.1 in) in diameter. The tree has many long, strong thorns, as implicated from the botanical name, longispina.
