= Celebes (disambiguation) =

Celebes is the western name of Sulawesi, an island in Indonesia.

Celebes may also refer to:

- Celebes Sea, western Pacific Ocean
- Celebes TV, a local news television station in South Sulawesi, Indonesia
- The Elephant Celebes, a 1921 Surrealist work by Max Ernst
- HMS Celebes (1806), originally the Batavian Republic frigate Pallas
- Celebes papeda, Citrus celebica, a tree species native to Sulawesi
