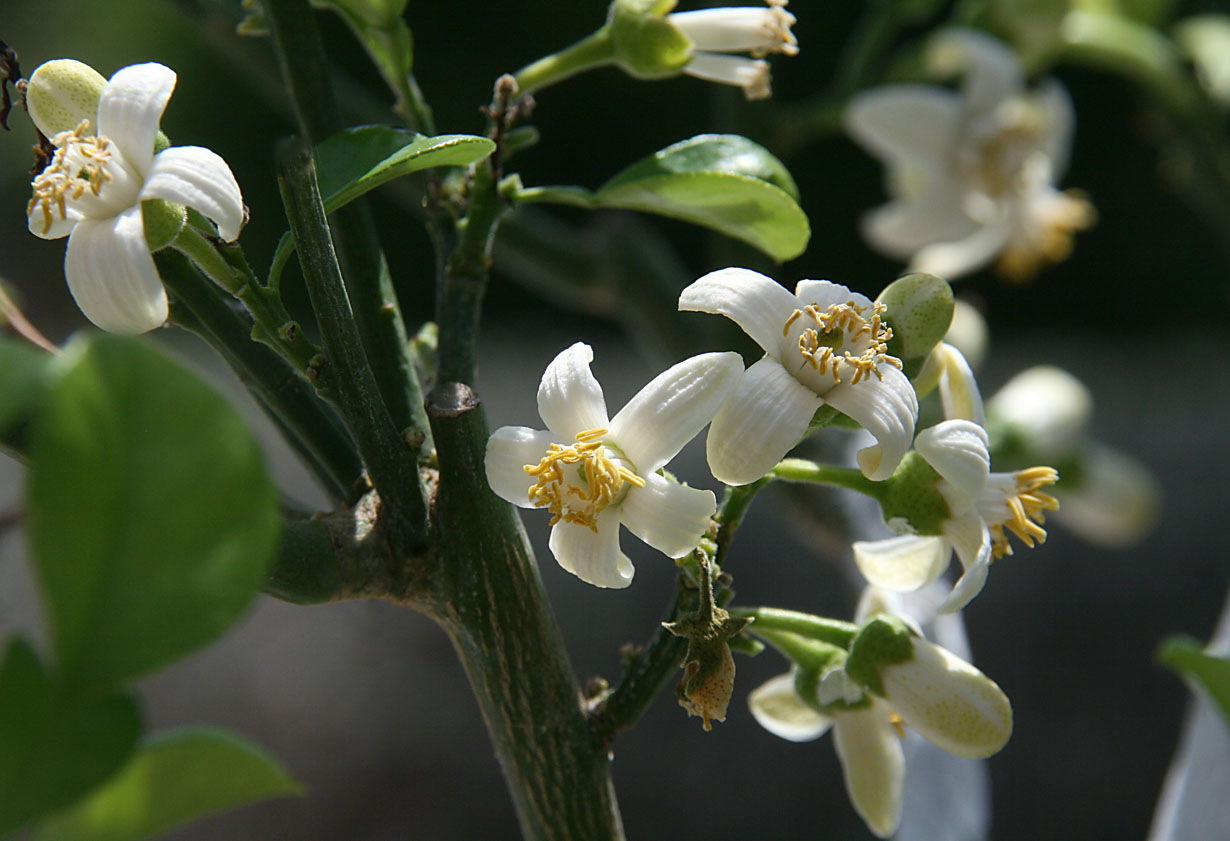

Scientific classification
- Kingdom: Plantae
- Clade: Tracheophytes
- Clade: Angiosperms
- Clade: Eudicots
- Clade: Rosids
- Order: Sapindales
- Family: Rutaceae
- Genus: Citrus
- Species: C. hystrix

Binomial name
- Citrus hystrix

Synonyms
- Citrus westeri Tanaka; Citrus micrantha Wester

= Micrantha (citrus) =

Citrus fruit and plant

The micrantha is a wild citrus from the papeda group, native to southern Philippines, particularly islands of Cebu and Bohol. Two varieties are recognized: small-flowered papeda (C. hystrix var. micrantha), locally known as biasong, and small-fruited papeda (C. hystrix var. microcarpa) or samuyao.

Although long viewed as a separate species, C. micrantha, it is now generally viewed to fall within Citrus hystrix, but genomic data on the latter is insufficient for a definitive conclusion. A micrantha was one of the progenitor species of some varieties of lime.

== Description ==
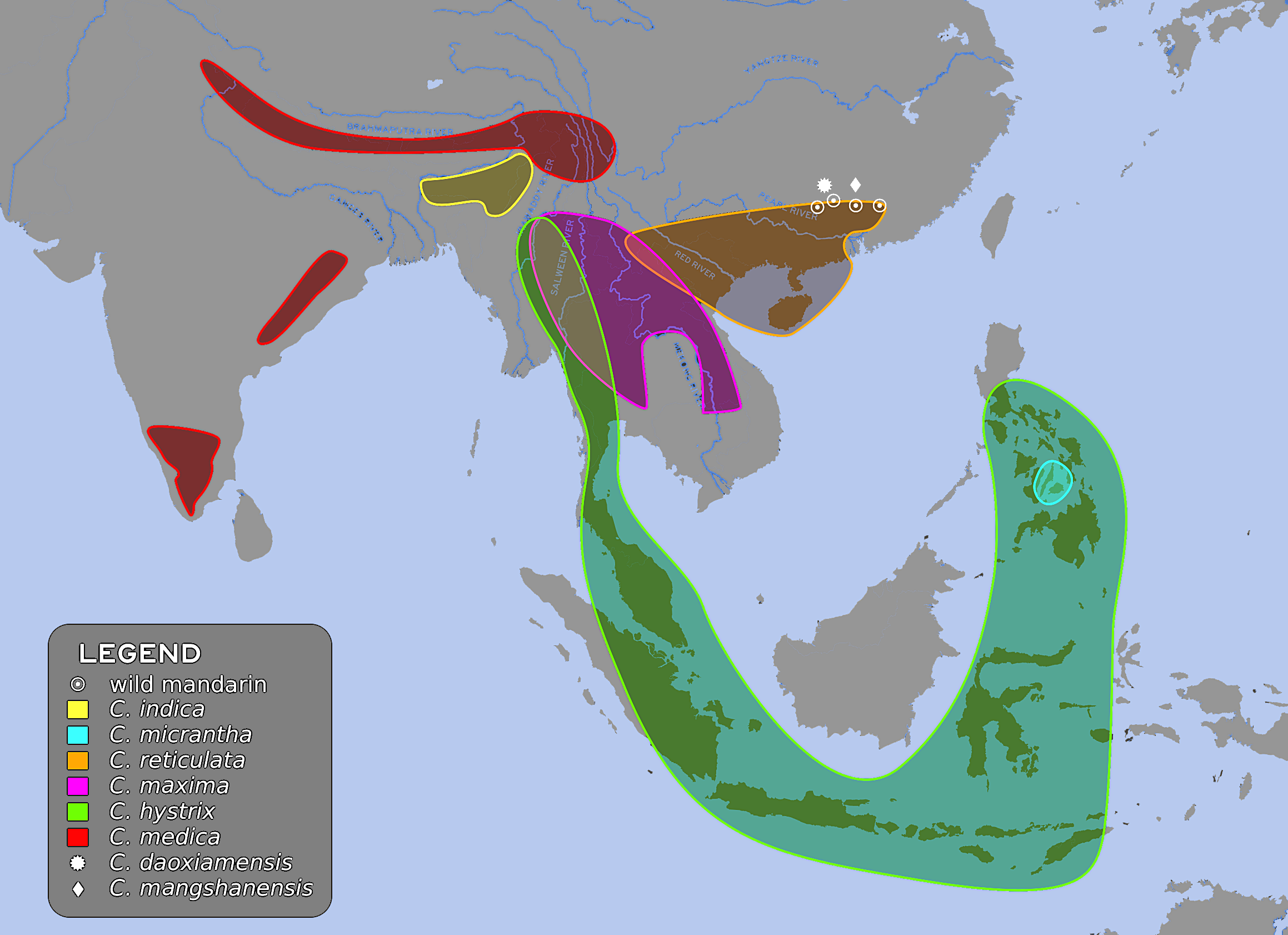
Map of inferred original wild ranges of the main Citrus cultivars, and selected relevant wild taxa

The micrantha was first described to Western science in 1915 by Peter Jansen Wester, who worked for the Philippine Bureau of Agriculture at the time.

=== Biasong ===
Wester collected ripe fruit specimens of biasong (small-flowered papeda, Citrus hystrix var. micrantha) on islands of Cebu, Bohol, Dumaguete, Negros, and in the Zamboanga and Misamis provinces in Mindanao. The fruits were collected throughout the year, indicating that the plant is ever-bearing. Biasong is characterized by small flowers (thus the "small-flowered" moniker) with fewer stamens than other papedas and oblong-obovate, few-loculed fruits. Though the fruit is not eaten and with little economic importance, its juice is used as a souring agent for kinilaw, or for hair-washing.

Biasong's aroma is similar to that of the samuyao variety of micrantha. The tree reaches 7.5 to 9 metres (25 to 30 ft) in height. Leaves are 9–12 cm (3.5–4.7 in) long, 2.7–4.0 cm (1.1–1.6 in) wide, broadly elliptical to ovate, crenate, thin, with base rounded or broadly acute; apex acutely blunt pointed. Petioles are 3.5–6 cm (1.4–2.4 in) long, broadly winged, up to 4 cm (1.6 in) wide, with wings (phyllodes) sometimes larger than the leaf. Flowers are small, four-petaled, white with a thin purple edge, 12–13 mm (0.47–0.51 in) in diameter, forming cymes of two to five. There are 15 to 17 equal stamens. The ovary is obovoid, with 6 to 8 slender, distinct locules. Fruits are obovate to oblong-obovate, 5–7 cm (2.0–2.8 in) long, with diameter of 3–4 cm (1.2–1.6 in), averaging 26 g (0.92 oz) in weight; their skin is rather thick, lemon-yellow, fairly smooth or with transverse corrugations; the pulp is juicy, grayish and acid, while juice cells are short and blunt to long, long, slender and pointed, sometimes containing a minute, greenish nucleus. They have numerous flat, pointed, reticulate seeds.

=== Samuyao ===
Wester collected ripe samuyao (small-fruited papeda, Citrus hystrix var. microcarpa) fruit specimens from cultivation in Cebu and Bohol in June, and from November to February. Samuyao is rather smaller than biasong, with trees attaining 4.5 meters. It has small, thin leaves and flowers comparable in size to biasong. The fruit, 15–20 mm in diameter, is likely to be the smallest in the whole genus. Wester also recorded a somewhat more vigorous variety, called "samuyao-sa-amoo" in Bohol, with slightly larger fruits; there is a possibility that this species was actually Limonellus aurarius, described by Georg Eberhard Rumphius back in 1741 in a nearby area, although his description also fits a number of related species. Wester gave the botanical description:

A shrubby tree, 4.5 meters tall, with slender branches and small, weak spines; leaves 55 to 80 millimeters long, 20 to 25 millimeters broad, ovate to ovate-oblong or elliptical, crenulate, thin, of distinct fragrance, base rounded to broadly acute; apex obtuse, sometimes notched, petioles 20 to 30 millimeters long, broadly winged, about 14 millimeters wide, wing area somewhat less than one-half of the leaf blade; flowers in compact axillary or terminal cymes, 2 to 7, small, 5 to 9 millimeters in diameter, white, with trace of purple on the outside; calyx small, not cupped, petals 3 to 5; stamens 15 to 18, free, equal; ovary very small, globose to obovate; locules 7 to 9, style distinct; stigma small, knob like; fruit 15 to 20 millimeters in diameter, roundish in outline; base sometimes nippled; apex an irregular, wrinkly cavity; surface corrugate, greenish lemon yellow; oil cells usually sunken; skin very thin; pulp fairly juicy, acid, bitter with distinct aroma; juice cells very minute, blunt, containing a small, greenish nucleus; seeds small, flattened, sometimes beaked.

Clear, intensely fragrant oil can be produced from the samuyao peel, and it has been used as a hair fragrance by women who live where it grows.

== Toxicity ==
The micrantha contains a significant amount of bergapten, a linear furanocoumarin well known for its phototoxic effects. Of 61 Citrus varieties tested, C. micrantha had the highest concentration of bergapten of any Citrus species. In particular, C. micrantha contained almost twice as much bergapten as the bergamot orange whose essential oil is highly phototoxic. Indiscriminate use of bergamot essential oil has led to several cases of phytophotodermatitis, a potentially severe skin inflammation. In these cases, the primary causal agent is believed to be bergapten.

== Hybrids ==
The Key lime (Citrus aurantifolia) is a hybrid of the micrantha and the citron. It, in turn, has been crossed with a lemon to produce the Persian lime (C. latifolia). There are lumias that are distinct micrantha/citron hybrids, such as the Pomme d'Adam, while other lumias, like the Borneo lemons, are micrantha/citron/pomelo tri-species hybrids. An Indonesian hybrid, the nansaran (C. × amblycarpa), is a C. hystrix/C. reticulata cross.
