= Kalpi (fruit) =

'Kalpi' (citrus)

Scientific classification
- Kingdom: Plantae
- Clade: Tracheophytes
- Clade: Angiosperms
- Clade: Eudicots
- Clade: Rosids
- Order: Sapindales
- Family: Rutaceae
- Genus: Citrus
- Species: C. × webberii

Binomial name
- Citrus × webberii Wester

Citrus fruit and plant

Kalpi (Citrus × webberii) is a natural citrus hybrid native to Philippines and is today one of the most common lemons in Hawaii, and is sometimes called 'Malayan lemon'.

== Description ==
The handsome tree is medium-sized, 5 to 10 metres (16 to 33 ft) tall. The acidic fruit is very juicy; they are used like lemons. Size is variable, depressed and globose, with 9 to 11 segments and very thin skin, yellowish when ripe.

== Taxonomy ==
'Kalpi' is a papeda. It looks somewhat like the common Philippine mandarin orange and the native Citrus macroptera.

It is named webberii after Herbert John Webber, by his disciple, abbreviation author Peter Jansen Wester. It has also been referred to incorrectly as webberi. The common name 'Kalpi' is from the Bicolano dialect.

It was published as Citrus webberii Wester in 1915 in Philipp. Agric. Rev. 1915, viii.

== Distribution ==
'Kalpi' grows in Luzon and Mindanao, in the Philippines.
