= Kalpi (disambiguation) =

Kalpi is a town in Uttar Pradesh, India.

Kalpi may also refer to:

- Kalpi (fruit), a natural citrus hybrid native to the Philippines
- Kalpi (Assembly constituency), a constituency of the Uttar Pradesh Legislative Assembly
- Kalpi, Ambala, an area of Ambala, Haryana, India

== See also ==
- Kalpis, a type of Greek pottery
