= Ponzu =

Japanese citrus-based condiment

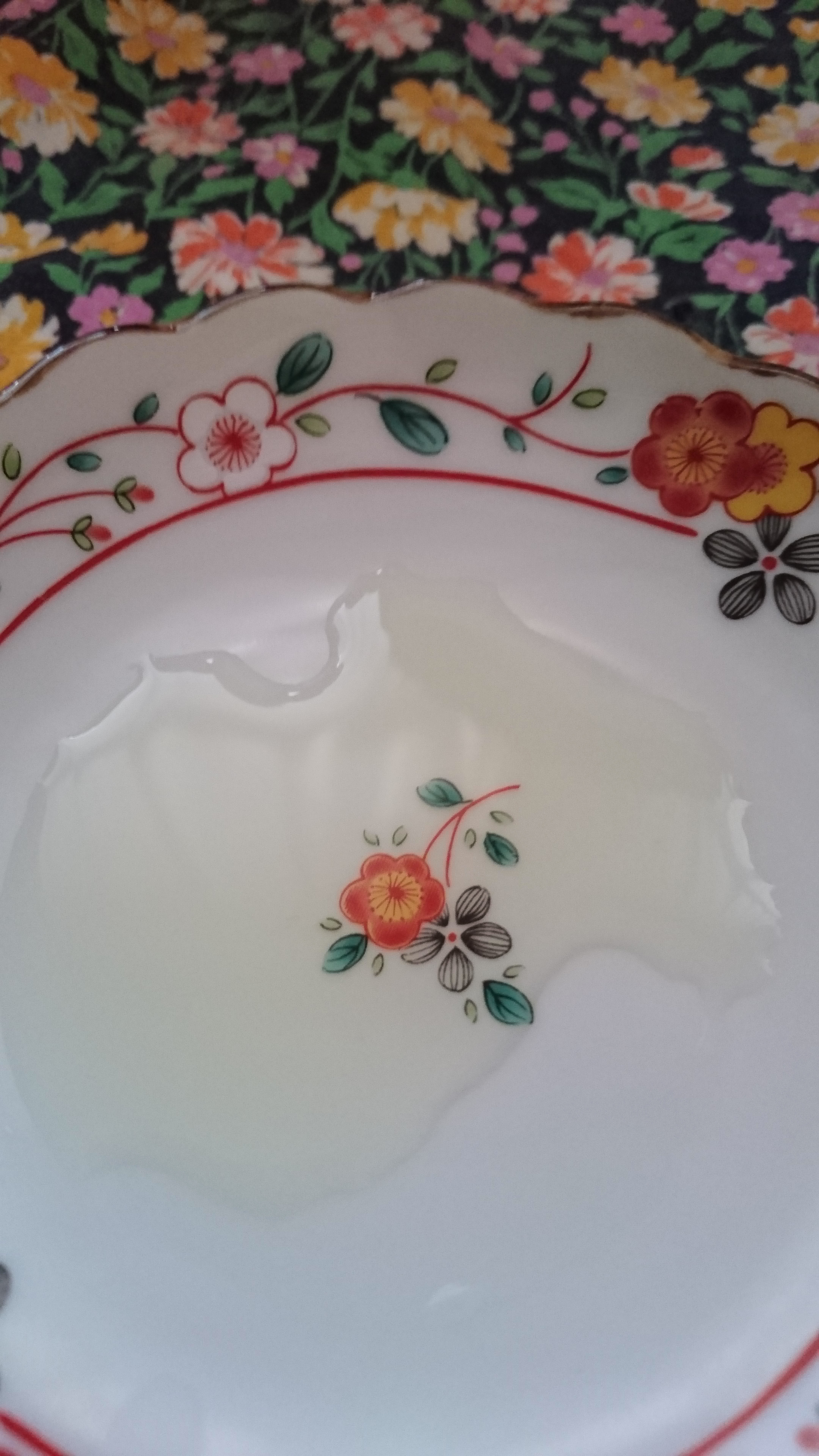
Mizkan ponzu

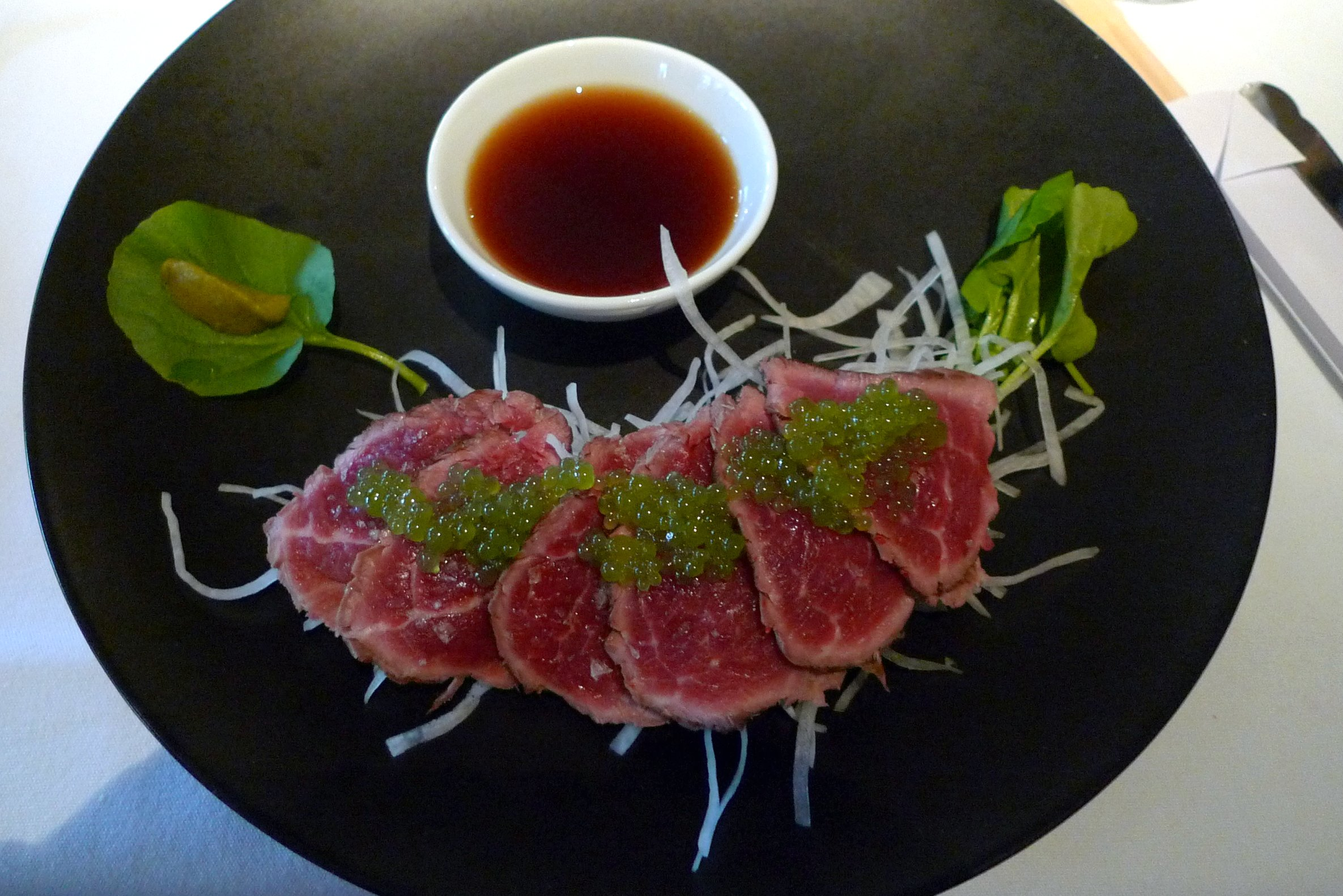
Ponzu shōyu and beef tataki

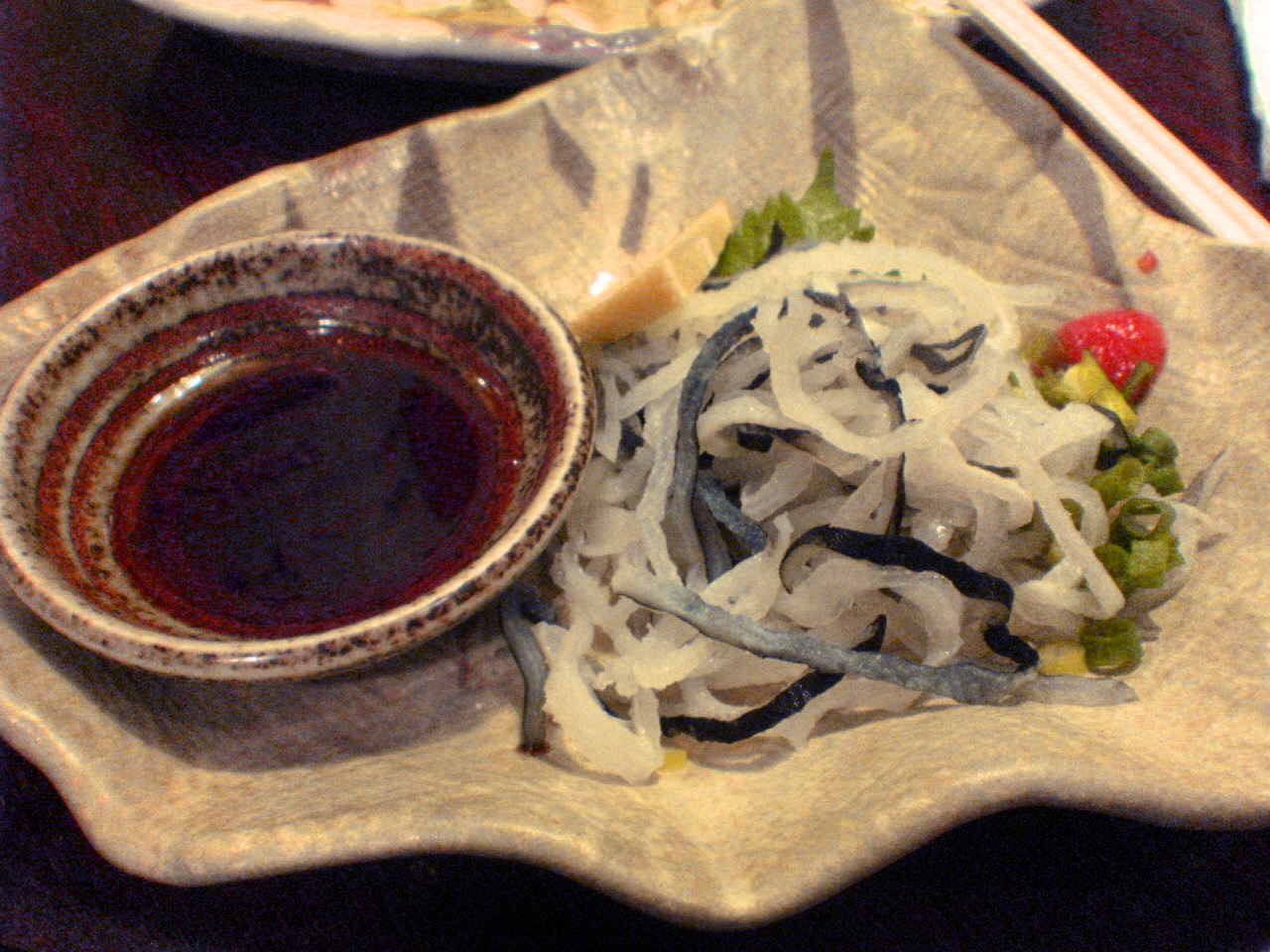
Ponzu shōyu (left) and fugu

Ponzu (ポン酢) (Japanese pronunciation: [pondzɯ]) is a citrus-based sauce commonly used in Japanese cuisine. It is tart, with a thin, watery consistency. Ponzu shōyu or ponzu jōyu (ポン酢醤油) is ponzu with soy sauce (shōyu) added, and the mixed dark brown product is widely referred to as simply ponzu.

The term originally came into the Japanese language as ponsu as a borrowing of the now obsolete Dutch word pons, meaning punch as in a beverage made from fruit juices. The sour nature of this sauce led to the final -su being interpreted as the word su (酢), meaning "vinegar".

Ponzu is made by simmering mirin, rice vinegar, katsuobushi flakes (from tuna), and seaweed (kombu) over medium heat. The liquid is then cooled, strained to remove the katsuobushi flakes, and finally the juice of one or more of the following citrus fruits is added: yuzu, sudachi, daidai, kabosu, or lemon (or even grapefruit, lime, bergamot, etc).

Commercial ponzu is generally sold in glass bottles, which may have some sediment. Ponzu shōyu is traditionally used as a dressing for tataki (lightly grilled, then chopped meat or fish) and also as a dip for nabemono (one-pot dishes) such as shabu-shabu. It is used as a dip for sashimi. In the Kansai region, it is offered as a topping for takoyaki.

== History and commercialization ==
Although citrus-based ponzu has a longer history, bottled ponzu became widely established as a household seasoning in Japan during the 20th century. In Kōchi Prefecture, yuzu ponzu developed into a commercial product around the 1960s, when declining forestry-related income encouraged local producers to find new uses for the region's abundant yuzu. Major manufacturers subsequently marketed ponzu shōyu for hot-pot dishes, helping expand its consumption beyond its regional origins. Today, ponzu is widely sold throughout Japan, while regional varieties continue to use different Japanese citrus fruits.

== See also ==
- Japanese words of Dutch origin
- List of condiments
- Toyomansi
- Media related to Ponzu at Wikimedia Commons
