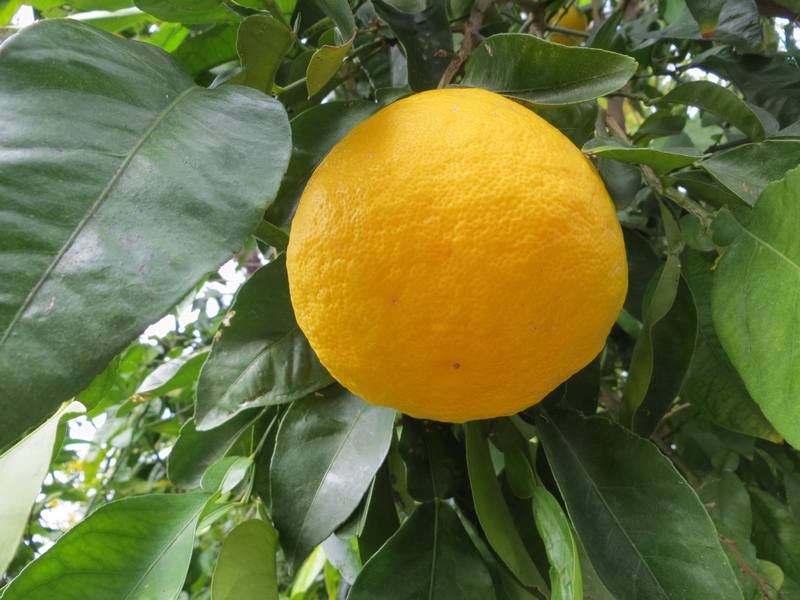

Scientific classification
- Kingdom: Plantae
- Clade: Tracheophytes
- Clade: Angiosperms
- Clade: Eudicots
- Clade: Rosids
- Order: Sapindales
- Family: Rutaceae
- Genus: Citrus
- Species: C. × wilsonii

Binomial name
- Citrus × wilsonii Yu.Tanaka

= Shangjuan =

Citrus fruit and plant

The shangjuan, or Ichang lemon (Citrus × wilsonii) is a cold-hardy citrus fruit and plant originating in East Asia. It is a hybrid between Citrus cavaleriei and Citrus maxima.
