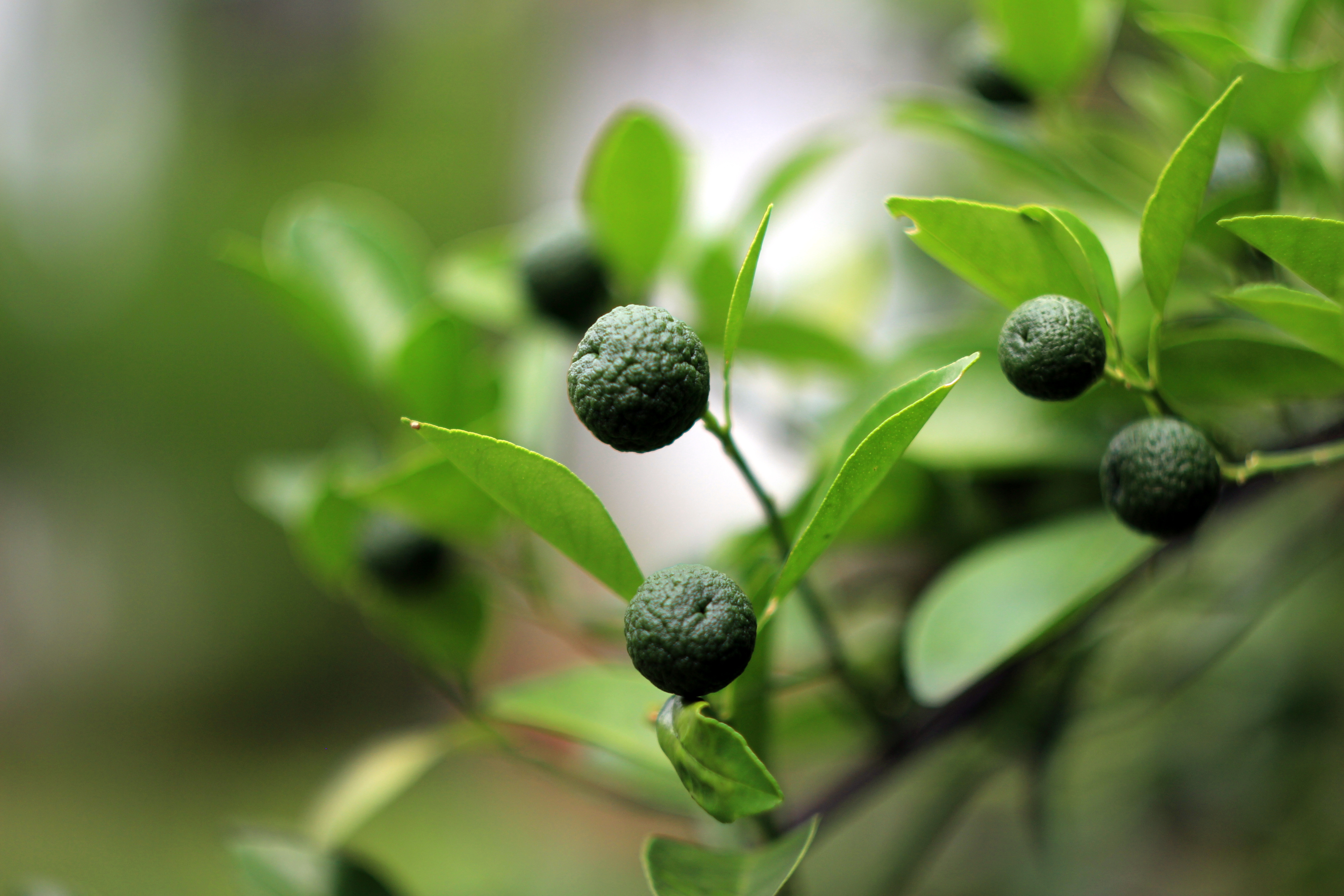

Scientific classification
- Kingdom: Plantae
- Clade: Embryophytes
- Clade: Tracheophytes
- Clade: Spermatophytes
- Clade: Angiosperms
- Clade: Eudicots
- Clade: Rosids
- Order: Sapindales
- Family: Rutaceae
- Genus: Citrus
- Species: C. × amblycarpa

Binomial name
- Citrus × amblycarpa (Hassk.) Ochse

Synonyms
- Citrus × limonellus var. amblycarpa Hassk.

= Citrus × amblycarpa =

Species of lime

Citrus × amblycarpa is an artificial hybrid species of citrus lime. It has the hybrid formula Citrus daoxianensis × Citrus hystrix.

== Common names ==
The species is referred to as nasnaran by some English speakers, and is called jeruk limau ("orange-lemon") in Indonesia.

== Characteristics ==
The species grows in hot, humid, tropical regions at altitudes up to 350 meters above sealevel. It can grow to between 3 and 7 meters in height. Amblycarpa leaves are dark green and oblong in shape. Its flowers are white and fragrant, and its fruits are green with a rough peel and juicy fresh, similar to other limes.

The fruits are widely popular as aromatic and flavor-enhancing fruits in Indonesia. The juice of half-ripened fruits is sour, and is used to flavor Indonesian condiments such as sambal olek, and added to dishes such as soto. A 2020 study suggested the peels of these fruits could have anti-diabetic effects, while a 2017 study found that the trees had good commercial potential as ornamental pot trees.
