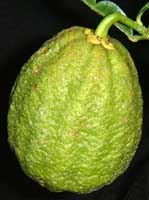

Scientific classification
- Kingdom: Plantae
- Clade: Tracheophytes
- Clade: Angiosperms
- Clade: Eudicots
- Clade: Rosids
- Order: Sapindales
- Family: Rutaceae
- Genus: Citrus
- Species: C. cavaleriei

Binomial name
- Citrus cavaleriei H.Lév. ex Cavalerie

Synonyms
- Citrus hongheensis Y.Ye, X.Liu, S.Q.Ding & M.Liang; Citrus ichangensis Swingle

= Citrus cavaleriei =

Species of fruit and plant

Citrus cavaleriei, the Ichang papeda (Chinese: 宜昌橙), is a slow-growing species of papeda that has characteristic lemon-scented foliage and flowers.

It is native to southwestern and west-central China and is likely named for the city of Yichang (宜昌), in China's Hubei province.

The Ichang papeda is notable for its unusual hardiness. With the exception of Poncirus trifoliata, it is the hardiest citrus plant, tolerating both moderate frost and damp conditions.

== Description ==
Relatively rare in cultivation, the Ichang papeda is a large shrub or small tree, growing to 3–4.5 m (9.8–14.8 ft), and produces a small, mandarin-like fruit. Leaves feature a broad petiole, and resemble the leaves of the yuzu and the kaffir lime in appearance. The fruit has a fragrant, but rugged rind, and may be oval, spherical, or flattened in shape, ripening to yellow or orange. It contains many large monoembryonic seeds and a small quantity of bitter or sour juice; some fruits lack juice entirely and are instead filled with a mass of pith and seeds.

The Ichang papeda is occasionally grown as an ornamental plant.

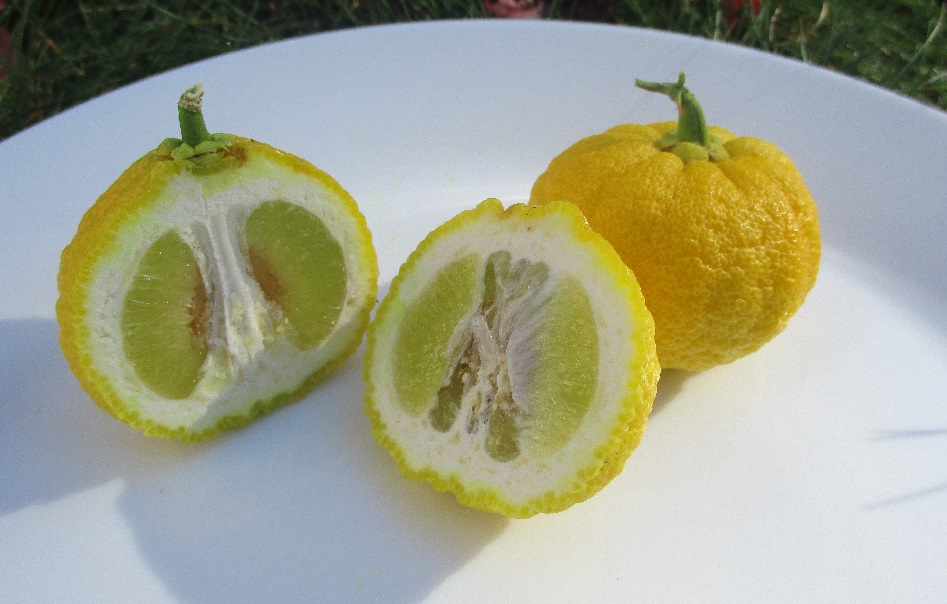
Ichang papeda fruits

== Hybrids ==
The Ichang papeda has been hybridised with many other citrus varieties, notably to produce hybrids that are relatively cold-hardy. Many of these hybrids also have many culinary applications:

- Kabosu - An Ichang papeda x Bitter orange cross.
- Shangjuan (also known as the Ichang lemon) - A cross between an Ichang papeda and a Pomelo.
- Yuzu - A naturally occurring hybrid between an Ichang papeda and a Mandarin orange.
  - Hyuganatsu - A Yuzu x Pomelo cross.
    - Haruka - A Hyuganatsu x Natsudaidai cross.
  - Jabara - Yuzu x Mandarin orange cross.
  - Sudachi - A cross between a Yuzu and a Koji/Tachibana orange.
