= Celebes papeda =

Scientific classification
- Kingdom: Plantae
- Clade: Tracheophytes
- Clade: Angiosperms
- Clade: Eudicots
- Clade: Rosids
- Order: Sapindales
- Family: Rutaceae
- Genus: Citrus
- Species: C. celebica

Binomial name
- Citrus celebica Koord

Species of citrus tree

Celebes papeda, is a citrus that grows in northeastern Celebes and the southern Philippines. Under some taxonomic systems it is named Citrus celebica, else is a regional variant of Citrus hystrix. It is a small tree with inedible fruit.
