= Sudachi =

Citrus fruit and plant

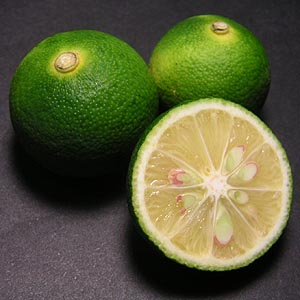
- Sudachi fruits
- Genus: Citrus
- Species: C. x sudachi

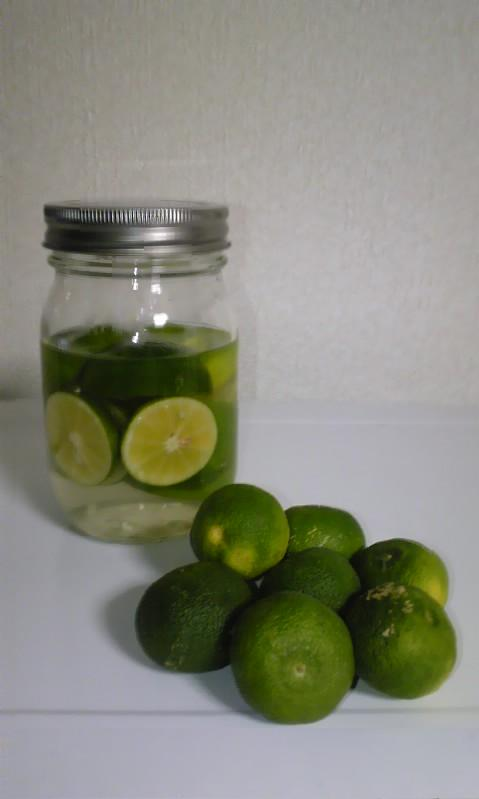
Sudachis in cuisine

Sudachi (Citrus x sudachi; Japanese: スダチ or 酢橘) is a small, round, green citrus fruit of Japanese origin that is a specialty of Tokushima Prefecture in Japan. Harvested before it fully ripens to yellow, it is tart and not eaten as a table fruit but used to flavor sauces and marinades, desserts, and drinks in place of lemon or lime. Genetic analysis shows it to be the product of a cross between a yuzu and another citrus fruit akin to the koji and tachibana orange.

== General ==
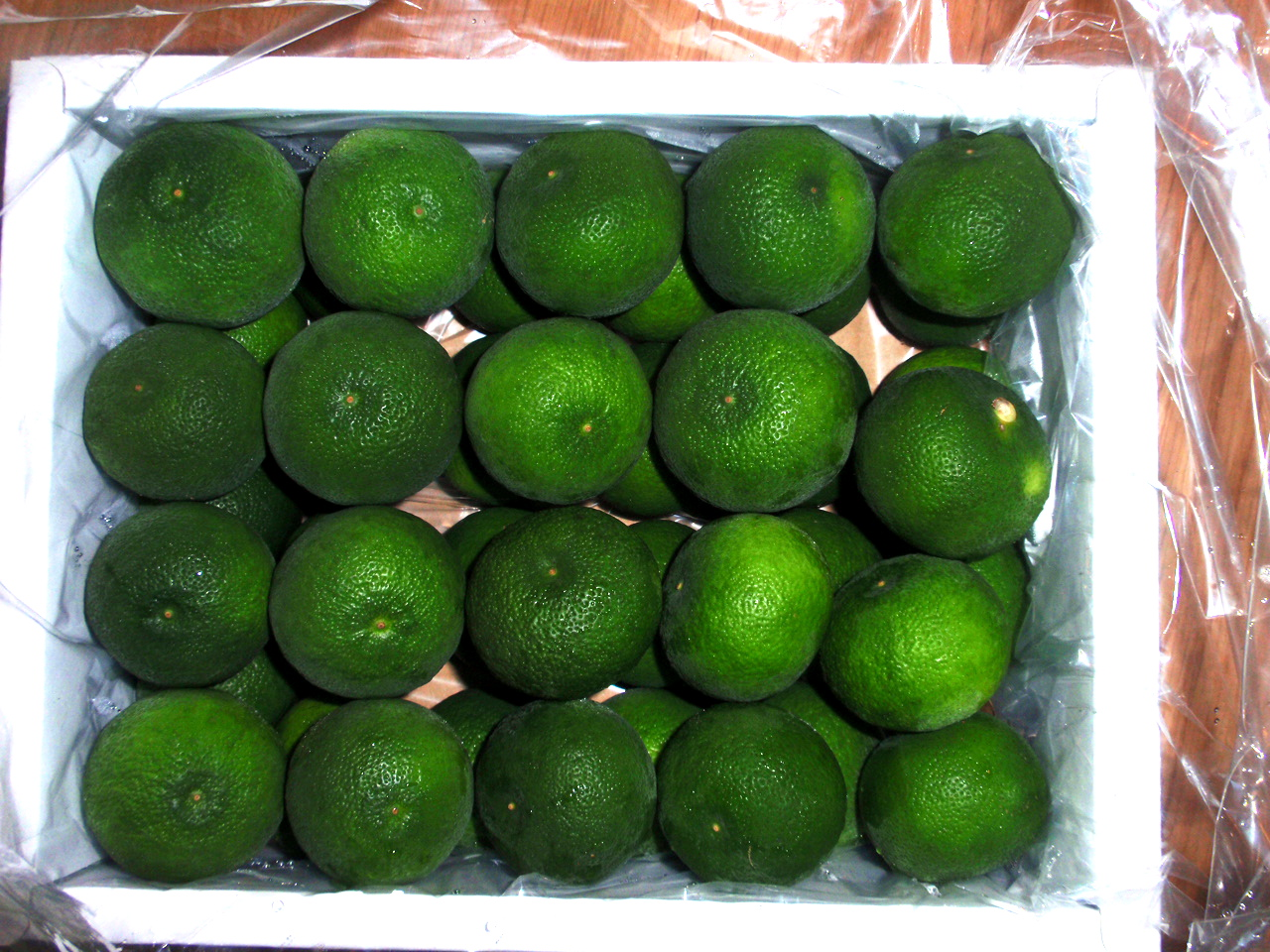
Sudachi

The sudachi has been cultivated for centuries in parts of Japan, and is perhaps nearly as well known as the yuzu in the country. The fruit is the specialty and symbol of the prefecture of Tokushima, which produces 98% of all the fruit grown in Japan. The top producing communities are the township of Kamiyama-cho and the village of Sanagouchi-son; combined, they accounted for almost half of the prefecture's annual production in 2008. The plant has white flowers which bloom in May and June. The fruits form in bunches and are harvested in the fall. Though sudachi fruits will eventually develop a yellow-orange rind color, they are normally harvested and used while still green. They contain large smooth seeds, containing a green polyembryo.

The Sudachi is sour and not consumed whole, but normally squeezed like a lemon or lime to flavor food. A half-slice of the fruit is served as garnish with many traditional Japanese dishes which include fish, soba, udon, nabe, and even some alcoholic beverages. It has also been considered an "indispensable companion" to eating matsutake mushrooms. Ponzu (ポン酢; "pon vinegar"), a citrus-based sauce used in Japanese cuisine, often includes sudachi along with other bitter oranges (kabosu or yuzu juices, and daidai) as an ingredient. Sudachi-flavored products (such as ice cream, vodka coolers, ice pops, and soft drinks) can also be found in Japan, particularly in Tokushima Prefecture, where the fruit is sold cheaply. In other parts of Japan, the fruit is considered a delicacy and is often expensive. Sudachi are considered to have a zestier flavor and aroma compared to lemons or limes, and have a higher calcium and ascorbic acid (vitamin C) content than lemons. Compared to the related kabosu, sudachi are much smaller at 20–25 g (0.71–0.88 oz) up to 40 g (1.4 oz) compared to 100–140 g (3.5–4.9 oz).

Some California farms now grow sudachi on a commercial scale, after trees became readily available to nurseries around 2008. The fruit is also being cultivated in Piura, Peru.

== Classification ==
Its species name was published by Mitsutaro Shirai (1933), but most modern scientists, even while still using this nomenclature by habit or as legacy, do not consider it as a bona fide species, but a cultivar or a hybrid of uncertain parentage. Tyozaburo Tanaka's assumption that the sudachi is a hybrid of yuzu appears to be supported by DNA studies; recent genetic analysis has confirmed its status as a hybrid, with one parent being the yuzu, and the other an unidentified relative of two native-Japanese cultivars, the koji and tachibana orange.

The sudachi was classed within the Papeda subgenus in the Swingle scheme, and in the more complicated Tyozaburo Tanaka scheme within the Eusmocitrus or true yuzu subgenus, under the Osmocitrus or yuzu section.

== Phytochemistry ==
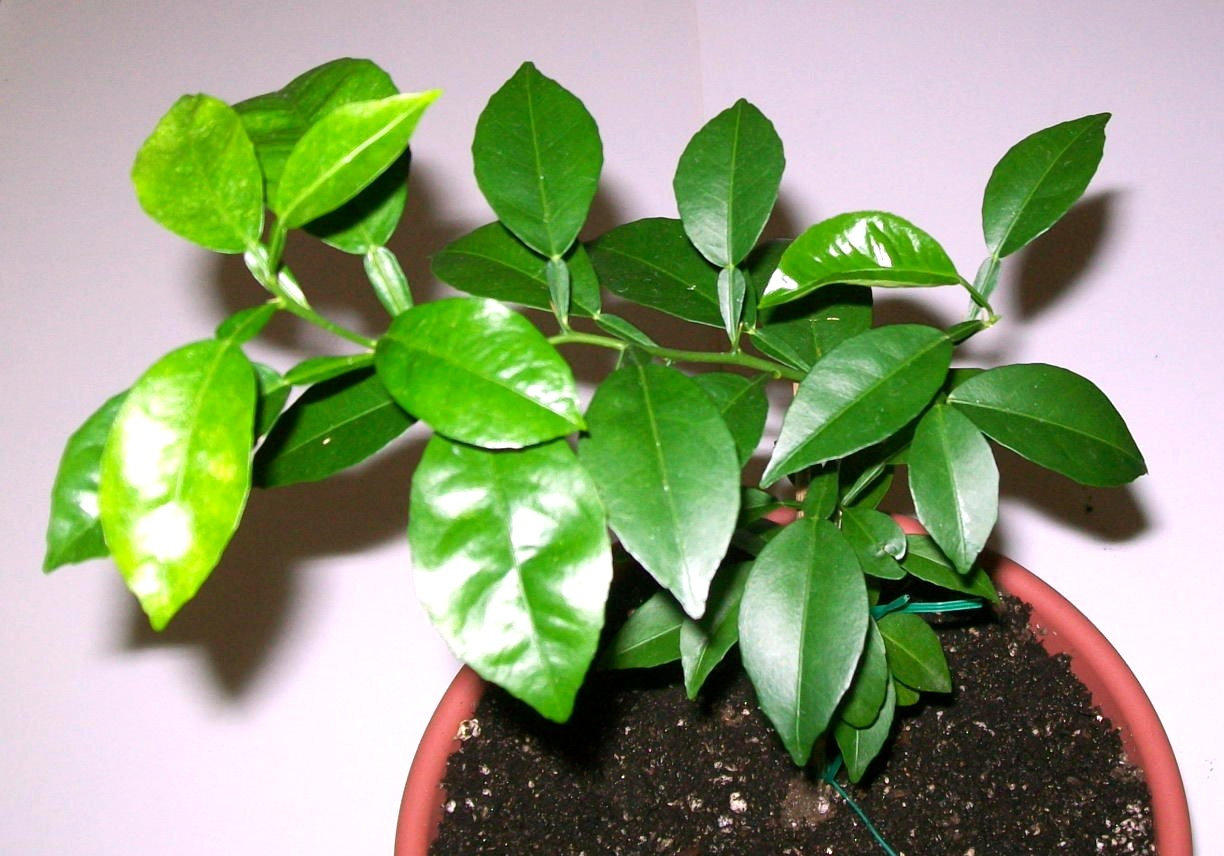
Sudachi seedling, one year old

The flavonoid eriocitrin abundant in lemon and lime juices is present in comparable concentrations in sudachi juice, but is lacking in yuzu or kabosu juices. Also, neoeriocitrin (characteristic in bergamot daidai) is found in sudachi juice and rind. Eriocitrin is an antioxidant reported to combat lipid peroxidation and like neoeriocitrin is said to block the formation of lipoxygenases involved in allergies and atherosclerosis.

Also, the flavonoid narirutin is said to be the active chemical in the Wakayama Prefecture specialty citrus jabara juice that is said to diminish the effects of pollen allergies. The jabara advertises that it contains 6 times the narirutin in yuzu, but sudachi juice also contains about 3 times as much as yuzu juice (20.1 mg per 100 ml, vs. 6.6 mg). This substance is quite abundant in the rind of yuzu and kabosu.

The ability of the sudachi to promote the body's calcium absorption has been studied as well.

In 2006, a Tokushima University research team published a report which suggests that the fruit may be effective in lowering glucose levels in diabetic patients. The team gave rats sudachi zest over a one-year period and found that their glucose levels were lowered, with signs of improved health in the rats.
