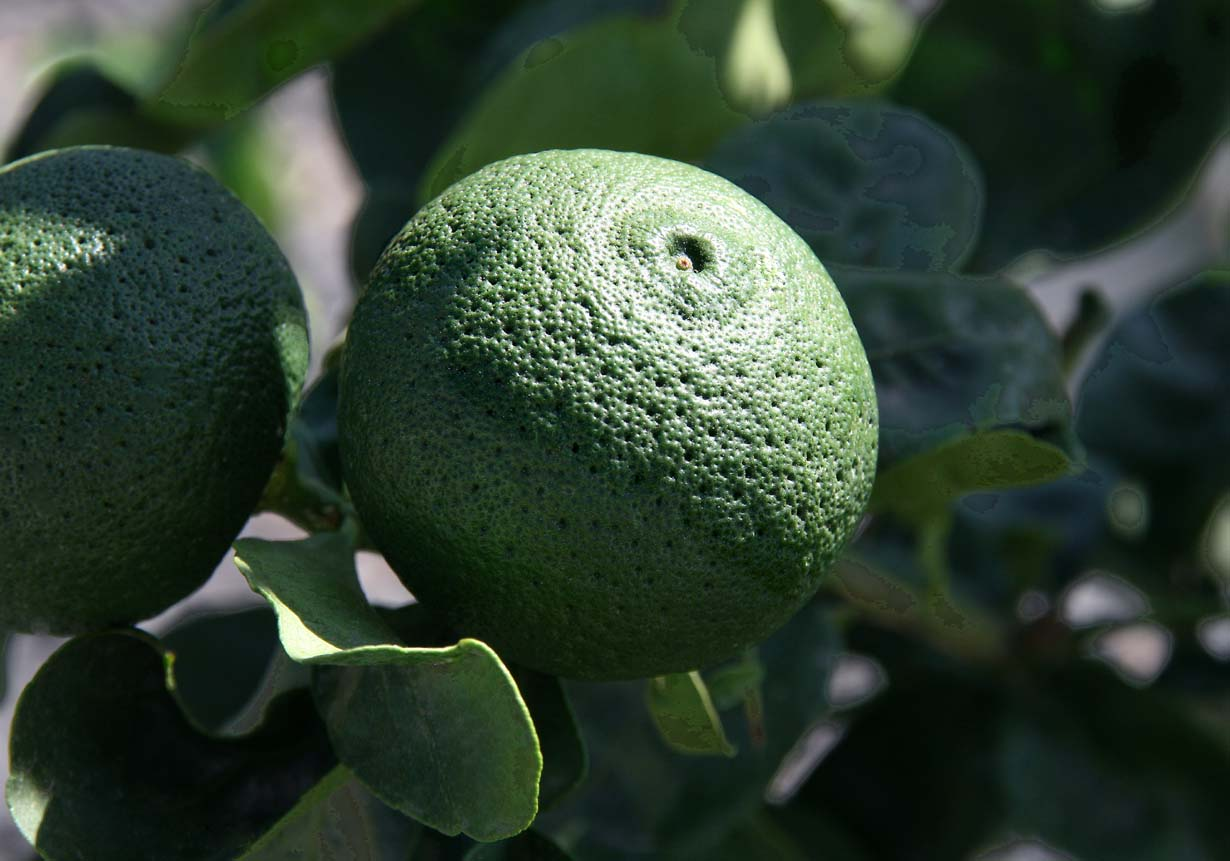

Scientific classification
- Kingdom: Plantae
- Clade: Tracheophytes
- Clade: Angiosperms
- Clade: Eudicots
- Clade: Rosids
- Order: Sapindales
- Family: Rutaceae
- Genus: Citrus
- Species: C. sphaerocarpa

Binomial name
- Citrus sphaerocarpa Tanaka, nom. nud.

= Kabosu =

Citrus fruit and plant

Kabosu (カボス or 臭橙; binomial name: Citrus sphaerocarpa) is a citrus fruit of an evergreen broad-leaf tree in the family Rutaceae. It is popular in Japan, especially Ōita Prefecture, where its juice is used to improve the taste of many dishes, especially cooked fish, sashimi, and hot pot dishes.

== Characteristics ==
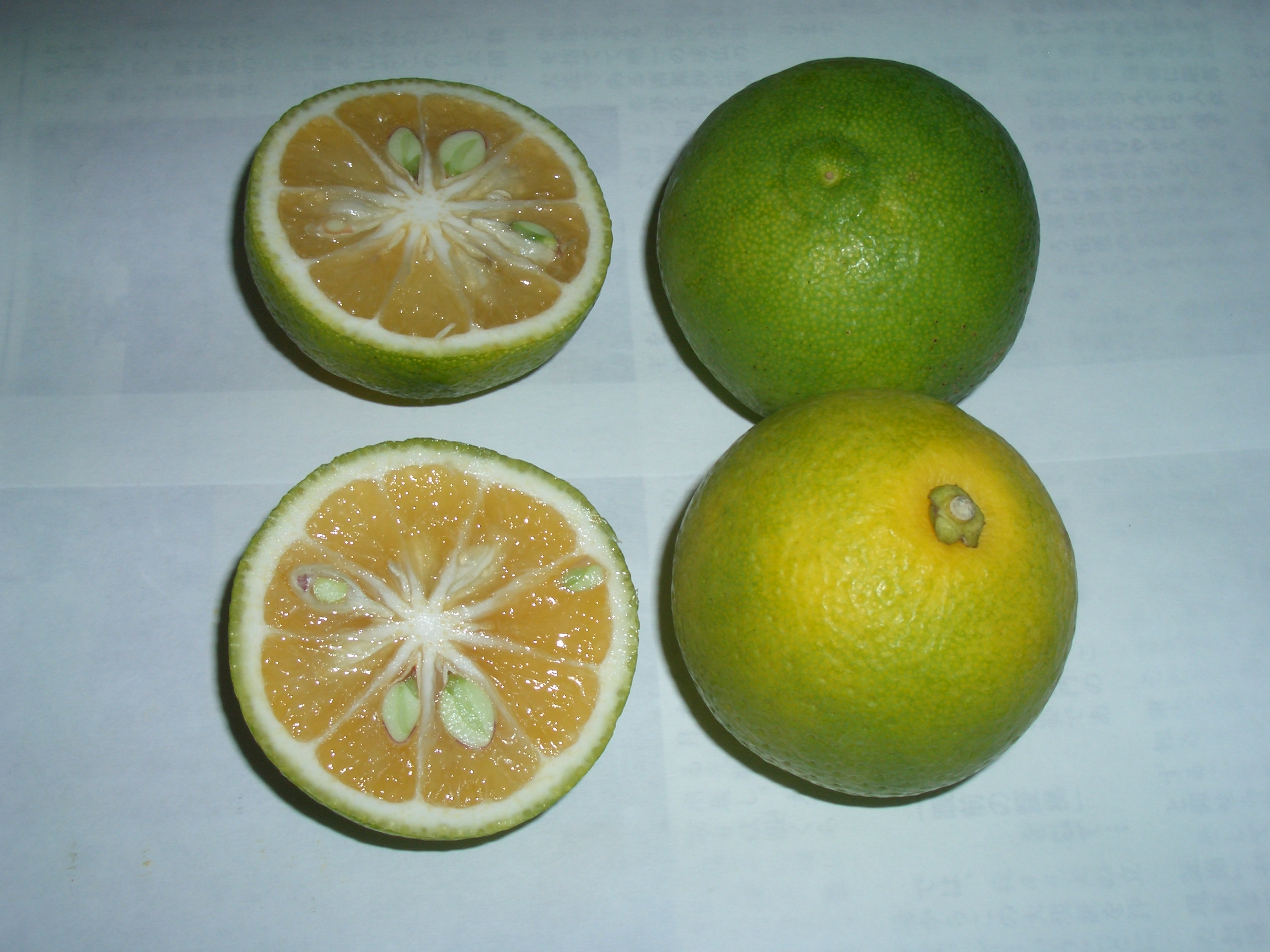
Cross-section of a kabosu, with two whole ones for comparison

Kabosu is a citrus fruit closely related to yuzu. Its juice has the sharpness of lemon, and it is used instead of vinegar in some Japanese dishes. It grows on a flowering tree with sharp thorns. The fruit is harvested when still green, but if left to ripen it turns yellow. It is often confused with similar citrus such as sudachi, but can easily be distinguished by the apex of the fruit where the pistil has fallen off, which is a slightly raised torus shape.

== Origin ==
Kabosu is thought to be an ichang papeda – bitter orange hybrid. It was not until the mid-Showa period that "kabosu" was first mentioned in literature. A legend from Usuki, Ōita says that a kabosu seed or sapling was brought to Ōita from Kyoto in the Edo period by a doctor named Sogen, beginning cultivation in the prefecture.

However, as there are kabosu trees that can be found in Ōita Prefecture that are older than those found anywhere else in Japan, kabosu are now thought to be native to the prefecture. In Usuki, there are many 200-year-old trees with some thought to be about 300 years old.

During the 1960s, cultivation of kabosu in Ōita increased and shipments of the fruit to other prefectures began. Production was promoted by the prefecture during the 1970s and sales and shipments continued to grow. This trend continued through the 1980s and 90s, making kabosu known nationwide as an Ōita meibutsu (local speciality).

== Usage ==
Kabosu juice is rich in sourness, with a unique fragrance. It is used with sashimi, grilled fish, ponzu for hot pot, and as a vinegar alternative for Japanese dishes. In Ōita Prefecture it is also used with miso soup, noodles, and shōchū, by adding the juice for flavoring. Squeezing vertically cut radial quarters with the peel side down prevents the seeds from entering the dish or cup while adding the juice. Kabosu juice is used in a wide range of products including condiments, juices, non-alcoholic beverages, frozen desserts, snack foods, wagashi, pastries, and alcoholic beverages.

When mixed in fish feed, the polyphenols in kabosu prevent discoloration and odor in fish meat for longer time periods. Japanese amberjack (buri) and Summer flounder (hirame) grown using this feed are marketed as Kabosu Buri and Kabosu Hirame in Ōita Prefecture.

== Production ==
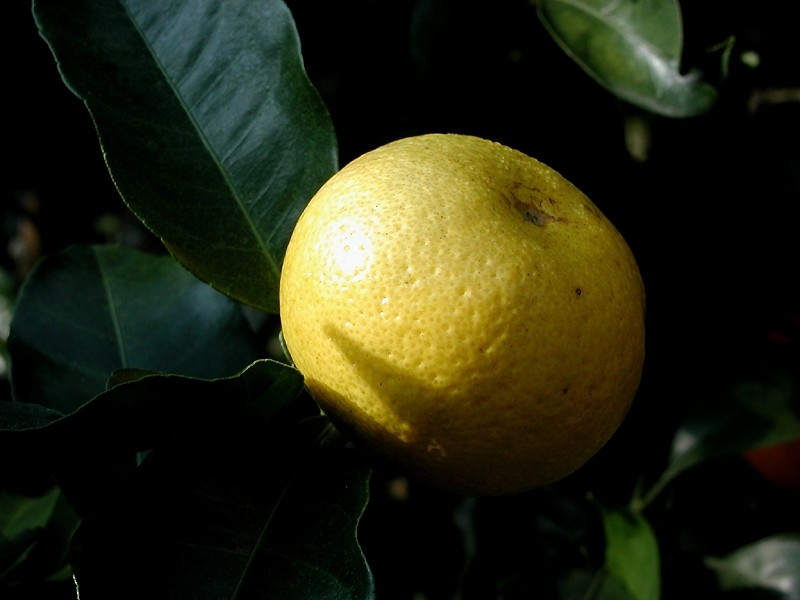
Kabosu on tree

In 2018, Ōita Prefecture accounted for about 99% of kabosu production in Japan. It is produced in most areas of the prefecture, particularly Usuki, Taketa, Bungo-Ōno, and Bungotakada. National Japanese production in 2007 was 5,185 tons. Prefecture-specific production volumes that year were 5,019 tons in Ōita Prefecture, 144 tons in Aichi Prefecture, and 17 tons in Miyazaki Prefecture, and volume in the main producing district of Ōita Prefecture was 97% of national production. There are good and bad years for Kabosu production; 2009 was a good year and the volume in Ōita Prefecture was about 6,587 tons. The annual production in Ōita Prefecture was 3,623 tons in 2010, and 5,273 tons in 2011.

Kabosu is in season from August to March, but stored kabosu or kabosu grown in greenhouses allow for the fruit to be available year-round.

== Character ==
A kabosu-motif mascot character called Kabotan was created for the National Greening Fair held in Ōita in 2003. The Ōita Kabosu promotion council chose this character as the mascot for "Ōita Kabosu" after the fair. In 2005, Kabotan's use was extended to regional development in general in Ōita Prefecture, even beyond Kabosu production.

== See also ==
- Yuukou
- Yuzu
- Jabara (citrus)
