= Peter Jansen Wester =

Swedish-American agricultural botanist (1877–1931)

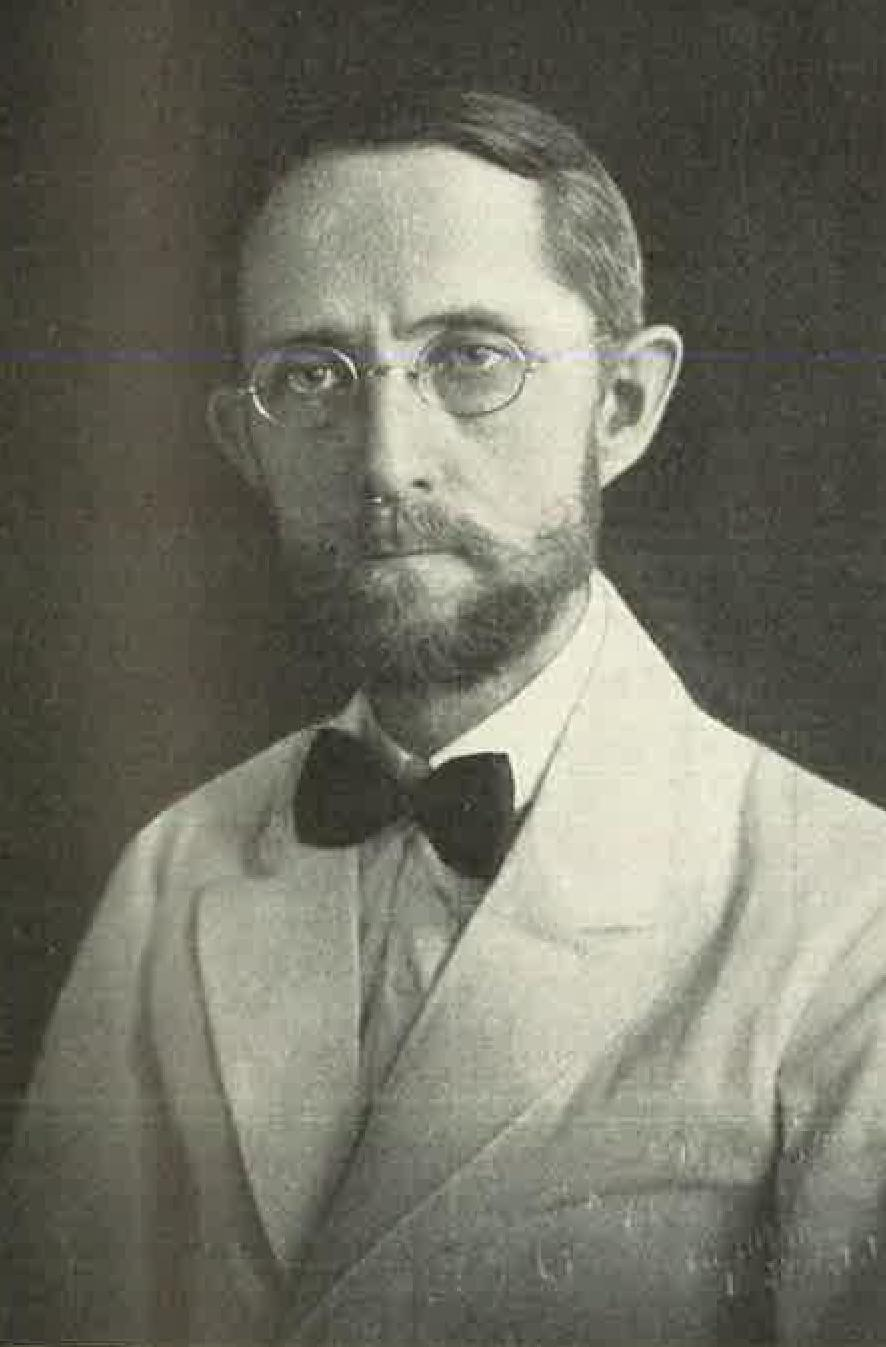
- Born: 23 September 1877; Arbrå
- Died: 18 August 1931; Manila
- Occupation: Botanist
- Employer: United States Department of Agriculture

Peter Jansen Wester (23 September 1877 – 1931; occasionally referred to himself as Peter Johnson Wester) was a Swedish-American agricultural botanist. Born in Sweden, he emigrated to the United States in 1897. Wester worked in several agricultural offices from 1897 to 1903, including leading the United States Department of Agriculture's experiment station and experimental plots for subtropical plants in Miami. He was a special agent in the USDA Bureau of Plant Industry in Miami and Washington from 1904 to 1910. He spent the remainder of his career in the Philippines, working with the Philippine Bureau of Agriculture from 1911 until his death. While there he was leader of Lanao Experimental Station and an advisor to the Minister. He made several trips to Singapore, Java, and Hawaii in order to study coffee cultivation and other crops for the purpose of introducing them to the Philippines.

Wester's field of interest were spermatophytes, particularly citruses.

== Early life ==
Peter Jansen was born in Arbrå, Hälsingland, in 1877. His early education was undertaken at home until he graduated from Gefleborgs Lans Folkhogskola in Bollnäs. He was involved in agricultural pursuits from a young age, and helped to breed and develop a better grade of wheat which his father and neighbors were growing by the time of his departure from Sweden. At the age of 20, Peter Jansen left Sweden for America, and upon entrance to the United States added the last name of Wester to his name. He spent his early career in the U.S. as a farm worker in New England and Florida and after six years was appointed, in 1904, to special agent of the Bureau of Plant Industry of the United States Department of Agriculture.

== Botanic research and the USDA ==
For the next four years, until 1908, Wester worked on field experiments in the Subtropical Garden experimental plots in Miami, Florida. At the end of his time there, he was placed in charge of the station. Then, in 1909 he was transferred to Washington in order to take charge of studying the culture of avocados and other tropical fruits. He spent a year in Washington before he returned to Florida for a year in 1910. Wester's time in the USDA was focused on studying and improving tropical agriculture for the United States – studying plants which could be profitable within the U.S. while also looking for improvements to the culture and propagation of plants already growing in the tropical regions of the country.

"He assembled the first and the largest avocado collection that hitherto had been made and has probably done more than any single man to improve and popularize the methods of asexual propagation of this fruit. The large anoma and guava collections now in the hands of the Department of Agriculture in Florida were largely due to his efforts. He was one of the first horticulturalists to recognize the coming importance of the roselle for culinary purposes and aroused general interest in the plant throughout the frostless regions in the United States. Early recognizing the need of knowledge of vegetative methods of propagation of the tropical fruits as being the first steps towards their amelioration, much of his time at the Subtropical Laboratory was engaged in experimental work of this character, and many valuable results where obtained. His most recent work along this line is the successful shield-budding of the cacao, which can best be appreciated when it is known that at present practically all cacao estates are planted with seedlings. This method of propagating the cacao may be profitably utilized on a large scale to replace the variable seedling and cumbersome inarching and patch-budding methods of the West Indies plantations and thus standardize the product."

== Time in the Philippines ==
In 1910, Wester was extended an offer to work in the Philippines and he joined the horticulture division of the Bureau of Agriculture 4 March 1911. He would continue to serve the Philippine government until his death, aside from a brief retirement from 1925 to 1927. He was in charge of the Lamao (Bataan) Experiment Station from 1911 to 1917. In June 1917 Wester transferred to the Department of Mindanao and Sulu as an agricultural advisor from 1917 to 1919. During this time, Wester focused extensively on natural resources and agricultural opportunities specific to the islands he was working on. Wester spent a majority of his time not only cataloging plants that were present but also seeking plants that he felt could flourish there. In fact, Wester tried to popularize the cereal grass Job's tears (Coix lacryma-jobi) with its Tagalog name, Adlai, without success. During this time, Wester wrote a popular bulletin, "Mindanao and Sulu Archipelago: Their Natural Resources and opportunities for Development." From 1919 until 1922 Wester returned to his original charge at the experiment station and then in 1922 he was designated horticulturalist and continued horticultural studies and explorations until his retirement in 1925. During his time in the Philippines, Wester studied various agricultural products – from Job's Tears and coffee to mangoes, avocados, and various varieties of apples and citruses.

From his retirement in 1925 until 1927 Wester returned to Florida for a time but once again returned to the Philippines in 1927 to take up his old position with the Bureau of Agriculture. Upon his return he was placed in charge of mangosteen, lychee, tea, and semi-temperate fruit projects and foreign and domestic seed and plant introduction, distribution, and exchange and assembling of data on Philippine food plants. His studies and experiments from this point were compiled into a bulletin titled "Food Plants of the Philippines".

Towards the end of his life, Wester assisted with the replanting and beautification of the Malacañang Palace garden and at his death was assisting with improving the grounds of the Wack Wack Club in Caloocan. After his return to the Philippines, Wester's services were requested by multiple institutions, including the United States Army. Wester had a fervent interest in tropical plants and undertook numerous experiments and endeavors in hopes of providing valuable crops to the people of the Philippines. He studied various agricultural products, such as mangos, avocados, oranges, apples, and more while writing in depth bulletins on his experiments and findings. Because of his devotion and constant travel and hunting for new varieties of plants, the Philippine Bureau of Plant Industry gained a large collection of tropical fruit from all over the world – including many citrus and avocado varieties. He wrote a bulletin, "Plant Propagation and Fruit Culture in the Tropics", and based on this research was able to introduce 86 more foreign plants to the Philippines by the end of his life. Throughout his life Wester was completely dedicated to his horticultural work and experiments while also maintaining his devotion to the people of the Philippines. During his career he wrote over 120 articles, bulletins, and circulars in regards to the work he was producing.

In August 1931, at the age of 54, Peter Jansen Wester died at Sternberg General Hospital in Manila.
