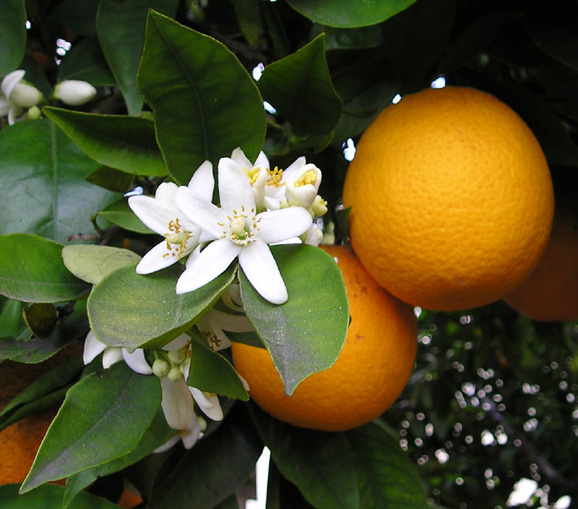
- Sweet orange (Citrus × sinensis cultivar)

Scientific classification
- Kingdom: Plantae
- Clade: Tracheophytes
- Clade: Angiosperms
- Clade: Eudicots
- Clade: Rosids
- Order: Sapindales
- Family: Rutaceae
- Subfamily: Aurantioideae
- Genus: Citrus; L.

Type species
- Citrus medica L.

Species and hybrids
- Ancestral species: Citrus maxima – Pomelo; Citrus medica – Citron; Citrus reticulata – Mandarin orange Citrus hystrix – Kaffir lime Citrus cavaleriei – Ichang papeda Citrus japonica – Kumquat Important hybrids: Citrus × aurantiifolia – Key lime Citrus × aurantium – Bitter orange Citrus × latifolia – Persian lime Citrus × limon – Lemon; Citrus × limonia – Rangpur; Citrus × paradisi – Grapefruit; Citrus × sinensis – Sweet orange Citrus × tangerina – Tangerine; See also List of citrus fruits.

Synonyms
- Aurantium Mill.; Citreum Mill.; ×Citrofortunella J.W.Ingram & H.E.Moore; ×Citroncirus J.W.Ingram & H.E.Moore; Citrophorum Neck.; Eremocitrus Swingle; Feroniella Swingle; Fortunella Swingle; Limon Mill.; Microcitrus Swingle; Oxanthera Montrouz.; Papeda Hassk.; Pleurocitrus Tanaka; Poncirus Raf.; Pseudaegle Miq.; Sarcodactilis C.F.Gaertn.

= Citrus =

Citrus Temporal range: Tortonian–Present, 8–0 Ma

Genus of flowering plants

Citrus is a genus of flowering trees and shrubs in the family Rutaceae. Plants in the genus produce citrus fruits, such as citrons, mandarins, and pomelos. Many important citrus crops have been developed through extensive hybridization, including oranges, lemons, grapefruits, and limes, all of which have many cultivars.

Citrus is native to South Asia, East Asia, Southeast Asia, Melanesia, and Australia. Indigenous people in these areas have used and domesticated various species since ancient times. Its cultivation first spread into Micronesia and Polynesia through the Austronesian expansion (c. 3000–1500 BCE). Later, it was spread to the Middle East and the Mediterranean (c. 1200 BCE) via the incense trade route, and then from Europe to the Americas.

Renowned for their highly fragrant aromas and complex flavor, citrus are among the most popular fruits in cultivation. With a propensity to hybridize between species, making their taxonomy complicated, the genus has numerous varieties encompassing a wide range of appearance and fruit flavors.

== Evolution ==
=== Evolutionary history ===
The large citrus fruit of today evolved originally from small, edible berries over millions of years. Citrus species began to diverge from a common ancestor about 15 million years ago, at about the same time that Severinia (such as the Chinese box orange) diverged from the same ancestor. About 7 million years ago, the ancestors of Citrus split into the main genus, Citrus, and the Poncirus group (such as the trifoliate orange), which some taxonomies consider a separate genus and others include in Citrus. Poncirus is closely enough related that it can still be hybridized with all other citrus and used as rootstock. These estimates are made using genetic mapping of plant chloroplasts. A DNA study published in Nature in 2018 concludes that the genus Citrus evolved in the foothills of the Himalayas, in the area of Assam (India), western Yunnan (China), and northern Myanmar.

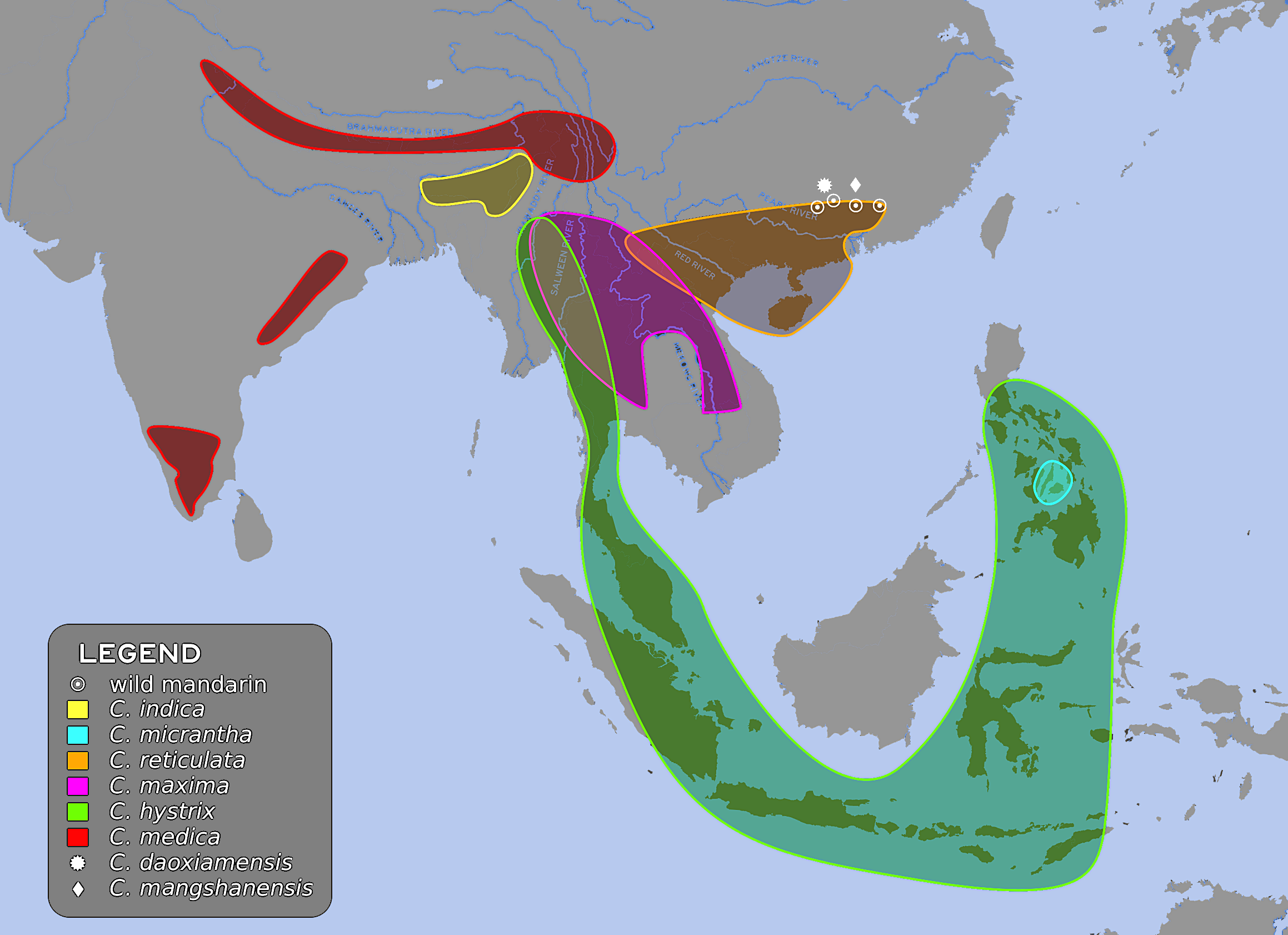
Map of inferred original wild ranges of the main Citrus cultivars, and selected relevant wild taxa

The three ancestral species in the genus Citrus associated with modern Citrus cultivars are the mandarin orange, pomelo, and citron. Almost all of the common commercially important citrus fruits (sweet oranges, lemons, grapefruit, limes, and so on) are hybrids between these three species, their main progenies, and other wild Citrus species within the last few thousand years.

Citrus plants are native to subtropical and tropical regions of Asia, Island Southeast Asia, Near Oceania, and northeastern and central Australia. Domestication of citrus species involved much hybridization and introgression, leaving much uncertainty about when and where domestication first happened. A genomic, phylogenic, and biogeographical analysis by Wu et al. (2018) has shown that the center of origin of the genus Citrus is likely the southeast foothills of the Himalayas, in a region stretching from eastern Assam, northern Myanmar, to western Yunnan. It diverged from a common ancestor with Poncirus trifoliata. A change in climate conditions during the Late Miocene (11.63 to 5.33 mya) resulted in a sudden speciation event. The species resulting from this event include the citrons (Citrus medica) of South Asia; the pomelos (C. maxima) of Mainland Southeast Asia; the mandarins (C. reticulata), kumquats (C. japonica), mangshanyegan (C. mangshanensis), and ichang papedas (C. cavaleriei) of southeastern China; the kaffir limes (C. hystrix) of Island Southeast Asia; and the biasong and samuyao (C. micrantha) of the Philippines.

This was followed by the spread of citrus species into Taiwan and Japan in the Early Pliocene (5.33 to 3.6 mya), resulting in the tachibana orange (C. tachibana); and beyond the Wallace Line into Papua New Guinea and Australia during the Early Pleistocene (2.5 million to 800,000 years ago), where further speciation events created the Australian limes.

=== Fossil record ===
A fossil leaf from the Pliocene of Valdarno, Italy is described as †Citrus meletensis. In China, fossil leaf specimens of †Citrus linczangensis have been collected from late Miocene coal-bearing strata of the Bangmai Formation in Yunnan province. C. linczangensis resembles C. meletensis in having an intramarginal vein, an entire margin, and an articulated and distinctly winged petiole.

=== Taxonomy ===
Many cultivated Citrus species are natural or artificial hybrids of a small number of core ancestral species, including the citron, pomelo, and mandarin. Natural and cultivated citrus hybrids include commercially important fruit such as oranges, grapefruit, lemons, limes, and some tangerines. The multiple hybridisations have made the taxonomy of Citrus complex.

Many Citrus species are hybrids of citron, mandarin and pomelo.

Kumquats and Clymenia spp. are now generally considered to belong within the genus Citrus. The false oranges, Oxanthera from New Caledonia, have been transferred to the Citrus genus on phylogenetic evidence. A recent taxonomy reincorporates the trifoliate orange (Poncirus) into an enlarged Citrus, but recognizes that many botanists still follow Walter Tennyson Swingle in splitting it off.

=== Genomics ===
In 2026, the first haplotype-resolved telomere-to-telomere genome assembly of Citrus maxima was published. The study also introduced the HapGene annotation pipeline and generated improved haplotype-aware annotations for the genomes of Citrus maxima, Citrus × sinensis, and Citrus reticulata. In the same year, a haplotype-resolved genome assembly was published for the Citrus × sinensis cultivar 'Pera IAC', the most widely cultivated sweet orange cultivar in Brazil. Together, these studies expanded the genomic resources available for citrus species by providing high-quality reference genome assemblies and improved gene annotations for several economically important members of Citrus.

== History ==
The earliest introductions of citrus species by human migrations was during the Austronesian expansion (c. 3000–1500 BCE), where Citrus hystrix, Citrus macroptera, and Citrus maxima were among the canoe plants carried by Austronesian voyagers eastwards into Micronesia and Polynesia.

The citron (Citrus medica) was also introduced early into the Mediterranean basin from India and Southeast Asia, via two ancient trade routes: an overland route through Persia, the Levant, and the Mediterranean islands, and a maritime route through the Arabian Peninsula and Ptolemaic Egypt into North Africa. Although the exact date of the original introduction is unknown due to the sparseness of archaeobotanical remains, the earliest evidence is seeds recovered from the Hala Sultan Tekke site of Cyprus, dated to around 1200 BCE. Other archaeobotanical evidence includes pollen from Carthage, dating back to the 4th century BCE, and carbonized seeds from Pompeii dated to around the 3rd to 2nd century BCE. The earliest complete description of the citron was written by Theophrastus, c. 310 BCE.

Lemons, pomelos, and sour oranges were introduced to the Mediterranean by Arab traders around the 10th century CE. Sweet oranges were brought to Europe by the Genoese and Portuguese from Asia during the 15th to 16th century. Mandarins were not introduced until the 19th century. Oranges were introduced to Florida by Spanish colonists. In cooler parts of Europe, citrus fruit was grown in orangeries starting in the 17th century; many were as much status symbols as functional agricultural structures.

== Etymology ==
The generic name Citrus originates from Latin, where it denoted either the citron (C. medica) or a conifer tree. The Latin word is related to the ancient Greek word for the cedar of Lebanon, κέδρος (kédros), perhaps from a perceived similarity of the smell of citrus leaves and fruit with that of cedar.

== Description ==
=== Tree ===
Citrus plants are large shrubs or small to moderate-sized trees, reaching 5–15 m (16–49 ft) tall, with spiny shoots and alternately arranged evergreen leaves with an entire margin. The flowers are solitary or in small corymbs, each flower 2–4 cm (0.79–1.57 in) diameter, with five (rarely four) white petals and numerous stamens; they are often very strongly scented, due to the presence of essential oil glands.

=== Fruit ===
Structure of the botanical hesperidium

The fruit is a hesperidium, a specialised berry with multiple carpels, globose to elongated, 4–30 cm (1.6–11.8 in) long and 4–20 cm (1.6–7.9 in) diameter, with a leathery rind or "peel" called a pericarp. The outermost layer of the pericarp is an "exocarp" called the flavedo, commonly referred to as the zest. The middle layer of the pericarp is the mesocarp, which in citrus fruits consists of the white, spongy albedo or pith. The innermost layer of the pericarp is the endocarp. This surrounds a variable number of carpels, shaped as radial segments. The seeds, if present, develop inside the carpels. The space inside each segment is a locule filled with juice vesicles, or pulp. From the endocarp, string-like "hairs" extend into the locules, which provide nourishment to the fruit as it develops. The genus is commercially important with cultivars of many species grown for their fruit. Some cultivars have been developed to be easy to peel and seedless, meaning they are parthenocarpic.

The fragrance of citrus fruits is conferred by essential oils including flavonoids and limonoids in the rind. The flavonoids comprise various flavanones and flavones. The carpels are juicy; they contain a high quantity of citric acid, which with other organic acids including ascorbic acid (vitamin C) give them their characteristic sharp taste. Citrus fruits are diverse in size and shape, as well as in color and flavor, reflecting their biochemistry; for instance, grapefruit is made bitter-tasting by a flavanone, naringin.

Essential oils in the rind of major citrus fruits
Fruit	Limonene content	Other distinctive oils
Orange	~90–95%	β-myrcene
Grapefruit	~90–96%	Nootkatone (trace, 1-p-menthene-8-thiol
Mandarin	~70–75%	γ-terpinene, 1,8-cineole
Lemon	~60–70%	β-pinene, γ-terpinene
Lime	~37–46%	β-pinene, γ-terpinene
Bergamot	~30–45%	Linalool, linalyl acetate

Citrus fruits are diverse in size, shape, color, and flavor.

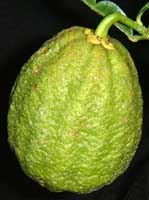
Ichang papeda

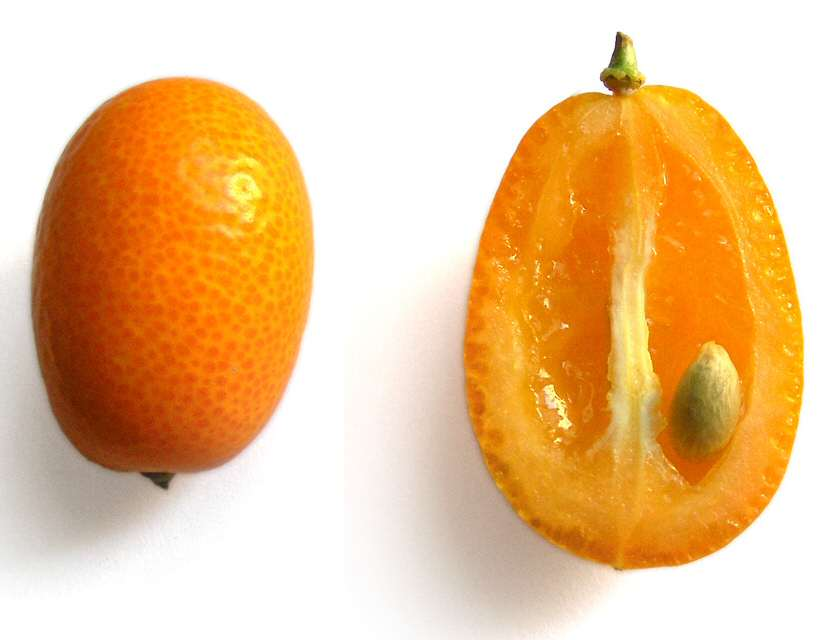
Kumquat, with a seed inside one of the carpels

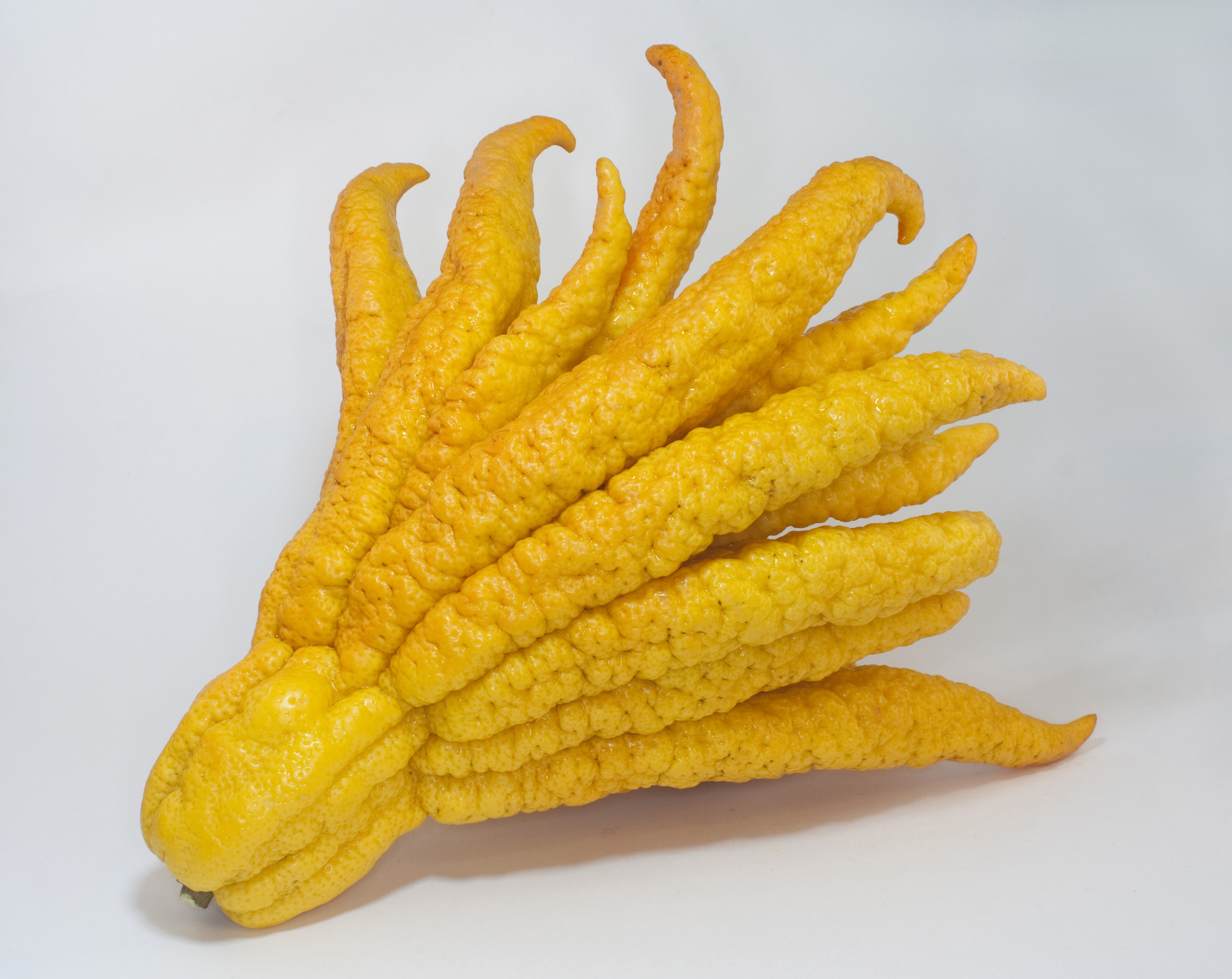
Buddha's hand

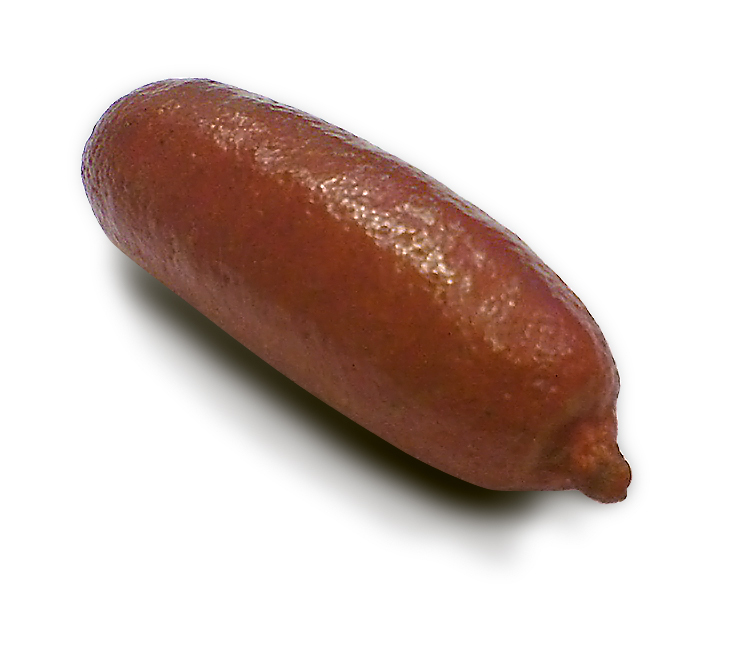
Red finger lime

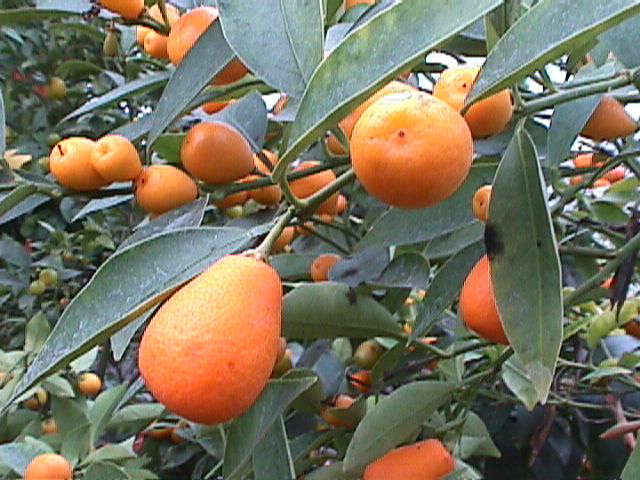
Clymenia

== Cultivation ==
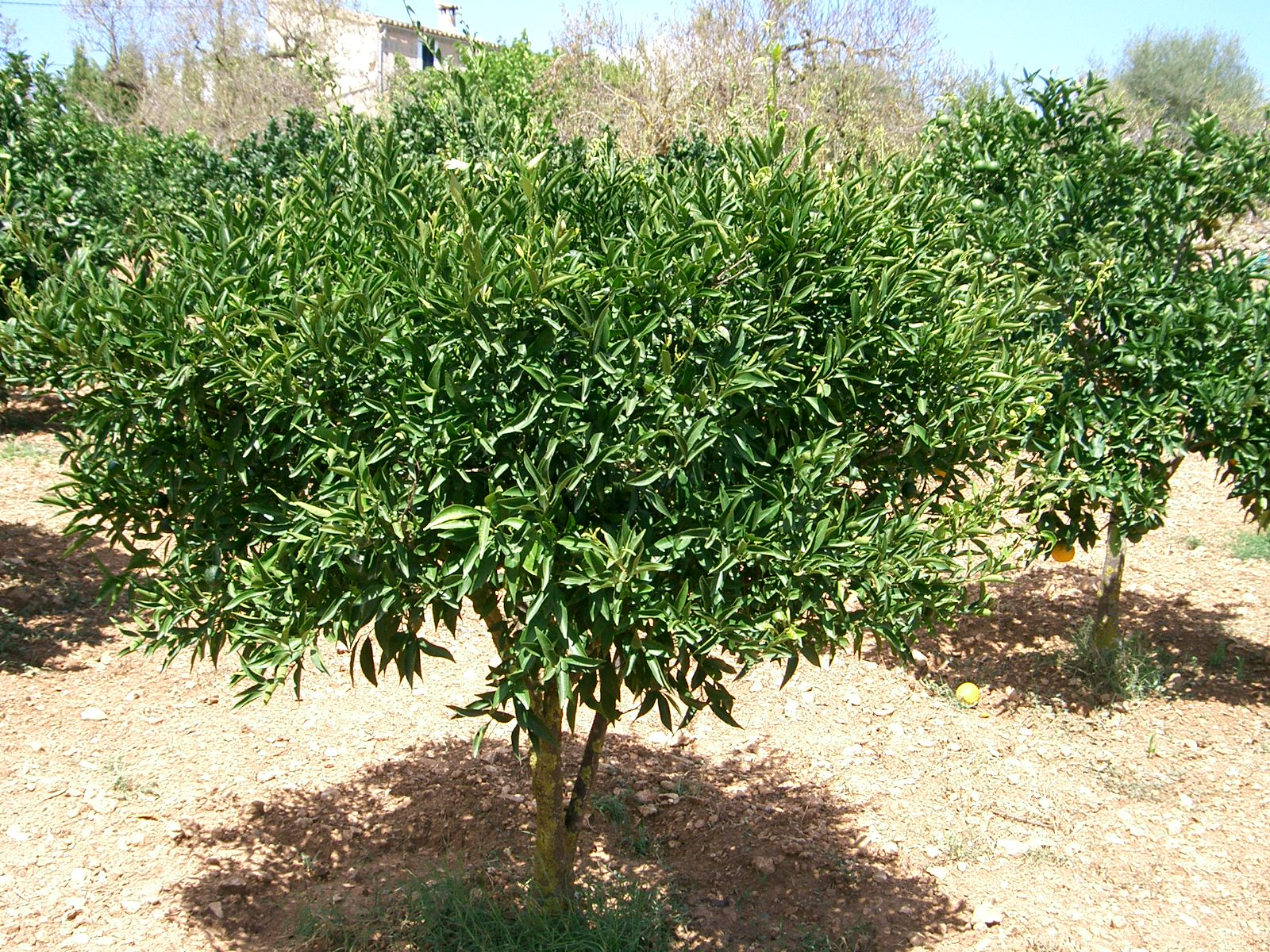
Mediterranean Mandarin (Citrus × deliciosa) plantation, Mallorca

Most commercial citrus cultivation uses trees produced by grafting the desired fruiting cultivars onto rootstocks selected for disease resistance and hardiness. The trees are not generally frost hardy. They thrive in a consistently sunny, humid environment with fertile soil and adequate water.

The color of citrus fruits only develops in climates with a (diurnal) cool winter. In tropical regions with no winter at all, citrus fruits remain green until maturity, hence the tropical "green oranges". The terms 'ripe' and 'mature' are widely used synonymously, but they mean different things. A mature fruit is one that has completed its growth phase. Ripening is the sequence of changes within the fruit from maturity to the beginning of decay. These changes involve the conversion of starches to sugars, a decrease in acids, softening, and a change in the fruit's color. Citrus fruits are non-climacteric and respiration slowly declines and the production and release of ethylene is gradual.

=== Production ===
Major producing regions

According to the UN Food and Agriculture Organization, world production of all citrus fruits in 2016 was 124 million tonnes, with about half of this production as oranges. At US $15.2 billion equivalent in 2018, citrus trade makes up nearly half of the world fruit trade, which was US$32.1 billion that year. According to the United Nations Conference on Trade and Development, citrus production grew during the early 21st century mainly by the increase in cultivation areas, improvements in transportation and packaging, rising incomes and consumer preference for healthy foods. In 2019–20, world production of oranges was estimated to be 47.5 million tonnes, led by Brazil, Mexico, the European Union, and China as the largest producers.

Production of citrus fruit

Citrus fruit yield

=== Pests and diseases ===
Among the diseases of citrus plantations are citrus black spot (a fungus), citrus canker (a bacterium), citrus greening (a bacterium, spread by an insect pest), and sweet orange scab (a fungus, Elsinöe australis). Citrus plants are liable to infestation by ectoparasites which act as vectors to plant diseases: for example, aphids transmit the damaging citrus tristeza virus, while the aphid-like Asian citrus psyllid can carry the bacterium which causes the serious citrus greening disease. This threatens production in Florida, California, and worldwide. Citrus groves are attacked by parasitic Nematodes including citrus (Tylenchulus semipenetrans) and sheath nematodes (Hemicycliophora spp.).

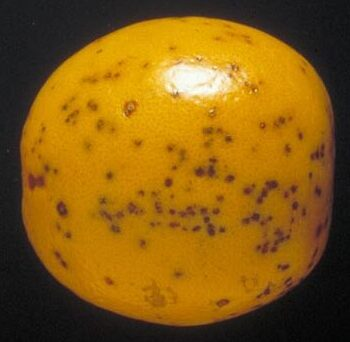
Citrus black spot on a Valencia orange

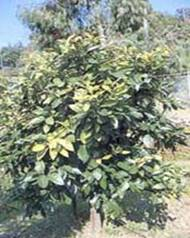
Chlorosis caused by Citrus tristeza virus

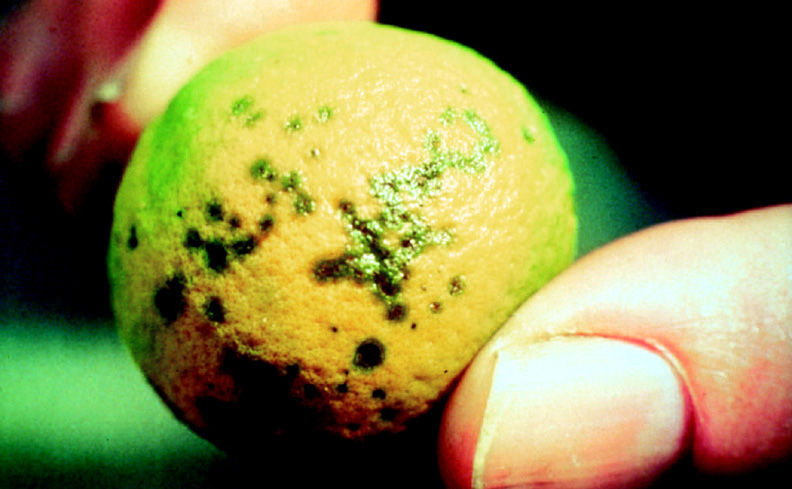
Citrus canker, caused by the gammaproteobacterium Xanthomonas axonopodis

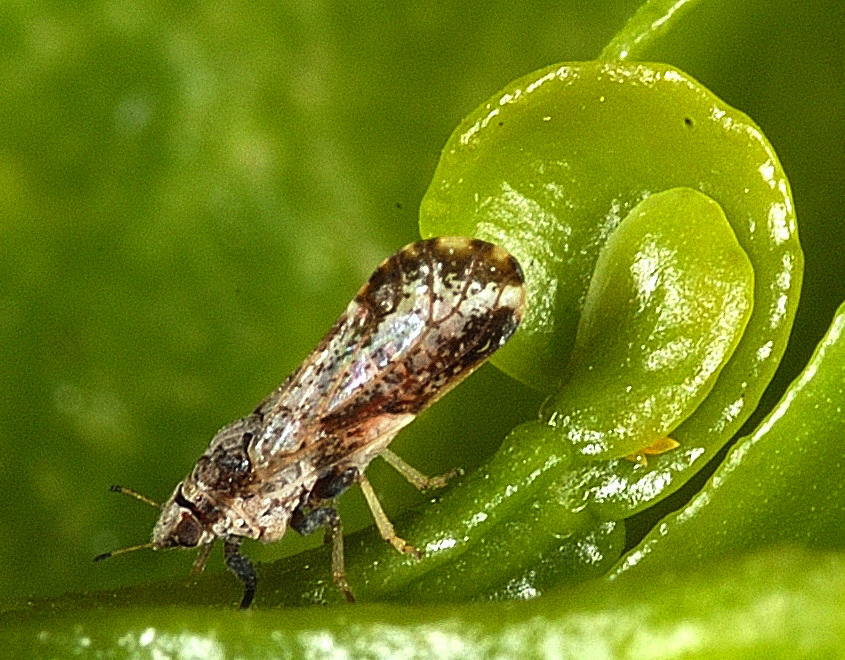
Asian citrus psyllid, vector of citrus greening disease

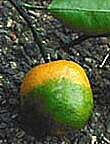
Citrus greening disease on mandarin orange

Life stages of the citrus nematode,Tylenchulus semipenetrans

=== Deficiency diseases ===
Citrus plants can develop the deficiency condition chlorosis, characterized by yellowing leaves. The condition is often caused by an excessively high pH (alkaline soil), which prevents the plant from absorbing nutrients such as iron, magnesium, and zinc needed to produce chlorophyll.

== Effects on humans ==
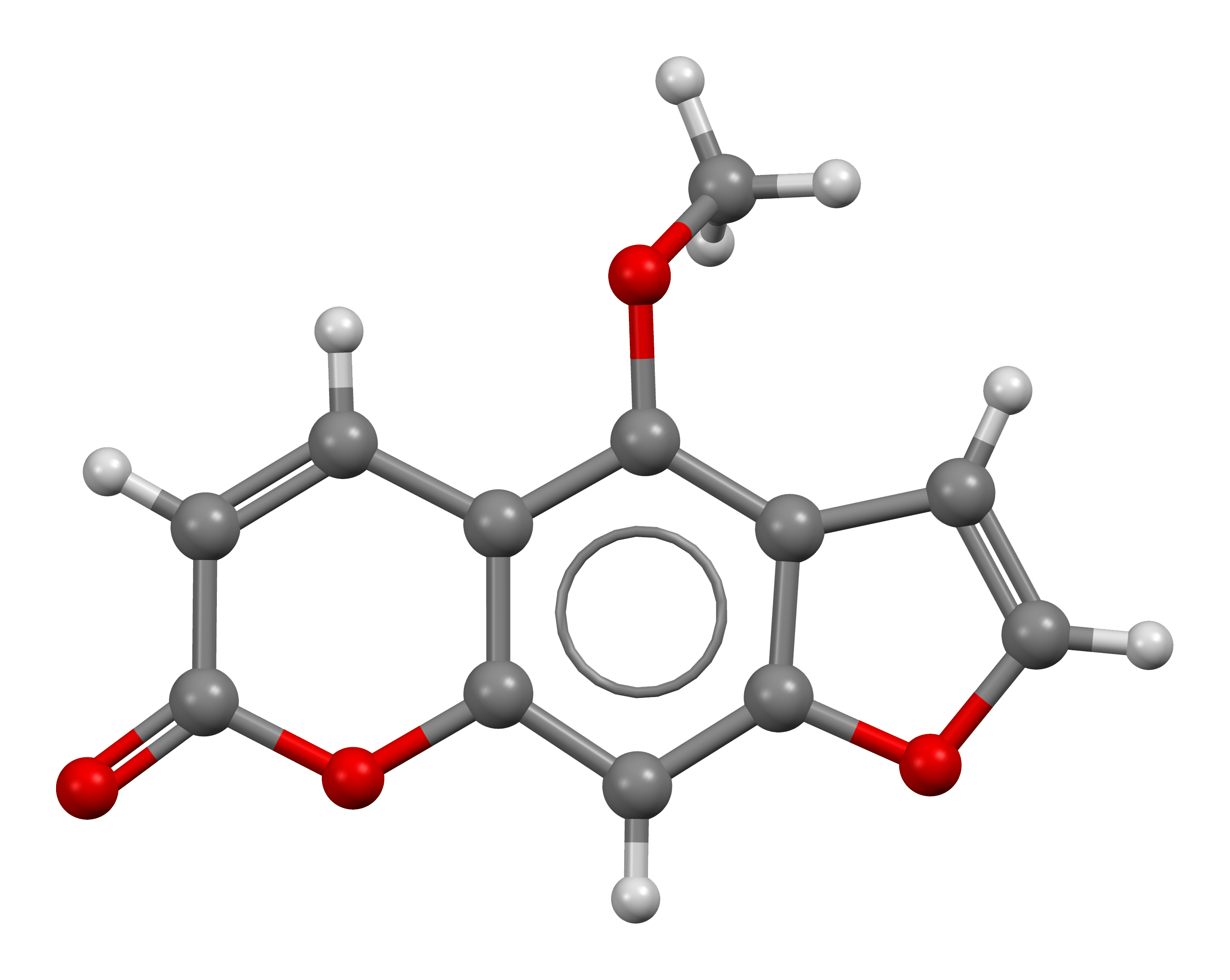
Bergapten (5-methoxypsoralen) is a furanocoumarin in some citrus fruits that causes skin inflammation when followed by ultraviolet light.

Some Citrus species contain significant amounts of furanocoumarins. In humans, some of these act as strong photosensitizers when applied topically to the skin, while others interact with medications when taken orally in the grapefruit juice effect. Due to the photosensitizing effects of certain furanocoumarins, some Citrus species cause phytophotodermatitis, a potentially severe skin inflammation resulting from contact with a light-sensitizing botanical agent followed by exposure to ultraviolet light. In Citrus species, the primary photosensitizing agent appears to be bergapten, a linear furanocoumarin derived from psoralen. This claim has been confirmed for lime and bergamot. In particular, bergamot essential oil has a higher concentration of bergapten (3–3.6 g/kg) than any other Citrus-based essential oil.

A systematic review indicates that citrus fruit consumption is associated with a 10% reduction of risk for developing breast cancer.

== Uses ==
=== Culinary ===
Many citrus fruits, such as oranges, tangerines, grapefruits, and clementines, are generally eaten fresh. They are typically peeled and can be easily split into segments. Grapefruit is more commonly halved and eaten out of the skin with a spoon. Lemonade is a popular beverage prepared by diluting the juice and adding sugar. Lemon juice is mixed in salad dressings and squeezed over fruit salad to stop it from turning brown: its acidity suppresses oxidation by polyphenol oxidase enzymes.

A variety of flavors can be derived from different parts and treatments of citrus fruits. The colorful outer skin of some citrus fruits, known as zest, is used as a flavoring in cooking. The whole of the bitter orange (and sometimes other citrus fruits) including the peel with its essential oils is cooked with sugar to make marmalade.

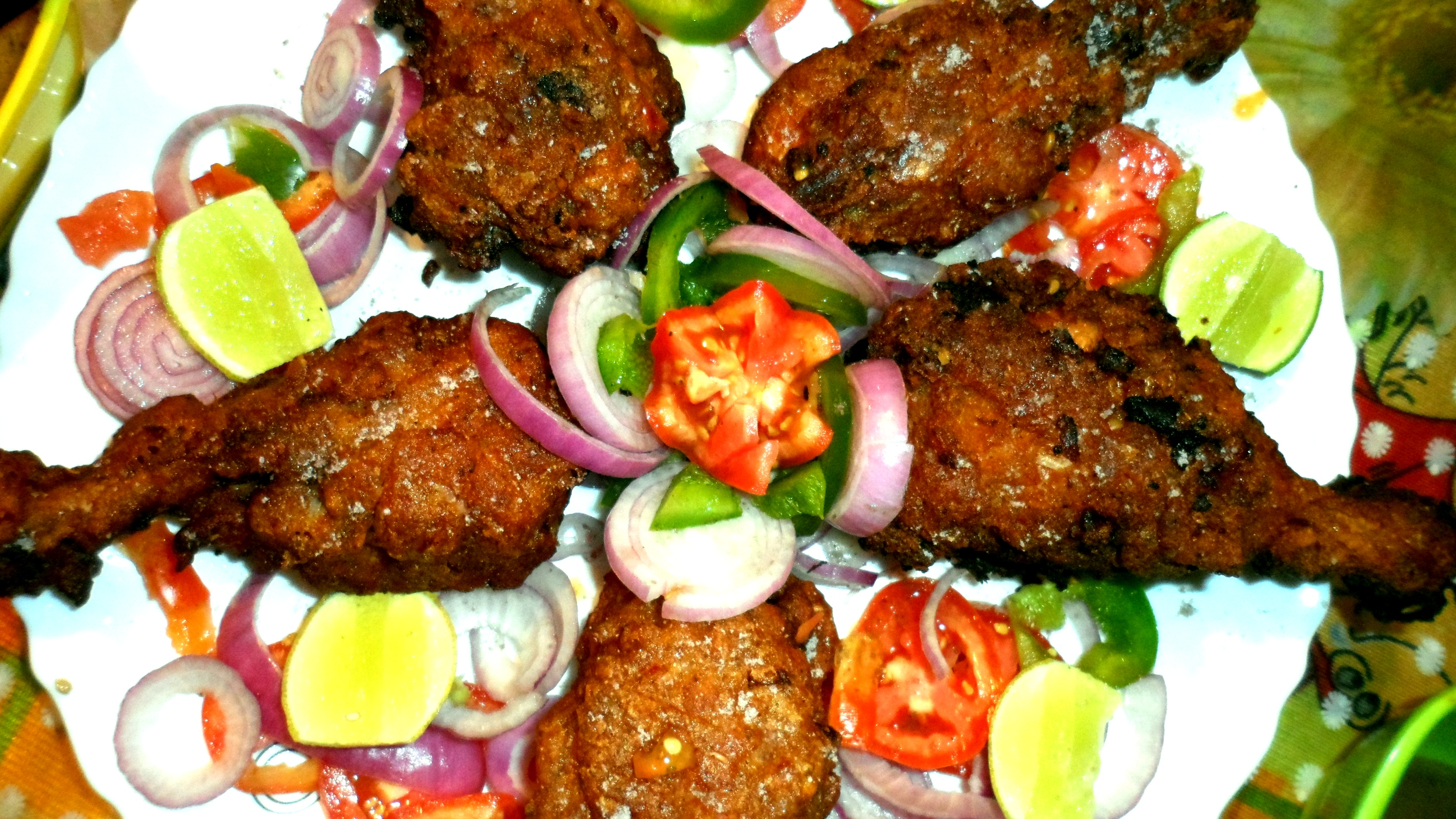
Fried chicken garnished with lemon and onion

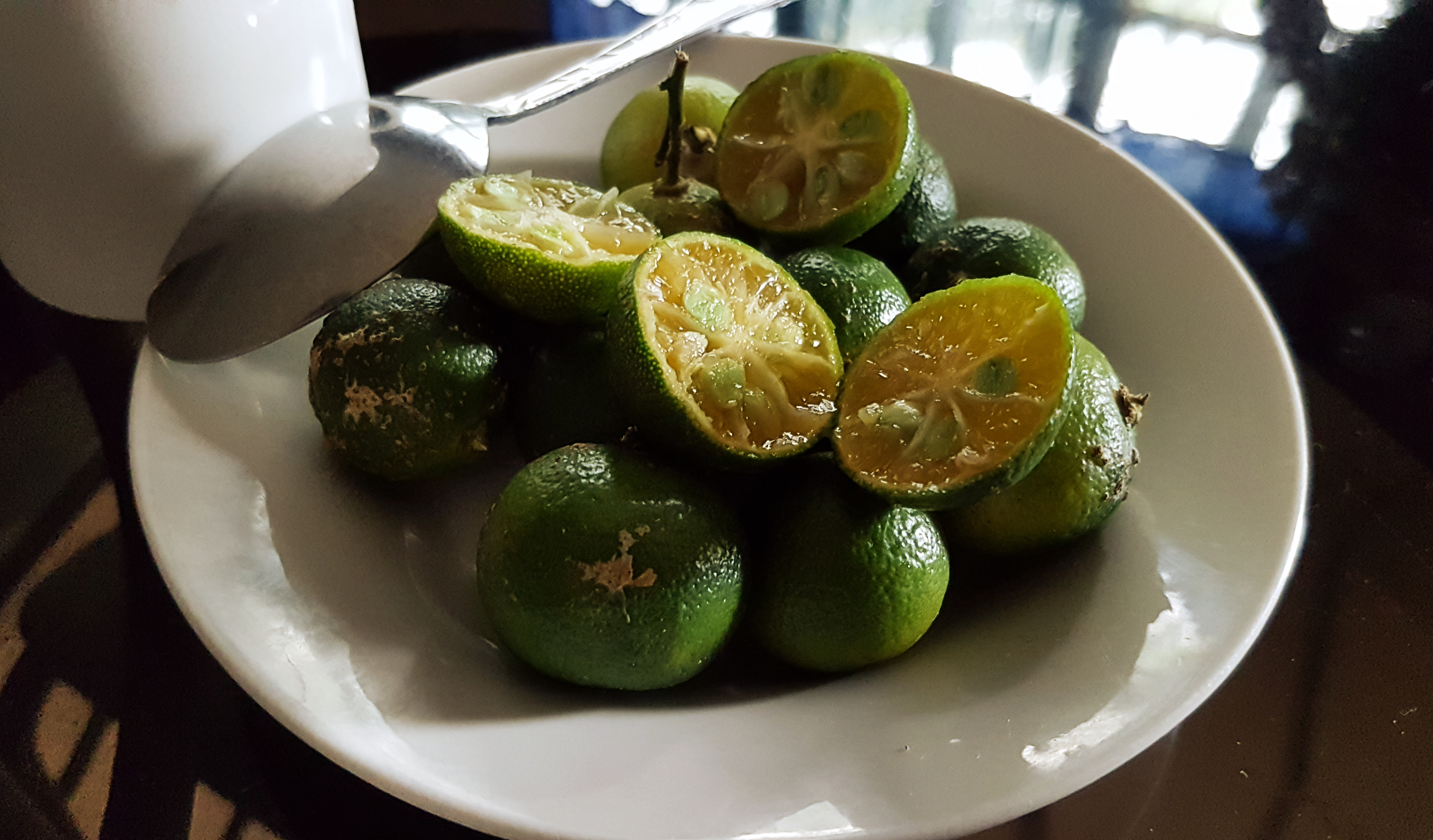
Calamansi, ubiquitous in Philippine condiments

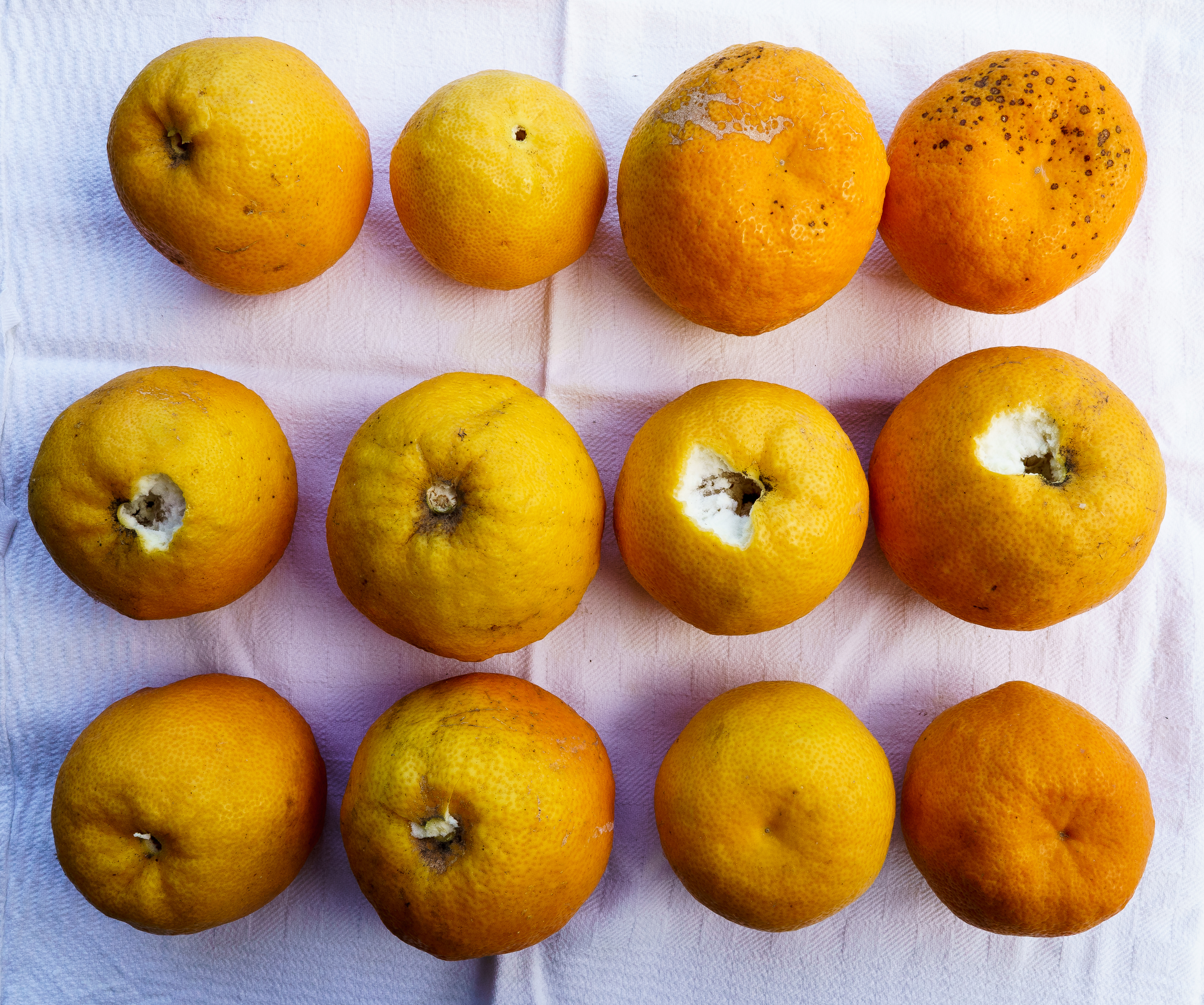
Bitter oranges (Citrus × aurantium) are used for marmalade.

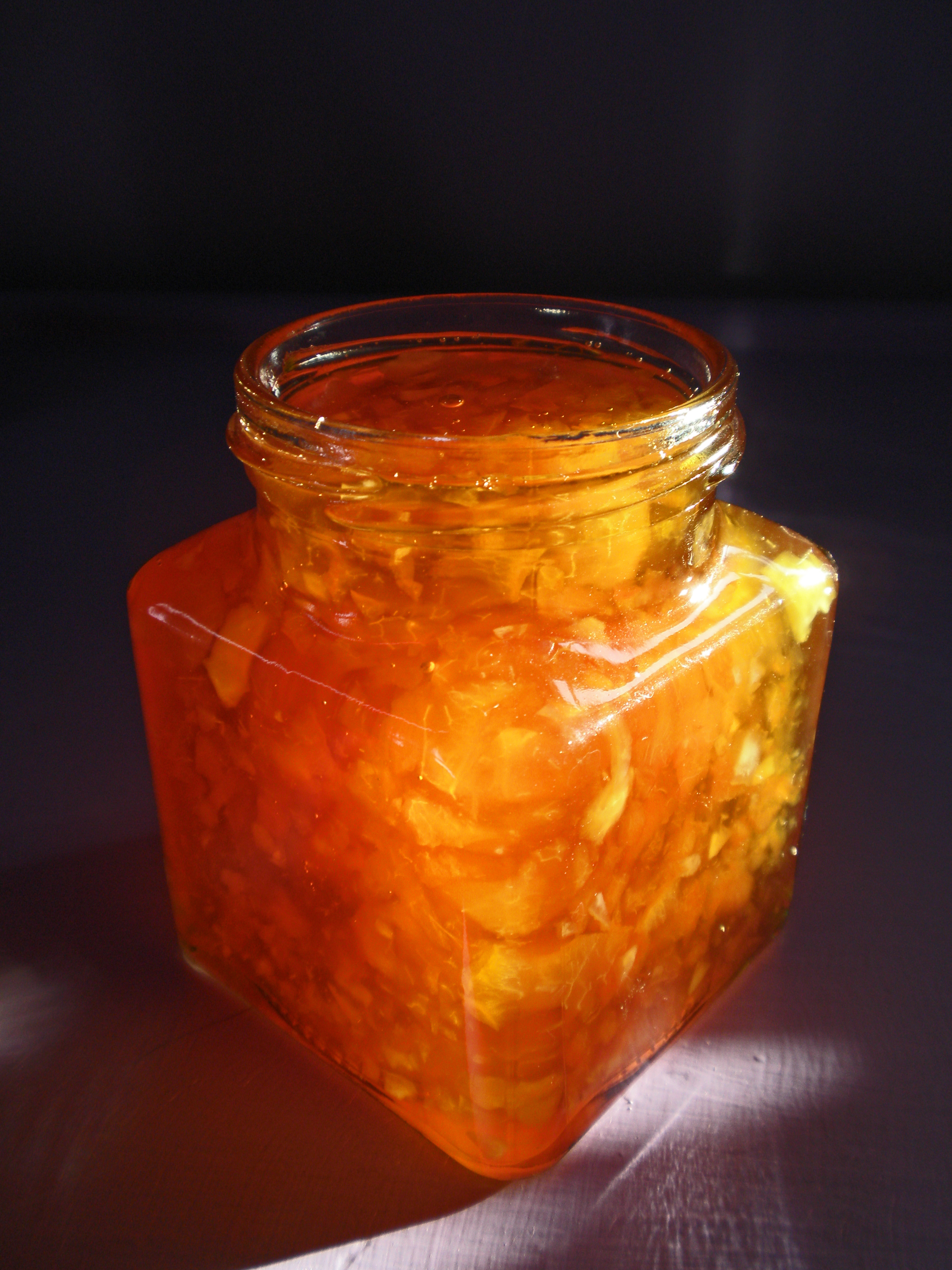
Marmalade, with orange peel

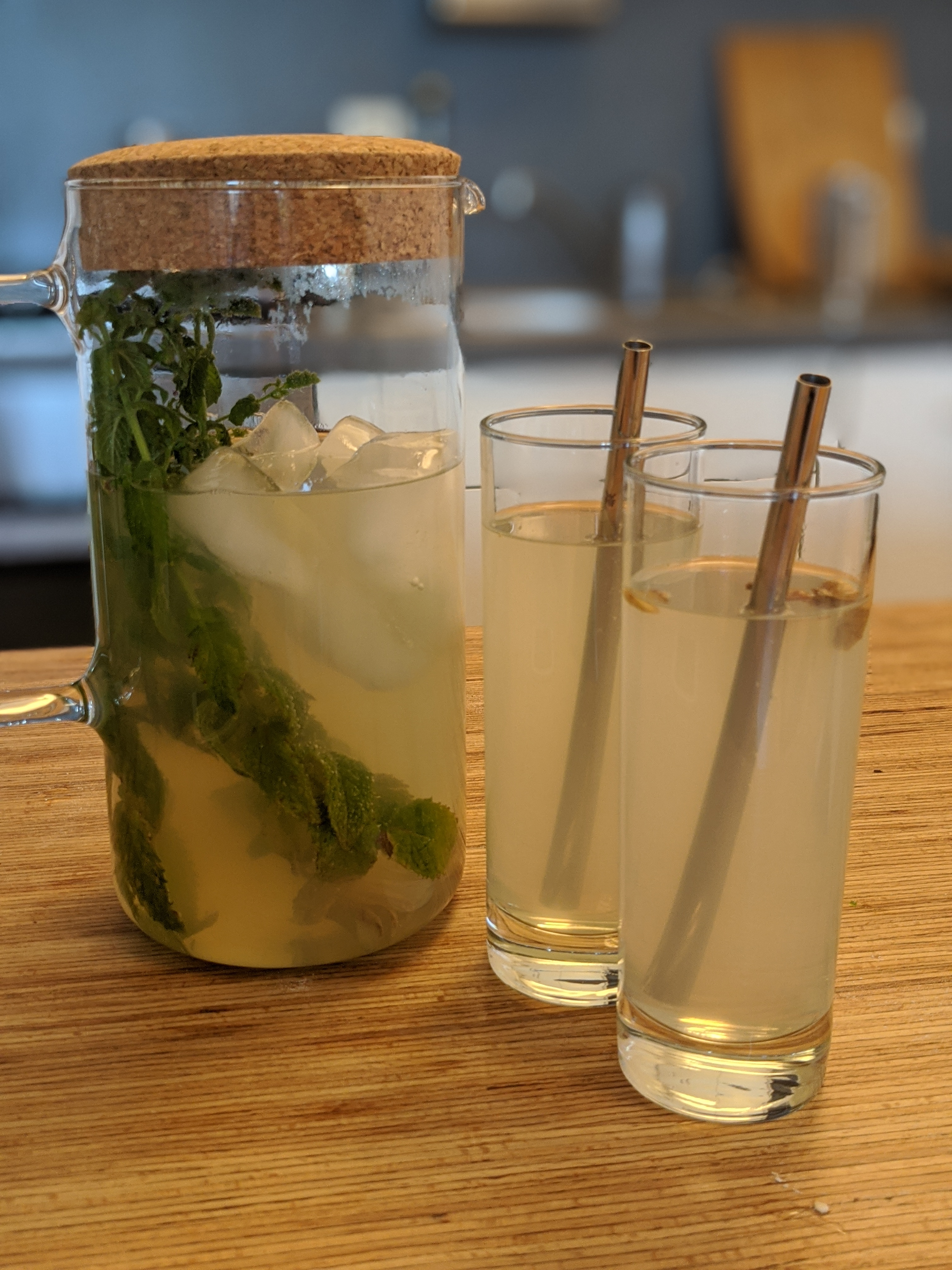
Lemonade

=== As ornamental plants ===
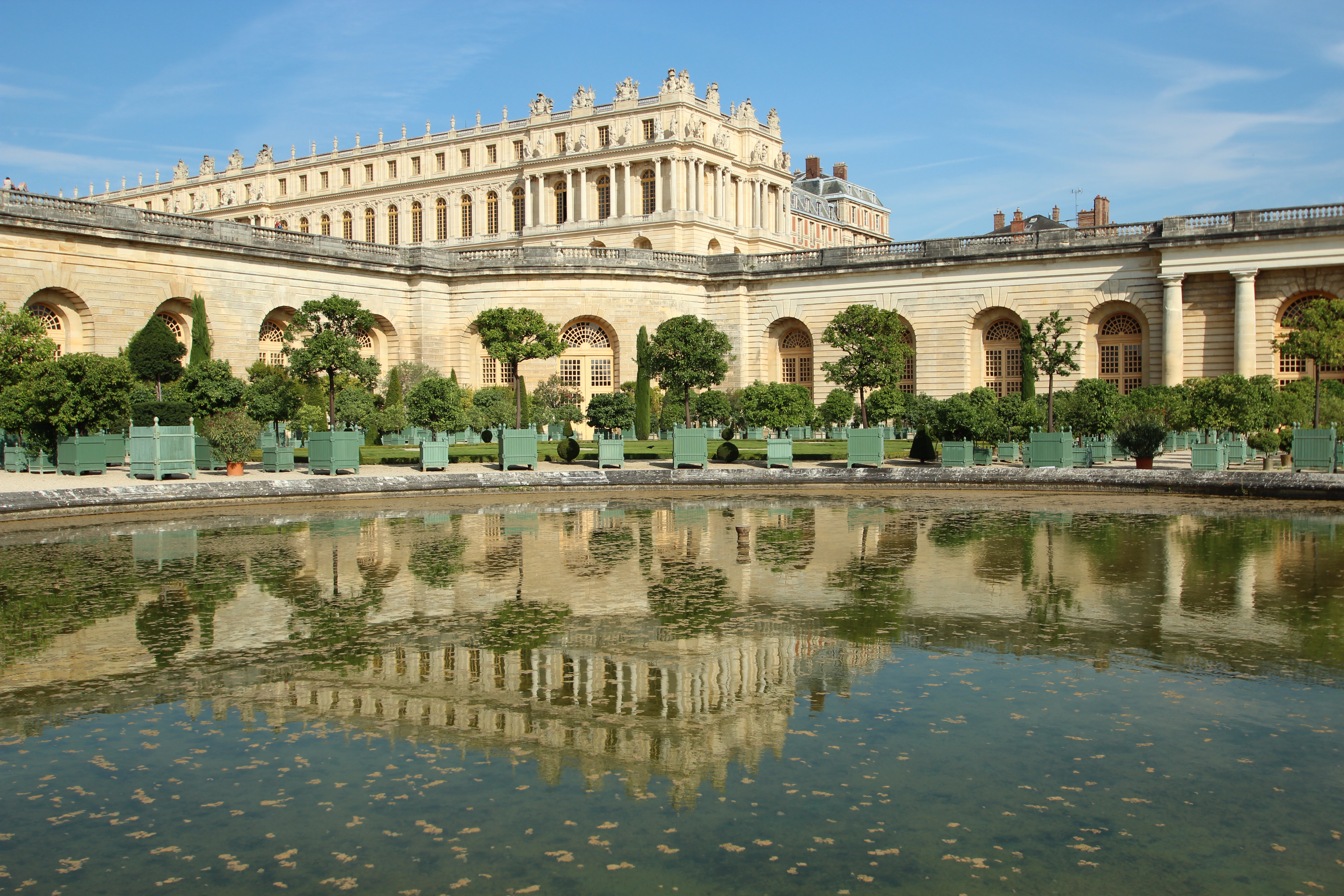
The Versailles Orangerie, 1686

By the 17th century, orangeries were added to great houses in Europe, both to enable the fruit to be grown locally and for prestige, as seen in the Versailles Orangerie. Some modern hobbyists grow dwarf citrus in containers or greenhouses in areas where the weather is too cold to grow it outdoors; Citrofortunella hybrids have good cold resistance.

== In art and culture ==
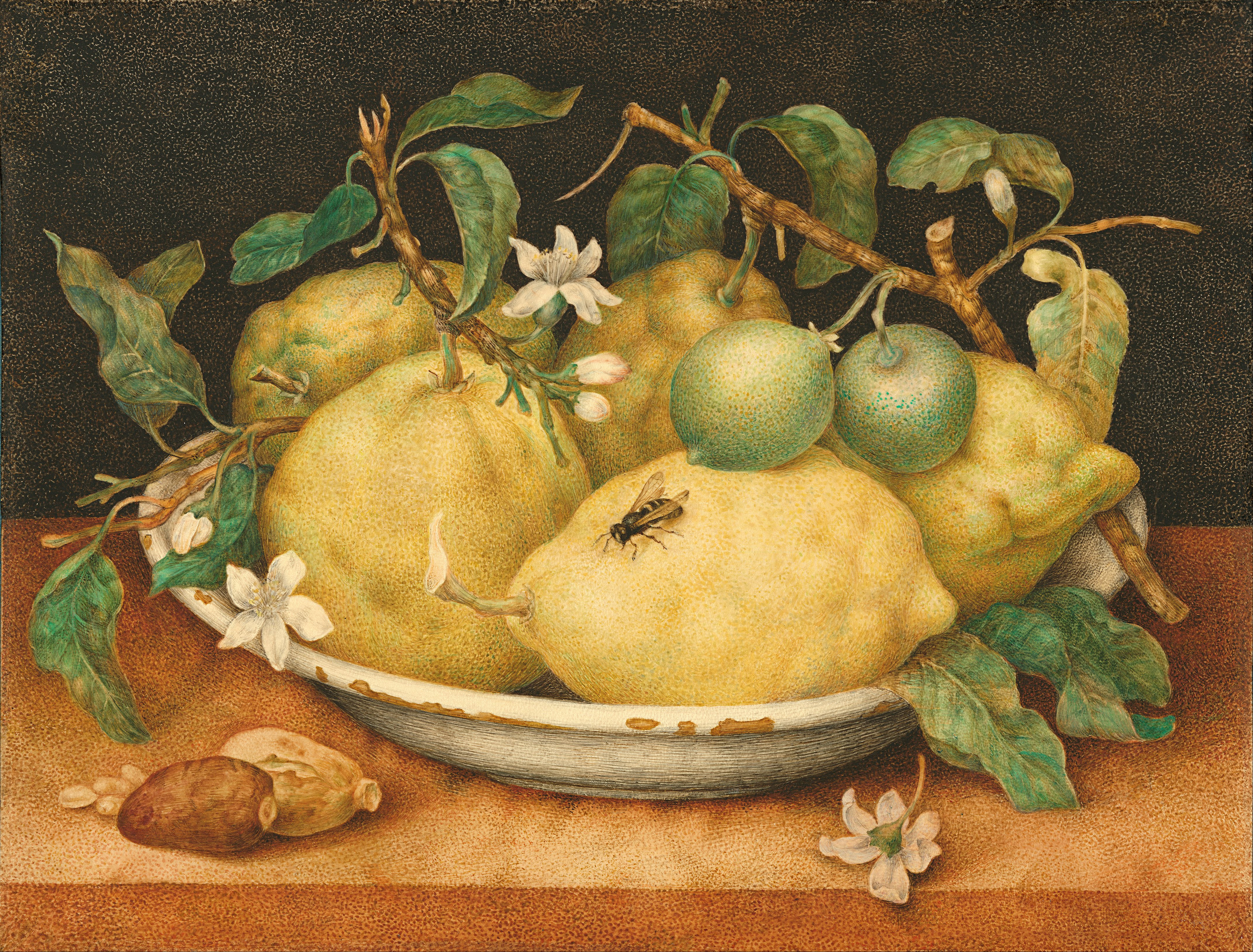
Giovanna Garzoni's Still Life with Bowl of Citrons, late 1640s

Lemons appear in paintings, pop art, and novels. A wall painting in the tomb of Nakht in 15th century BC Egypt depicts a woman in a festival, holding a lemon. In the 17th century, Giovanna Garzoni painted a Still Life with Bowl of Citrons, the fruits still attached to leafy flowering twigs, with a wasp on one of the fruits. The impressionist Edouard Manet depicted a lemon on a pewter plate. In modern art, Arshile Gorky painted Still Life with Lemons in the 1930s.

Citrus fruits "were the clear status symbols of the nobility in the ancient Mediterranean", according to the paleoethnobotanist Dafna Langgut. In Louisa May Alcott's 1868 novel Little Women, the character Amy March states that "It's nothing but limes now, for everyone is sucking them in their desks in schooltime, and trading them off for pencils, bead rings, paper dolls, or something else… If one girl likes another, she gives her a lime; if she's mad with her, she eats one before her face, and doesn't offer even a suck."

== See also ==
- Japanese citrus
