= Citrofortunella =

Genus of trees

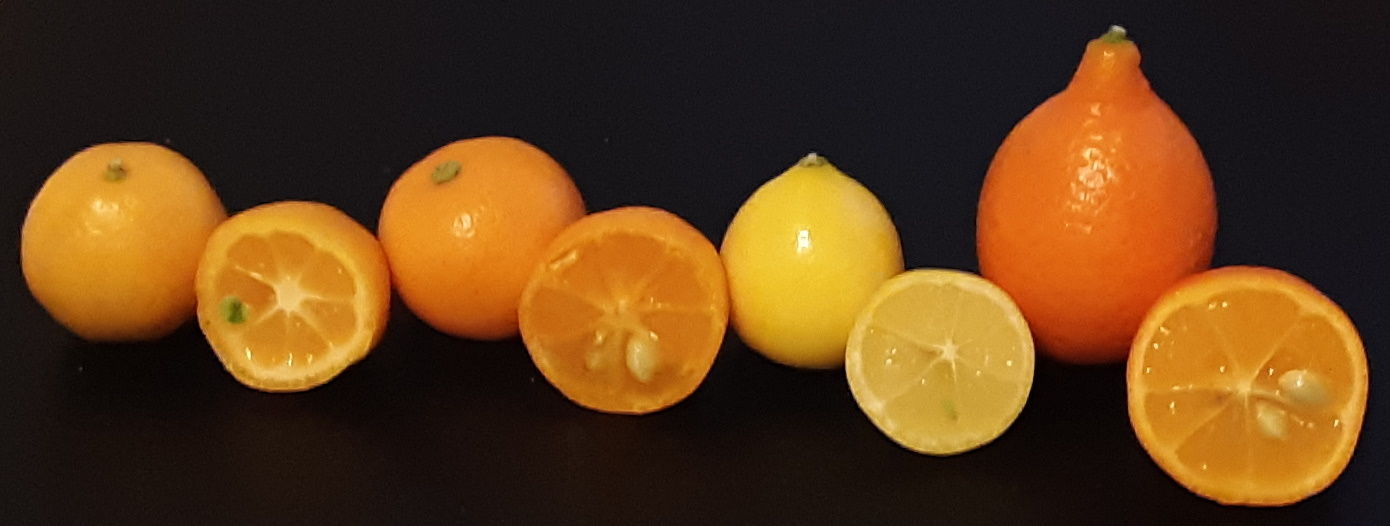
Citrofortunella varieties (left to right): Jiangsu kumquat, calamansi, limequat, mandarinquat

Citrofortunella are a large group of commercial hybrids that cross the kumquat with other citrus. In the system of citrus taxonomy established by Swingle, kumquats were placed in a different genus, Fortunella, from Citrus, which included citron, mandarin orange, pomelo and papedas. The result of genetic crosses between kumquats and these other citrus would then be intergeneric hybrids, so a novel genus name was coined for them in 1975, by compounding the names of the contributing genera to form Citrofortunella. That the genus is of a hybrid nature is represented by a multiplication sign before the genus name, for example × Citrofortunella microcarpa. Recent phylogenetic work has shown kumquats to fall within Citrus rather than belonging to a distinct genus, meaning these would no longer be considered intergeneric hybrids, and use of Citrofortunella as a distinct genus name for these hybrids loses taxonomic validity. All would be placed instead within Citrus.

These hybrids combine some of the edibility properties of the more typical Citrus species with the cold hardiness of the kumquats, often being referred to as cold hardy citrus. They produce small acidic fruit and are also more compact than other citrus, making them good ornamental plants.

Of this group, the calamansi has a long history of propagation in Asia as an ornamental plant and food flavoring, but many members of the group are of relatively recent (20th century) generation. These have been given similar common names, portmanteaus that combine the '-quat' ending of kumquat with an indication of the other parent citrus. Some have been assigned separate species names, though there is no agreement on the validity of these names. They can also be represented as a cross between the parent species. The citrofortunella include:

- Calamansi (or Calamondin)– (tangerine crossed with kumquat)
- Citrangequat – (citrange crossed with kumquat)
- Limequat – Citrofortunella floridana – (Key lime crossed with kumquat)
- Mandarinquat – varieties 'Nippon' and 'Indio' – (satsuma mandarin crossed with kumquat)
- Procimequat – (limequat crossed with kumquat)
- Sunquat – (probably Meyer lemon crossed with kumquat)
- Yuzuquat – (yuzu crossed with kumquat)
- Jiangsu kumquat - previously classified as a distinct species of kumquat, but revealed by karyotyping to be a kumquat hybrid
