= Mandarinquat =

Hybrid variety of citrus tree and fruit

Nippon Orangequat
- Species: C. unshiu x C. japonica
- Hybrid parentage: Citrus 'Satsuma' × Fortunella 'Meiwa'

Indio Mandarinquat
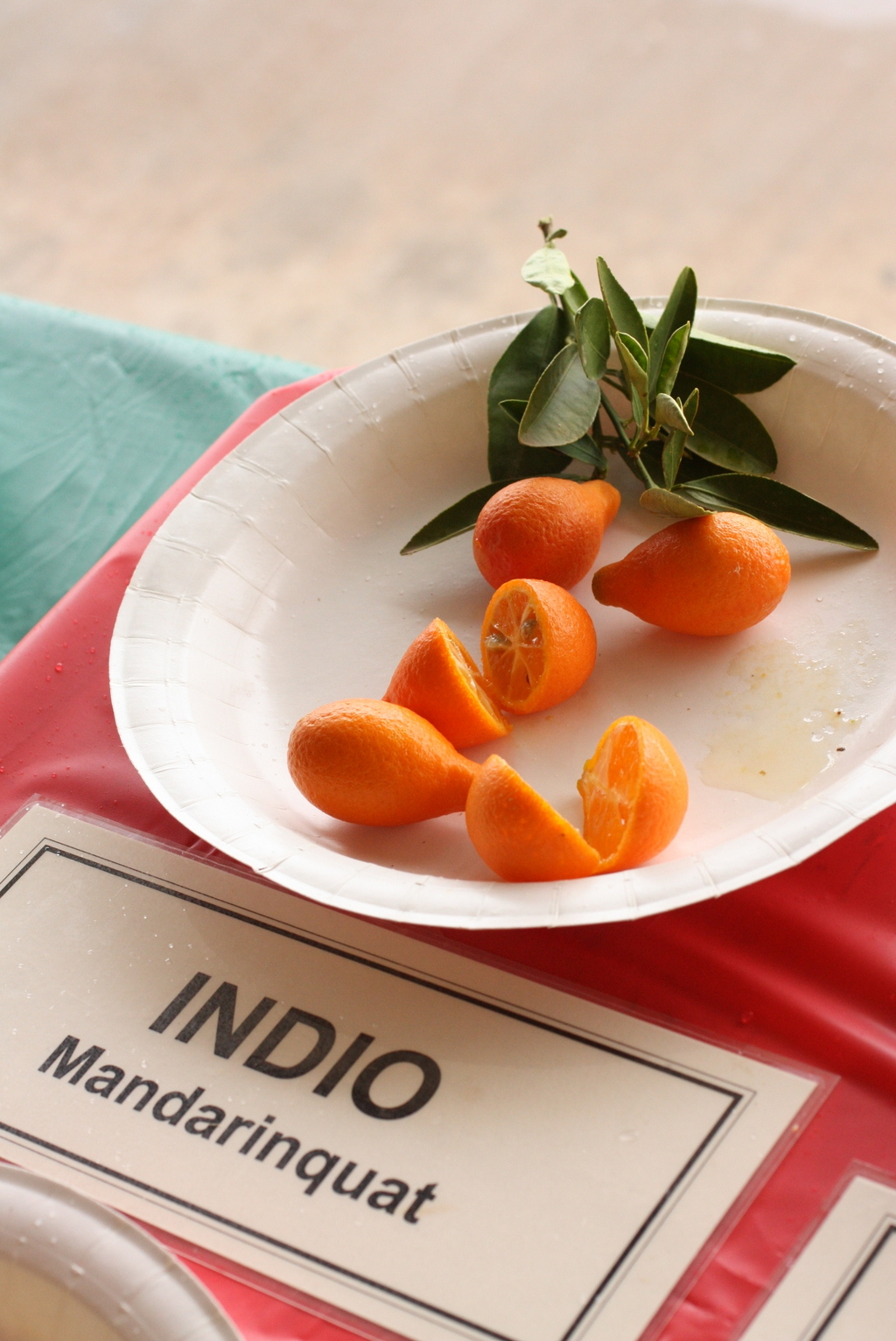
- Species: C. unshiu x C. japonica
- Hybrid parentage: Citrus 'Satsuma' × Fortunella 'Nagami'

The mandarinquat, also misleadingly called orangequat, is any cross between a mandarin and a kumquat (Citrus crassifolia). Mandarinquats are members of the citrofortunella group.

The variety Nippon orangequat was first introduced in 1932 by Dr. Eugene May of the USDA as a hybrid between the Meiwa kumquat and the Satsuma mandarin. A second variety, the Indio mandarinquat, was discovered as an open-pollinated seedling from a Nagami kumquat with an unknown pollen parent.

== Description ==
It is a small, round, orange fruit, which is larger than a kumquat. The fruit ranges from 2–4 cm (0.79–1.57 in) in circumference. Mandarinquat trees are small to medium in size; the leaves are usually long and narrow and dark green in color. The trunk and branches of the trees are slightly narrow, given the size of the trees. These trees can be seen with fruits on them through many of the colder months, since that is the season for Mandarinquat growing. Mandarinquat have not been genetically altered to be resistant to citrus canker, a citrus disease that causes small round sores on the fruit and its tree. The Mandarinquat also has not been bred to be seedless; it has a fair amount of rather large seeds inside. Mandarinquat fruits are typically eaten whole, like Kumquats; when ripe the sweet skin contrasts with the rather tart pulp and juice.

== Background ==
The Meiwa kumquat, a hybrid of a round and an oval kumquat, and the Satsuma mandarin are two fruits that were used to parent the Nippon mandarinquat. Both of these fruits are able to withstand cooler climates, the meiwa being partially dormant in the winter months and the satsuma maturing in October to December. Since both of these citruses are able to grow in the colder season, the mandarinquat inherited that trait and is also grown and harvested in the colder seasons. Both of the parents of the mandarinquat are grown in many countries of the world, like China, Japan, South Africa, and the United States of America. In the United States, mandarinquat are mainly grown in the Southern states like Florida and Alabama; however, they are also grown in California and other Western states.
