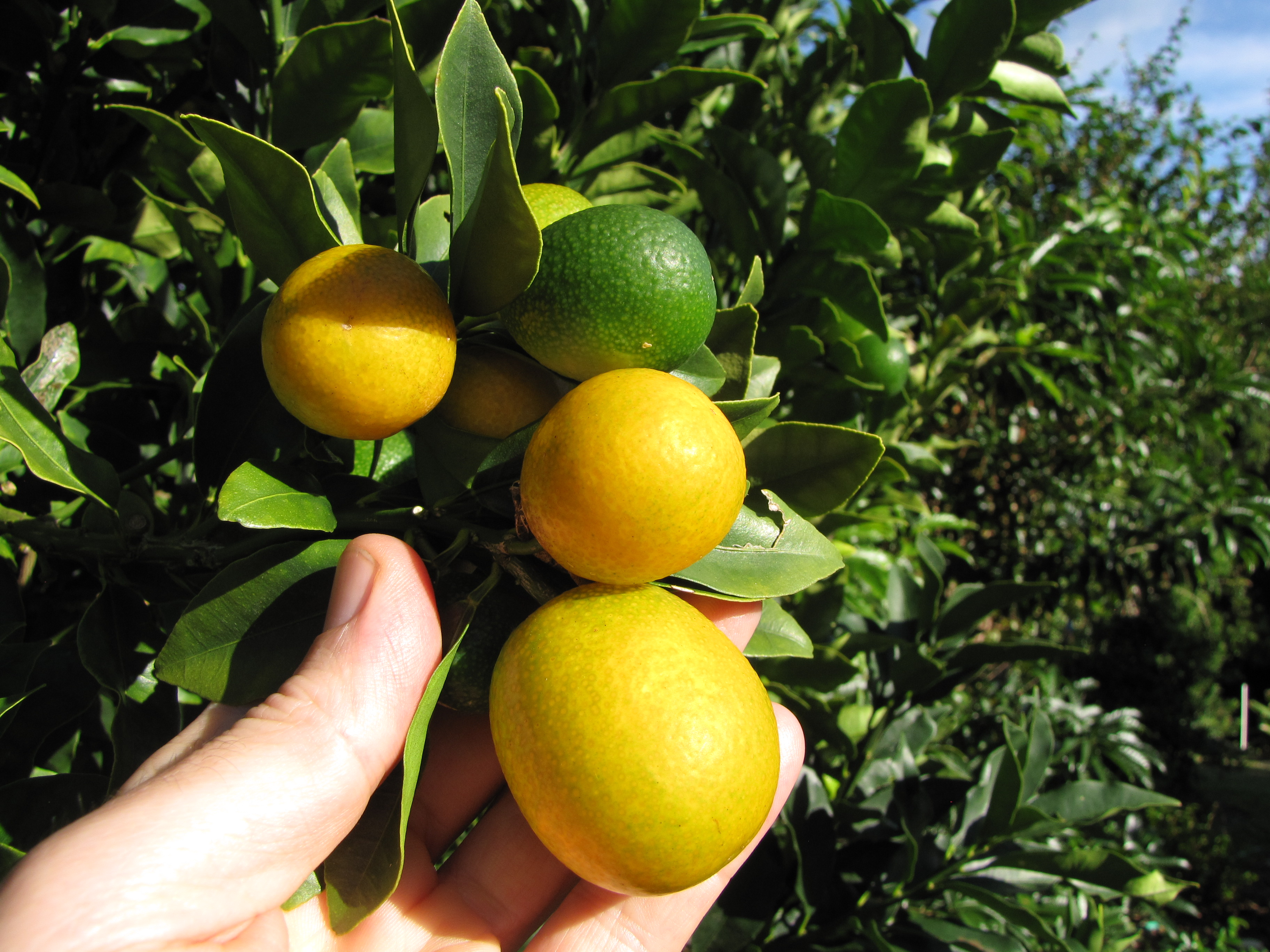
- Fruit

Scientific classification
- Kingdom: Plantae
- Clade: Embryophytes
- Clade: Tracheophytes
- Clade: Spermatophytes
- Clade: Angiosperms
- Clade: Eudicots
- Clade: Rosids
- Order: Sapindales
- Family: Rutaceae
- Genus: Citrus
- Species: C. crassifolia

Binomial name
- Citrus crassifolia Swingle, 1915

Synonyms
- Fortunella crassifolia; Fortunella x crassifolia

= Citrus crassifolia =

Species of kumquat

Citrus crassifolia, the Meiwa kumquat, is a species of kumquat; a type of citrus fruit in the genus Citrus, family Rutaceae. It was first described by the American botanist Walter Tennyson Swingle in 1915 as Fortunella crassifolia.

Initially, C. crassifolia was described as a synonym of Citrus japonica. However, recent phylogenetic analysis suggested that C. crassifolia is a single 'true' species.

C. crassifolia was brought to Japan from China at the end of the 19th century. It is a hybrid of Nagami (Citrus margarita) and Marumi (Citrus japonica). It has seedy oval fruits and thick leaves and was characterized as a different species by Swingle. Its fruit is typically eaten skin and all.
