= Procimequat =

Citrus fruit and plant

Procimequat is a triploid citrus hybrid or transgeneric hybrid, (Citrus aurantifolia 'Mexican' x Fortunella japonica) x Fortunella hindsii, in which the limequat that itself is a cross between lime and a round kumquat, was backcrossed with the primitive Hong Kong kumquat.

The tiny fruits are orange in color, and about the size of a marble. Like some kumquats, it is eaten entirely, including the peel. It tastes like a combination of lemon, orange and celery.

Despite being triploid, the procimequat does produce seeds, which are nucellar and thus produce plants identical to the parent, independent of the pollen source.

== See also ==
- Citrus taxonomy
