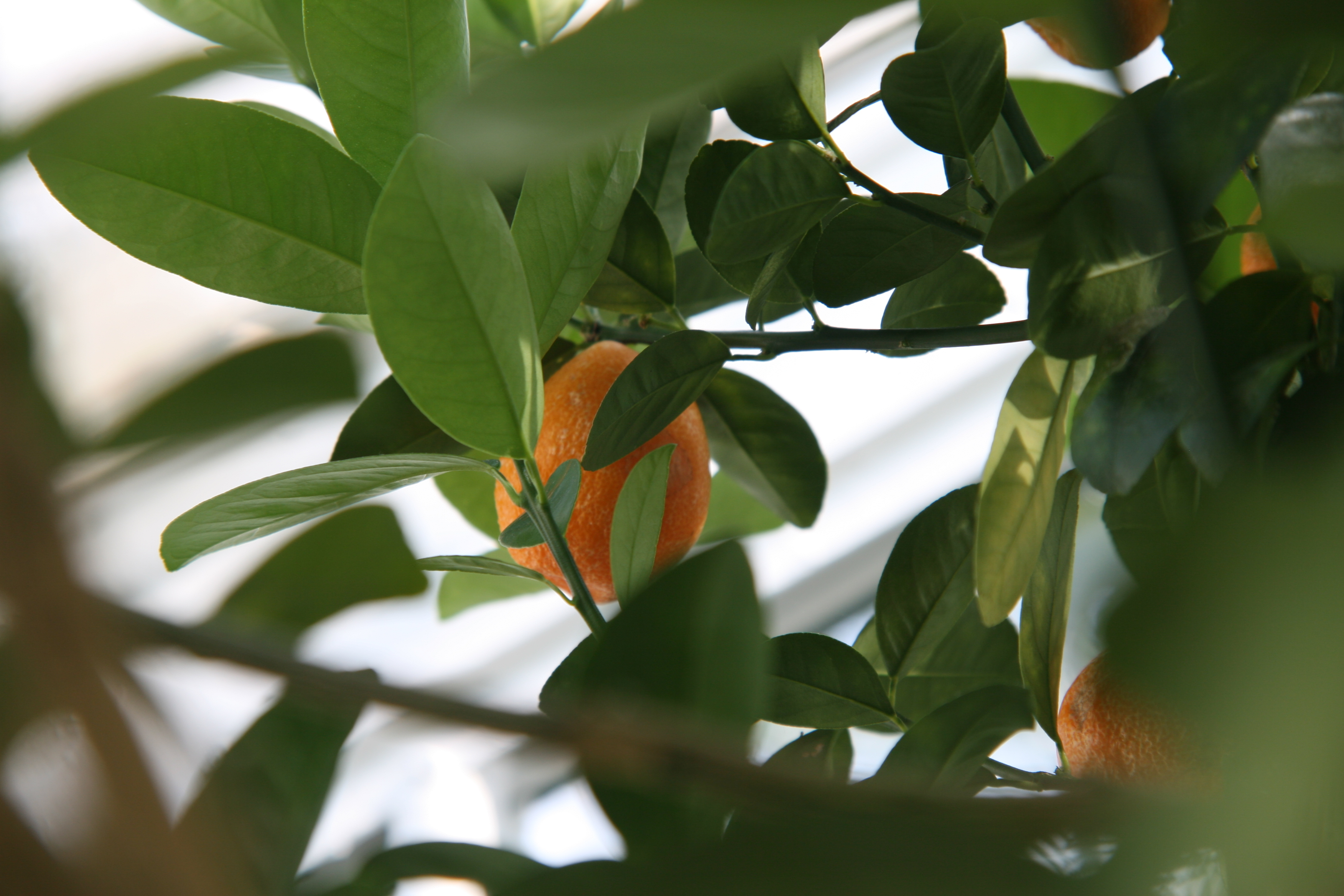

Scientific classification
- Kingdom: Plantae
- Clade: Embryophytes
- Clade: Tracheophytes
- Clade: Spermatophytes
- Clade: Angiosperms
- Clade: Eudicots
- Clade: Rosids
- Order: Sapindales
- Family: Rutaceae
- Genus: Citrus
- Species: C. obovata

Binomial name
- Citrus obovata (Rafinesque, 1838) Tanaka, 1927

Synonyms
- Fortunella obovata hort. ex Tanaka

= Citrus obovata =

Species of kumquat

Citrus obovata, the Jiangsu kumquat or Fukushu kumquat, is a species of kumquat; a type of citrus fruit in the genus Citrus, family Rutaceae. It was first described by the French biologist Constantine Samuel Rafinesque in 1838.

It was described by Tanaka in 1927 as a new species as well as a synonym of Citrus japonica. However, recent phylogenetic analysis suggested that C. obovata should be classified as natural or horticultural hybrids. Today, C. obovata is ranked a 'true' species.
