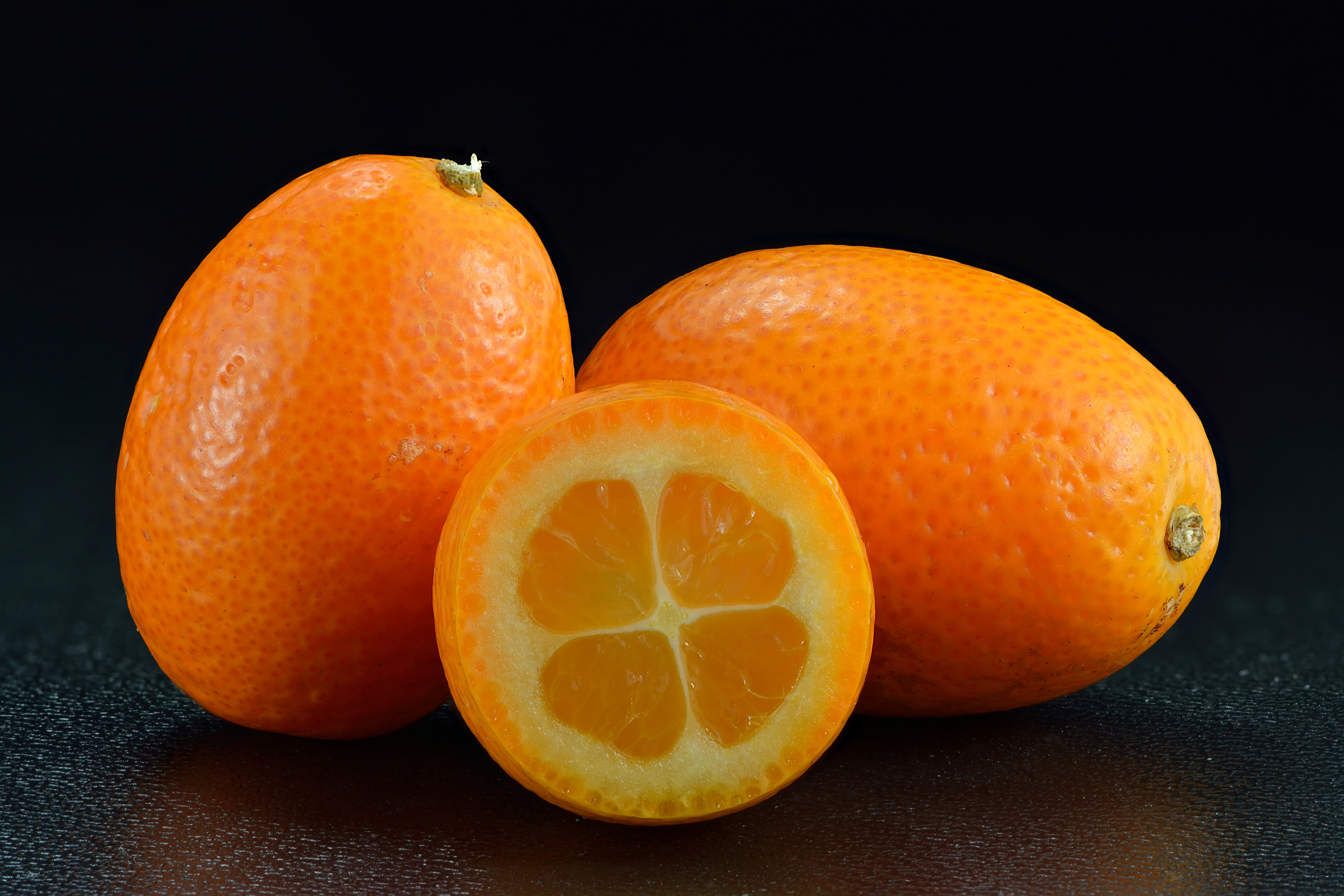

Scientific classification
- Kingdom: Plantae
- Clade: Tracheophytes
- Clade: Angiosperms
- Clade: Eudicots
- Clade: Rosids
- Order: Sapindales
- Family: Rutaceae
- Genus: Citrus
- Informal group: Kumquats

= Kumquat =

Species of small fruit-bearing tree

Kumquats (/ˈkʌmkwɒt/ KUM-kwot), sometimes spelled cumquat, are a group of small, angiosperm, fruit-bearing trees in the family Rutaceae. The edible fruit closely resembles the orange (Citrus x sinensis) in color, texture, and anatomy, but is much smaller, being approximately the size of a large olive. They are native to southern China but have been cultivated for centuries in Japan and Southeast Asia. The kumquat is a fairly cold-hardy citrus.

The taxonomy of kumquats is disputed. They were once classified as forming the historical genus Fortunella or placed within Citrus, sensu lato. Different classifications have assigned them ranging from a single species, Citrus japonica, to numerous species representing each cultivar. Recent genomic analysis defines three pure species, Citrus hindsii, C. margarita and C. crassifolia, with C. × japonica being a hybrid of the last two.

== Etymology ==
The English word kumquat is a borrowing of the Cantonese gām gwāt (IPA: [kɐ́m kʷɐ́t̚]; Chinese: 金橘), from gām 'golden' + gwāt 'mandarin orange'.

== Description ==
Kumquat plants have thornless branches and extremely glossy leaves. They bear dainty white flowers that occur in clusters or individually inside the leaf axils. The plants can reach a height from 2.5 to 4.5 meters (8 to 15 feet), with dense branches, sometimes bearing small thorns. They bear yellowish-orange fruits that are oval or round in shape. The fruits can be 2.5–5 centimeters (1–2 inches) in diameter and have a sweet, pulpy skin and slightly acidic inner pulp. The fruit is often eaten whole by humans and has a taste that is sweet and somewhat sour. Kumquat trees are self-pollinating.

== Species ==
Citrus taxonomy is complicated and controversial. Different systems place various types of kumquats in different species or unite them into as few as two species. Botanically, many varieties of kumquats are classified as their own species, rather than cultivars. Historically, they were viewed as falling within the genus Citrus, but the Swingle system of citrus taxonomy elevated them to their own genus, Fortunella. Recent phylogenetic analysis suggests they do fall within Citrus. Swingle divided the kumquats into two subgenera, the Protocitrus, containing the primitive Hong Kong kumquat, and Eufortunella, comprising the round, oval kumquat, Meiwa kumquats, to which Tanaka added two others, the Malayan kumquat and the Jiangsu kumquat. Chromosomal analysis suggested that Swingle's Eufortunella represent a single 'true' species, while Tanaka's additional species were revealed to be likely hybrids of Fortunella with other Citrus, so-called xCitrofortunella.

One recent genomic analysis concluded there was only one true species of kumquat, but the analysis did not include the Hong Kong variety, seen as a distinct species in all earlier analyses. A 2020 review concluded that genomic data were insufficient to reach a definitive conclusion on which kumquat cultivars represented distinct species. In 2022, a genome-level analysis of cultivated and wild varieties drew several conclusions. The authors found support for the division of kumquats into subgenera: Protocitrus, for the wild Hong Kong variety, and Eufortunella for the cultivated varieties, with a divergence predating the end of the Quaternary glaciation, perhaps between two ancestral populations isolated south and north, respectively, of the Nanling mountain range. Within the latter group, the oval, round, and Meiwa kumquat each showed a level of divergence greater than between other recognized citrus species, such as between pomelo and citron, and hence each merits species-level classification. Though Swingle had speculated that the Meiwa kumquat was a hybrid of oval and round kumquats, the genomic analysis suggested instead that the round kumquat was an oval/Meiwa hybrid.

Kumquat species
Image	Scientific name	Common name	Distribution
	Citrus hindsii	Hong Kong kumquat	China
	Citrus crassifolia	Meiwa kumquat	China, Japan
	Citrus margarita	oval kumquat, Nagami kumquat	China, Japan
	Citrus japonica	round kumquat, Marumi kumquat, Morgani kumquat	China, Japan
	Citrus obovata	Jiangsu kumquat, Fukushu kumquat	China, Japan
	Citrus swinglei	Malayan kumquat	Malay Peninsula

=== Hybrids ===
Hybrid forms of the kumquat include the following:

- Calamansi: mandarin orange x kumquat
- Citrangequat: citrange x kumquat
- Limequat: key lime x kumquat
- Mandarinquat: Satsuma mandarin x kumquat
- Procimequat: limequat x kumquat
- Sunquat: Meyer lemon (?) x kumquat
- Yuzuquat: yuzu x kumquat

== Origin and distribution ==
The kumquat plant is native to Southern China. The first historical reference to kumquats appears in literature of China from at least the 12th century. They have been cultivated for centuries in other parts of East Asia, South Asia, and Southeast Asia. They were introduced into Europe in 1846 by Robert Fortune, collector for the London Horticultural Society, and have spread across the world.

== Cultivation ==
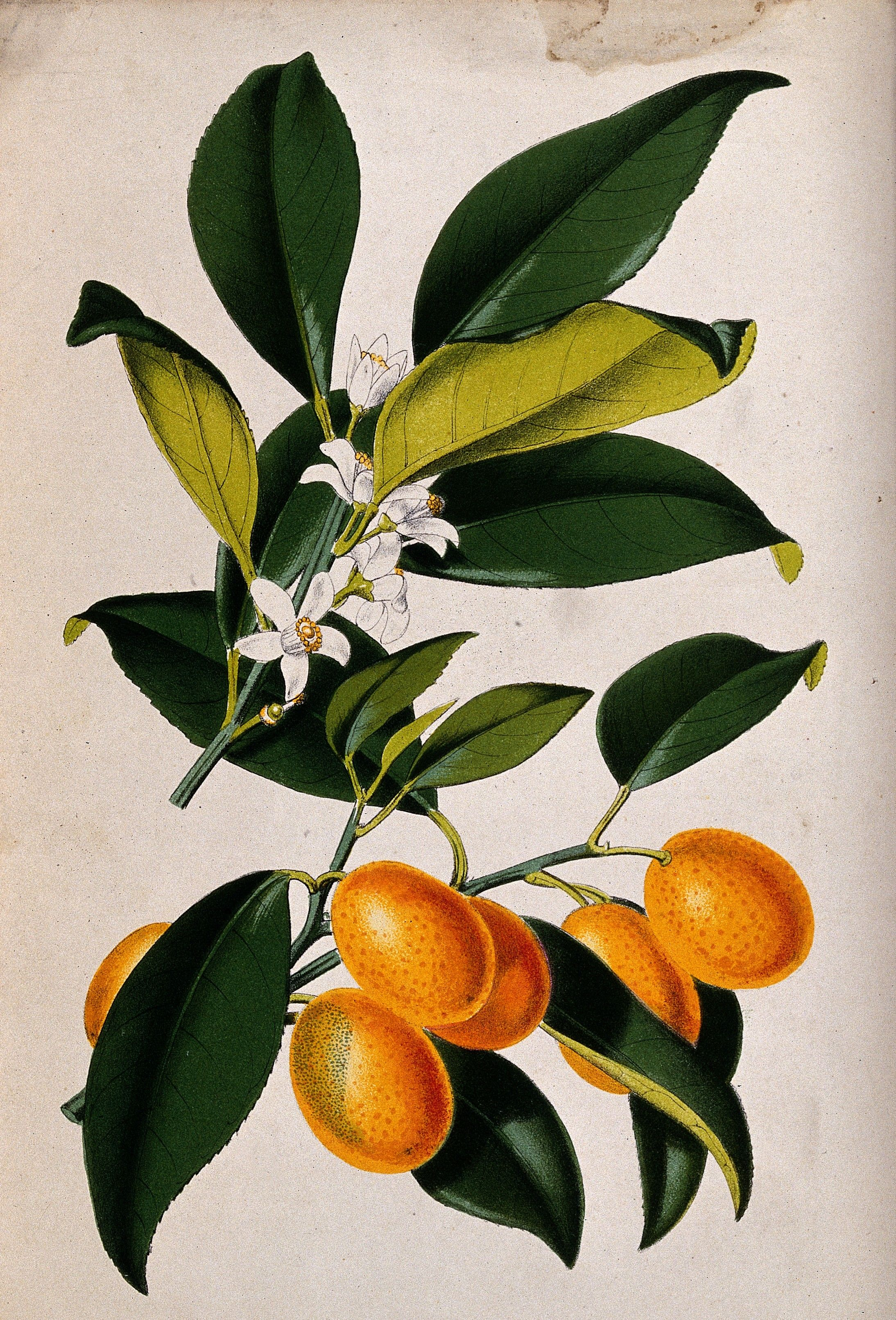
Illustration by Walter Hood Fitch

Kumquats are much hardier than citrus plants such as oranges. Sowing seeds in the spring is ideal because the temperature is pleasant, with more chances of rain and sunshine. This also gives the tree enough time to become well established before winter. Early spring is the best time to transplant a sapling. They do best in direct sunlight (needing 6–7 hours a day) and are planted directly in the ground. Kumquats do well in USDA hardy zones 9 and 10 and can survive in temperatures as low as 18 degrees Fahrenheit (−8 degrees Celsius). On trees mature enough, kumquats will form in about 90 days.

In cultivation in the UK, Citrus japonica has gained the Royal Horticultural Society's Award of Garden Merit (confirmed 2017).

=== Propagation ===
Kumquats do not grow well from seeds and so are vegetatively propagated by using rootstock of another citrus fruit, air layering, or cuttings.

=== Varieties ===
The Nordmann seedless is a seedless cultivar of the Nagami kumquat (Citrus margarita). It is similar to Nagami but with a slightly different shape and lighter skin.

The Centennial Variegated is another cultivar of the Nagami kumquat. It originated from the open pollination of a Nagami kumquat tree. The fruits are striped light green and yellow when underripe, and turn orange and lose their stripes when they ripen. They are oval-shaped, necked, 2.5 inches long, and have a smooth rind. They mature in winter. This cultivar arose spontaneously from the oval kumquat (Citrus margarita). It produces a greater proportion of fruit to peel than the oval kumquat, and the fruit is rounder and sometimes necked. Fruits are distinguishable by their variegation in color, exhibiting bright green and yellow stripes, and by their lack of thorns.

The Puchimaru kumquat is a seedless or virtually seedless Japanese kumquat cultivar. It is resistant to citrus canker and citrus scab. The fruit weighs 11–20 grams and is ellipsoid in shape. It has a dark orange rind, which is 4 millimeters thick. The juice content is relatively low. The oil glands are somewhat large and conspicuous. It ripens in January.

== Uses ==
=== Nutrition ===
Kumquats, raw (Fortunella spp.)
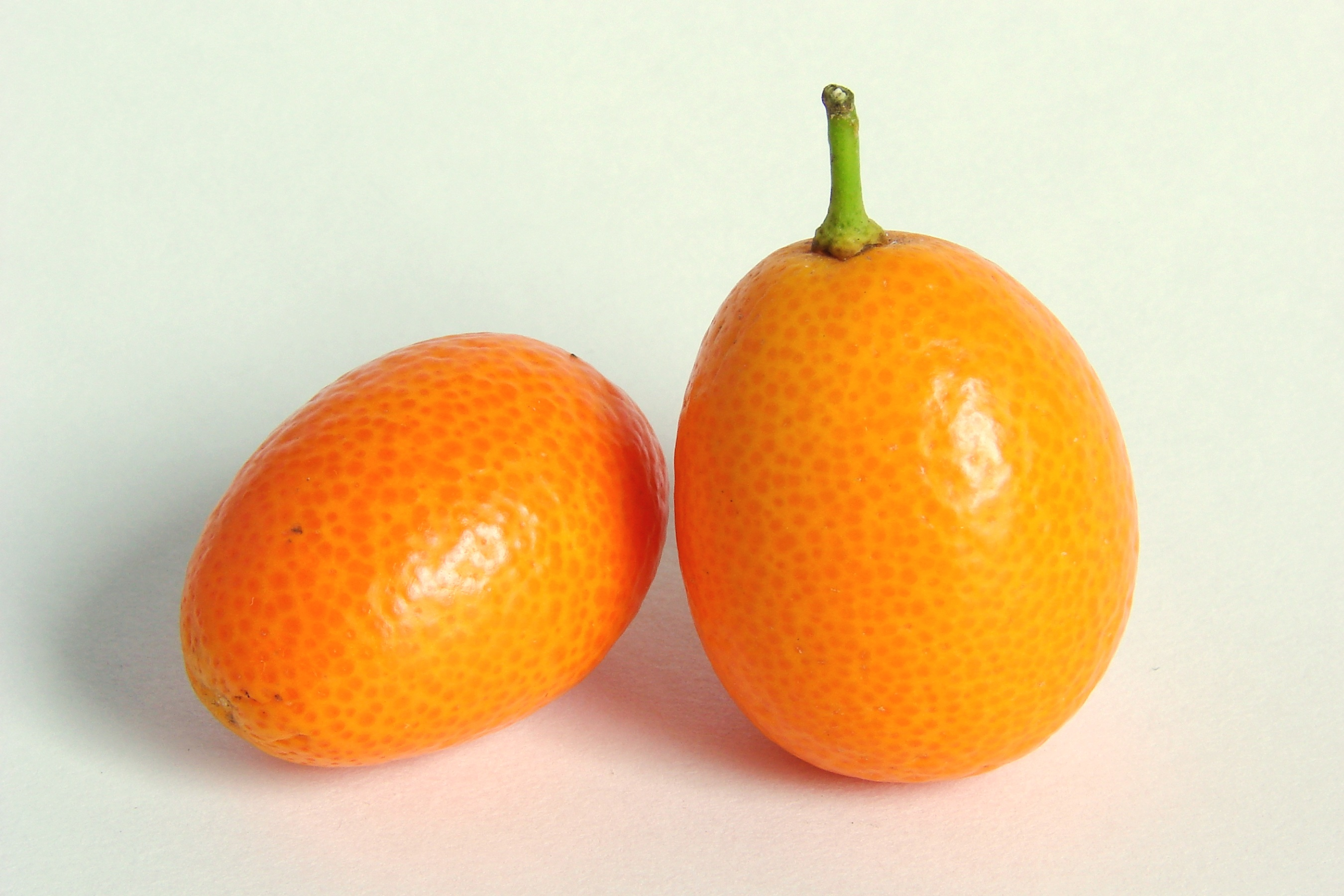

Nutritional value per 100 g (3.5 oz)
- Energy: 296 kJ (71 kcal)
- Carbohydrates: 15.9 g
- Sugars: 9.36 g
- Dietary fiber: 6.5 g
- Fat: 0.86 g
- Protein: 1.88 g
Vitamins and minerals
Vitamins	Quantity %DV^{†}
Vitamin A equiv. lutein zeaxanthin	2% 15 μg 129 μg
Thiamine (B1)	3% 0.037 mg
Riboflavin (B2)	7% 0.09 mg
Niacin (B3)	3% 0.429 mg
Pantothenic acid (B5)	4% 0.208 mg
Vitamin B6	2% 0.036 mg
Folate (B9)	4% 17 μg
Choline	2% 8.4 mg
Vitamin C	49% 43.9 mg
Vitamin E	1% 0.15 mg
Minerals	Quantity %DV^{†}
Calcium	5% 62 mg
Iron	5% 0.86 mg
Magnesium	5% 20 mg
Manganese	6% 0.135 mg
Phosphorus	2% 19 mg
Potassium	6% 186 mg
Sodium	0% 10 mg
Zinc	2% 0.17 mg
- Other constituents: Quantity
- Water: 82 g
- Link to USDA Database entry
- ^{†}Percentages estimated using US recommendations for adults, except for potassium, which is estimated based on expert recommendation from the National Academies.

A raw kumquat is 81% water, 16% carbohydrates, 2% protein, and 1% fat (table). In a reference amount of 100 grams (3 1/2 ounces), raw kumquat supplies 296 kilojoules (71 kilocalories) of food energy and is a rich source of vitamin C (49% of the Daily Value), with no other micronutrients in significant content (table).

=== Essential oil ===
The essential oil of the kumquat peel contains much of the aroma of the fruit, and is composed principally of limonene, which makes up around 93% of the total. Besides limonene and alpha-pinene (0.34%), both of which are considered monoterpenes, the oil is unusually rich (0.38% total) in sesquiterpenes such as α-bergamotene (0.021%), caryophyllene (0.18%), α-humulene (0.07%) and α-muurolene (0.06%), and these contribute to the spicy and woody flavor of the fruit. Carbonyl compounds make up much of the remainder, and these are responsible for much of the distinctive flavor. These compounds include esters such as isopropyl propanoate (1.8%) and terpinyl acetate (1.26%); ketones such as carvone (0.175%); and a range of aldehydes such as citronellal (0.6%) and 2-methylundecanal. Other oxygenated compounds include nerol (0.22%) and trans-linalool oxide (0.15%).

== Gallery ==
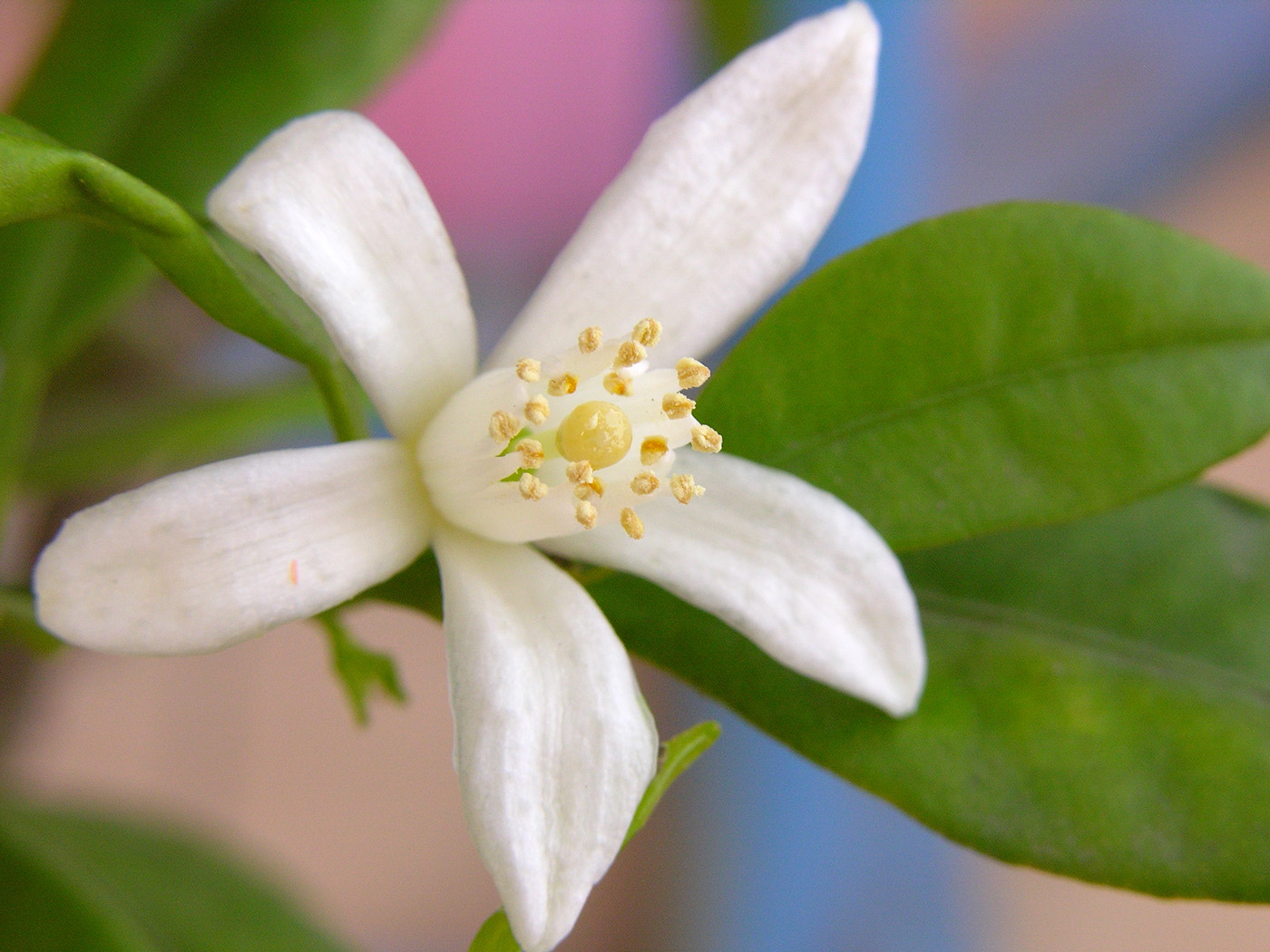
Kumquat flower

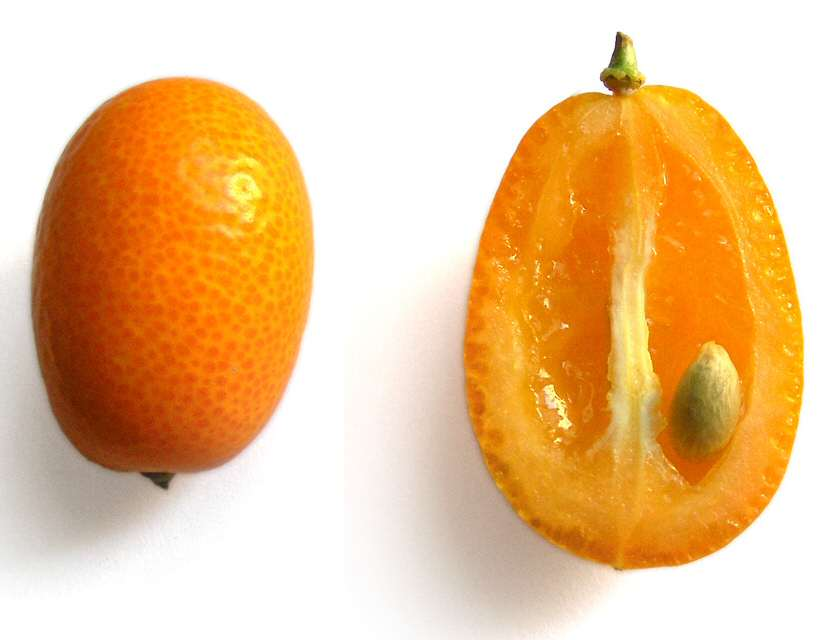
Kumquat fruit cross-section

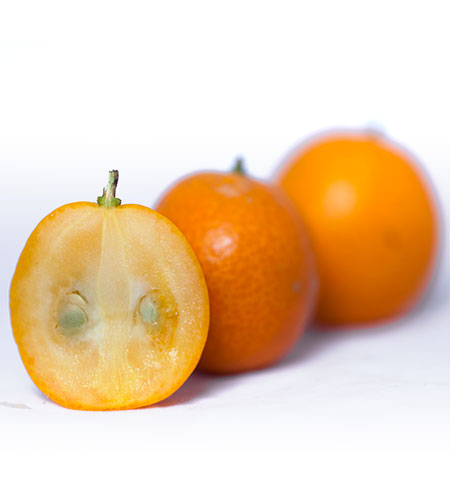
Kumquat whole and sectioned

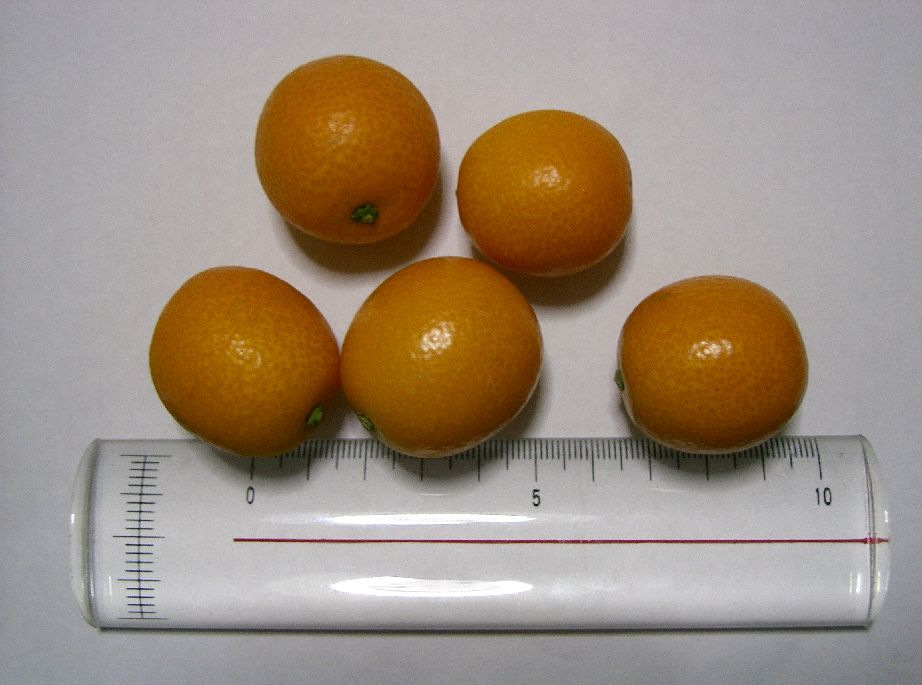
Round kumquats (or citrofortunella)

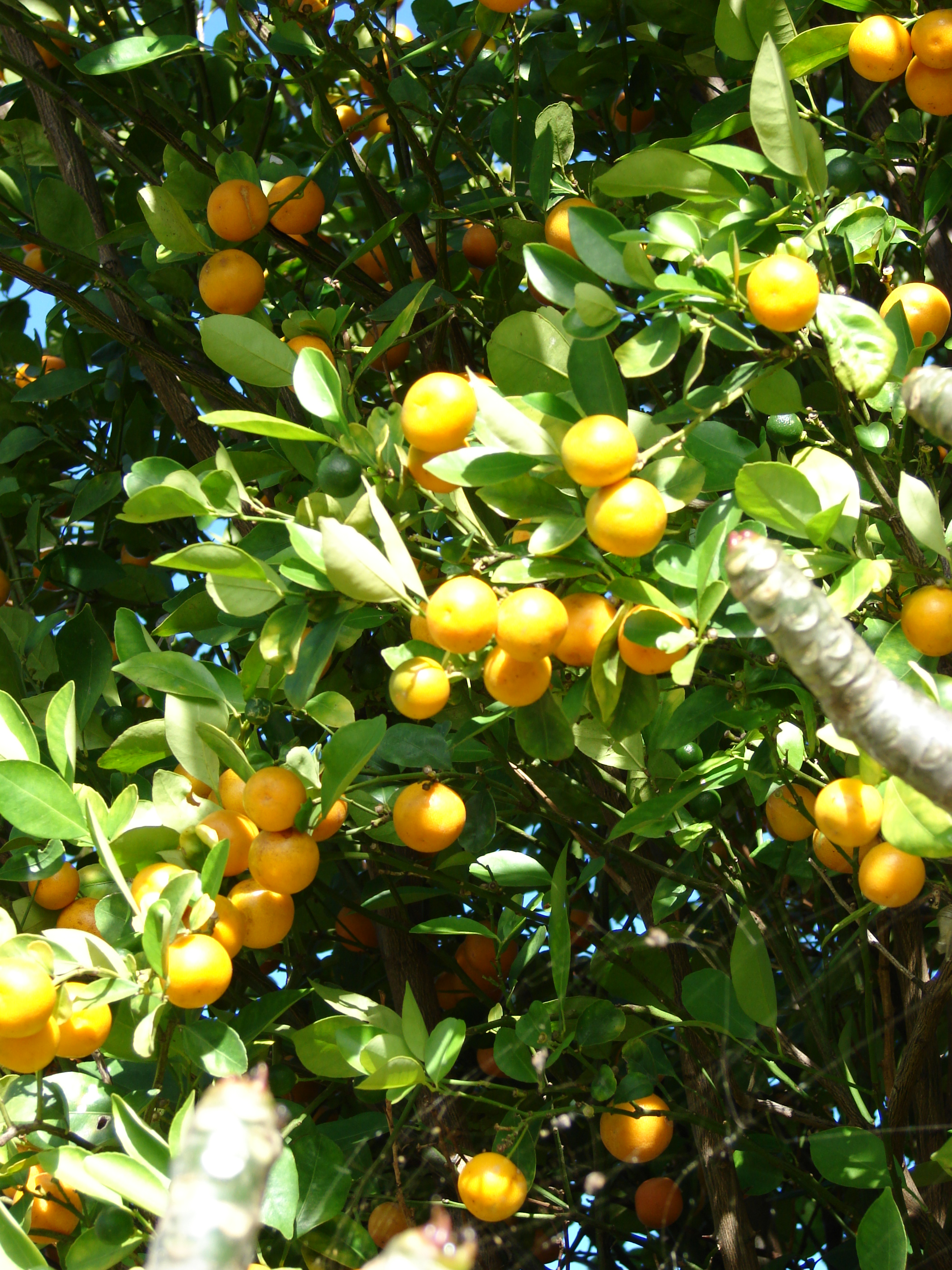
Round kumquats (or citrofortunella)

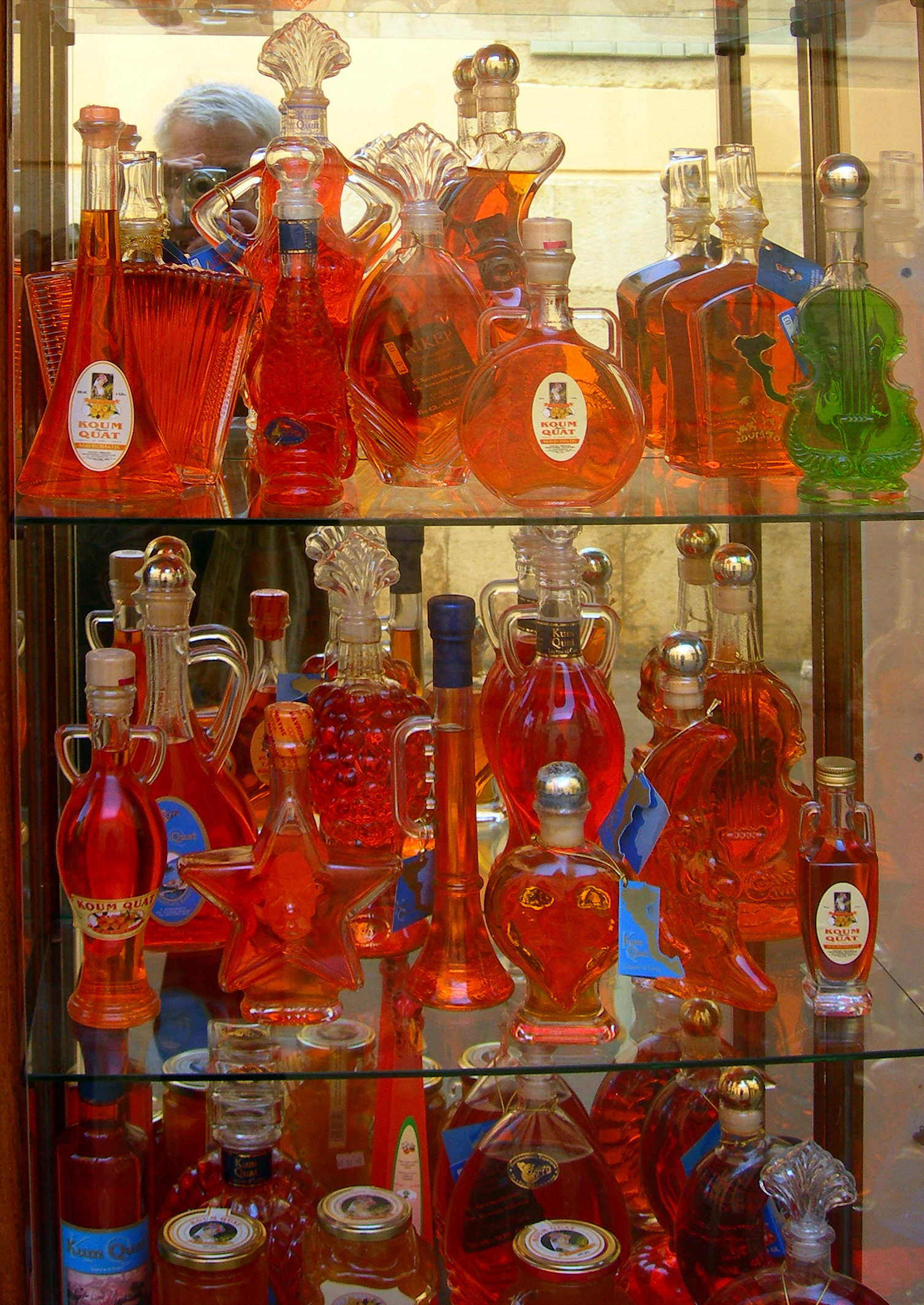
Kumquat liqueurs from Corfu, Greece

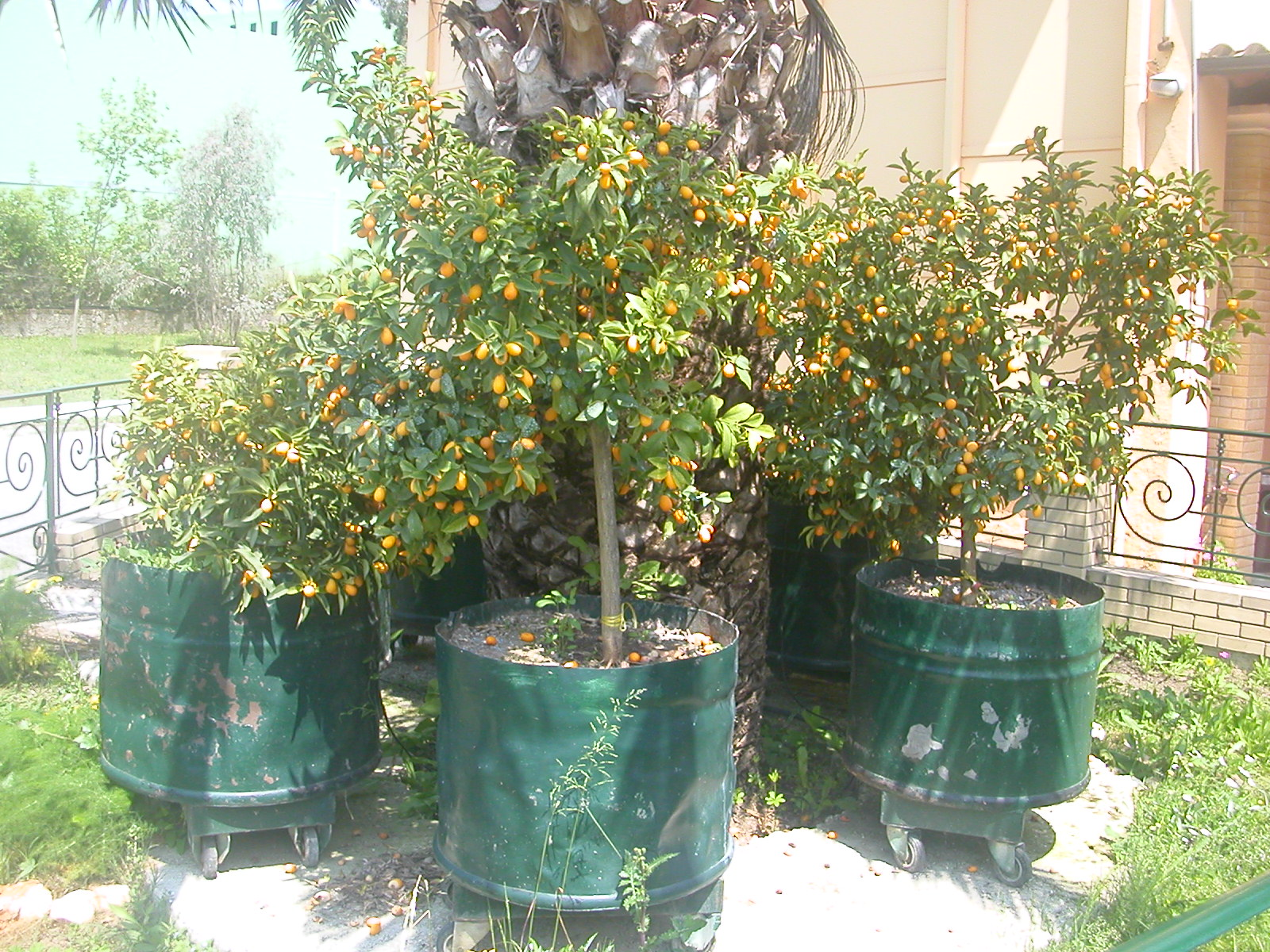
Potted kumquat trees at a kumquat liqueur distillery in Corfu.

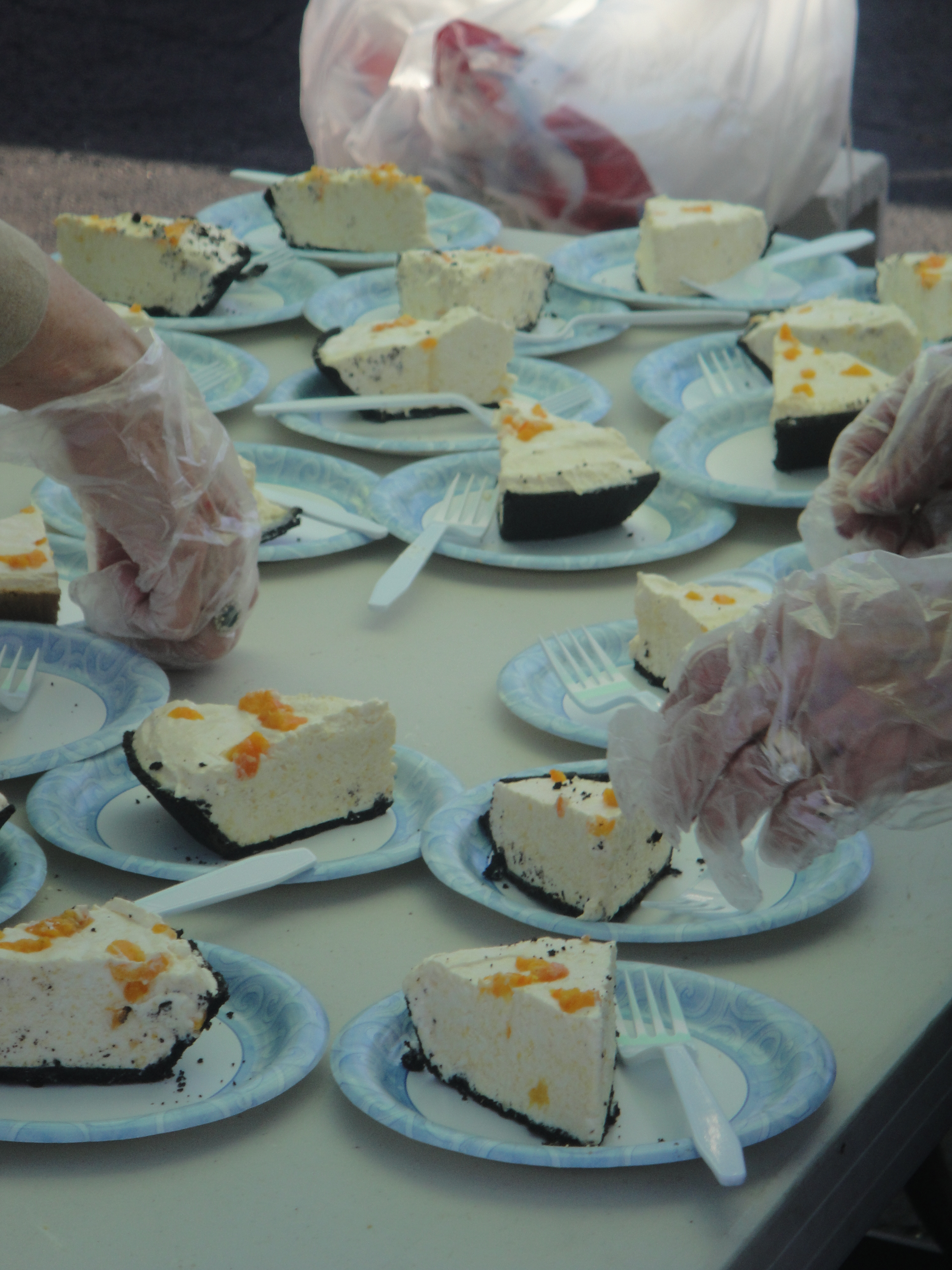
Slices of kumquat pie at the Kumquat Festival in Dade City, Florida

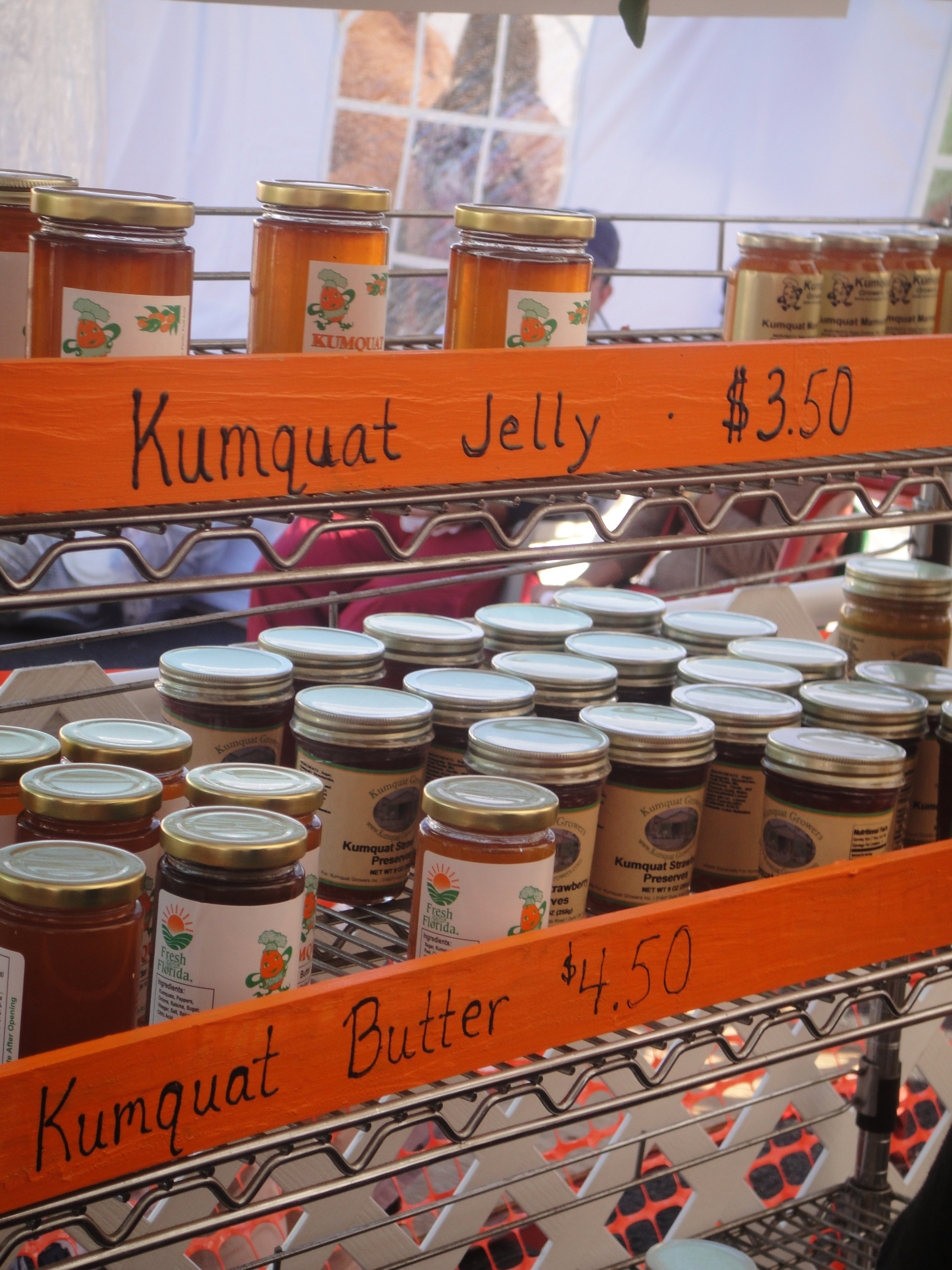
Kumquat preserves

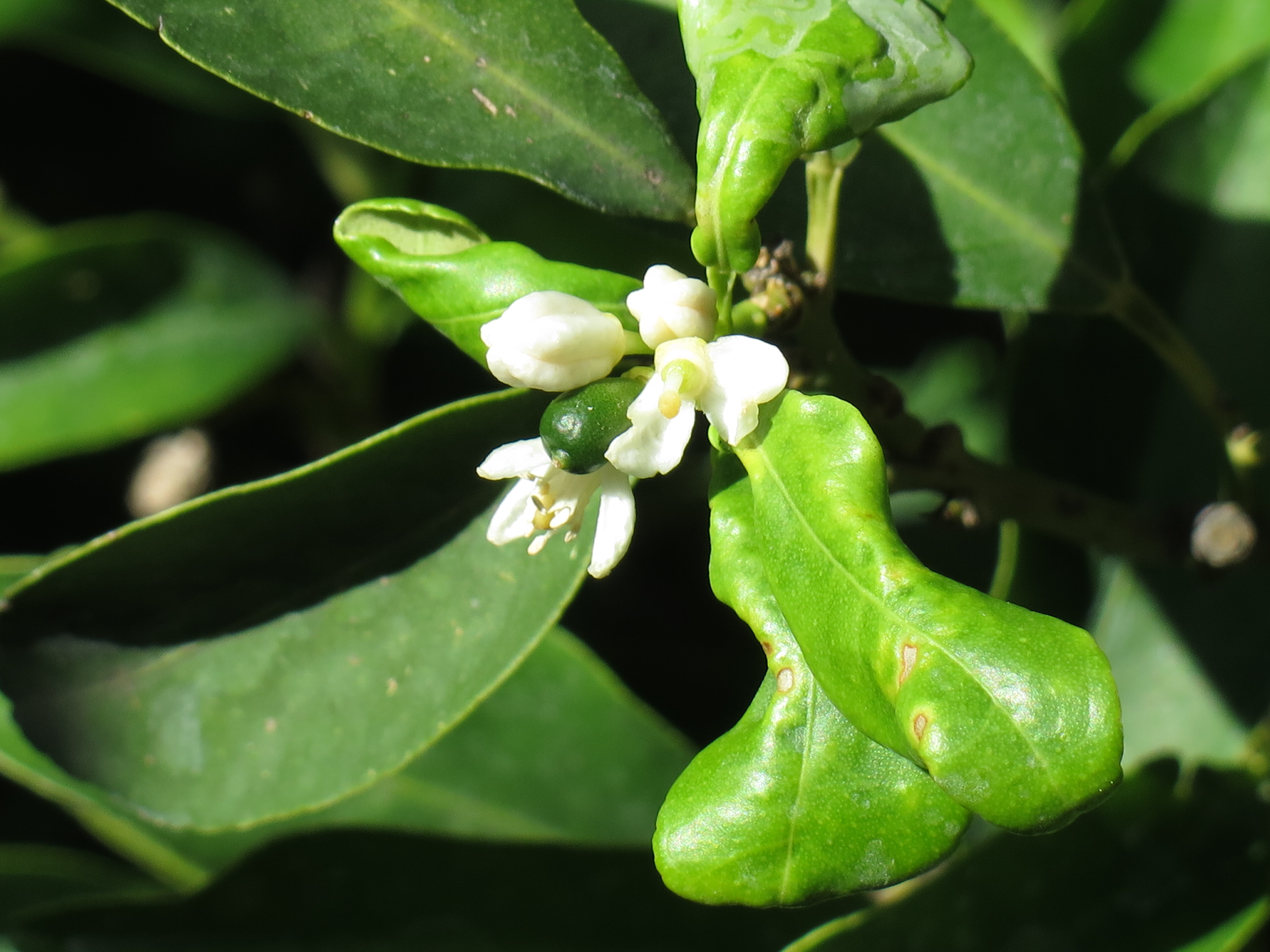
Flowers and fruit

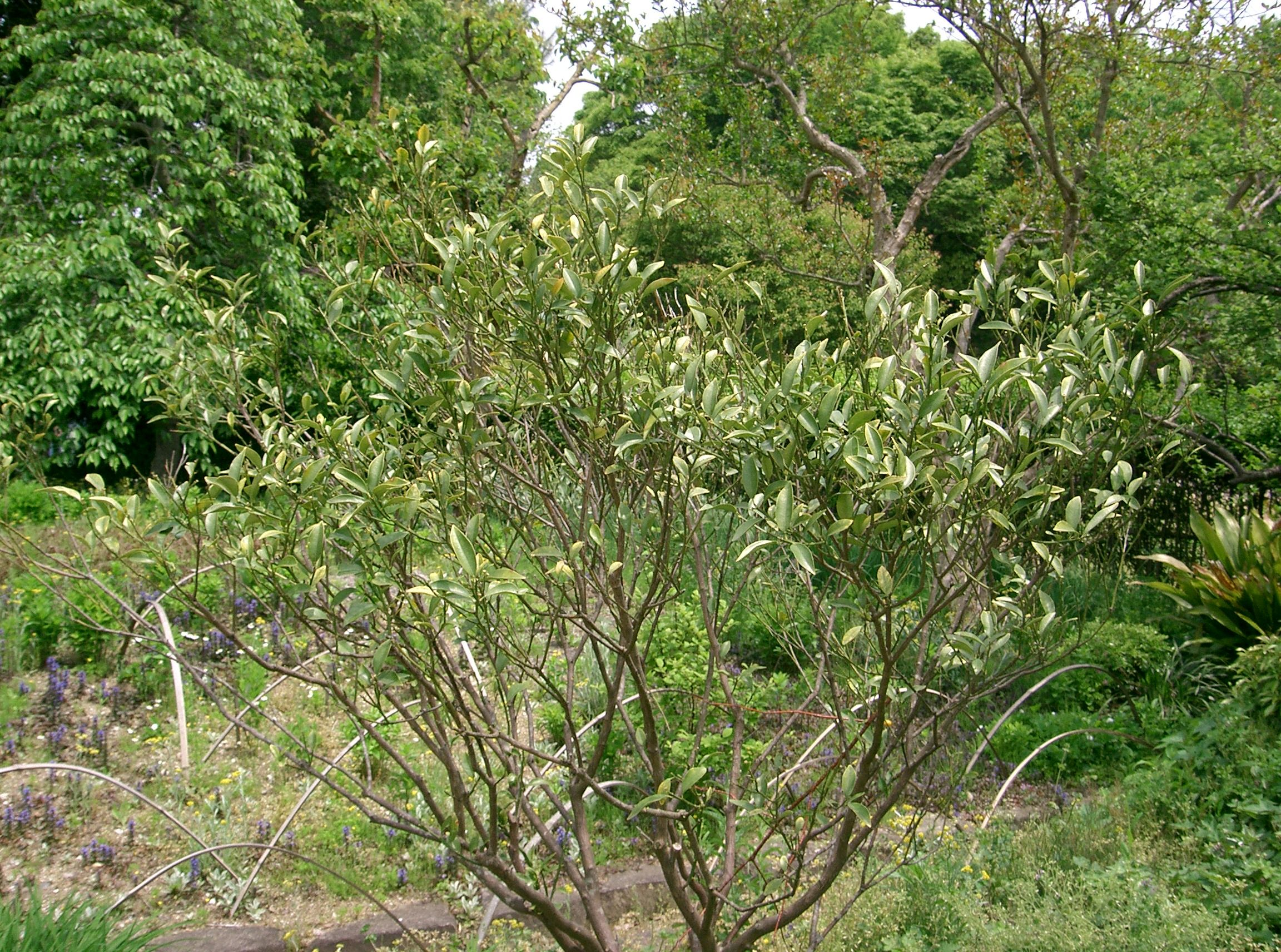
Kumquat tree

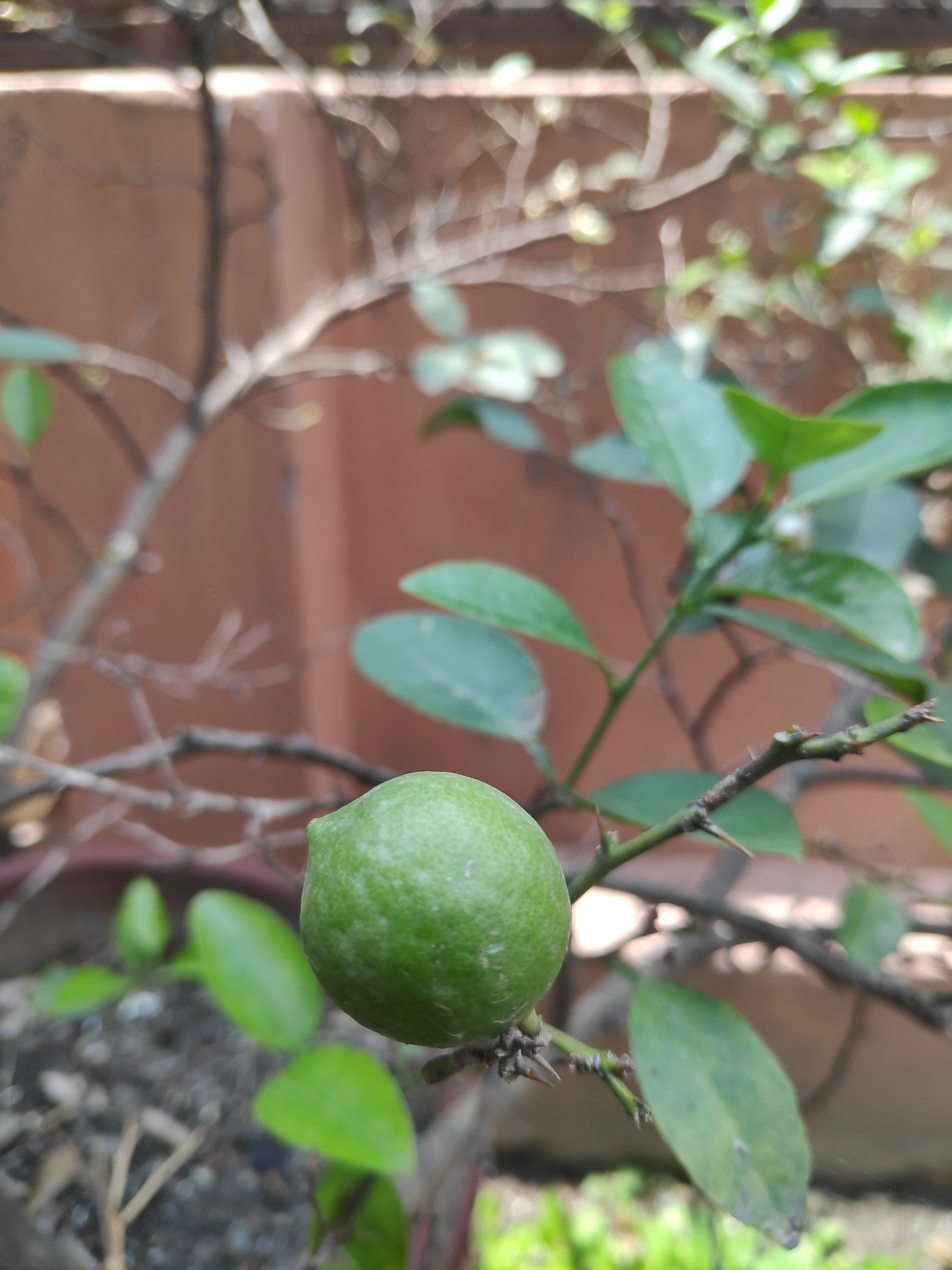
Unripe kumquat

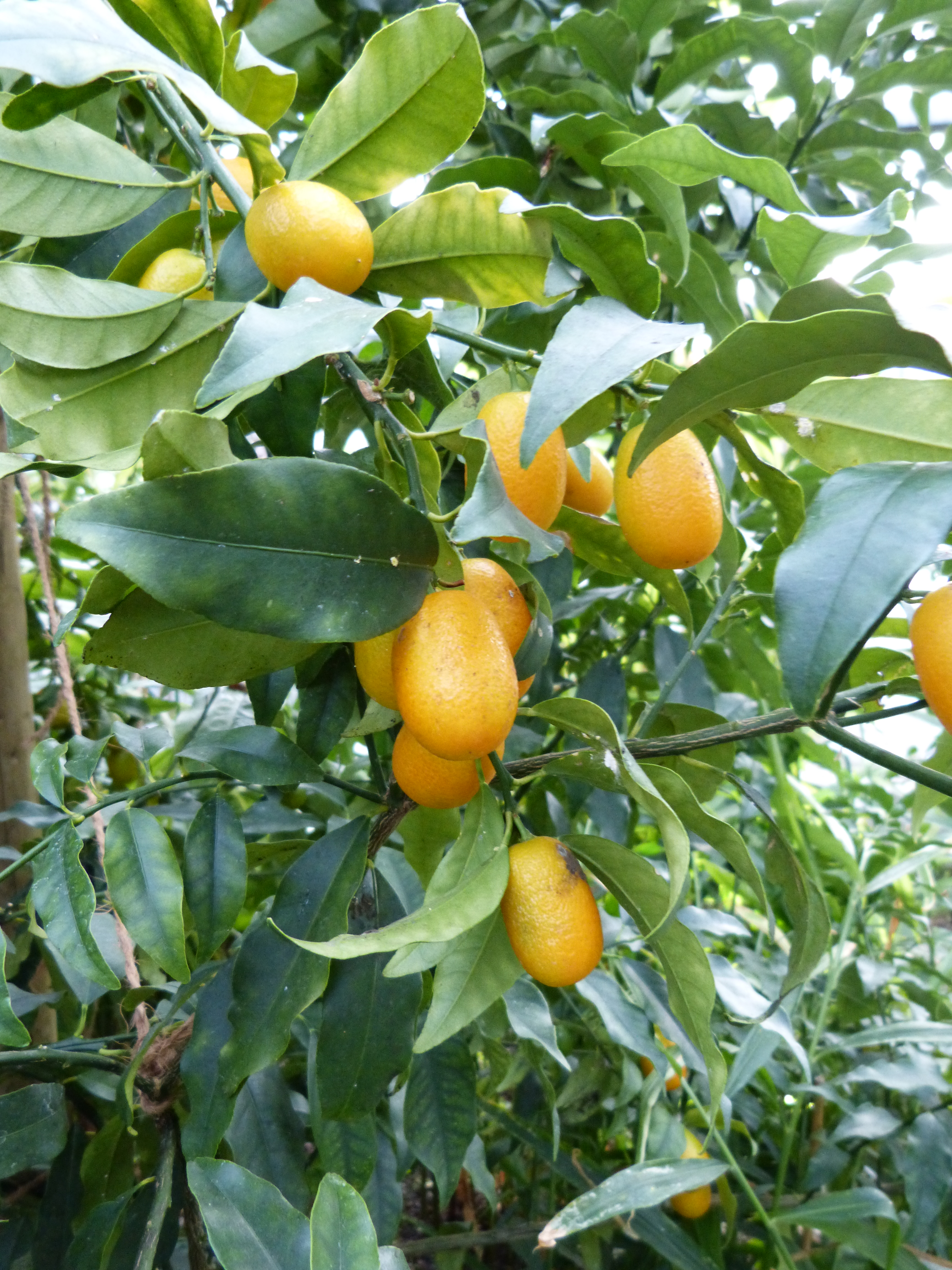
Ripened kumquat

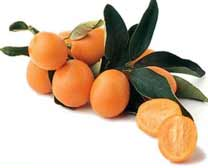
Kumquat

== See also ==
- Kumquat Festival
- Sunquat
- Limequat
- Citrofortunella
- Calamansi
- Yuzuquat
