= Kumquat Festival =

Annual celebration in Dade City, Florida

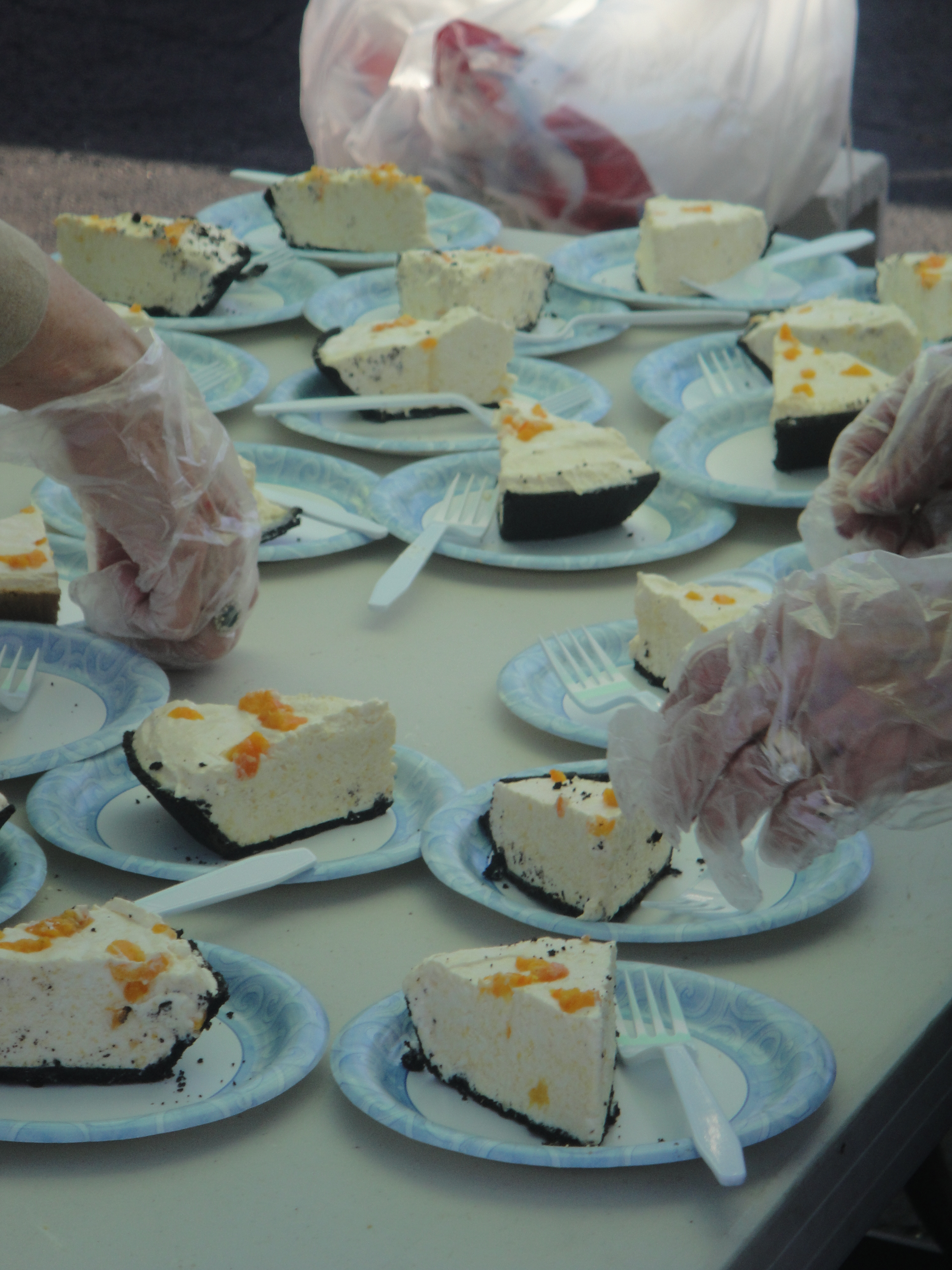
Slices of kumquat pie at the festival

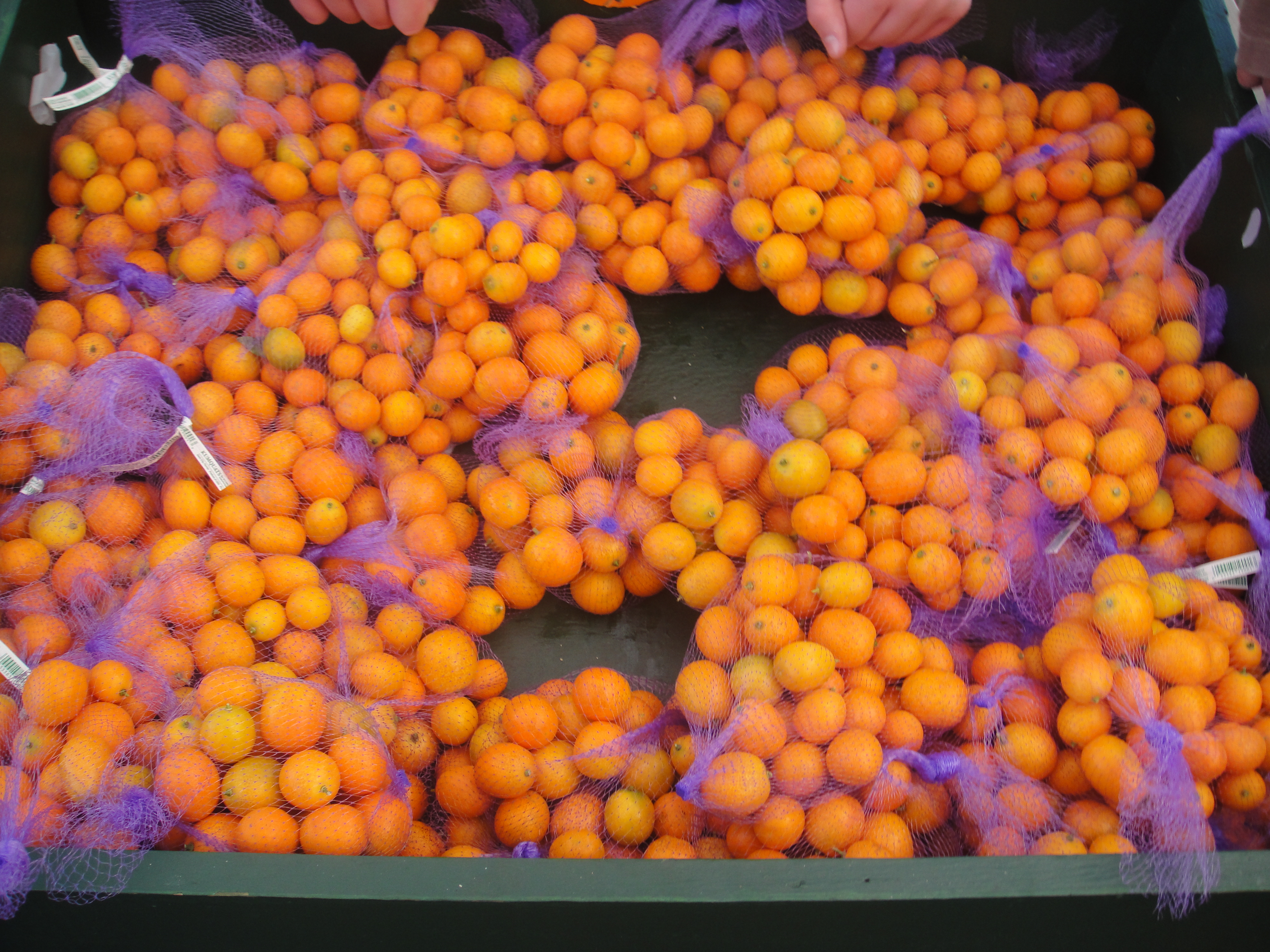
Bags of kumquat for sale at the festival

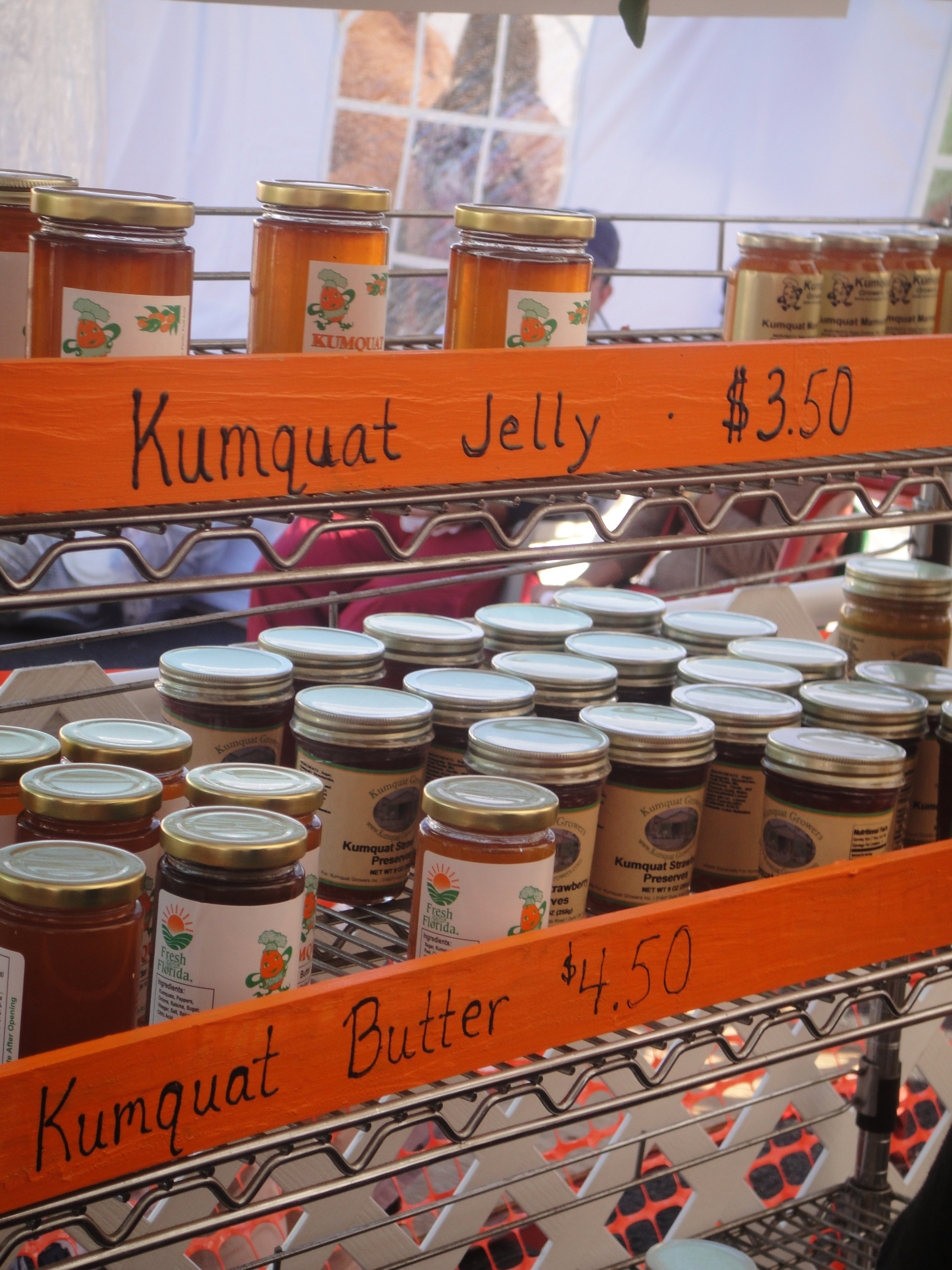
Shelves of kumquat jelly and kumquat butter at the 2011 festival

The Kumquat Festival is an annual celebration held each January in downtown Dade City, Florida focused on the kumquat—a small, tart citrus fruit traditionally consumed whole, including its sweet, edible peel. Organized by the East Pasco Chamber of Commerce, the festival has become a renowned event, marking its 28th year in 2025 and continuing to attract tens of thousands of visitors time and again.

The event showcases a wide variety of kumquat-themed comestibles, most notably kumquat pie, a Pasco County specialty that has become emblematic of the festival itself.

The kumquat crop, however, remains vulnerable to environmental threats, particularly freezing temperatures, which can significantly impact yield and availability.

Located just west of Dade City, the community of St. Joseph is often hailed as the "Kumquat Capital of the World", a title prominently featured in festival brochures.
