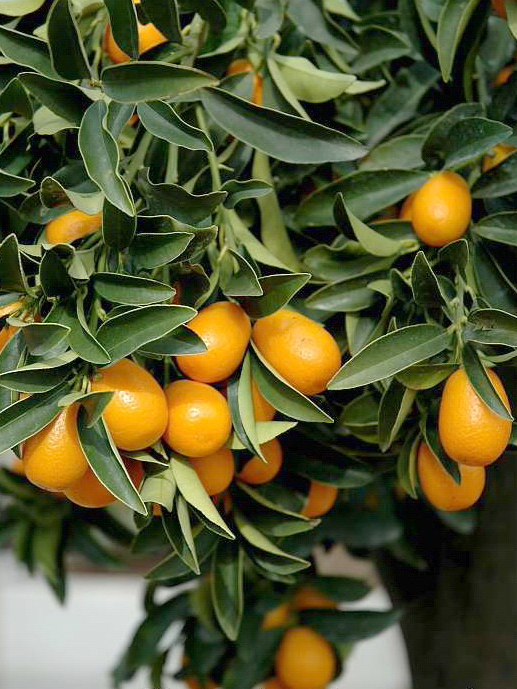
- Fruit

Scientific classification
- Kingdom: Plantae
- Clade: Embryophytes
- Clade: Tracheophytes
- Clade: Spermatophytes
- Clade: Angiosperms
- Clade: Eudicots
- Clade: Rosids
- Order: Sapindales
- Family: Rutaceae
- Genus: Citrus
- Species: C. margarita

Binomial name
- Citrus margarita (Lour.) Swingle, 1915

Synonyms
- Fortunella margarita

= Citrus margarita =

Species of kumquat

Citrus margarita, the oval kumquat or Nagami kumquat, is a species of kumquat; a type of citrus fruit in the genus Citrus, family Rutaceae. Its epithet, margarita, is Latin for pearly.

It is first described by the Portuguese botanist João de Loureiro in 1790, in his Flora cochinchinensis under the name Citrus margarita. It is described again by the American botanist Walter Tennyson Swingle in 1915, as varieties of Citrus japonica. However, recent phylogenetic analysis suggested that C. margarita is a single 'true' species.

== Description ==
C. margarita grows 8–12 ft (2.4–3.7 m) tall. The branches have few, to no spines.

It has simple, alternate leaves, which are dark green above, and pale below and have a leathery texture. They are lanceolate (narrow) with an obtuse tip. They grow to up to 10 cm (3.9 in) long, and 3–4.5 cm (1.2–1.8 in) wide. The axillary flowers are white with 5 sepals and 5 petals and 16–20 stamens. They can be single or in clusters, and have persistent styles, and deep seated oil glands. The ovaries are made of 4–5 cells. The peduncles are 3–5 millimetres (0.12–0.20 in). The clavate stigma is hollow and enlarged at the top.

The fruits of C. margarita are oblong, measuring 3 cm × 4 cm (1.2 in × 1.6 in), and have orange peels and flesh. They mature in late winter and have 4–5 segments each. The peel is 2 mm (0.079 in) and sweet, with conspicuous oil cells. The flesh is sour, with spindle-shaped juice vesicles. Each fruit has 2-5 green monoembryonic seeds that need to be removed before consumption. Its cotyledons are light green.

== Distribution and habitat ==
C. margarita is native to southeast China. It is cultivated in Central and South America, Sicily, Ethiopia, Zimbabwe, Hawaii and Malaysia. It was introduced to Florida in 1885 from Japan, where it became the most commonly cultivated variety of kumquat. It does best in temperatures of 25–30 °C (77–86 °F) in the summer, and is frost-tolerant, withstanding temperatures as low as −8 °C (18 °F). It prefers full sun, however it can tolerate light shade. It does poorly in soils that are water-logged or rich with calcium carbonate, preferring well-drained soils with a pH of 6–6.5.

== Ecology ==
C. margarita are relatively cold-hardy, due to their ability to become semi-dormant between late fall and early spring. It flowers in the summer, and its fruits mature in late winter.

== Cultivation ==
Occasionally, the oval kumquat is grafted on the calamondin.

== Use ==
The fruits of C. margarita can be eaten fresh, pickled, preserved in syrup or made into jam. If macerated in vodka or another clear spirit, they can be made into liqueur. They are often added to hot or iced tea in the Philippines. The tree is often planted as an ornamental tree.

== Gallery ==
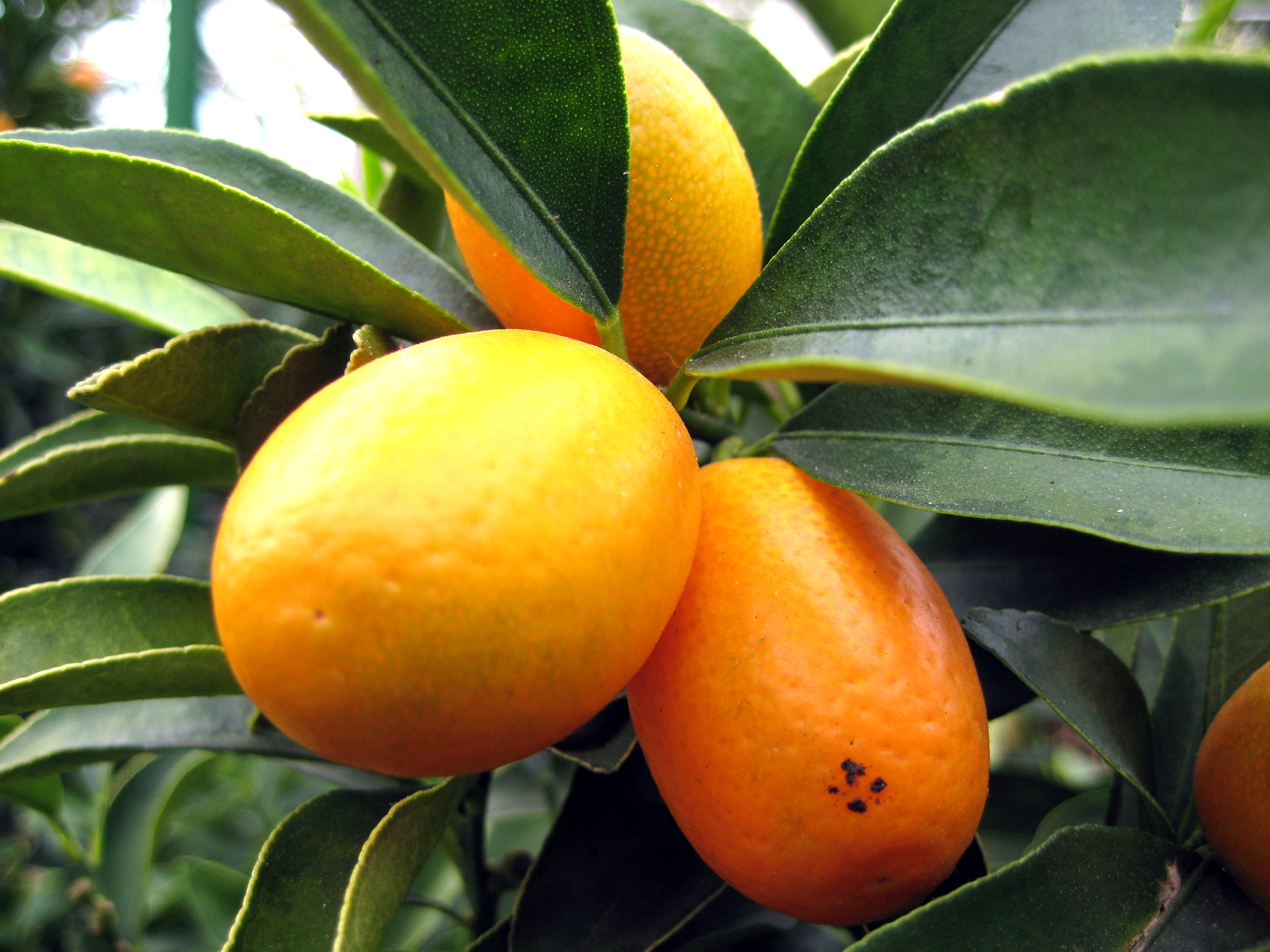

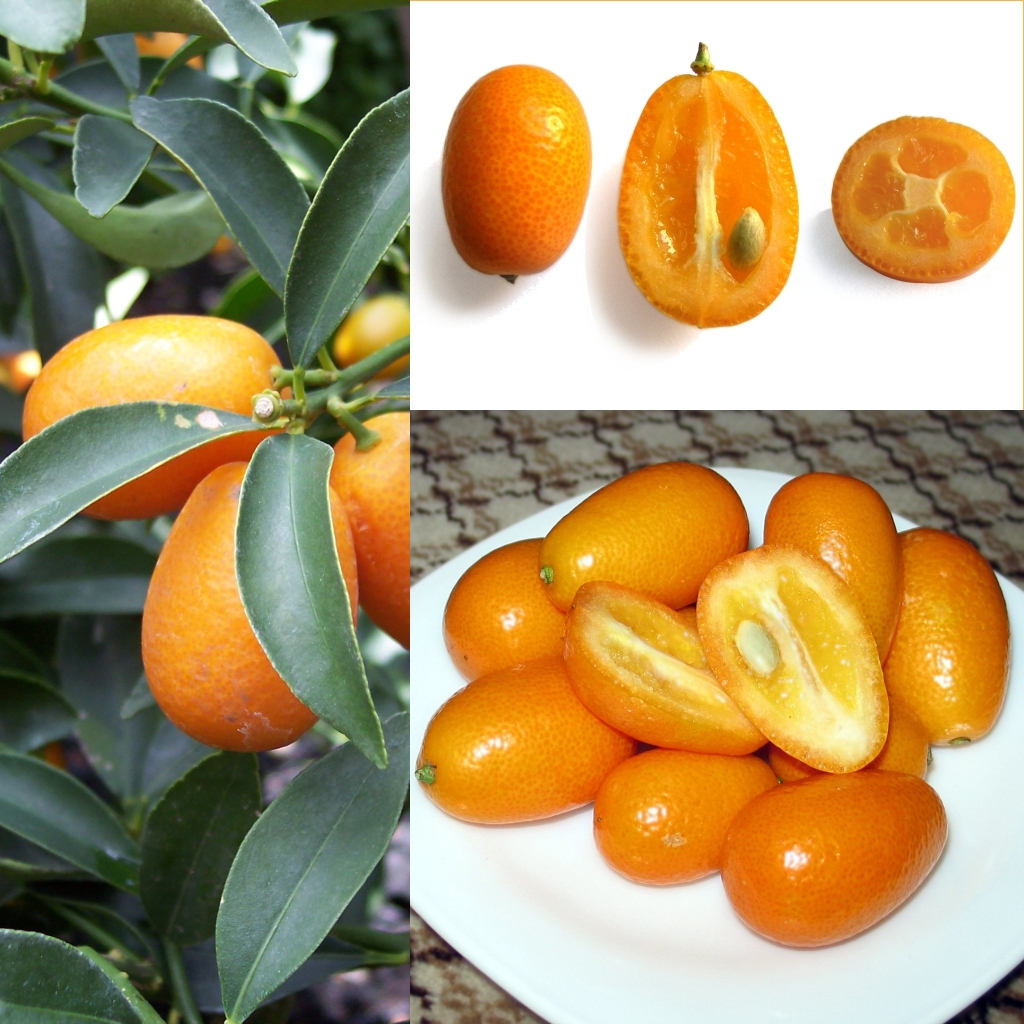

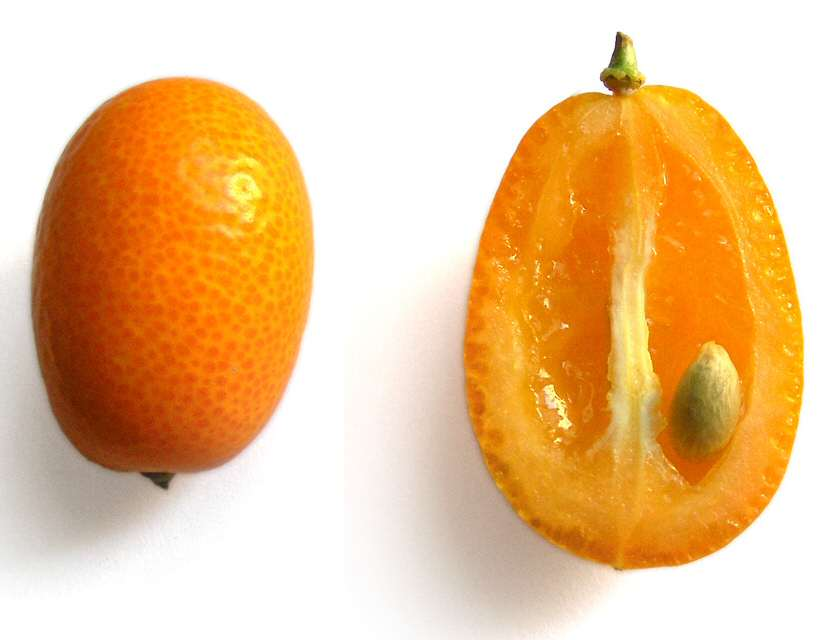

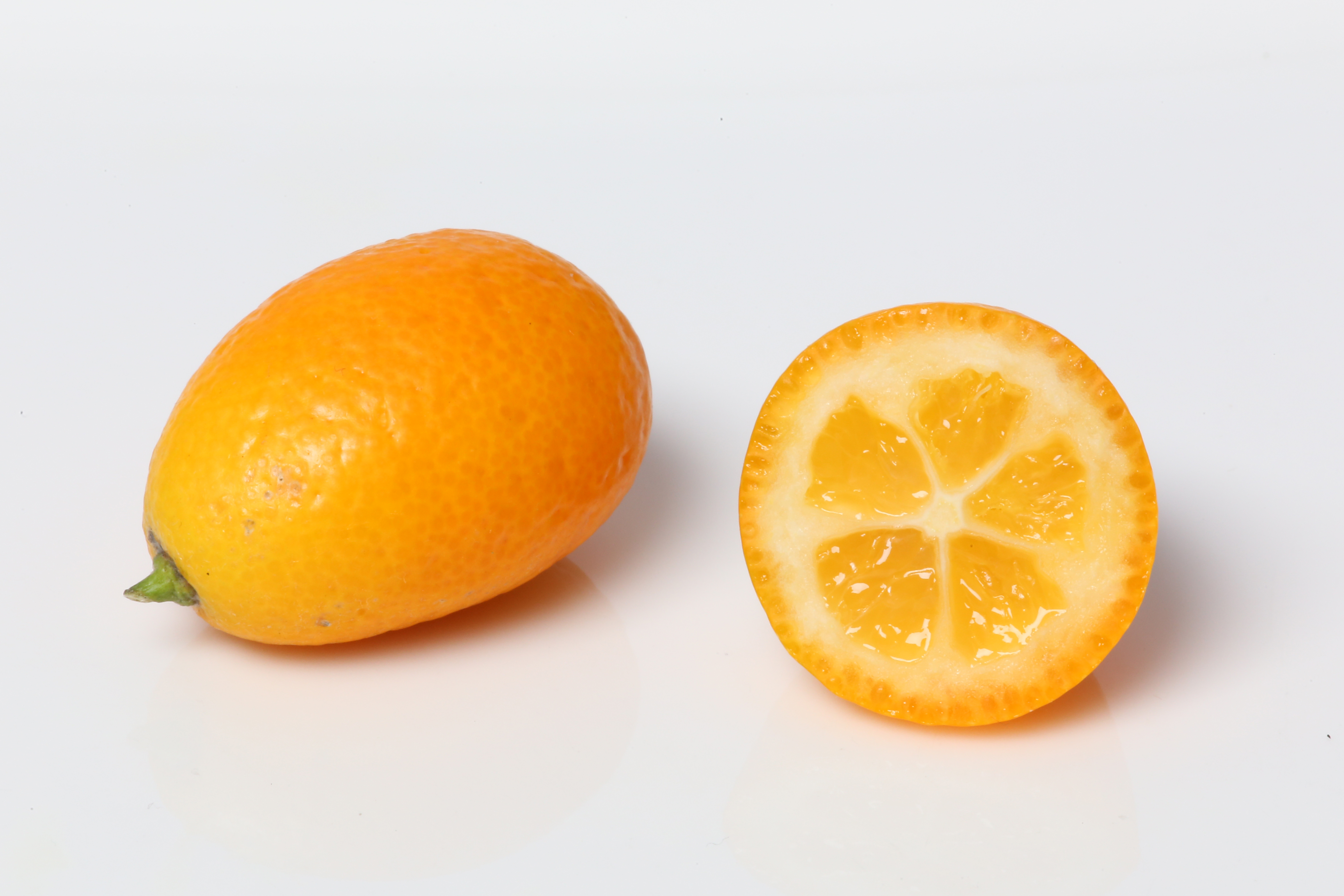
