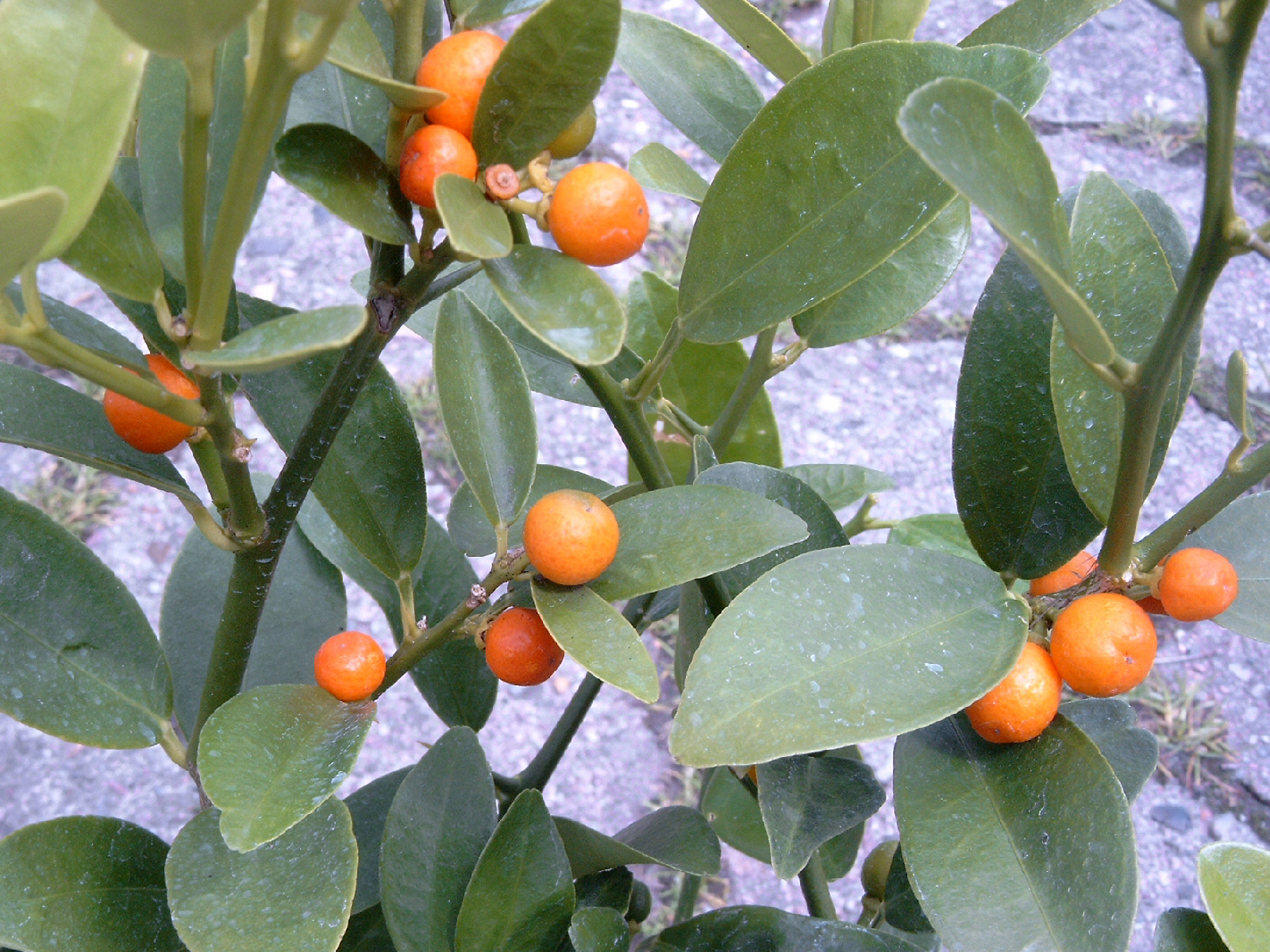
- Fruit

Scientific classification
- Kingdom: Plantae
- Clade: Embryophytes
- Clade: Tracheophytes
- Clade: Spermatophytes
- Clade: Angiosperms
- Clade: Eudicots
- Clade: Rosids
- Order: Sapindales
- Family: Rutaceae
- Genus: Citrus
- Species: C. hindsii

Binomial name
- Citrus hindsii (Champ. ex Benth.) Govaerts, 1999

= Citrus hindsii =

Species of flowering plant

Citrus hindsii, the Hong Kong kumquat, is a species of kumquat; a type of citrus fruit in the genus Citrus, family Rutaceae. This specific name is first published in World Checklist of Seed Plants 3(1): 15 (1999). Recent phylogenetic analysis suggested that C. hindsii is a single 'true' species.

Citrus hindsii produces small, round, pea-sized, bitter and acidic fruit with very little pulp and large seeds. The fruits are bright orange in color when ripe. In warmer regions, it is primarily grown as an ornamental plant as well as houseplant and bonsai. Though it is also found in southern China growing in the wild. Not only is it the most primitive of the kumquats, but with kumquats being the most primitive citrus, Swingle described it as the closest to the ancestral species from which all citrus evolved. While the wild Hong Kong kumquat is tetraploid, there is a commercial diploid variety, the Golden Bean kumquat, with slightly larger fruit.

== Synonyms ==
- Fortunella hindsii (Champ. ex Benth.) Swingle, 1915.
- Sclerostylis hindsii Champ. ex Benth.
- Atalantia hindsii (Champ. ex Benth.) Oliv.
