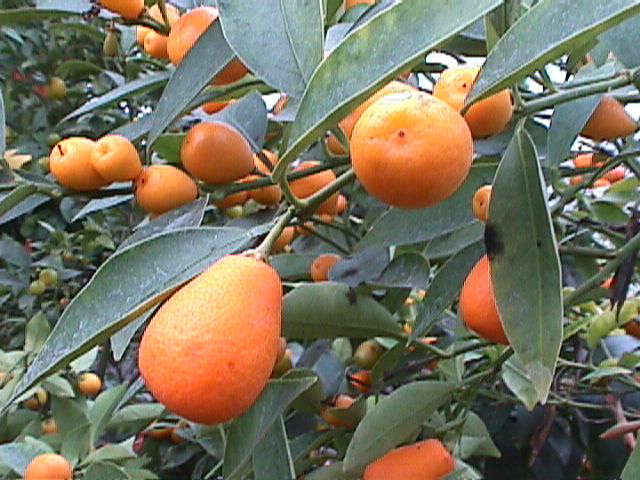
- Fruit

Scientific classification
- Kingdom: Plantae
- Clade: Embryophytes
- Clade: Tracheophytes
- Clade: Spermatophytes
- Clade: Angiosperms
- Clade: Eudicots
- Clade: Rosids
- Order: Sapindales
- Family: Rutaceae
- Genus: Citrus
- Species: C. swinglei

Binomial name
- Citrus swinglei Burkill ex Harms, 1931

Synonyms
- List: Atalantia polyandra Ridl. in Fl. Malay Penins. 5: 295 (1925); Citrus polyandra (Ridl.) Burkill in Gard. Bull. Straits Settlem. 5: 219 (1931), nom. illeg.; Fortunella polyandra (Ridl.) Yu.Tanaka in Stud. Citrol. 5: 143 (1932); Fortunella swinglei Tanaka in Bull. Soc. Bot. France 75: 714 (1928)

= Citrus swinglei =

Species of kumquat

Citrus swinglei, the Malayan kumquat, is a species of kumquat; a type of citrus fruit in the genus Citrus, family Rutaceae. It was first described by Burkill ex Harms in 1931.

Citrus swinglei, from the Malay Peninsula where it is known as the "hedge lime" (limau pagar), had type E chromosomes. It has a thin peel on larger fruit compared to any other kumquats.

== Synonyms ==
- Atalantia polyandra
- Citrus polyandra
- Fortunella polyandra
- Fortunella swinglei
