= Maude Kellerman =

American botanist (1888-1992)

Maude Kellerman Swingle (1888–1992) was an American botanist who co-authored works with her husband the botanist Walter Tennyson Swingle. She was educated at the Ohio State University and worked as a librarian at the United States Department of Agriculture. The standard author abbreviation M.Kellerm. is used to indicate this person as the author when citing a botanical name.
