= Sunquat =

Citrus fruit and plant

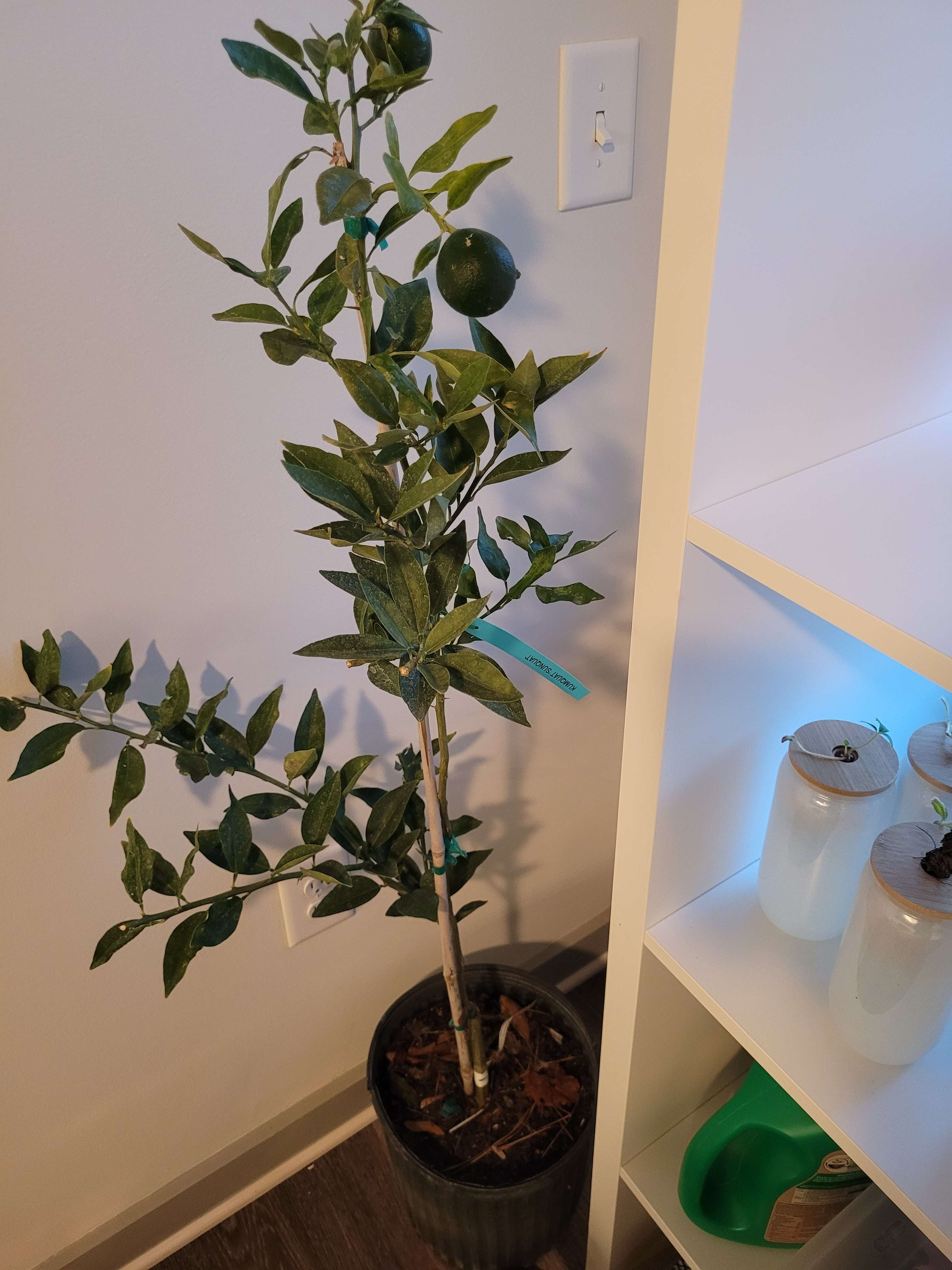
A Sunquat sapling

A sunquat, also known as lemonquat or lemondrop, is a variety of citrus fruit, having an edible rind.

It was initially created by Leslie Cude in Beeville, Texas, as a chance hybrid between a lemon (likely a 'Meyer') and a kumquat. The fruit is often sliced thin, having a somewhat tart flavor.
