= Yuzuquat =

Hybrid lemon and kumquat

A yuzuquat is a trigeneric hybrid between a Yuzu lemon (Citrus ichangensis x C. reticulata) and 'Nagami' kumquat (C. japonica 'Nagami'). It was developed by John Brown in Texas. The fruit often is used as a lemon substitute and is very seedy.
