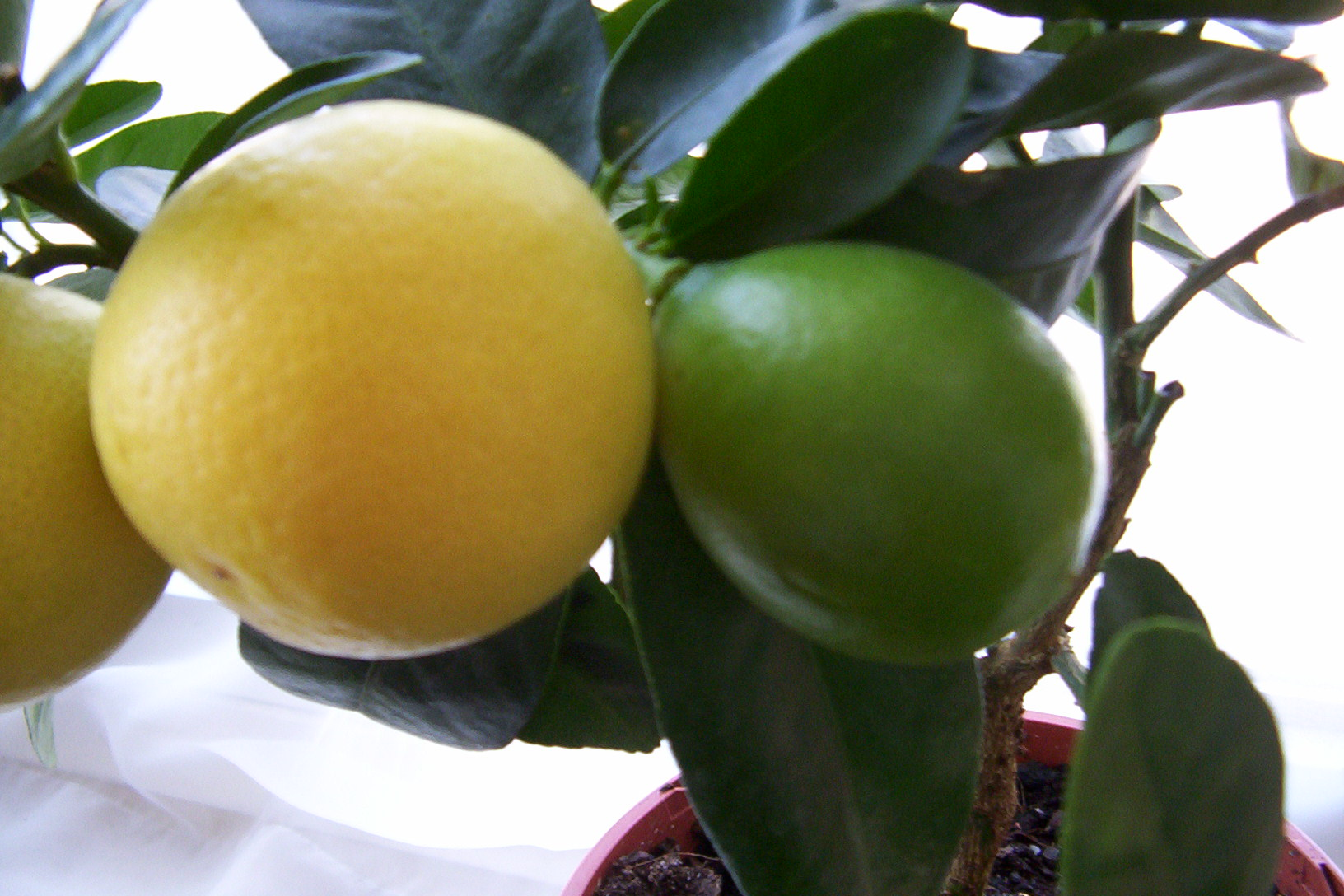
- A Eustis Limequat

Scientific classification
- Kingdom: Plantae
- Clade: Tracheophytes
- Clade: Angiosperms
- Clade: Eudicots
- Clade: Rosids
- Order: Sapindales
- Family: Rutaceae
- Genus: Citrus
- Species: C. × floridana

Binomial name
- Citrus × floridana (J. Ingram & H. Moore) Mabb.

= Limequat =

Hybrid variety of citrus tree and fruit

The limequat (Citrus × floridana) is a citrus hybrid that is the result of a cross between the Key lime and the kumquat, hybridized by Walter Tennyson Swingle in 1909.

== Description ==
It is a small tree that grows into a contained bushy form. The leaves are characteristically citrus-like. The limequat produces an abundance of fruit even at a young age. The fruit is small, oval, greenish-yellow and contains seeds or pips. It has a sweet-tasting skin and a bitter-sweet pulp with a flavor similar to limes. The fruit can be eaten whole or the juice and rind can be used to flavor drinks and dishes. It has considerable amounts of vitamin C and is highly acidic.

This plant is now grown in Japan, Israel, Spain, Malaysia, South Africa, the United Kingdom and the United States in California, Arizona, Florida, and Texas. The fruit can be found, in small quantities, during the fall and winter months in the United States, India and Japan.

Limequats can be grown indoors or outdoors providing the temperature stays between 10 and 30 °C (50 and 86 °F). They are fairly small and can be planted in containers or pots, in well-drained fertile soil. Plants grow fairly slowly and flower and fruit for 5–7 months, then rest for 5–7 months.

Limequats are more cold-hardy than limes but less cold-hardy than kumquats.

Limequats are used in cocktails and fruit salads, and can be candied whole. They can be cooked if the seeds are removed, as they impart a bitter taste, and they can also be made into conserves.

== Varieties ==
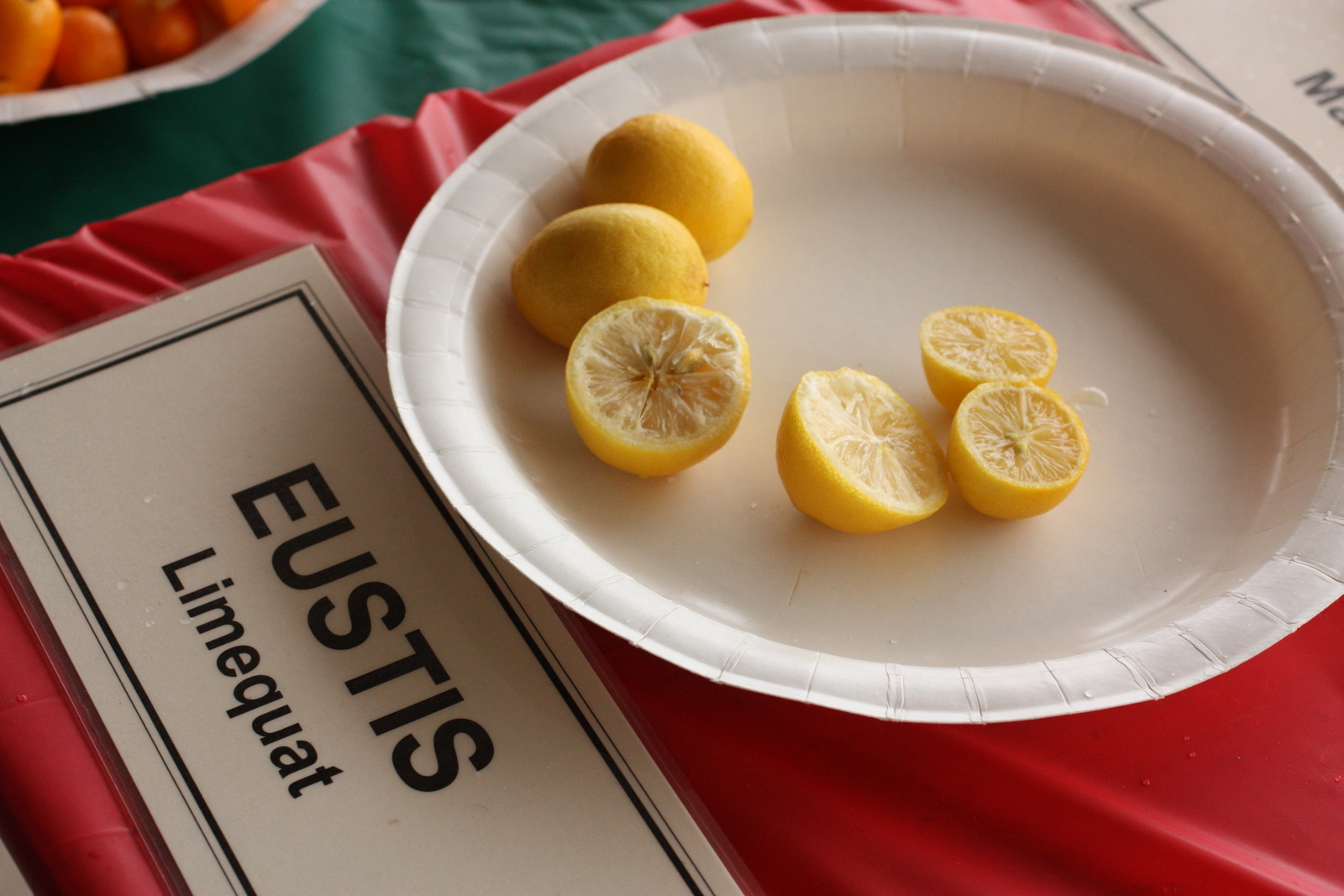
Eustis Limequat

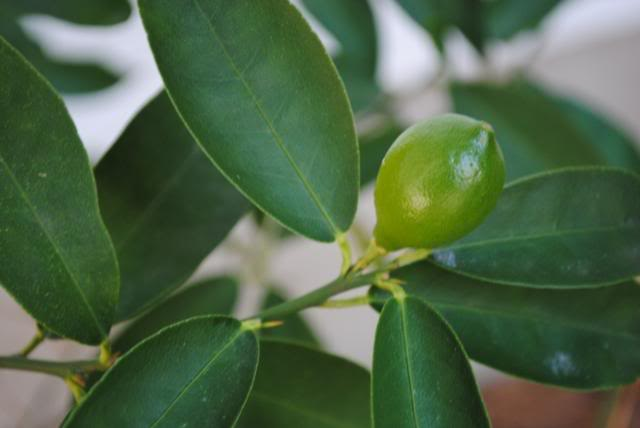
Lakeland Limequat

There are three different named cultivars of limequats:

- Eustis (Citrus japonica (synonym Fortunella japonica) × Citrus aurantiifolia) – Key lime crossed with round kumquat, the most common limequat. It was named after the city of Eustis, Florida.
- Lakeland (Citrus japonica × Citrus aurantiifolia) – Key lime crossed with round kumquat, different seed from same hybrid parent as Eustis. Fruit is slightly larger and contains a few fewer seeds than Eustis. It was named after the city of Lakeland, Florida.
- Tavares (Citrus japonica 'Margarita' × Citrus aurantiifolia) – Key lime crossed with oval kumquat. Fruit is larger and more elongated and color at maturity is more orange than other limequats. It was named after the city of Tavares, Florida.
