= Walter Tennyson Swingle =

American agricultural botanist

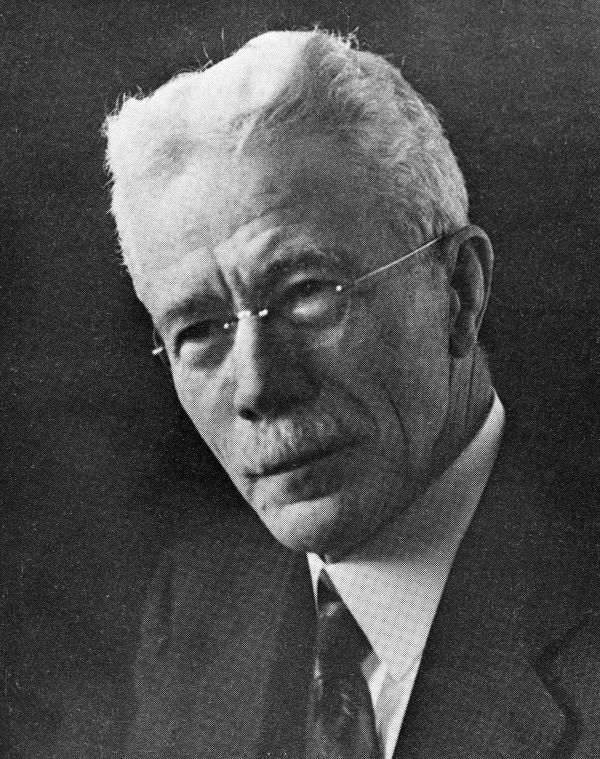
- Born: January 8, 1871; Canaan, Pennsylvania
- Died: January 19, 1952 (aged 81); Washington, D.C.
- Education: Kansas State Agricultural College, University of Bonn
- Known for: Citrus taxonomy (Swingle system)
- Spouse(s): Lucie Romstaedt, Maude Kellerman
- Children: 4
- Scientific career
- Workplaces: USDA
- Author abbrev. (botany): Swingle

Walter Tennyson Swingle (January 8, 1871 – January 19, 1952) was an American agricultural botanist who contributed greatly to the classification and taxonomy of citrus.

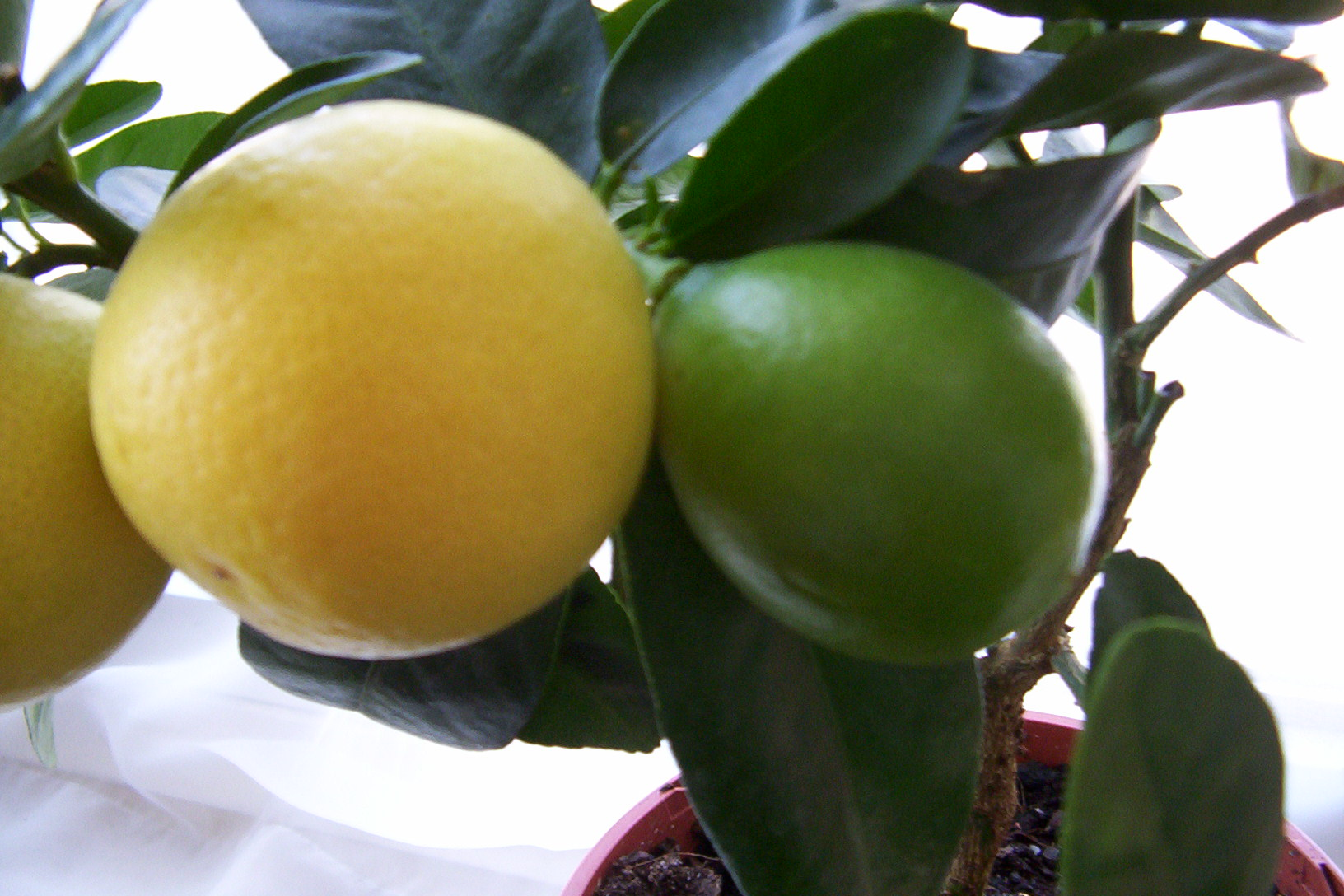
Limequat, a citrofortunella hybrid created by Swingle

== Biography ==
Swingle was born in Canaan, Pennsylvania, and moved with his family to Kansas two years later.

He graduated from the Kansas State Agricultural College in 1890, and studied at the University of Bonn in 1895–96 and 1898. With William Ashbrook Kellerman he edited the exsiccata Kansas fungi (1889), a specimen series which is widely distributed in major herbaria.

Swingle married Lucie Romstaedt in 1901; she died in 1910. He married Maude Kellerman, daughter of William Ashbrook Kellerman, in 1915 and they had four children. He died in Washington, D.C., on January 19, 1952.

In 1927, botanist Elmer Drew Merrill published Swinglea, which is a genus of flowering plants from the Philippines, belonging to the family Rutaceae and named in Walter Tennyson Swingle's honor.

== Contribution to US agricultural industry ==
Swingle worked at the United States Department of Agriculture (1891), investigated subtropic fruits, established laboratories in Florida, became an agricultural explorer, and (after 1902) had charge of crop physiology and breeding investigations. He developed the tangelo citrus hybrid in 1897 in Eustis, Florida.

He made several visits to the Mediterranean countries of Europe, to North Africa, and to Asia Minor, from where he introduced the date palm, pistachio nut and other useful plants, as well as the fig wasp, to make possible the cultivation of Smyrna figs in California.

Swingle also traveled to Asia, bringing back 100,000 Chinese volumes on botany to the Library of Congress.

Much of his research is published in the five-volume book, The Citrus Industry, of which he wrote a significant portion.

== Plant anatomy collection ==
An extensive collection related to Swingle and his life, photos and works entitled the "Swingle Plant Anatomy Reference Collection" is hosted at the University of Miami.

== Selected publications ==
- The grain smuts: how they are caused and how to prevent them. Farmers' bulletin / United States Department of Agriculture; no. 75. U.S. Dept. of Agriculture. 1898.
- Swingle, Walter T. (1899). "Diœcism of the fig in its bearing upon caprification". Science. 10 (251): 570–574. Bibcode:1899Sci....10..570S. doi:10.1126/science.10.251.570. PMID 17734391.
- The date palm and its utilization in the southwestern states. United States. Dept. Of agriculture. Bureau of plant industry. Bulletin; no. 53. Govt. print. off. 1904.
- Citrus ichangensis, a promising, hardy, new species from southwestern China and Assam. 1913.
- Citropsis, a new tropical African genus allied to Citrus. 1914.
- Eremocitrus. 1914.
- Chronologic list of the dissertations of Charles Linnaeus 1743 to 1776. 1923.
- New citrus hybrids. 1931.
- Quarantine procedure to safeguard the introduction of citrus plants : a system of aseptic plant propagation.
- The Citrus Industry. University of California Press. 1943–1948.
