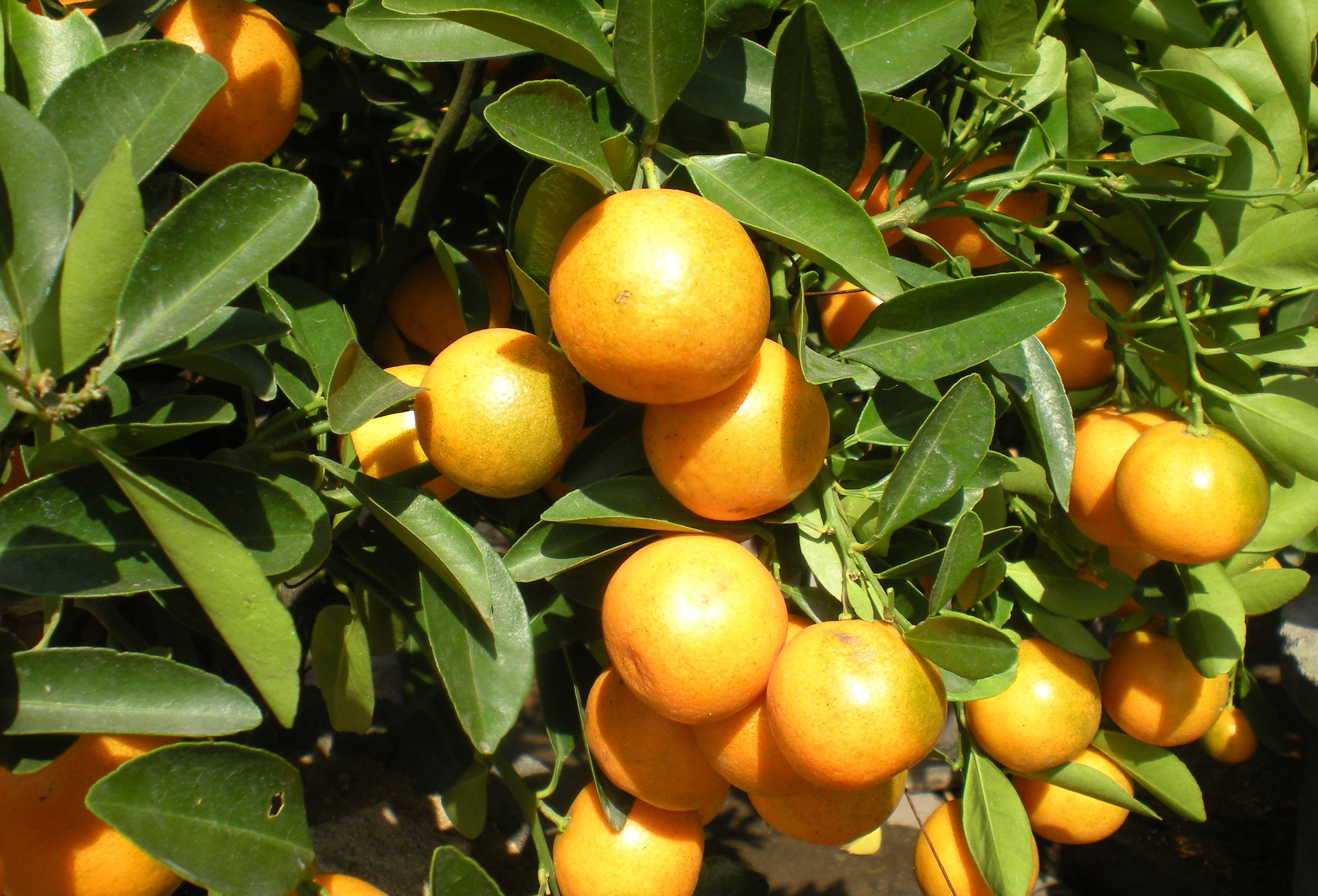
- Fruit

Scientific classification
- Kingdom: Plantae
- Clade: Embryophytes
- Clade: Tracheophytes
- Clade: Angiosperms
- Clade: Eudicots
- Clade: Rosids
- Order: Sapindales
- Family: Rutaceae
- Genus: Citrus
- Species: C. japonica

Binomial name
- Citrus japonica Thunb., 1780

Synonyms
- List: Atalantia hindsii (Champ. ex Benth.) Oliv.; Citrofortunella madurensis (Lour.) D.Rivera & al.; Citrus aurantium var. globifera Engl.; Citrus erythrocarpa Hayata; Citrus hindsii (Champ. ex Benth.) Govaerts; Citrus inermis Roxb.; Citrus japonica var. fructu-elliptica Siebold & Zucc.; Citrus japonica var. madurensis (Lour.) Guillaumin; Citrus japonica Thunb.; Citrus kinokuni Yu.Tanaka; Citrus madurensis Lour.; Citrus nobilis var. inermis (Roxb.) Sagot; Citrus × aurantium subvar. madurensis (Lour.) Engl.; Citrus (Thunb.) Hook. f.; Fortunella bawangica C.C.Huang; Fortunella chintou (Swingle) C.C. Huang; Fortunella hindsii (Champ. ex Benth.) Swingle; Fortunella japonica (Thunb.) Swingle (préféré par GRIN); Fortunella japonica (Thunb.) Swingle; Fortunella margarita (Lour.) Swingle; Fortunella obovata Tanaka; Fortunella venosa (Champ. ex Benth.) C. C. Huang; Limonia monophylla Lour.; Sclerostylis hindsii Champ. ex Benth.; Sclerostylis venosa Champ. ex Benth.; Sclerostylis vensoa Champ. ex Benth.; × Citrofortunella madurensis (Lour.) D. Rivera & al.

= Citrus japonica =

Species of plant

Citrus japonica, the round kumquat, Marumi kumquat, or Morgani kumquat, is a species of citrus fruit in the genus Citrus. It was first described by Carl Peter Thunberg in 1780 as Fortunella japonica.

Citrus japonica is a native species in southern China.

== See also ==
- Kumquat
