= Citrus taxonomy =

Botanical classification of the genus Citrus

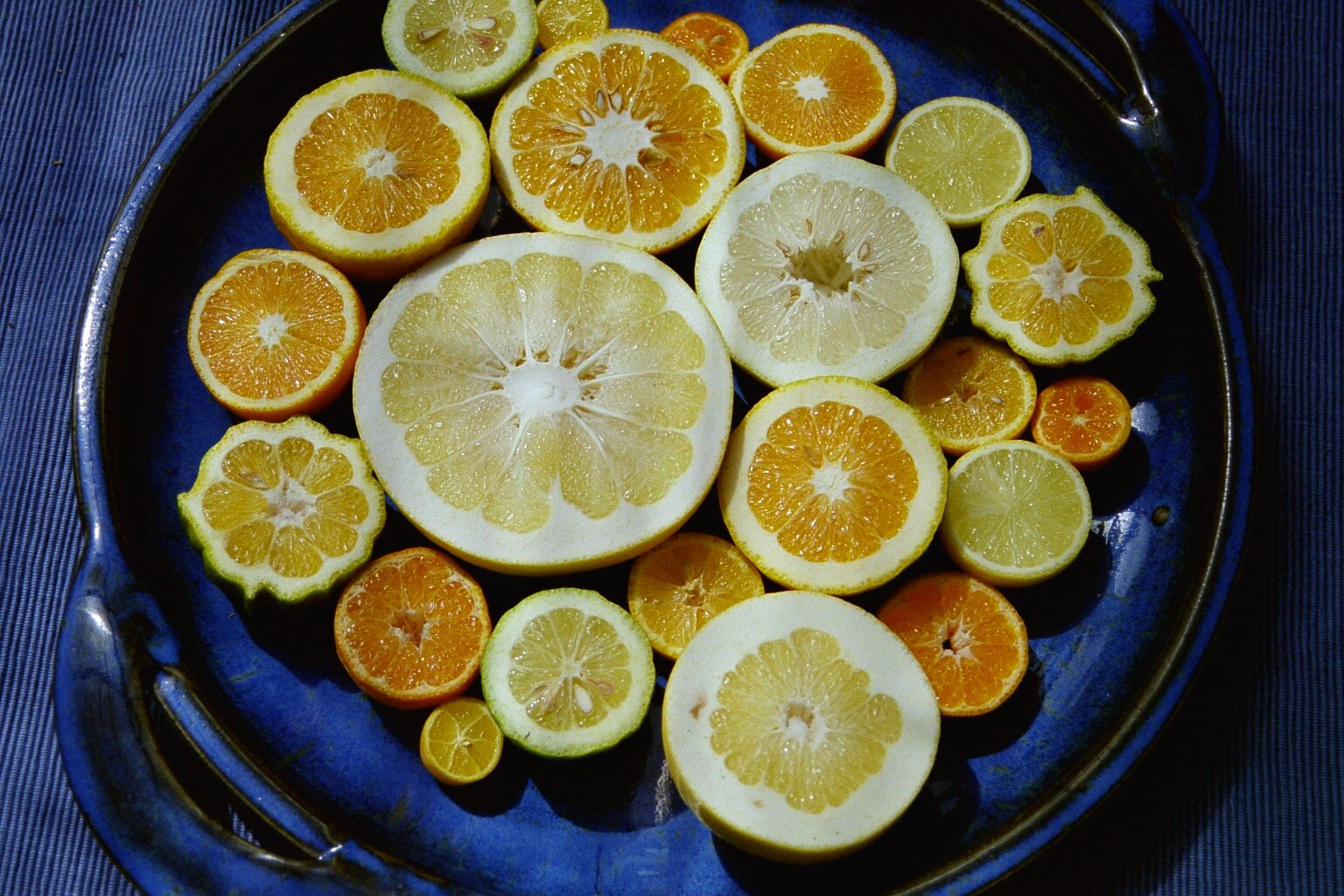
Various citrus types in cross section. Some of them are hybrids between two or more original species.

The taxonomy of the species, varieties, cultivars, and graft hybrids within the genus Citrus and related genera is complex and controversial. Cultivated citrus are derived from various citrus species found in the wild. Some are only selections of the original wild types, many others are hybrids between two or more original species, and some are backcrossed hybrids between a hybrid and one of the hybrid's parent species. Citrus plants hybridize easily between species with completely different morphologies, and similar-looking citrus fruits may have quite different ancestries. Some differ only in disease resistance. Conversely, different-looking varieties may be nearly genetically identical, and differ only by a bud mutation.

Genomic analysis of wild and domesticated citrus cultivars has suggested that the progenitor of modern citrus species expanded out of the Himalayan foothills in a rapid radiation that has produced at least 11 wild species in South and East Asia and Australia, with more than a half-dozen additional candidates for which either insufficient characterization prevents definitive species designation, or there is a lack of consensus for their placement within the Citrus genus rather than sister genera. Most commercial cultivars are the product of hybridization among these wild species, with most coming from crosses involving citrons, mandarins and pomelos. Many different phylogenies for the non-hybrid citrus have been proposed, and the phylogeny based on their nuclear genome does not match that derived from their chloroplast DNA, probably a consequence of the rapid initial divergence. Taxonomic terminology is not yet settled.

Most hybrids express different ancestral traits when planted from seeds (F2 hybrids) and can continue a stable lineage only through vegetative propagation. Some hybrids do reproduce true to type via nucellar seeds in a process called apomixis. As such, many hybrid species represent the clonal progeny of a single original F1 cross, though others combine fruit with similar characteristics that have arisen from distinct crosses.

== Genetic history ==
All of the wild 'pure' citrus species trace to a common ancestor that lived in the Himalayan foothills, where a late-Miocene citrus fossil, Citrus linczangensis, has been found. At that time (about 12–5 million years ago), a lessening of the monsoons and resultant drier climate in the region allowed the citrus ancestor to expand across south and east Asia in a rapid genetic radiation. After the plant crossed the Wallace line, a second radiation took place in the early Pliocene (about 4 million years ago) to give rise to the Australian species.

Most modern cultivars are actually hybrids derived from a small number of 'pure' original species. Though hundreds of species names have been assigned, a recent genomic study by Wu et al. identified just ten ancestral species of citrus among more than a hundred cultivars studied. Of these ten, seven were native to Asia:

- Pomelo (Citrus maxima)
- The 'pure' mandarins (C. reticulata – most mandarin cultivars were hybrids of this species with pomelo)
- Citrons (C. medica)
- Micranthas (C. micrantha)
- The Ichang papeda (C. cavaleriei)
- The mangshanyegan (C. mangshanensis)
- The oval (Nagami) kumquat (Fortunella margarita or C. japonica var. margarita)

Three from Australia were identified:

- The desert lime (C. glauca)
- Round lime (C. australis)
- The finger lime (C. australasica)

Many other cultivars previously identified as species were found to be closely related variants (subspecies or varieties) or hybrids of these species, though not all cultivars were evaluated. Subsequent studies have added two additional species to this list of pure species: a mandarin native to the Ryukyu Islands designated C. ryukyuensis, and a rare wild species from Southeast Asia, the mountain citron. A number of further species originally placed in other genera have recently been subsumed into Citrus as a result of phylogenetic analysis, but these have yet to be characterized on a phylogenomic level to confirm their status as unique pure species.

Artificial interbreeding seems possible among all citrus plants, though there are certain limitations to natural interbreeding due to plant physiology and differences in natural breeding seasons. This ability to cross-pollinate extends to some related species that some classifications place in distinct genera. The ability of citrus hybrids to self-pollinate and to reproduce sexually also helps create new varieties, as does spontaneous mutation and genome duplication. The three most predominant ancestral citrus taxa are citron (C. medica), pomelo (C. maxima), and mandarin (C. reticulata). These taxa interbreed freely, despite being quite genetically distinct, having arisen through allopatric speciation, with citrons evolving in northern Indochina, pomelos in the Malay Archipelago, and mandarins in Vietnam, southern China, and Japan. The hybrids of these taxa include familiar citrus fruits like oranges, grapefruit, lemons, and some limes and tangerines. These three have also been hybridized with other citrus taxa, for example, the Key lime arose from a citron crossing with a micrantha. In many cases, the varieties are propagated asexually, and lose their characteristic traits if bred. Some of the hybrids have in turn interbred with one another hybrid or with the original taxa, making the citrus family tree a complicated network.

Citrus fruits clustered by genetic similarity of partial sequences. Ternary diagram of hybrids of the three major ancestral species. Data from Curk et al. (2016).

Kumquats do not naturally interbreed with core taxa due to different flowering times, but hybrids (such as the calamansi) exist. Australian limes are native to Australia and Papua New Guinea, so they did not naturally interbreed with the core taxa, but they have been crossbred with mandarins and calamansis by modern breeders. Humans have deliberately bred new citrus fruits by propagating seedlings of spontaneous crosses (e.g. clementines), creating or selecting mutations of hybrids, (e.g. Meyer lemon), and crossing different varieties (e.g. 'Australian Sunrise', a finger lime and calamansi cross).

== Citrus naming systems ==
Initially, many citrus types were identified and named by individual taxonomists, resulting in a large number of identified species: 870 by a 1969 count. Some order was brought to citrus taxonomy by two unified classification schemes, those of Chōzaburō Tanaka and Walter Tennyson Swingle, that can be viewed as extreme alternative visions of the genus.

Swingle's system divided the Citrinae subtribe into three groups, the 'primitive citrus' distant relatives, the closer 'near citrus' including citrus-related genera like Atalantia, and the "true citrus", for the species that had historically been placed in Citrus but many of which he elevated to separate genera: Poncirus (trifoliate orange), Fortunella (kumquat), Eremocitrus (desert limes), Microcitrus (finger and round limes), as well as an additional genus, Clymenia, formerly thought to be a citrus hybrid. His Citrus he likewise subdivided into two subgenera: citrons, pomelos, mandarins, oranges, grapefruits and lemons were placed in subgenus Eucitrus (later called simply subgenus Citrus), while the hardy but slow-growing trees with relatively unpalatable fruit he placed in subgenus Papeda. His genus Citrus consisted of just 16 species, dividing them further into varieties, and lastly cultivars or hybrids. The Swingle system is generally followed globally today with much modification; there are still large differences in nomenclature between countries and individual scientists.

The 'Tanaka system' (1954) instead provides a separate species name for each cultivar, regardless of whether it is pure or a hybrid of two or more species or varieties, and resulted in 159 identified species. It thus represents an example of taxonomic "splitting", and in assigning separate species names to horticultural variants does not conform to the standard species concept. Tanaka also divided into subgenera, but different than in Swingle's system, introducing Archicitrus (which he subdivided into five sections, Papeda, Limonellus, Aruntium, Citrophorum and Cephalocitrus) and Metacitrus (divided into Osmocitrus, Acrumen and Pseudofortunella). This system is commonly used in Tanaka's native Japan. A 1969 analysis by Hodgson intended to harmonize the two schemes accepted 36 species.

These initial attempts at Citrus systematization all predated the recognition, which began to gain traction in the mid-1970s, that the majority of cultivars represent hybrids of just three species, citron, mandarin and pomelo. Phylogenetic analysis confirms this hybrid origin of most citrus cultivars, indicating a small number of founder species. While the subgenera suggested by Tanaka proved similar to the phylogenetic divisions of pure founder species, Swingle's subgenera were polyphyletic, and hence do not represent valid taxonomy. His novel genera also fail to withstand phylogenetic analysis. Swingle had elevated kumquats into a separate genus Fortunella, while two genera were suggested by him for the Australian limes, Microcitrus and Eremocitrus. However, genomic analysis shows these groups nested within the phylogenetic tree of Citrus. Since their placement in distinct genera would make Citrus a paraphyletic grouping, it has been suggested that all of these are correctly members of the genus Citrus. Similarly, genomic analysis has suggested that other genera previously split off from Citrus likewise belong within this expanded phylogenetic concept of the genus Citrus, including Clymenia, Oxanthera (false oranges, moved out of Citrus to a different branch of the tribe Citreae and given a new genus by Swingle) and more controversially Poncirus, which is the earliest branching of Swingle's genera, and a genus not previously recognized as a close citrus relative, Feroniella. There remains a lack of consensus as to which wild plants and hybrids merit distinct species status, a phenomenon exacerbated by the prior failure to correctly identify the genetically pure citrus strains and distinguish them from hybrids.

Ollitrault, Curk and Krueger system of hybrid citrus species names. Not all possible combinations are known to exist.

In 2020, a new taxonomic system was proposed by Ollitrault, Curk and Krueger, with the goal of harmonizing traditional naming systems with the new genomic data that have both allowed the pure ancestral species to be distinguished from hybrids, and enabled the ancestry of those hybrids to be identified among the ancestral species. In their system, each ancestral species has a binomial name, while a unique species name is reserved for each combination of ancestral species, independent of the specific order of crossing or proportional representation of the ancestral species in a given hybrid.

Individual hybrids of each type are then distinguished by a variety name. Thus hybrids that are crosses between mandarin (C. reticulata) and pomelo (C. maxima) would all be C. × aurantium, with specific crosses including: C. × aurantium var. sinensis for the sweet orange, C. × aurantium var. paradisi for grapefruit, and C. × aurantium var. clementina for the clementine. Likewise, hybrids combining mandarins and citrons would all be varieties of C. × limonia, those of pomelo and citron, C. x lumia, while tri-species hybrids of citrons, pomelos and mandarins would be C. × limon, and a tetra-species cross involving these three species along with C. micrantha would be C. × latifolia.

This naming system focused on the four species ancestral to most commercial hybrids, and did not include similar species designations for more exotic hybrids involving other citrus species, such as the Ichang papeda, kumquat, or trifoliate orange. Likewise, Ollitrault, Curk and Krueger accepted that the whole-genome characterization necessary to unambiguously assign a hybrid species name under their system is not available for many varieties.

== Core species and hybrids ==
Many Citrus species are hybrids of citron, mandarin and pomelo.

Examples of hybrid Citrus, showing their derivation from the pure founder species

Most commercial varieties are descended from one or more of the 'core species', citrons, mandarins, and pomelos, which share in common a complex floral anatomy that gives rise to more complex fruit. These core species, and to a lesser extent other citrus, have given rise to a wide variety of hybrids for which the naming is inconsistent. The same common names may be given to different species, citrus hybrids or mutations. For example, citrus with green fruit tend to be called 'limes' independent of their origin: Australian limes, musk limes, Key limes, kaffir limes, Rangpur limes, sweet limes and wild limes are all genetically distinct. Fruit with similar ancestry may be quite different in name and traits (e.g. grapefruit, common oranges, and ponkans are all mandarin–pomelo hybrids). Many traditional citrus groups, such as true sweet oranges and lemons, seem to be bud sports, clonal families of cultivars that have arisen from distinct spontaneous mutations of a single hybrid ancestor. Most of these species are native to Asia. Novel varieties, and in particular seedless or reduced-seed varieties, have also been generated from these unique hybrid ancestral lines using gamma irradiation of budwood to induce mutations.

=== Ancestral species ===
==== Mandarins ====
Mandarin oranges (tangerines, satsumas – Citrus reticulata) are one of the basic species, but the name mandarin is also used more generally for all small, easily peeled citrus, including a large range of hybrids. Swingle saw three species of mandarin, while Tanaka identified five groups with a total of 36 species. Webber (1948) divided them into four groups, king, satsuma, mandarin, and tangerine, and Hodgson (1967) saw in them four species. Genomic analysis suggests just one mainland-Asian species, Citrus reticulata.

In an observation originally made in a study of their hybrid progeny, a subspecies-level division has been characterized in this mainland-Asian species. Wang, et al., found that domesticated mandarins fell into two genetic clusters that linked to different branches of the tree of wild mandarins, had different deduced population histories and had distinct patterns of pomelo introgression, suggesting that they derive from separate domestication events. Wu, et al., would later extend this observation, similarly detecting two divergent subspecies within the wild populations that gave rise to Wang's northern and southern domesticate classes, which they described as 'common mandarins' and mangshanyeju (Mangshan wild mandarins). It was specifically in the latter that a genetic mutation caused by the insertion of a transposable element adjacent to the CitRKD1 gene led to the ability of these mandarins to reproduce asexually through apomixis, a characteristic passed down to the subspecies' hybrid descendants such as hybrid mandarins, oranges, lemons and grapefruit.

A distinct class of mandarins are native to the Japanese and neighboring islands. Initial characterization of one of these, the Tachibana orange (Tanaka's Citrus tachibana), native to Taiwan, the Ryukyu Islands and southern Japan, classified it as a subspecies nesting within the wild mandarins of the East-Asian mainland. However, a directed study of these island cultivars revealed the existence of a second mandarin true-species that diverged from the mainland species between 2.2 and 2.8 million years ago, following the geographical isolation of the islands through rising sea levels. Unlike the mainland species, this Ryukyu mandarin, named C. ryukyuensis, reproduces sexually. The previously-characterized island cultivars, including the Tachibana, proved to be either natural F1 hybrids between this native Ryukyu mandarin and mainland mandarin species that had recolonized the islands after a period of isolation, or else later agricultural hybrids with introduced Asian cultivars.

All characterized commercial varieties called mandarins are actually inter-species hybrids. Wu, et al., divided mandarins into three types, based on their degree of hybridization. In addition to genetically pure mandarins, a second type are the result of hybridization with pomelos followed by subsequent backcrossing with mandarins to retain only a few pomelo traits. The third type arose more recently from the crossing of these hybrids again with pomelos or sweet oranges (which are themselves crosses of hybrid mandarins and pomelos). This produces mandarins with more, longer stretches of pomelo DNA. Some commercial mandarins are hybrids with lemons, while several were found to have a significant contribution (35–65%) from papedas.

'Mangshan wild mandarin' is a name used for all of the similar-looking wild mandarin-like fruit of the Mangshan area, but has been found to include two genetically-distinct groups, one representing pure, wild "true" mandarins (the mangshanyeju subspecies of C. reticulata), and the other the genetically-distinct and only distantly-related species, the mangshanyegan (C. mangshanensis), akin to another local fruit known as the yuanju, and found to be the most distant branch of all the citrus.

In a limited genomic analysis, Feroniella was found to cluster with C. reticulata deep within Citrus, leading botanist David Mabberley to propose that the sole member of this genus, F. lucida, be moved to the genus Citrus and rechristened C. lucida. Though this has received a degree of acceptance, two modern phylogenetic studies obtained results in conflict with Mabberley's, and retained Feronioella as a distinct genus closely related to Luminia, with which Swingle had placed Feroniella in a grouping referred to as 'wood apples'.

==== Pomelos ====
The pomelo (Citrus maxima), a second of the core species from which most citrus hybrids have derived, is native to southeast Asia. Among the hybrids deriving from mandarin/pomelo crosses, there is a direct correlation between the proportion of pomelo DNA in the hybrid and fruit size, while the more palatable mandarins are those that have received specific genes from pomelos that alter their acidity. Some of the more common pomelos are genetically pure, while a number have a single small region of introgressed mandarin DNA on one chromosome, the result of a cross followed by extensive backcrossing with pomelo.

==== Citrons ====
Varieties of true (non-hybrid) citron (Citrus medica) have distinctly different forms. The citron usually propagates by cleistogamy, a self-pollination within an unopened flower, and this results in the lowest levels of heterozygosity among the citrus species. Because of this, it will generally serve as the male parent of any hybrid progeny. Many citron varieties were proven to be non-hybrids despite their rather dramatic morphological differences; however, the florentine citron is probably of hybrid origin. Genetic analysis of citrons has shown that they divide into three groups. One cluster consists of wild citrons that originated in China and produce non-fingered fruit with pulp and seeds. A second cluster, also native to China, consist of the fingered citrons, most of which are seedless and must be propagated artificially. The third cluster represents the Mediterranean citrons, thought to have originally been introduced there from India.

Some fingered citron varieties are used in buddhist offerings, and some more common varieties are used as the etrog in the Jewish harvest festival of Sukkot. There is also a specific variety of citron called etrog. The Mountain citron is a complex citrus hybrid that only includes trace amounts of true citron.

==== Papedas ====
Swingle coined the Citrus subgenus Papeda to separate its members from the more edible citrus that also differ from other citrus in having stamens that grow separately, not united at their base. He included in this group the kaffir lime (Citrus hystrix), as well as its likely taxonomic synonym the micrantha (Citrus micrantha), and the Ichang papeda (Citrus cavaleriei). Since the latter two species locate to different branches of the citrus phylogenetic tree, the group would be polyphyletic and not a valid division. Both the micrantha and the Ichang papeda have also given rise to hybrids with other citrus. Sometimes included among the papedas was the mountain citron, not affiliated with the true citrons, and subsequently found to be a pure species most closely related to kumquats.

==== Kumquats ====
Kumquats were originally classified by Carl Peter Thunberg as Citrus japonica in his 1784 book Flora Japonica. In 1915, Swingle reclassified them in a separate genus, Fortunella, named in honor of Robert Fortune. He divided the kumquats into two subgenera, the Protocitrus, containing the primitive Hong Kong kumquat (F. hindsii), and Eufortunella, comprising the round (F. japonica), oval kumquat (F. margarita) and Meiwa kumquats (F. crassifolia), to which Tanaka added two others, the Malayan kumquat (which he christened F. swinglei but more commonly called F. polyandra) and the Jiangsu kumquat (F. obovata), and Huang added another, F. bawangica. Since the kumquat is a cold-hardy species, there are many hybrids between common citrus members and the kumquat. Swingle coined a separate hybrid genus for these, which he called × Citrofortunella.

Subsequent study of the many commercial citrus lineages revealed such complexity that the genera could not be separated, and genomic analysis rooted Fortunella within the polyphyletic tree of Citrus. As a result there is growing acceptance for the restoration of kumquats to Citrus, though the assignment of individual species among the kumquats remains controversial due in part to insufficient genomic data on the variants. The Flora of China unites all kumquats as the single species, Citrus japonica. Based on chromosomal analysis, Yasuda, et al., identified Jiangsu and Malayan kumquats as hybrids and see the remainder of the Eufortunella subgenus as a single species, while retaining a distinct species designation for the Hong Kong kumquat.

==== Australian and New Guinean species ====
Australian and New Guinean citrus species had been viewed as belonging to separate genera by Swingle, who placed in Microcitrus all but the desert lime, which he assigned to Eremocitrus. However, genomic analysis shows that though they form a distinct clade from other citrus, this is nested within the citrus phylogenetic tree, most closely related to kumquats, suggesting that all these species should be included in the genus Citrus. Wu, et al., found that several of the finger lime cultivars were actually hybrids with round lime, and concluded there were just three species among those tested, desert lime (C. glauca), round lime (C. australis) and the finger lime (C. australasica), though their analysis did not include other types previously identified as distinct species. In more limited genomic analysis, the New Guinea wild lime, Clymenia and Oxanthera (false orange) all cluster with the Australian limes as members of Citrus. The outback lime is a desert lime agriculturally selected for more commercial traits, while some commercial varieties of the Australian lime are hybrids with mandarins, lemons, and/or sweet oranges. Clymenia will hybridize with kumquats and some limes.

==== Trifoliate orange ====
The trifoliate orange is a cold-hardy plant distinguishable by its compound leaves with three leaflets and its deciduous nature, but is close enough to the genus Citrus to be used as a rootstock. Swingle moved the trifoliate orange from Citrus to its own genus, Poncirus, but Mabberley and Zhang reunited the genera Swingle had separated back into Citrus. Early phylogenetic analysis nested Poncirus within the citrus, consistent with a single genus, but the genomic sequencing of Wu, et al., placed it outside the cluster representing Citrus, and the authors retained a separate genus Poncirus. Ollitrault, Curk and Krueger indicate that the majority of data are consistent with the enlarged Citrus that includes the trifoliate orange, though they recognize that many botanists still follow Swingle. A further complication to the placement of Poncirus is the conflicting phylogenetic data: its nuclear genome places Poncirus as an outgroup to other citrus, while its chloroplast DNA (cpDNA) nests within a Citrus subclade. This led Talon, et al. to conclude that the trifoliate orange likely is either the progeny of an ancient hybridization between a core citrus and an unidentified more distant relative, or at some time in its history acquired an introgressed cpDNA genome from another species.

A second trifoliate orange, Poncirus polyandra, was discovered in Yunnan (China) in the 1980s. Zhang and Mabberley later concluded this was likely a hybrid between the trifoliate orange and some other Citrus. However, recent genomic analysis of P. polyandra showed low heterozygosity, the opposite of what one would expect for a hybrid. Were Poncirus subsumed into Citrus, C. polyandra would be unavailable, so C. polytrifolia has been suggested as a replacement species name for this Yunnan trifoliate orange.

==== Photo gallery ====
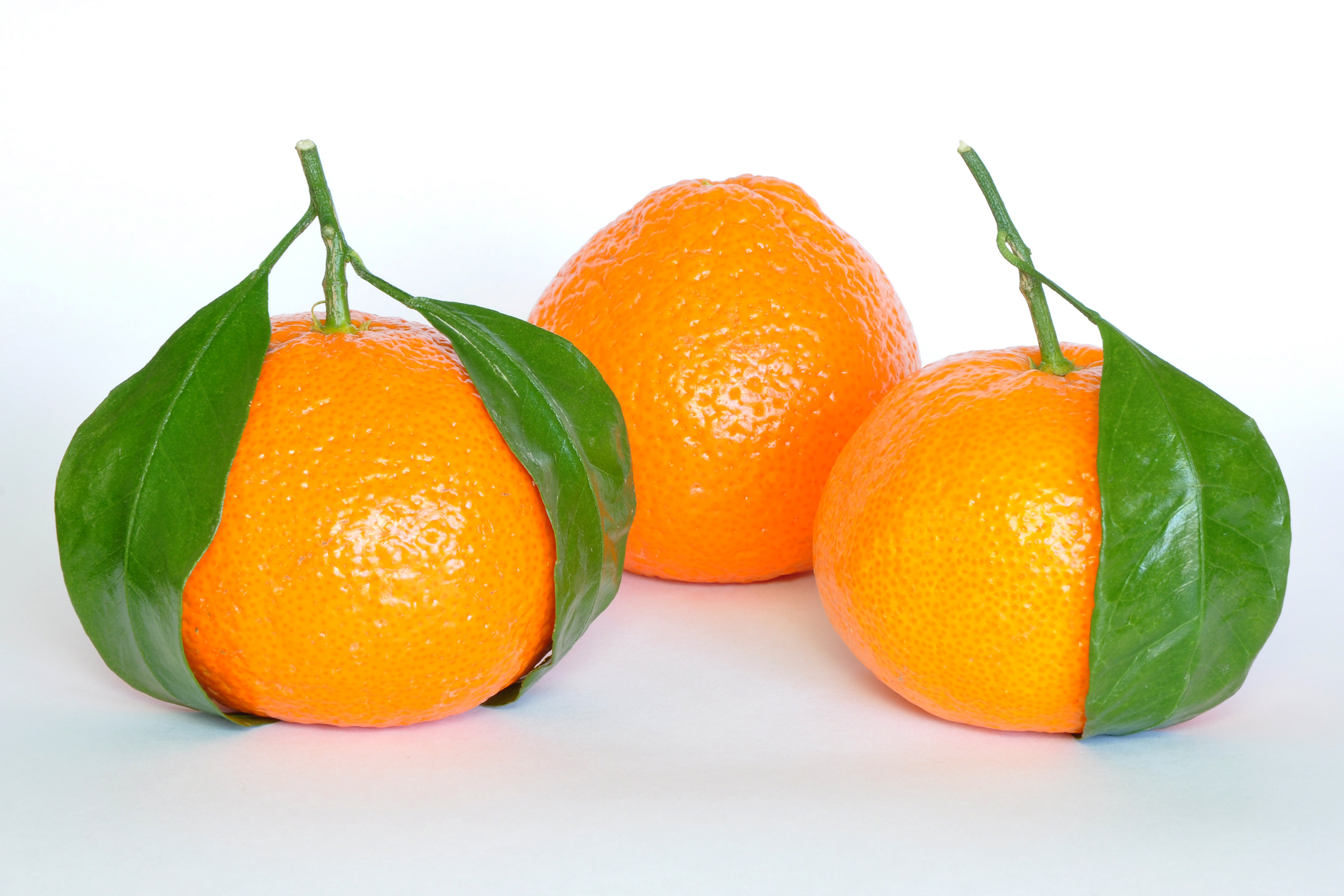
Mandarin orange is a true species (Citrus reticulata); it is one of the progenitors of most cultivated citrus

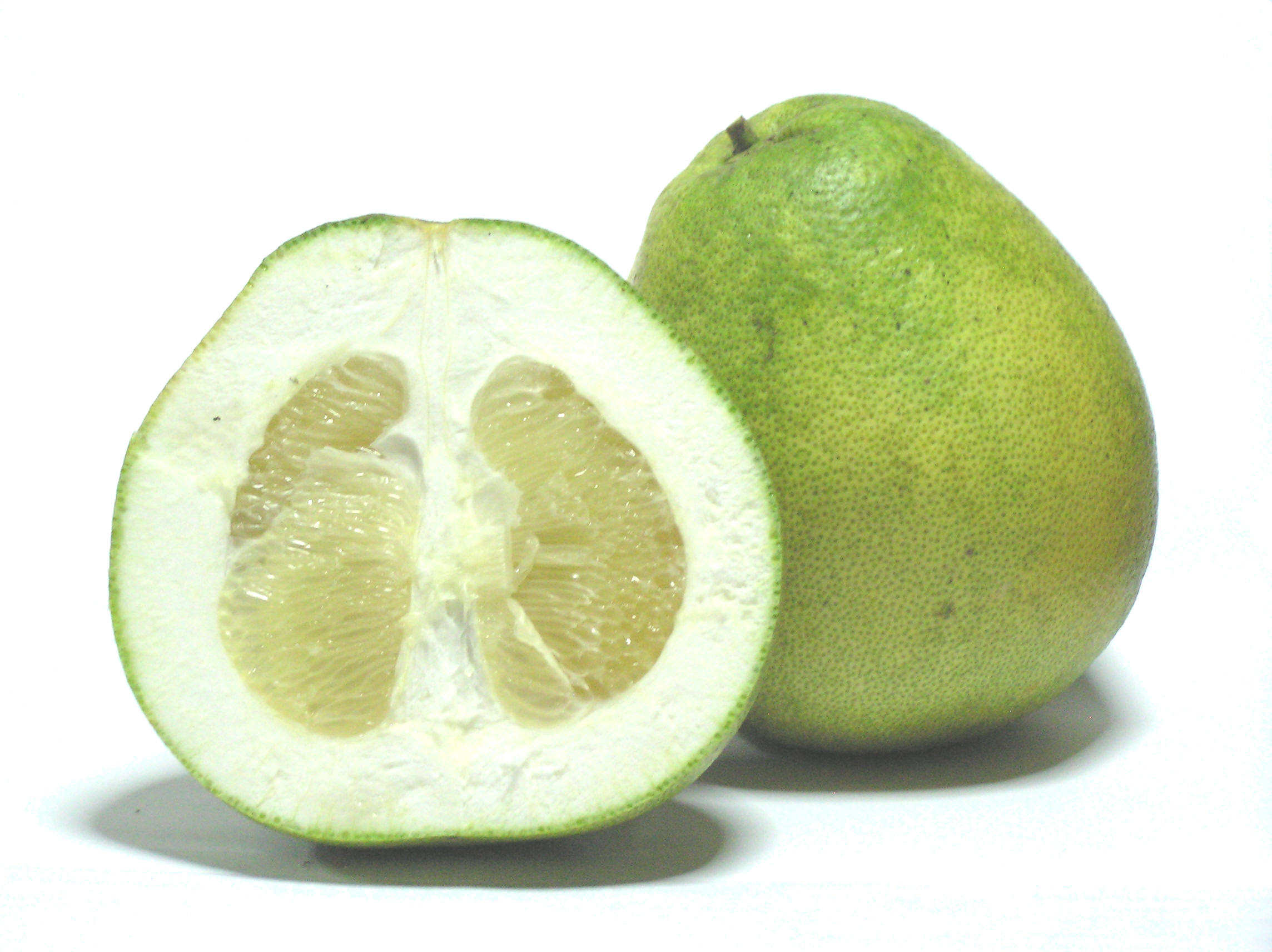
The pomelo (Citrus maxima)

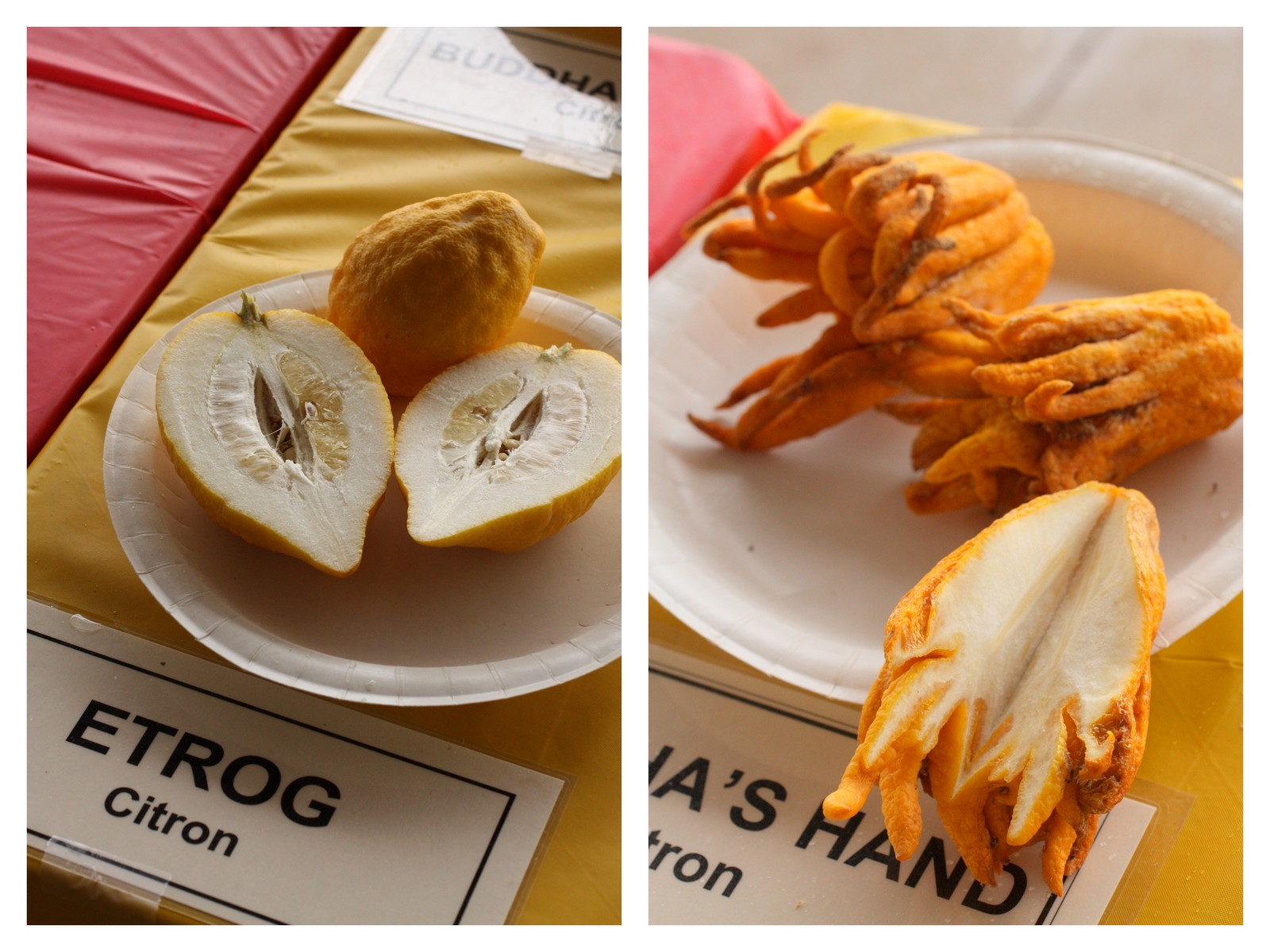
These varieties of citron (Citrus medica), Greek and fingered, have distinctly different appearances

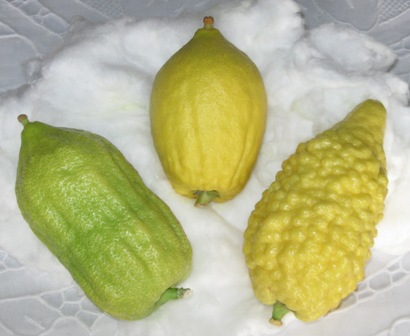
Three varieties of etrogim (Citrus medica acceptable for Jewish ritual use) that are all true non-hybrid citrons

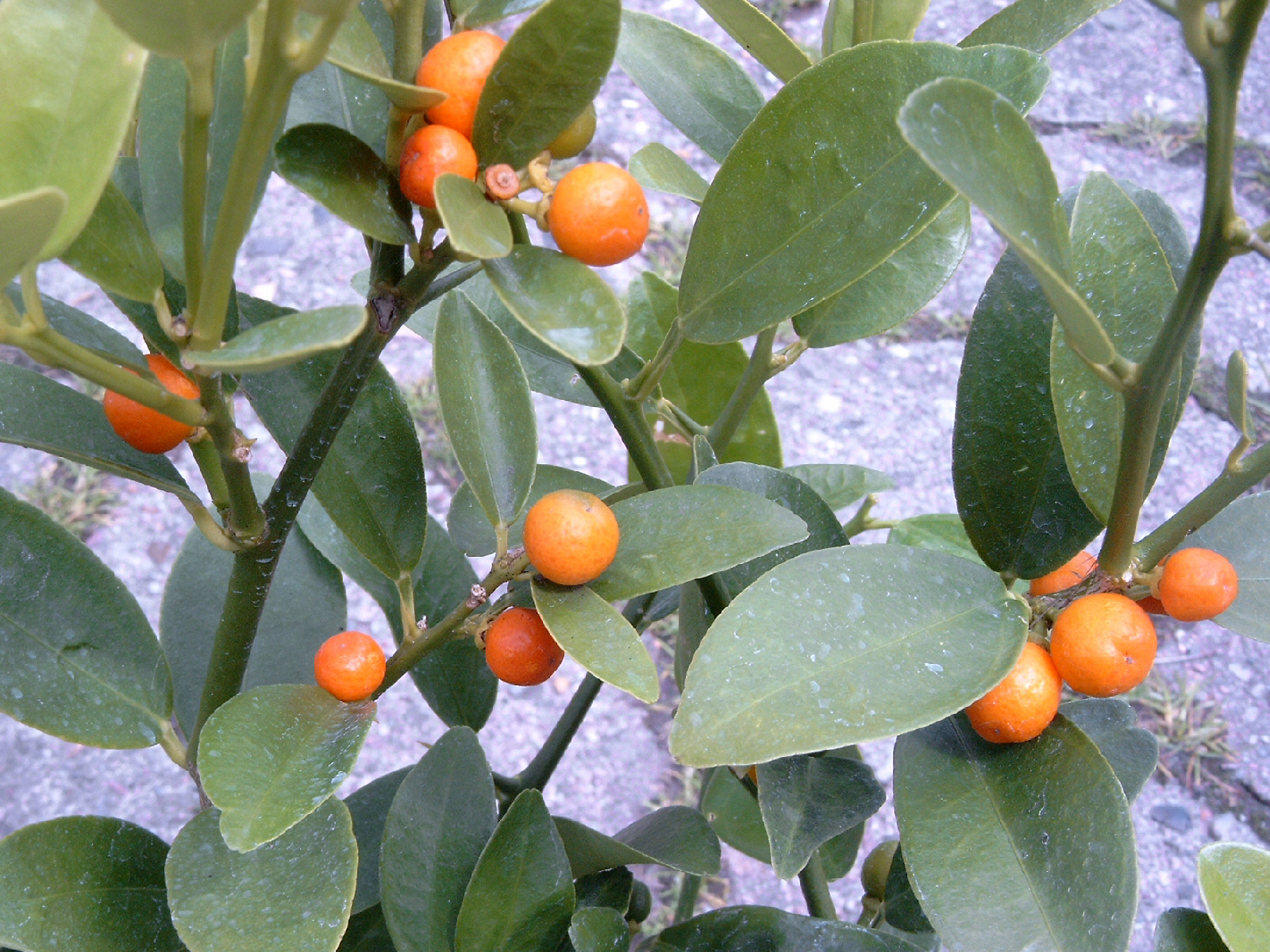
Hong Kong kumquat

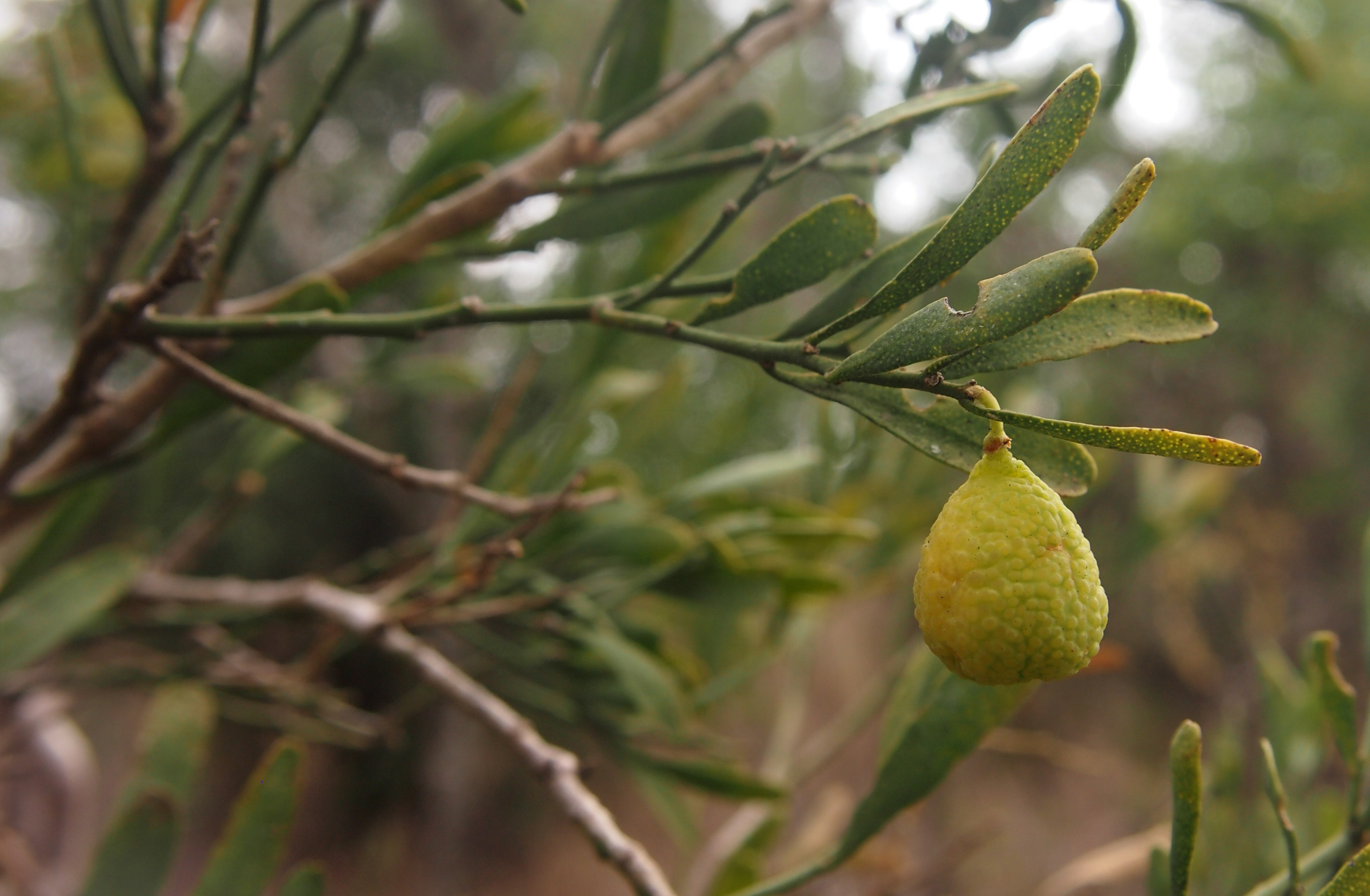
The Australian desert lime, Citrus glauca, hangs from a branch

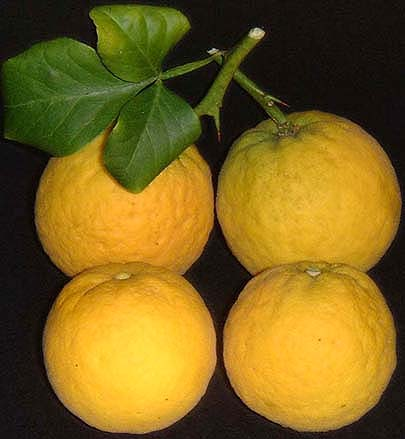
Trifoliate orange

== Hybrids ==
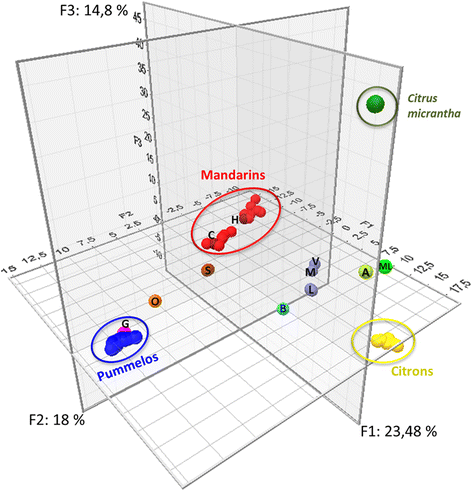
Three-dimensional projection of a principal component analysis of citrus hybrids, with citron (yellow), pomelo (blue), mandarin (red), and micrantha (green) defining the axes. Hybrids are expected to plot between their parents. ML: 'Mexican' lime; A: 'Alemow'; V: 'Volkamer' lemon; M: 'Meyer' lemon; L: Regular and 'Sweet' lemons; B: Bergamot orange; H: Haploid clementine; C: Clementines; S: Sour oranges; O: Sweet oranges; G: Grapefruits. Figure from Curk, et al. (2014).

Citrus hybrids include many varieties and species that have been selected by plant breeders. This is done not only for the useful characteristics of the fruit, but also for plant size and growth characteristics such as cold-tolerance. Some citrus hybrids occurred naturally, and others have been deliberately created, either by cross pollination and selection among the progeny, or (rarely, and only recently) as somatic hybrids. The aim of plant breeding of hybrids is to use two or more different citrus varieties or species, in order to get traits intermediate between those of the parents, or to transfer individual desirable traits of one parent into the other. In some cases, particularly with the natural hybrids, it has been viewed as hybrid speciation and the new plants have been viewed as different species from any of their parents. In older taxonomic systems, citrus hybrids have often been given unique hybrid names, marked with a multiplication sign after the word Citrus (or abbreviation C.); for example, the Key lime is Citrus × aurantifolia, and also are referred to by joining the names of the crossed species or hybrids that produced them, as with sunquat – C. limon × japonica. Styling a hybrid as such a cross between two species can present challenges. In some cases the parental species that gave rise to a hybrid have yet to be determined, while genotyping reveals some hybrids to descend from three or more ancestral species. In the Ollitrault system, a hybrid will be given a species name corresponding to the ancestral species contributions to it, as well as a distinctive variety name.

=== Labelling of hybrids ===
Hybrid taxonomy is inconsistent. There is disagreement over whether to assign species names to hybrids, and even modern hybrids of known parentage are sold under general common names that give little information about their ancestry, or even imply technically incorrect identity. This can be a problem for those who cannot eat some citrus varieties. Drug interactions with chemicals found in some citrus, including grapefruit and Seville oranges, make the ancestry of citrus fruit of interest: many commonly sold citrus varieties are grapefruit hybrids or pomelo-descended grapefruit relatives. One medical review has advised patients on medication to avoid all citrus juice, although some citrus fruits contain none of the problematic furanocoumarins. Citrus allergies can also be specific to only some fruit or some parts of some fruit.

=== Major citrus hybrids ===
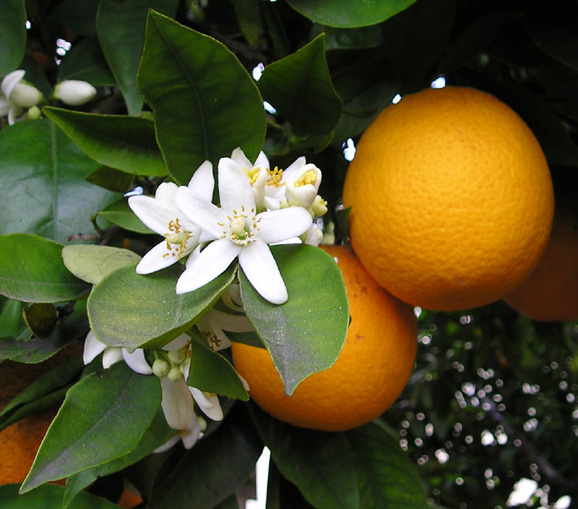
The common oranges as well as the grapefruits are hybrids between the mandarin and the pomelo.

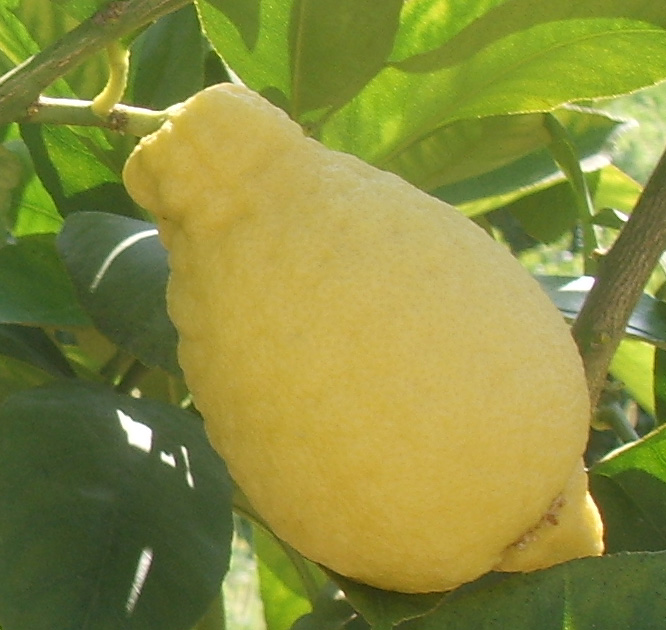
A variety of lumia

The most common citrus hybrids that are sometimes treated as a species by themselves, especially in folk taxonomy, are:

- Orange: a name used for several distinct crosses between pomelo and a mandarin orange. They have the orange color of the mandarin in their outer peels and segments, and are easier to peel than the pomelos but not as easy as mandarins. Oranges are all intermediate between the two ancestors in size, flavor and shape. The bitter orange and sweet orange both arose from mandarin-pomelo crosses, the former involving a pure mandarin, the latter with a mandarin already containing small amounts of pomelo.
- Grapefruit: grapefruits, like oranges, include genetic contributions from both mandarin and pomelo, but more of the latter, arising from a natural backcross of a sweet orange with a pomelo. The 'cocktail grapefruit', or mandelo, is distinct, instead the product of a low-acid pomelo variety hybridized with a mandarin that itself was a cross between two distinct mandarin stocks.
- Lemon: "true" lemons derive from one common hybrid ancestor, having diverged by mutation. The original lemon was a hybrid between a male citron and a female sour orange, itself a pomelo/pure-mandarin hybrid; citrons contribute half of the genome, while the other half is divided between pomelo and mandarin. There are other hybrids also known as 'lemons'. Rough lemons arose from a cross between citron and mandarin, without the pomelo contribution found in true lemons, while the Meyer lemon comes from a citron crossed with a sweet (as opposed to sour) orange.
- Limes: A highly diverse group of hybrids go by this name. Rangpur limes, like rough lemons, arose from crosses between citron and mandarin. The sweet limes, so-called due to their low acid pulp and juice, come from crosses of citron with either sweet or sour oranges, while the Key lime arose from a cross between a citron and a micrantha.

All of these hybrids have in turn been bred back with their parent stocks or with other pure or hybrid citrus to form a broad array of fruits. Naming of these is inconsistent, with some bearing a variant of the name of one of the parents or simply another citrus with superficially-similar fruit, a distinct name, or a portmanteau of ancestral species. The Ponderosa lemon (Citrus limon × medica) and Florentine citron (Citrus × limonimedica) are both true lemon/citron hybrids, the Bergamot orange is a sweet orange/lemon hybrid and the Oroblanco is a grapefruit/pomelo mix, while tangelos are tangerine (mandarin)/pomelo or mandarin/grapefruit hybrids, orangelos result from grapefruit backcrossed with sweet orange, and a sweet orange backcrossed with a tangerine gives the tangor. One lumia, a member of the sweet lemons, is the product of crossing a lemon with a pomelo/citron hybrid, though another lumia variety, the Pomme d'Adam, is a micrantha/citron cross, like the Key lime. The most common and commercially popular 'limes', the Persian limes, are Key lime/lemon hybrids that combine the genetic lineages of four ancestral citrus species: mandarin, pomelo, citron and micrantha.

While most other citrus are diploid, many of the Key lime hybrid progeny have unusual chromosome numbers. For example, the Persian lime is triploid, deriving from a diploid Key lime gamete and a haploid lemon ovule. A second group of Key lime hybrids, including the Tanepao lime and Madagascar lemon, are also triploid but instead seem to have arisen from a backcross of a diploid Key lime ovule with a citron haploid gamete. The "Giant Key lime" owes its increased size to a spontaneous duplication of the entire diploid Key lime genome to produce a tetraploid.

Historically, hybrids with similar characteristics have been placed together in a number of hybrid species, yet relatively recent genomic analysis has revealed some hybrids assigned to the same species to be of quite distinct ancestry. No alternative system of grouping fruit in hybrid species has been adopted.

=== Hybrids from other citrus species ===
While most citrus hybrids derive from the three core species, hybrids have also been derived from the micrantha, Ichang papeda, kumquat, Australian limes, and trifoliate orange. The best known hybrid from micrantha is the Key lime (or Mexican lime), derived from the breeding of a male citron and a female micrantha. Several citrus varieties are Ichang papeda/mandarin crosses (for which Swingle coined the term ichandarin), including Sudachi and Yuzu (which also includes smaller contributions from pomelo and kumquat). Other more exotic citrus have likewise proved hybrids that include papeda. For example, the Indian wild orange, once suggested as a possible ancestor of today's cultivated citrus fruits, yielded conflicting phylogenetic placements in more limited genetic analysis, but study of nuclear markers and chloroplast DNA showed it to be of maternal citron lineage, with further genetic contributions from mandarin and papeda.

==== Citrofortunella ====
A large group of commercial hybrids involve the kumquat, Fortunella in the Swingle system. Citrofortunella was coined as a genus containing intergeneric hybrids between members of the Citrus and the Fortunella, and is named after its parent genera. Such hybrids often combine the cold hardiness of the kumquat with some edibility properties of the other Citrus species. As members of a hybrid genus, these crosses were marked with the multiplication sign before the genus name, for example × Citrofortunella microcarpa. With the return of kumquats to within Citrus, Citrofortunella are no longer viewed as being intergeneric hybrids and thus likewise belong in Citrus, while Citrofortunella as a distinct genus name would no longer be valid. Examples of the Citrofortunella include the calamansi, limequat, and yuzuquat, crossing kumquat with tangerine, Key lime, and yuzu respectively.

==== Citroncirus ====
As with kumquats, the trifoliate orange does not naturally interbreed with core taxa due to different flowering times, but hybrids have been produced artificially between Poncirus and members of the genus Citrus. Genomic analysis of several such hybrids showed all to have involved P. trifoliata and not P. polyandra. In the Swingle system the name coined for these intra-generic crosses, represented as a hybrid genus, is "× Citroncirus". The group includes the citrange, a hybrid between the trifoliate and sweet oranges, and the citrumelo, a hybrid of trifoliate orange and 'Duncan' grapefruit. As with Citrofortunella, were Poncirus subsumed into Citrus, these hybrids would no longer be intergeneric, and would likewise fall within Citrus, rendering Citroncirus invalid.

== Graft hybrids ==
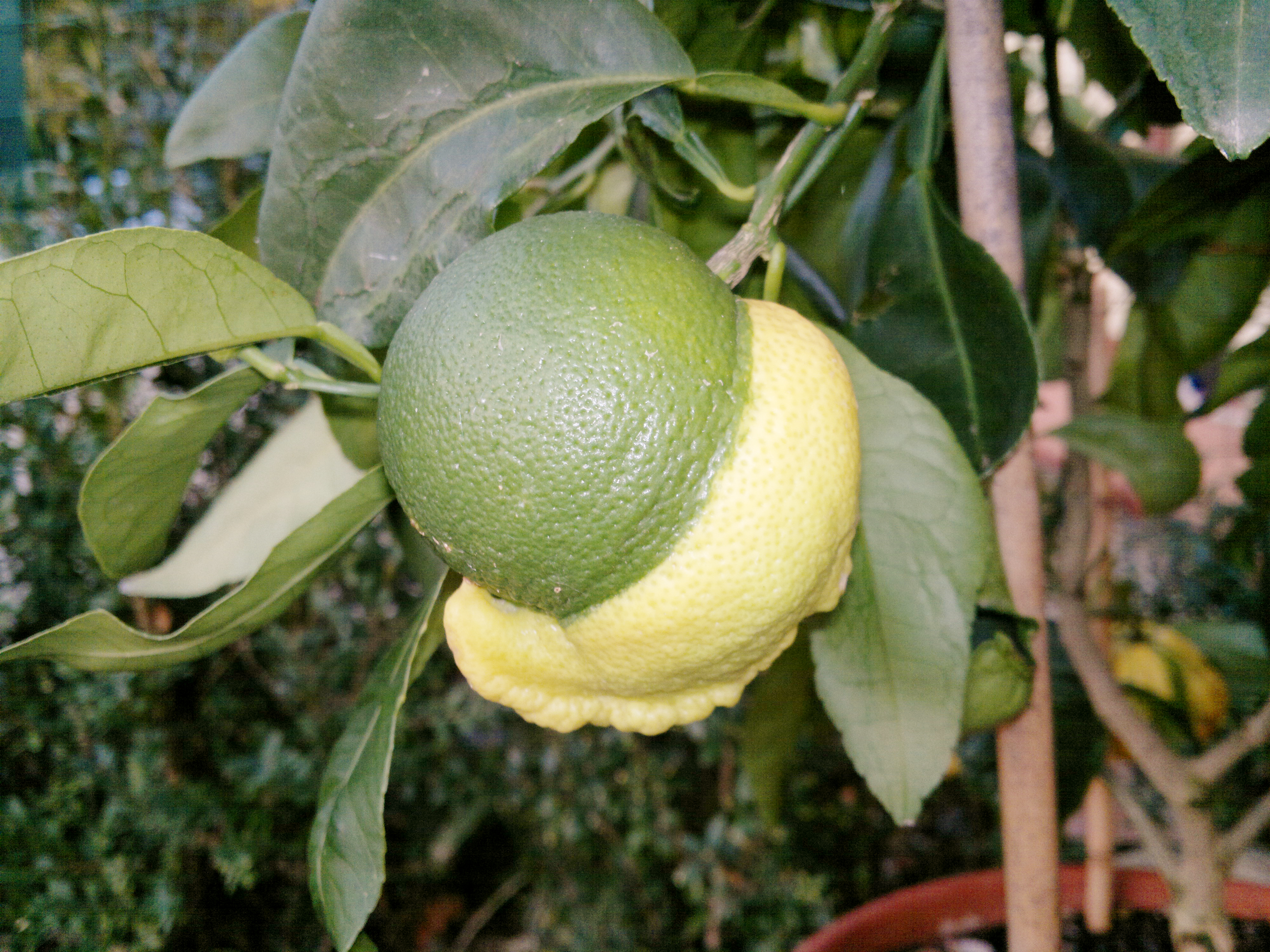
Bizzarria, an unusual graft-chimera.

Due to the sterility of many of the genetic hybrids as well as disease- or temperature-sensitivity of some Citrus trees, domesticated citrus cultivars are usually propagated via grafting to the rootstock of other, often hardier though less palatable citrus or close relatives. As a result, graft hybrids, also called graft-chimaeras, can occur in Citrus. After grafting, the cells from the scion and rootstock are not somatically fused, but rather the cells of the two intermix at the graft site, and can produce shoots from the same tree that bear different fruit. For example, the 'Faris' lemon, has some branches with purple immature leaves and flowers with a purple blush that give rise to sour fruit, while other branches produce genetically distinct sweet lemons coming from white flowers, with leaves that are never purple. Graft hybrids can also give rise to an intermixed shoot that bears fruit with a combination of the characteristics of the two contributing species due to the presence of cells from both in that fruit. In an extreme example, on separate branches Bizzarria produces fruit identical to each of the two contributing species, but also fruit that appears to be half one species and half the other, unmixed. In taxonomy, graft hybrids are distinguished from genetic hybrids by designating the two contributing species with a plus sign between the individual names (Citrus medica + C. aurantium).

== See also ==
- Zanthoxylum fagara — the so-called "wild lime", which is of the Rutaceae family but not a citrus or near relative
- Japanese citrus
- Plant taxonomy
