= Citrus oxanthera =

Conservation status
- Vulnerable (IUCN 2.3)

Scientific classification
- Kingdom: Plantae
- Clade: Tracheophytes
- Clade: Angiosperms
- Clade: Eudicots
- Clade: Rosids
- Order: Sapindales
- Family: Rutaceae
- Genus: Citrus
- Species: C. oxanthera

Binomial name
- Citrus oxanthera Beauvis.

Synonyms
- Atalantia aurantia Vieill. ex Guillaumin; Oxanthera aurantium Tanaka; Oxanthera fragrans Montrouz.

Species of flowering plant

Citrus oxanthera, synonym Oxanthera aurantium, is a species of plant in the family Rutaceae. Sometimes referred to commonly as the orange-flowered oxanthera, it is endemic to New Caledonia.

== Taxonomy ==
Citrus oxanthera has historically been placed in a number of genera, including Atalantia and most recently, Oxanthera, commonly known as false oranges. Phylogenetic analysis showed that Oxanthera species clustered within Citrus, which makes this species a member of that genus, as had been suggested by Georges Beauvisage a century before.
