= False orange =

Group of plants of the family Rutaceae

The false oranges are a group of flowering plants in the Citrus genus, within the family, Rutaceae. They are endemic to New Caledonia.

Though previously viewed as members of Citrus, Swingle moved the false oranges into their own genus, Oxanthera. He placed the genus within the Triphasiinae subtribe of Citreae based on the similar size of their fruit. However, subsequent phylogenetic analysis showed them to cluster in the Citrinae subtribe within the same clade as Swingle's genus Clymenia and the Australian limes, as members of an enlarged monophyletic Citrus, with the suggested relegation of the Oxanthera taxon as a Citrus subgenus. Bayer observed the presence of prominent pulp vesicles in the false oranges, and that their flowers had three to four times as many stamens as petals in their flowers, are both traits similar to other Citrus. The false orange lacks the thorns typical of the Citrus genus, a difference often seen on islands without indigenous herbivores.

Species include:

- Citrus oxanthera — orange flower oxanthera
- Citrus neocaledonica — large-leaf oxanthera
- Citrus undulata — wavy-leaf oxanthera
- Oxanthera brevipes (status pending)
