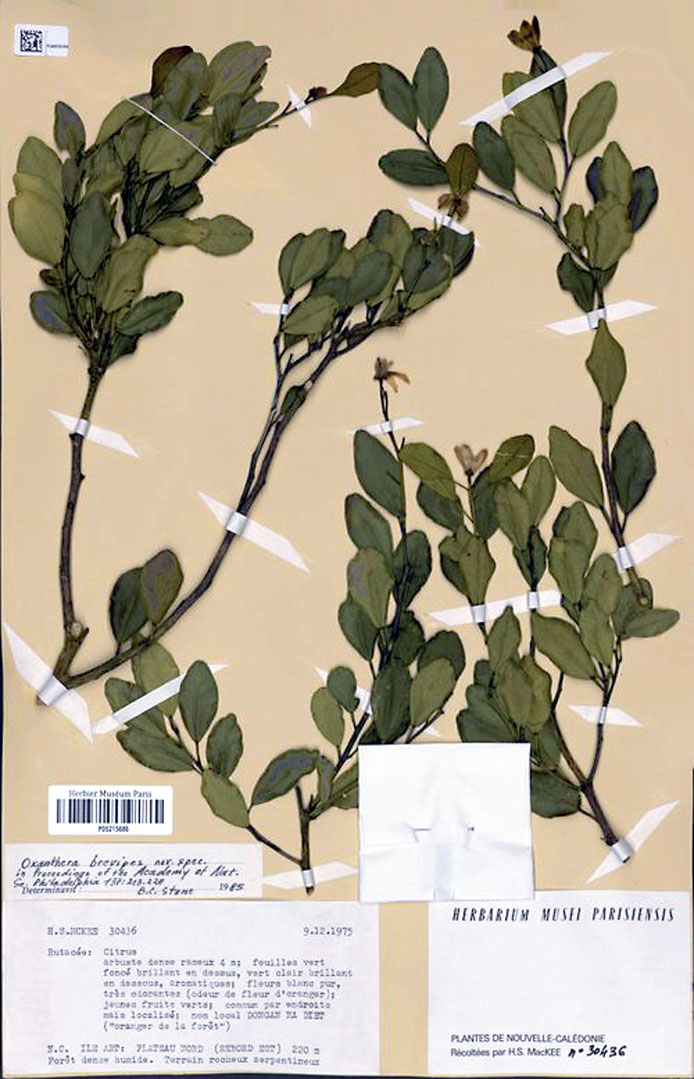
- Preserved specimen of Oxanthera brevipes

Conservation status
- Vulnerable (IUCN 2.3)

Scientific classification
- Kingdom: Plantae
- (unranked): Angiosperms
- (unranked): Eudicots
- (unranked): Rosids
- Order: Sapindales
- Family: Rutaceae
- Genus: Oxanthera, synonym of Citrus
- Species: O. brevipes

Binomial name
- Oxanthera brevipes B.C.Stone

= Oxanthera brevipes =

Species of flowering plant

Oxanthera brevipes is a species of plant in the family Rutaceae. It is endemic to New Caledonia. It was proposed as a novel species by Benjamin C. Stone based on two specimens, distinguished from other false oranges by a non-articulated petiole. The genus Oxanthera has been synonymized with Citrus, but a name in Citrus does not appear to have been published, and Plants of the World Online regards "Oxanthera brevipes" as an unplaced name.
