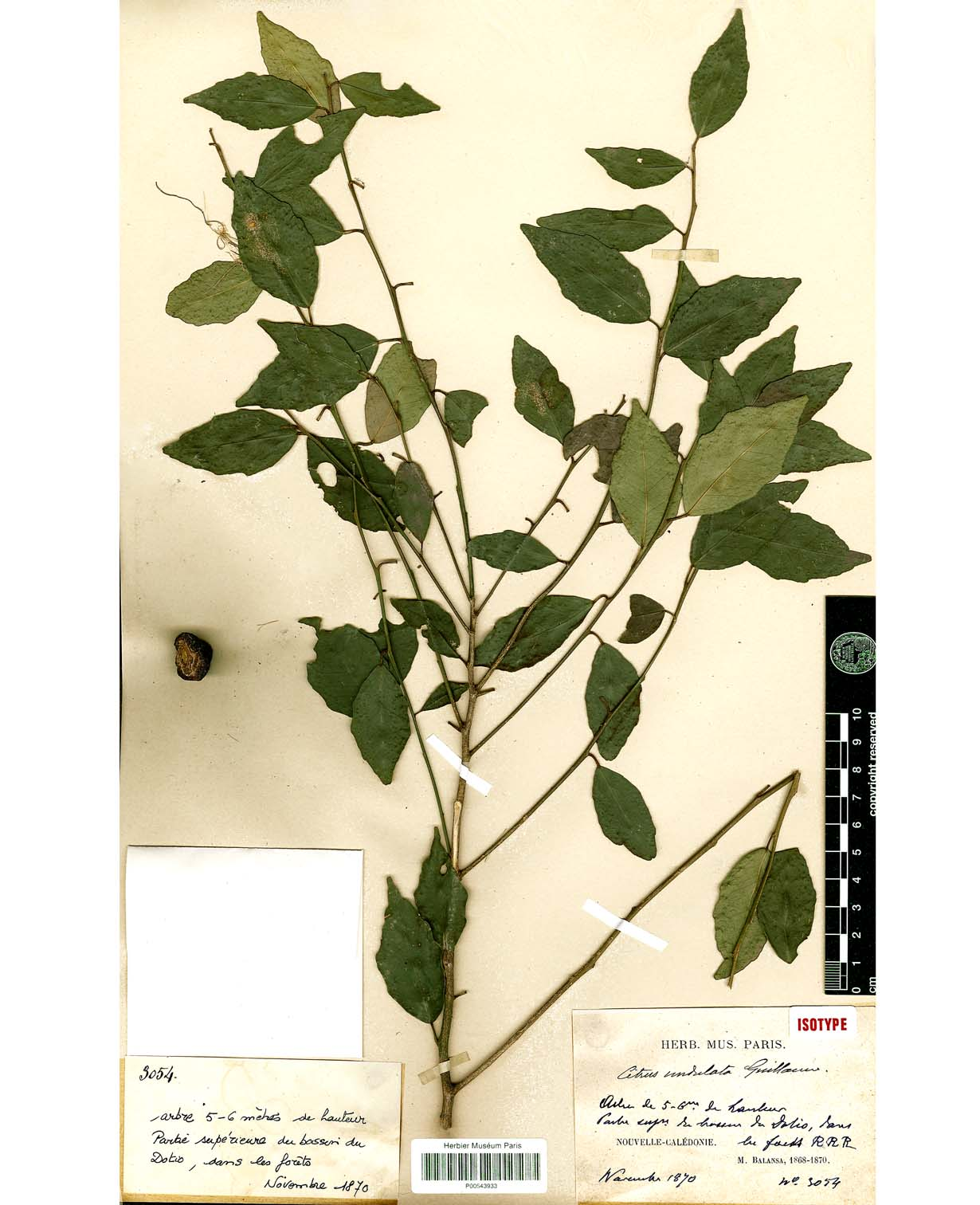

Conservation status
- Critically Endangered (IUCN 2.3)

Scientific classification
- Kingdom: Plantae
- Clade: Tracheophytes
- Clade: Angiosperms
- Clade: Eudicots
- Clade: Rosids
- Order: Sapindales
- Family: Rutaceae
- Genus: Citrus
- Species: C. undulata

Binomial name
- Citrus undulata Guillaumin

Synonyms
- Oxanthera undulata (Guillaumin) Swingle

= Citrus undulata =

Species of flowering plant

Citrus undulata, synonym Oxanthera undulata, the wavy-leaf oxanthera, is a species of plant in the family Rutaceae. It is endemic to New Caledonia. Oxanthera undulata is classified as critically endangered by the IUCN.

== Taxonomy ==
Originally characterized and named as Citrus undulata by André Guillaumin in 1938, this species along with the other false oranges were moved to a novel genus, Oxanthera, in the Swingle and Tanaka systems of citrus taxonomy. Phylogenetic analysis showed that Oxanthera species clustered within Citrus, which makes this species a member of that genus.
