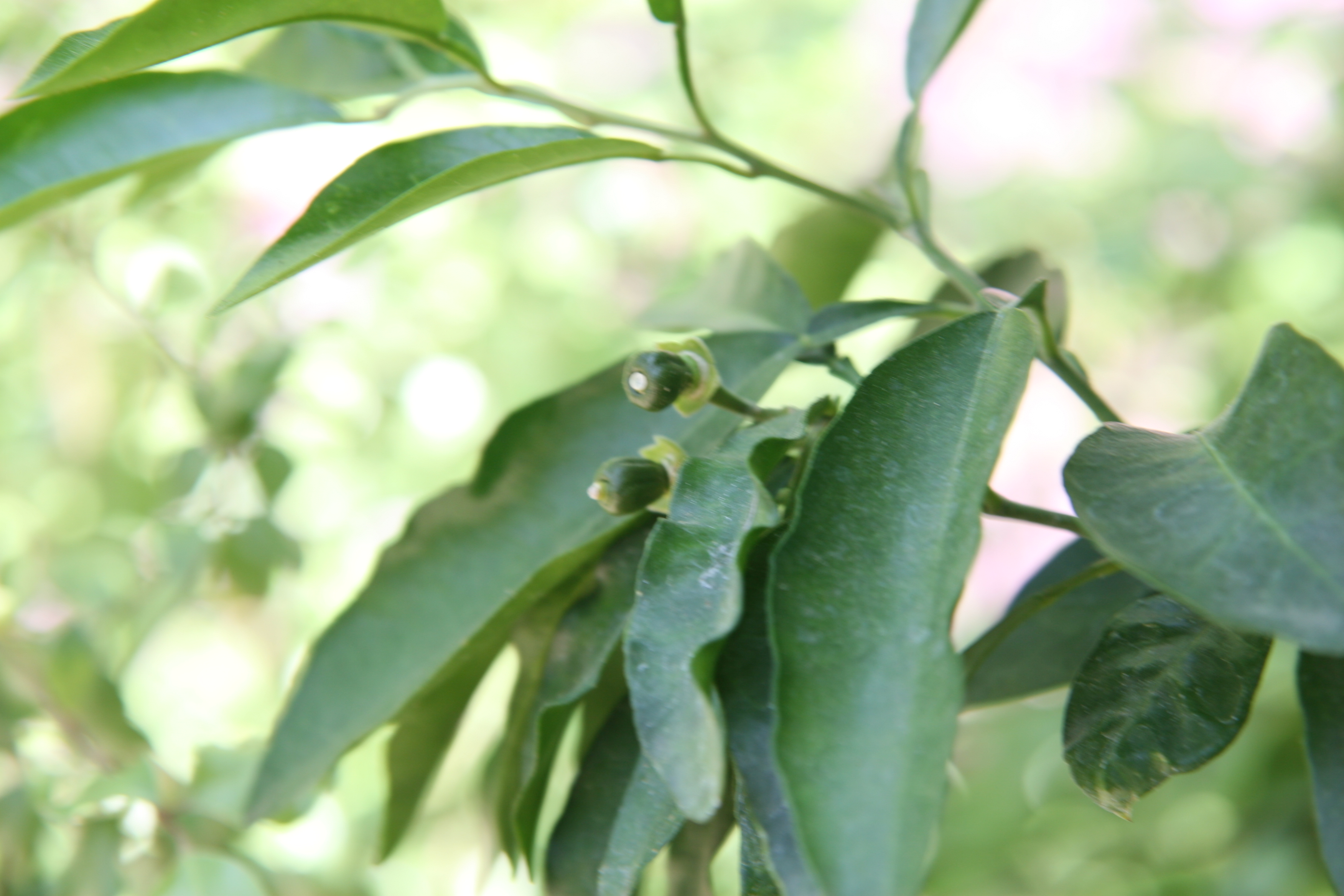

Conservation status
- Endangered (IUCN 2.3)

Scientific classification
- Kingdom: Plantae
- Clade: Tracheophytes
- Clade: Angiosperms
- Clade: Eudicots
- Clade: Rosids
- Order: Sapindales
- Family: Rutaceae
- Genus: Citrus
- Species: C. neocaledonica

Binomial name
- Citrus neocaledonica Guillaumin

Synonyms
- Oxanthera neocaledonica (Guillaumin) Tanaka

= Citrus neocaledonica =

Species of flowering plant

Citrus neocaledonica, synonym Oxanthera neocaledonica, the large leaf oxanthera, is a species of plant in the family Rutaceae. It is endemic to New Caledonia.

== Taxonomy ==
Citrus neocaledonica was originally named as a member of the genus Citrus by André Guillaumin in 1911, but the false oranges were moved to a novel genus Oxanthera in the Swingle and Tanaka systems of citrus taxonomy. Phylogenetic analysis showed that Oxanthera species clustered within Citrus, which makes this species a member of that genus.
