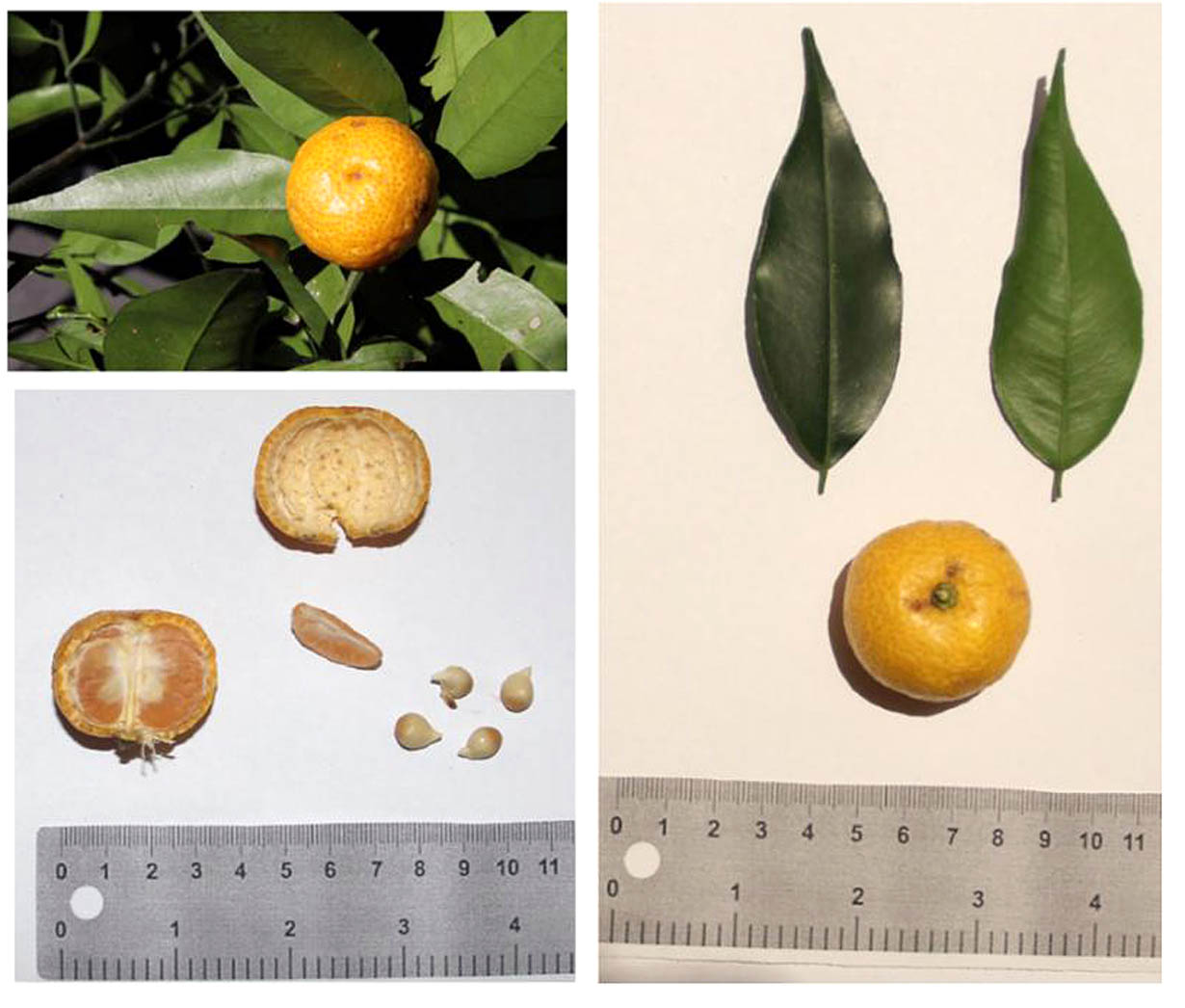

Scientific classification
- Kingdom: Plantae
- Clade: Embryophytes
- Clade: Tracheophytes
- Clade: Angiosperms
- Clade: Eudicots
- Clade: Rosids
- Order: Sapindales
- Family: Rutaceae
- Genus: Citrus
- Species: C. mangshanensis

Binomial name
- Citrus mangshanensis S.W.He & G.F.Liu

= Citrus mangshanensis =

Citrus fruit and plant

Citrus mangshanensis, the mangshanyegan (Chinese: 莽山野柑), is a wild citrus fruit species.

The mangshanyegan is native to mountain forests in Mangshan, Hunan province, China, where it was first reported in the 1980s. It is genetically distinct from the mandarin orange, with which it has morphological similarities, and the term 'Mangshan wild mandarins' as well as the species name C. mangshanensis have been used both for the mangshanyegan and for wild true mandarins of the same region. Genomic sequencing shows the mangshanyegan to be one of a small number of pure (non-hybrid) citrus species, having diverged from other members of the genus at the initial branching of Citrus radiation in the Late Miocene. It is genetically similar to another wild citrus of the region, the yuanju.

== Taxonomy and genetic distinction ==
Citrus mangshanensis is genetically distinct from the mandarin orange (Citrus reticulata), despite some morphological similarities. Genomic studies confirm that it diverged from other citrus species during the Late Miocene, at the initial branching of the Citrus genus. Unlike hybrid citrus varieties, C. mangshanensis does not exhibit genetic admixture and is considered a unique species within the genus. It is also genetically distinct from the wild mandarins of the same region, often referred to as "Mangshan wild mandarins."

== Morphological characteristics ==
The species has distinctive features:

- Leaves: Oval or ovoid, 4.2–.3 cm in length, with thin round teeth.
- Flowers: White petals with a thick and short pistil.
- Fruit: Nearly pear-shaped or oblate, measuring 6–7.5 cm in diameter. The fruit has a short hard tip, is rich in pectin, and contains spherical or ovoid juice cells with oil glands.
- Taste: Extremely sour and slightly bitter.

The fruit ripens in October.

== Habitat and distribution ==
Citrus mangshanensis thrives in mountainous areas at an altitude of approximately 700 meters. It is endemic to southern Hunan, China, particularly in the Mangshan region of the Nanling mountain range.

== Conservation status ==
This species is listed under China's National Key Protected Wild Plants (2021 Edition) as a Level II protected species due to its limited distribution and ecological importance.

== Aroma and Xenia effects ==
The fruit of C. mangshanensis is inedible but contains high amounts of aromatic volatile compounds, including cis- and trans-linalool oxides and β-myrcene, which contribute to its unique balsamic and floral aroma. These compounds distinguish it from other citrus species.

Research has shown that C. mangshanensis pollen can produce a Xenia effect, influencing the aroma profile of other citrus fruits, such as pomelo. Pollination with C. mangshanensis pollen increases the levels of linalool oxides in fruit juice sacs, enhancing aroma quality. This effect is attributed to the upregulation of the CitLO1 gene, which is involved in linalool oxide synthesis.
