= Citrus halimii =

Scientific classification
- Kingdom: Plantae
- Clade: Tracheophytes
- Clade: Angiosperms
- Clade: Eudicots
- Clade: Rosids
- Order: Sapindales
- Family: Rutaceae
- Genus: Citrus
- Species: C. halimii

Binomial name
- Citrus halimii B.C.Stone

Variety of tree

Citrus halimii, or mountain citron, is a citrus with sour fruit. Historically placed within the polyphyletic grouping of papedas, it has since been determined to be a wild species most closely related to the kumquats, and is not related to the true citron. It was first discovered and catalogued in 1973.

== Distribution ==
Citrus halimii is quite rare and poorly studied. After its initial 1973 discovery and description, it has been observed in only a handful of locations scattered across Southeast Asia: Thailand and Malaysia (the locations of the first discoveries), along with isolated stands in Indonesia.

== Description ==
Citrus halimii is a midsized evergreen tree, with a mature height of 20 to 25 feet (6.1 to 7.6 m); it is somewhat less thorny than other citrus. Like other papedas, the halimii has relatively large leaves, with a long, winged petiole.

The fruits of C. halimii are edible, but sour. They are round and small, measuring about 5–7 cm (2.0–2.8 in) in diameter. The rather thick rind eventually ripens to yellow or orange-yellow; internally the rind is tightly bound to the flesh. The yellow-green segments are filled with a number of large seeds, and a small quantity of juice.

== Taxonomy ==
Historically, limited characterization made appropriate taxonomic placement of the mountain citron unclear, with particular uncertainty over whether it was a natural hybrid or a pure wild species. Some phylogenies placed the mountain citron within Walter Tennyson Swingle's grouping of inedible citrus, the subgenus Papeda, but this grouping proved to be polyphyletic. A 2022 study of the genomics of the mountain papeda revealed it to have low levels of heterozygosity, consistent with it being a true citrus species and not a hybrid variety. Its genetic markers, along with the profile of its essential oils, showed it to be most closely related to kumquats.
