= Georges Eugène Charles Beauvisage =

French botanist and politician (1852–1925)

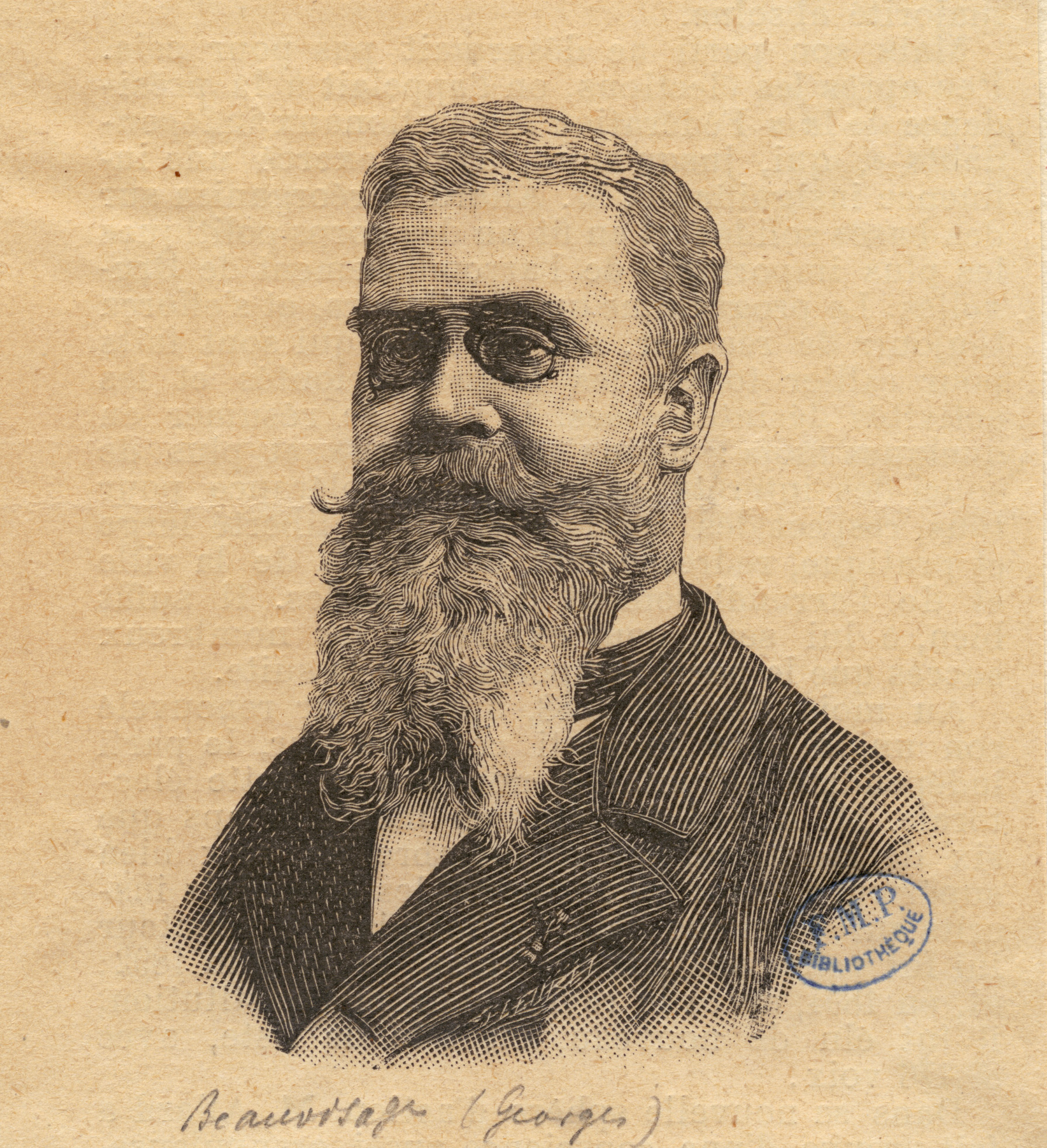
- Born: 29 January 1852; Paris
- Died: 8 April 1925 (aged 73); Lyon
- Occupations: botanist and politician

Georges Eugène Charles Beauvisage (29 January 1852, in Paris – 8 April 1925, in Lyon) was a French botanist and politician.

In 1881 he obtained his doctorate in medicine at Paris, followed by his bachelor of science degree during the following year. In 1883 he received his aggregation of natural history at the Faculty of Medicine and Pharmacy of Lyon, and in 1891 obtained his degree in pharmacy. In 1903 he became a professor at the University of Lyon.

In 1896 he began service as a councilor and as a deputy mayor in Lyon. In 1909 he was elected to the Senate from the department of Rhône. He was a member of the Gauche démocratique party.

As a botanist, he conducted extensive studies of Xavier Montrouzier's collections from New Caledonia. In 1890, Jean Baptiste Louis Pierre named the genus Beauvisagea (family Sapotaceae) in his honor.

== Selected writings ==
- Contribution à l'étude des origines botaniques de la gutta-percha, 1881 - Contribution to the study on the botanical origins of gutta-percha.
- Les galles utiles, 1883 (graduate thesis).
- Guide des étudiants en médecine et en pharmacie et des élèves herboristes au Jardin botanique de la Faculté de Lyon, 1892.
