= Orangelo =

Citrus fruit and plant

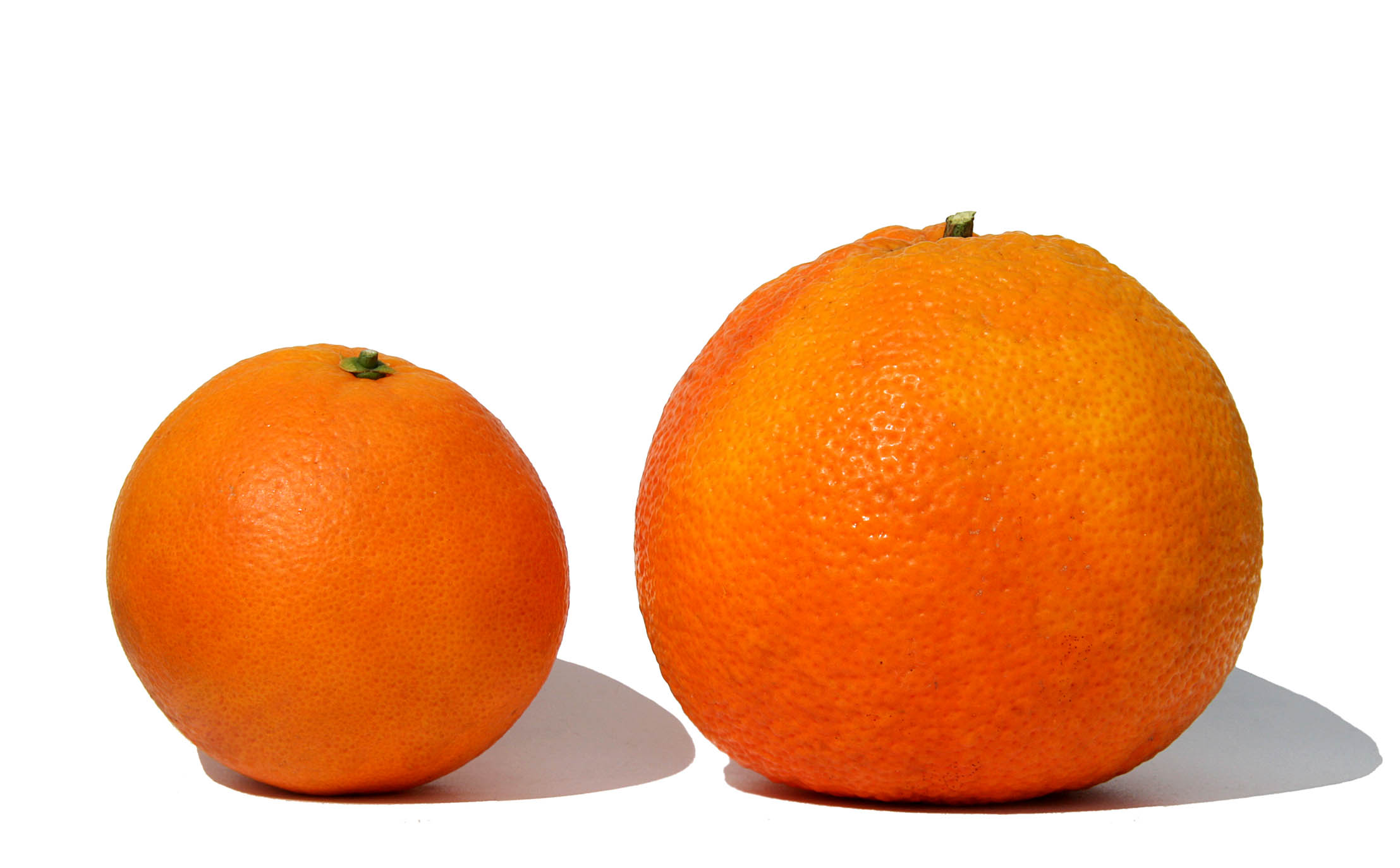
- An orangelo (right) compared to a smaller orange (left).
- Hybrid parentage: Citrus paradisi × Citrus sinensis
- Origin: Puerto Rico

An orangelo (Spanish chironja – C. paradisi × C. sinensis) is a hybrid citrus fruit originated in Puerto Rico. The fruit, a cross between a grapefruit and an orange, had spontaneously appeared in the shade-providing trees grown on coffee plantations in the Puerto Rican highlands.

In 1956, Carlos G. Moscoso, from the Horticulture, Agricultural Extension Service of the University of Puerto Rico noticed trees that grew fruits that were larger and a brighter yellow than those of the other trees on the plantations. Rootstock trials led to the development of the hybrid commonly known as the chironja. In Puerto Rican Spanish, the name is a portmanteau of orange (Puerto Rican Spanish: china) and grapefruit (toronja).

Orangelos are often eaten in the same manner as grapefruit (cut in half and eaten with a grapefruit spoon), but are sweeter and brighter in color than grapefruit, as well as being easier to peel. They are round to pear-shaped, with 9–13 segments.
