= Clymenia (plant) =

Scientific classification
- Kingdom: Plantae
- Clade: Embryophytes
- Clade: Tracheophytes
- Clade: Spermatophytes
- Clade: Angiosperms
- Clade: Eudicots
- Clade: Rosids
- Order: Sapindales
- Family: Rutaceae
- Subfamily: Aurantioideae
- Genus: Clymenia; Swingle & Tanaka.

Species
- See text

Genus of flowering plants

Clymenia is a small genus of flowering plants in the family Rutaceae with two species. The genus is often included in Citrus.

== Description ==
Clymenia forms a shrub or small tree, free of spines. Leaves feature a short, narrow petiole, which sets them apart from most other citrus, especially the papedas native to the same general area. Clymenia fruits are a small hesperidium, very similar to a citrus fruit. Sweet and lemony in flavor, the tangerine-sized fruits are highly segmented, with yellow pulp, and a leathery rind, similar to a true citrus fruit. They contain a large number of polyembryonic seeds. The fruit are eaten by the Bismarck islanders, who call it a-mulis (Namatanai).

Native to a handful of locations on Papua New Guinea and nearby islets, including New Ireland, New Britain and the Admiralty Islands, Clymenia is far more tropical than other citrus, and even in subtropical parts of the United States, it can only be grown in a greenhouse. Specimens thrived in greenhouses in Riverside, California, but perished when planted out in the arid climate. They are locally cultivated in indigenous villages, but have never been commercially cultivated.

== Taxonomy ==
Cultivated locally for its sweet fruits on a handful of southwestern Pacific islands, Clymenia was originally considered an obscure citrus hybrid. Botanist Tyôzaburô Tanaka noted that Clymenia would hybridize with a few other citrus plants (notably kumquats), but otherwise was generally different from other citrus in many aspects of its appearance. Botanist Walter Tennyson Swingle proposed moving Clymenia out of Citrus, circumscribing the genus in 1939, naming it after a figure from Greek mythology, Clymene, an Orchomenian princess who was the mother of Atalanta. Swingle assumed that Clymenia and citrus evolved from a single common ancestor. In 2000, Berhow suggested that a close relationship existed between Clymenia and kumquats and that it might be a Citrofortunella, a kumquat hybrid with another citrus.

Recent genomic analysis has shed new light on the phylogeny of Clymenia, potentially clarifying questions of its taxonomy. Clymenia polyandra was found to be completely homozygous, proving it to be a distinct species and not a kumquat hybrid. Clymenia clusters within the genus Citrus in a clade with the Australian and New Guinean limes, which though formerly placed in genera Eremocitrus and Microcitrus are now considered members of Citrus. Because excluding Clymenia would make Citrus paraphyletic, the Clymenia species may likewise belong in Citrus, with Clymenia relegated to the status of a subgenus. It is included in Citrus in a 2021 classification of the family Rutaceae.

=== Species ===
Species included in the genus:

- Clymenia platypoda B.C.Stone
- Clymenia polyandra (Tanaka) Swingle
