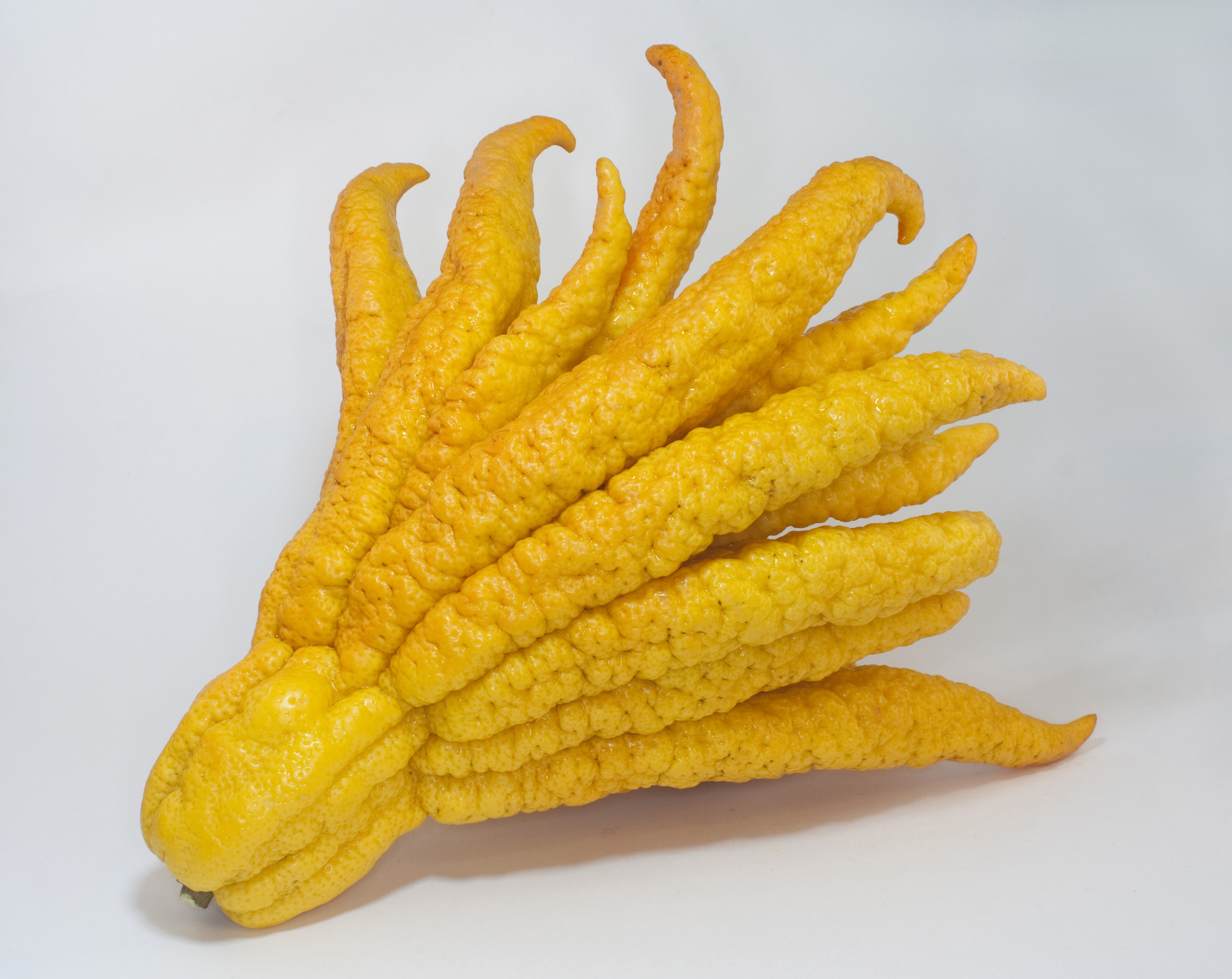
- Buddha's hand fruit, "open hand" appearance when ripe

Scientific classification
- Kingdom: Plantae
- (unranked): Angiosperms
- (unranked): Eudicots
- (unranked): Rosids
- Order: Sapindales
- Family: Rutaceae
- Genus: Citrus
- Species: C. medica
- Variety: C. m. var. sarcodactylis

Trinomial name
- Citrus medica var. sarcodactylis (Hoola van Nooten) Swingle

= Buddha's hand =

Variety of fruit

Buddha's hand

Chinese name
- Chinese: 佛手柑
Transcriptions
Standard Mandarin
- Hanyu Pinyin: fóshǒugān

Vietnamese name
- Vietnamese: quả phật thủ

Korean name
- Hangul: 불수감
- Hanja: 佛手柑
Transcriptions
- Revised Romanization: bulsugam

Japanese name
- Kanji: 仏手柑
- Hiragana: ぶっしゅかん
- Katakana: ブッシュカン
Transcriptions
- Revised Hepburn: busshukan

Citrus medica var. sarcodactylis, or the fingered citron, is a citron variety whose fruit is segmented into finger-like sections, resembling those seen on representations of the Buddha. It is called Buddha's hand in many languages including English, Hebrew, Chinese, Japanese, Korean, Vietnamese, German and French. Unlike other citrus fruits, it contains minimal pulp or juice, but has edible rind and pith.

The different cultivars and variations of this citron variety form a gradient from "open-hand" types with outward-splayed segments to "closed-hand" types, in which the fingers are kept together. There are also half-fingered fruits, in which the basal side is united and the apical side fingered. The origin of this kind of citron is commonly traced back to South or East Asia, probably northeastern India or China, where most domesticated citrus fruits originate.

== Description ==
Citrus medica var. sarcodactylis is, like any other citron variety, a shrub or small tree with long, irregular branches covered in thorns. Its large, oblong leaves are pale green and grow about four to six inches. Its white flowers are tinted purplish from the outside and grow in fragrant clusters. The fruit's fingers contain only the white pith of the fruit and sometimes a small amount of acidic pulp, but many of them are completely juiceless and some are seedless.

The plant is sensitive to frost, as well as intense heat and drought. It grows best in a temperate climate. Trees can be grown from cuttings taken from branches two to four years old. It is very commonly grafted onto sufficient rootstock.

It is susceptible to citrus greening disease (HLB).

== Uses ==
=== Perfumery ===
Buddha's hand fruit is very fragrant and is used predominantly in China and Japan for perfuming rooms and personal items such as clothing.

=== Religious ===
The fruit may be given as a religious offering in Buddhist temples. According to tradition, Buddha prefers the "fingers" of the fruit to be in a position where they resemble a closed rather than open hand, as closed hands symbolize the act of prayer. In China, the Buddha's hand is used as a symbol of happiness, longevity, and good fortune. It is also a traditional temple offering and a New Year's gift.

Whether a Buddha's hand is acceptable for liturgical use as an etrog on Sukkot was addressed in the 19th century by Rabbi Abdallah Somekh and his disciple, Rabbi Yosef Hayyim, both of Baghdad. The former was inclined to permit it, whereas the latter maintained that one may not use a variety of etrog in the absence of a positive tradition of its having been used.

=== Ornamental ===
The fingered citron is cultivated as an ornamental tree in gardens and containers on patios and terraces. In the United States, its unripe fruits have been sold under the trademark goblin fingers as a decorative Halloween novelty.

=== Food and medicine ===
Unlike other citrus fruits the Buddha's hand fruit contains no pulp or juice, just a yellow and fragrant edible rind, and edible pith. Though esteemed chiefly for its "exquisite form and aroma", the Buddha's hand fruit is eaten (often as a zest or flavouring) in desserts, savory dishes, and alcoholic beverages (such as vodka or rice liquor), or candied as a sweet. The sliced, dried peel of immature fruits is also prescribed as a tonic in traditional medicine.

== Gallery ==
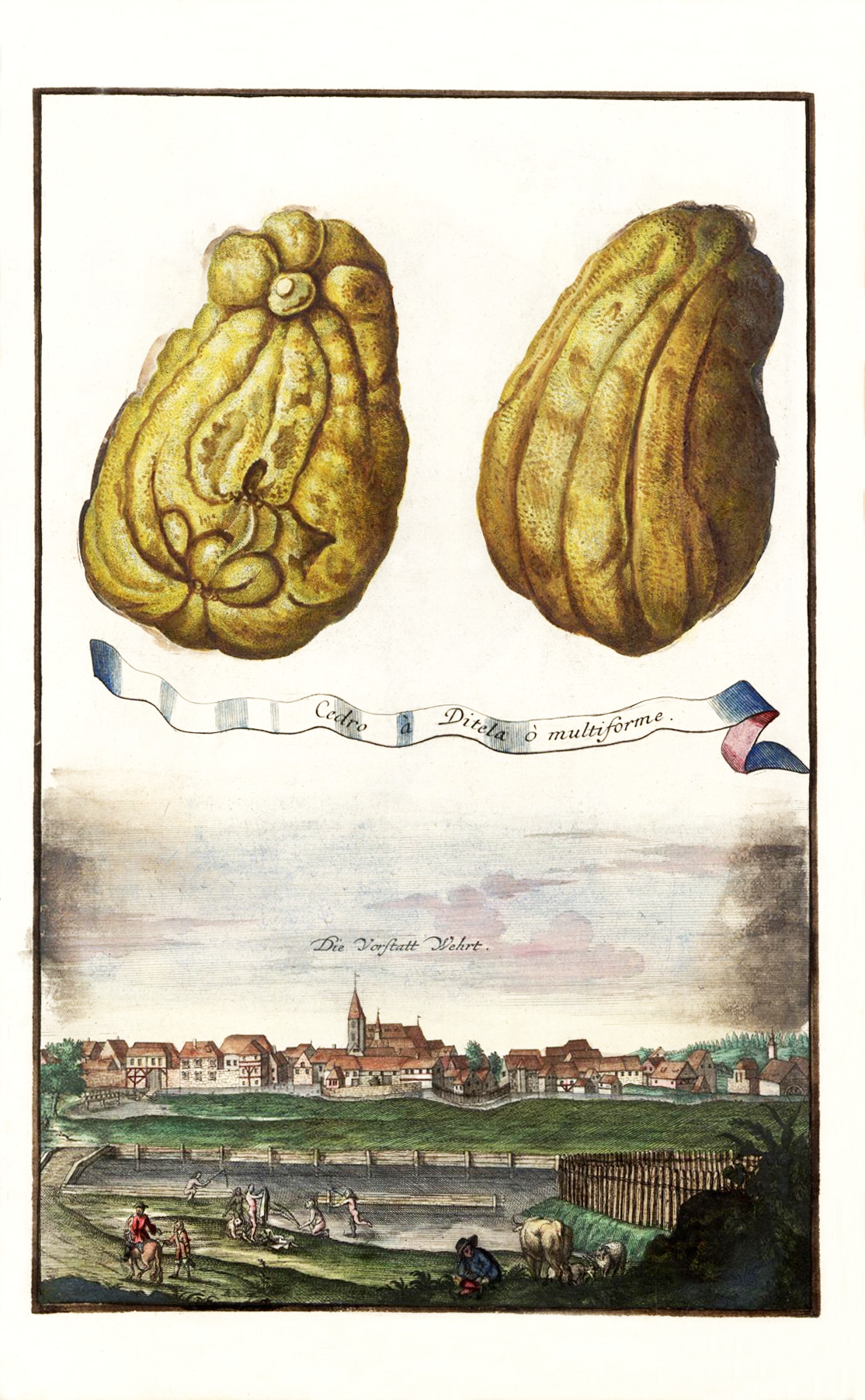
A fingered citron by Volckamer

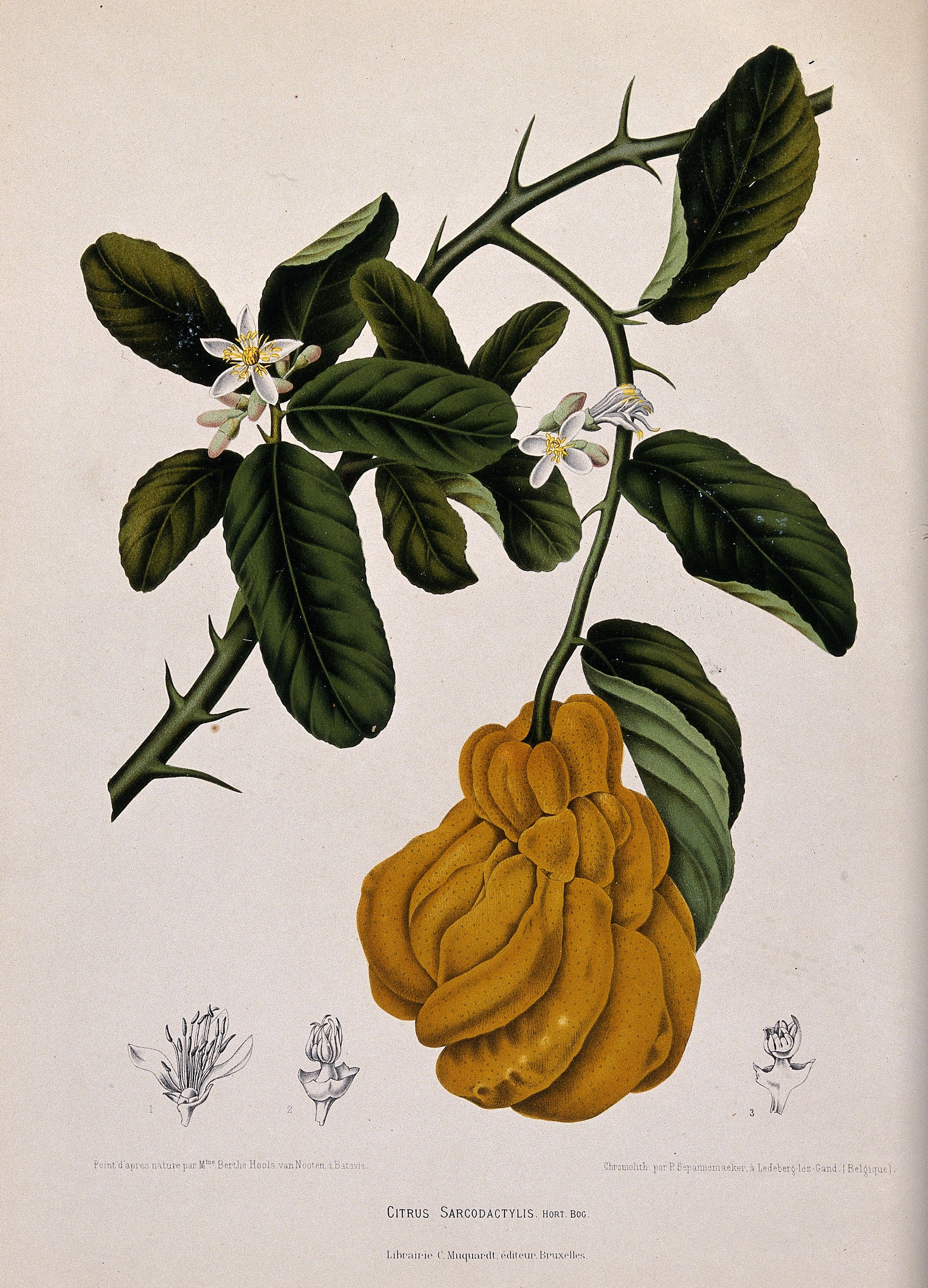
Fingered citron by Wellcome Trust

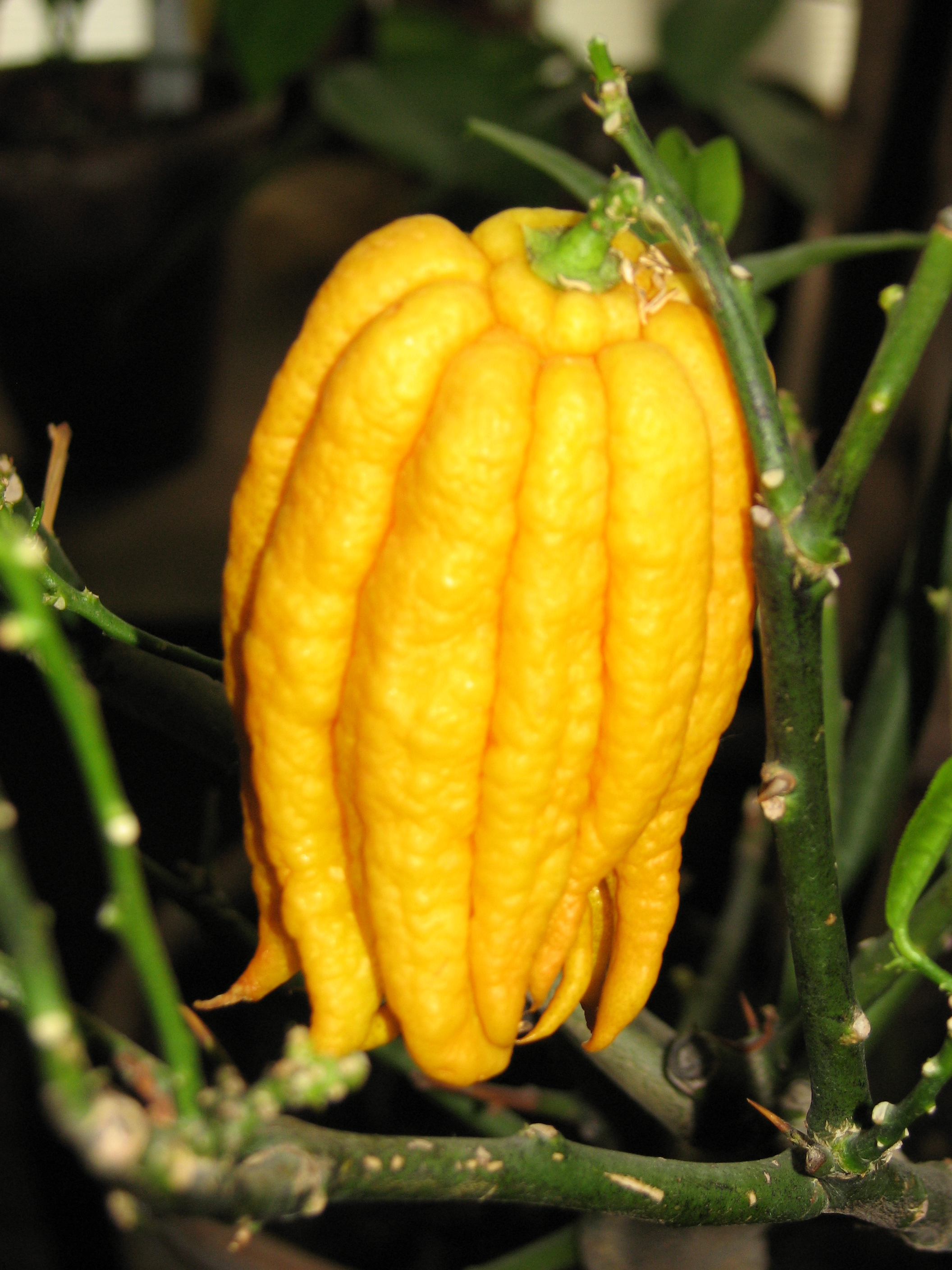
Huge fruit breaking bearing twig

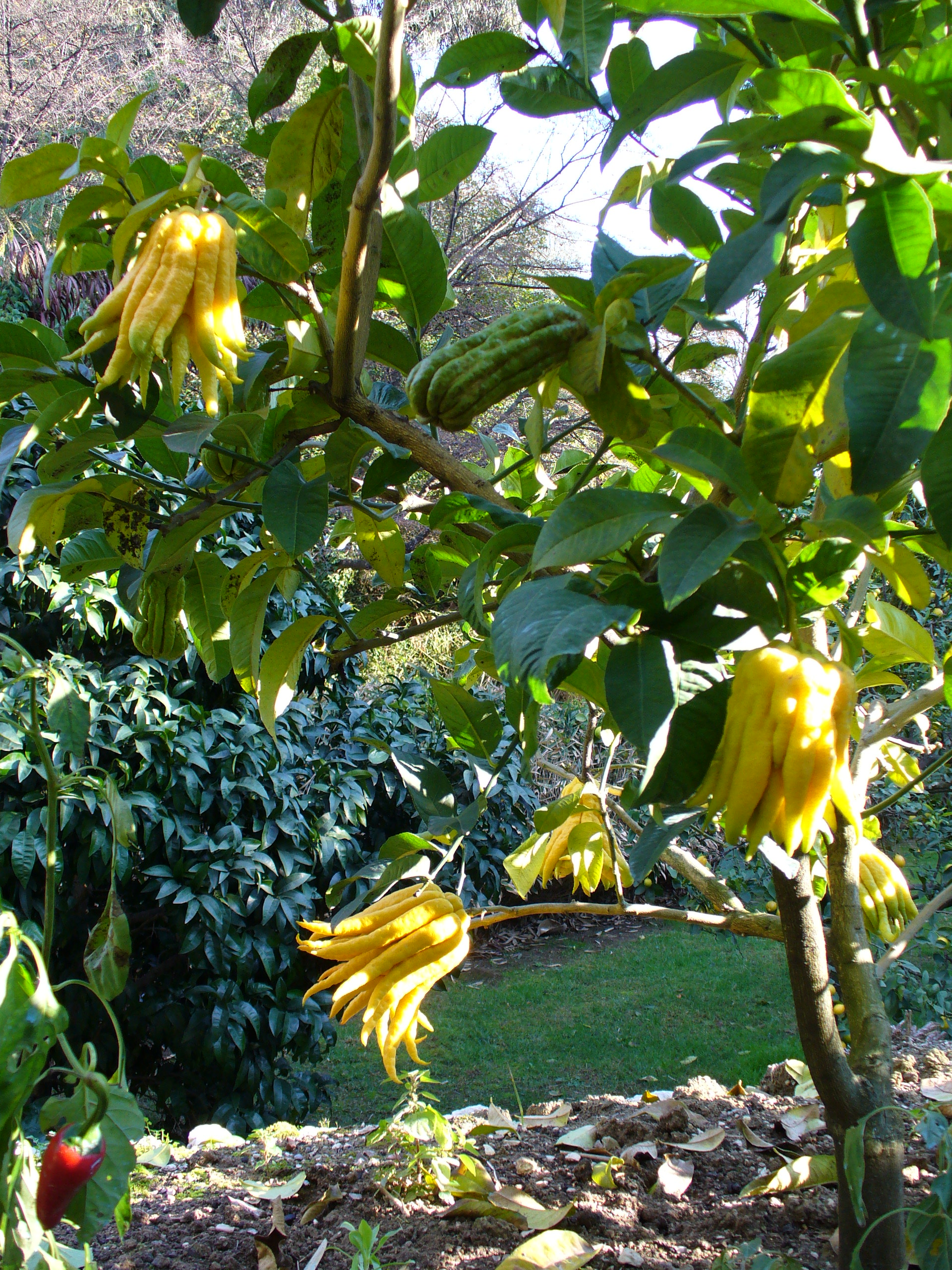
Buddha's hand citron in Val Rahmeh botanical garden

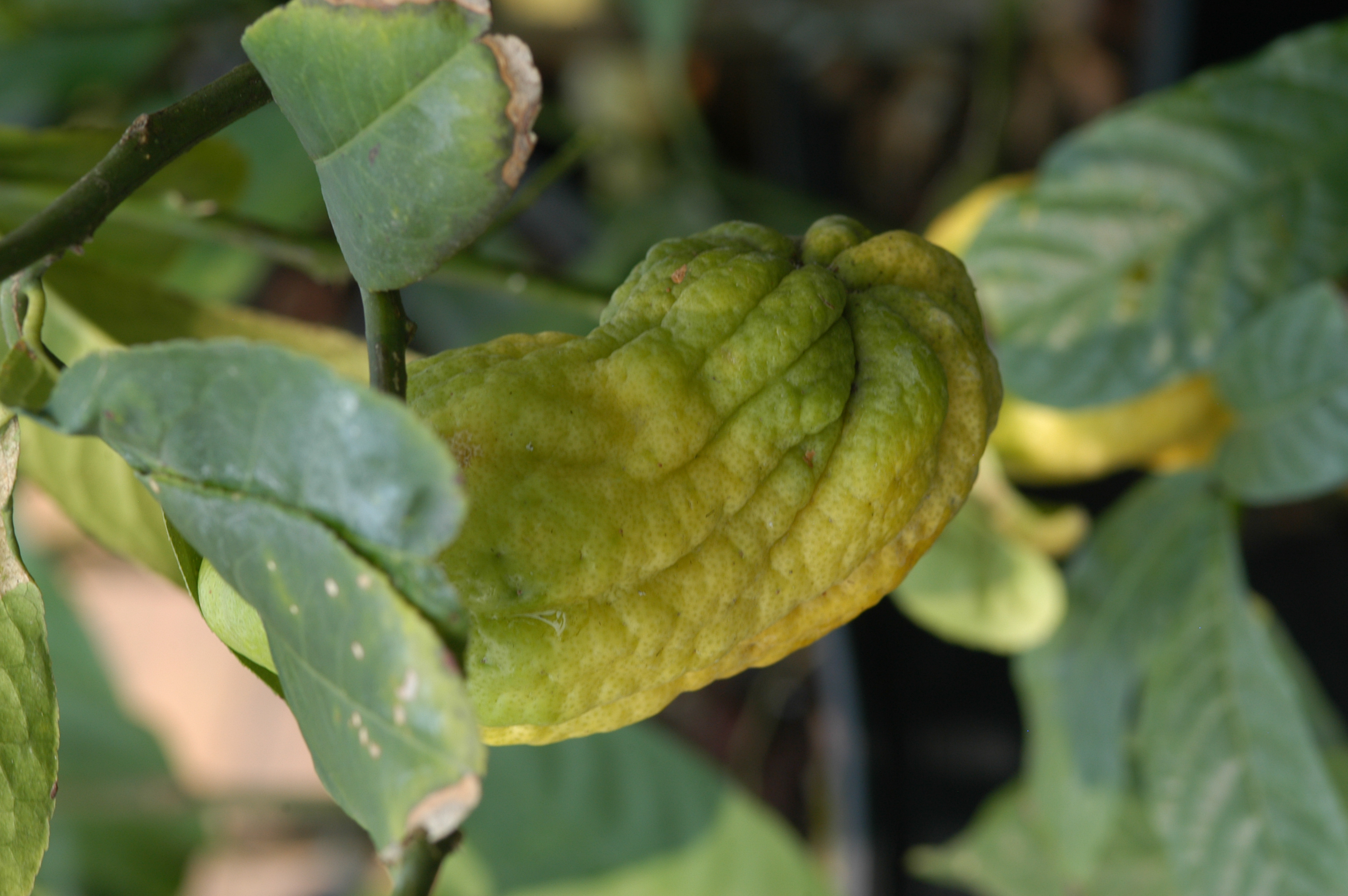
Semi-fingered and closed

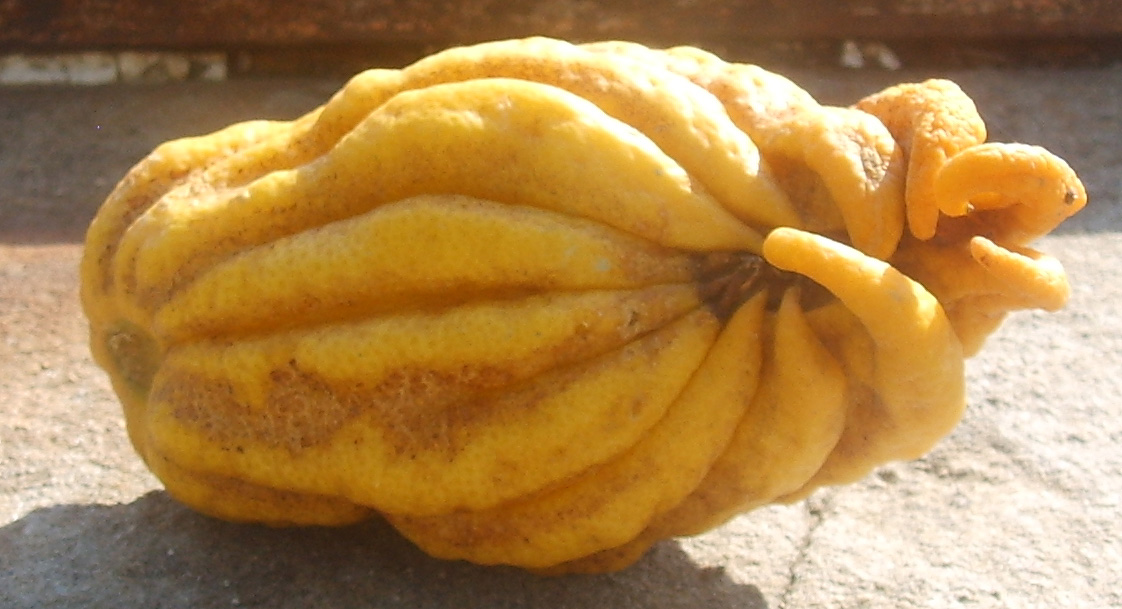
Closed fingers

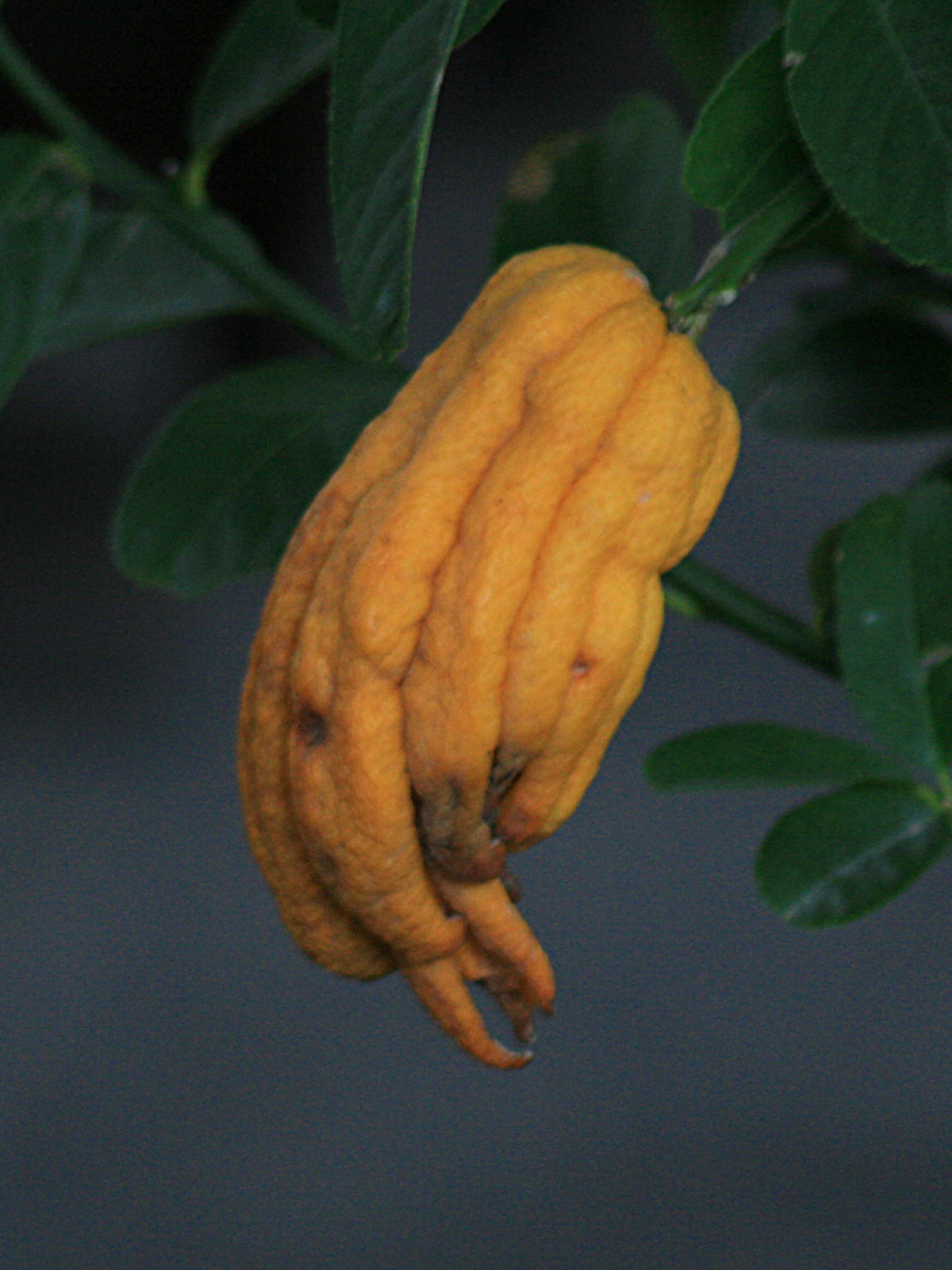
Side view

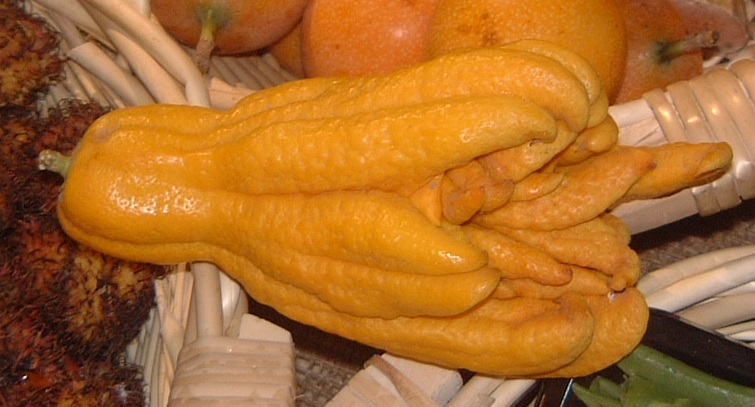
A fingered citron

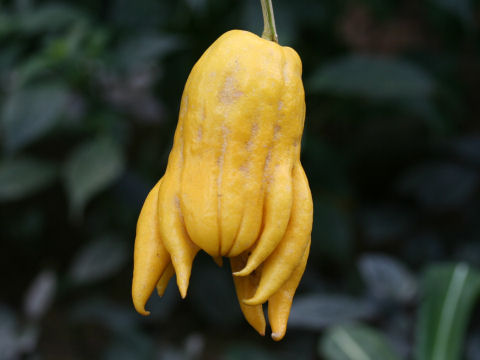
Semi-closed fingers

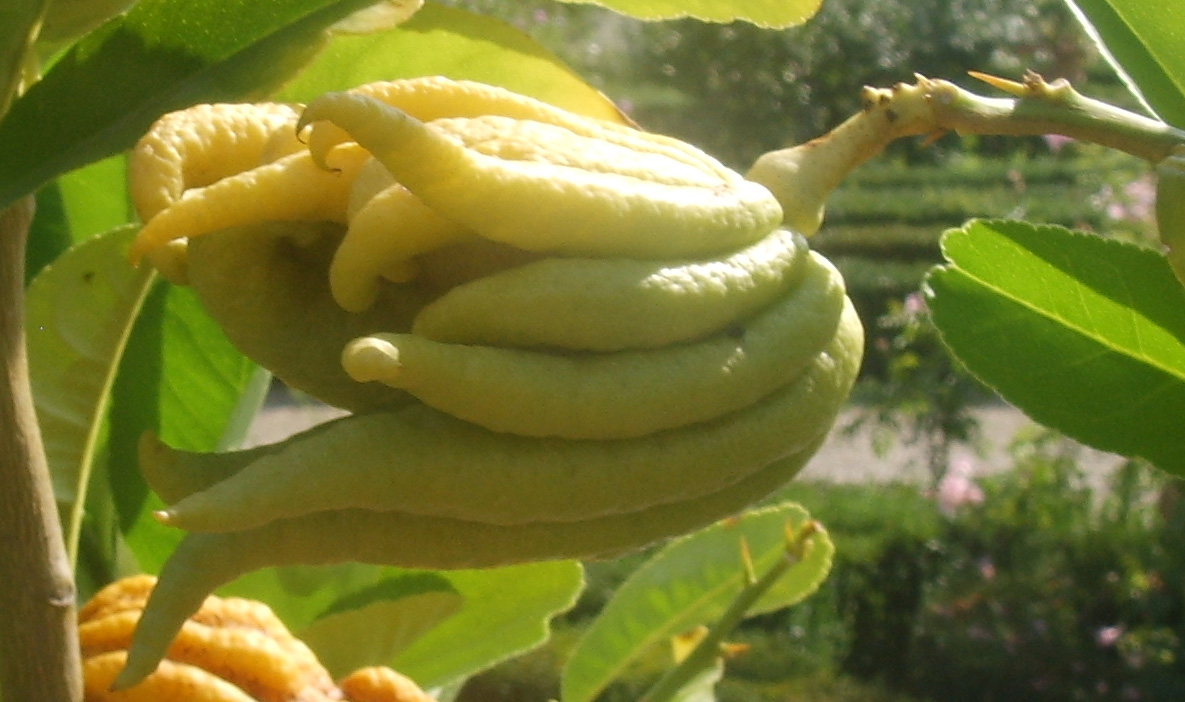
In Villa di Castello

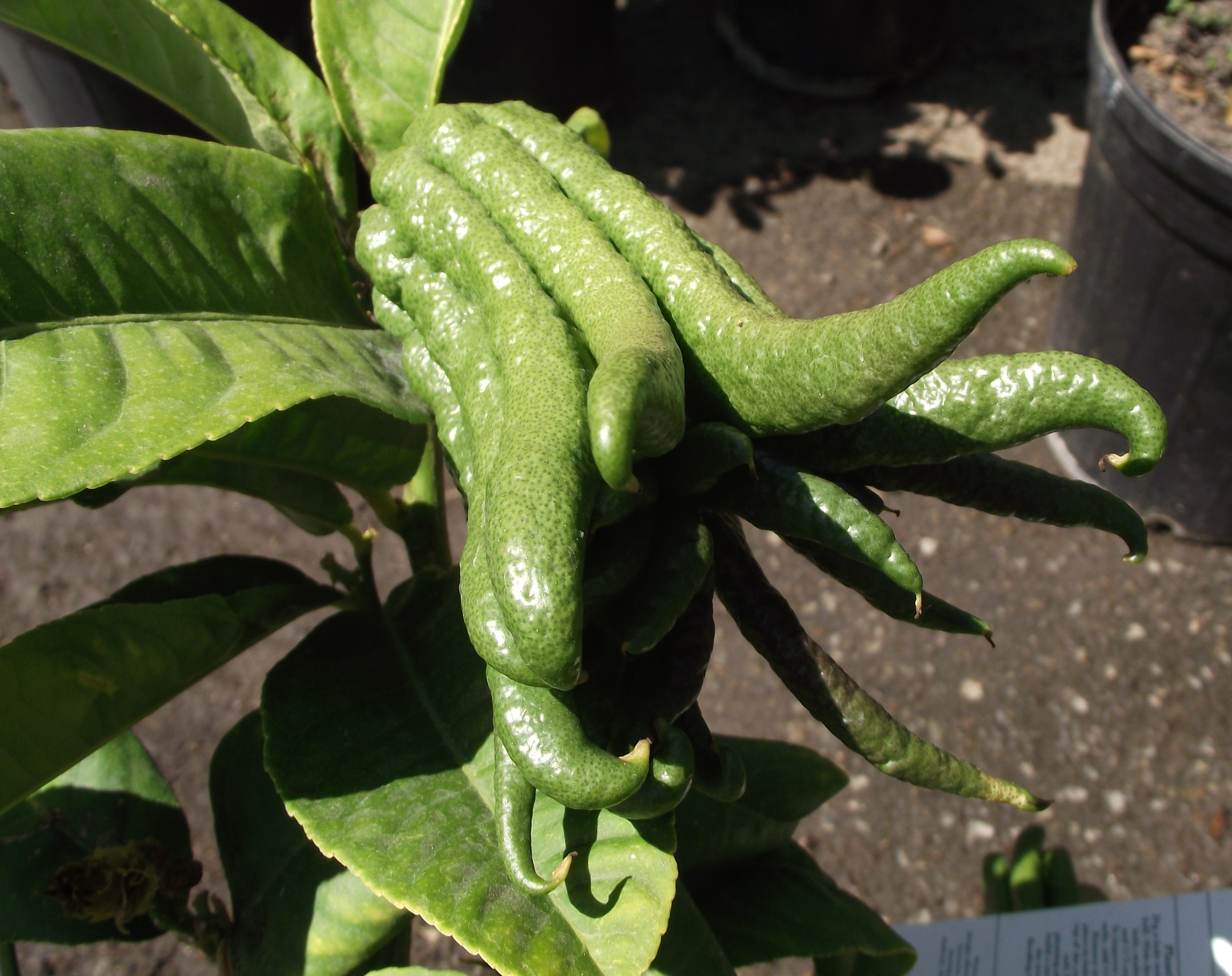
Semi dwarf fingered citron (green)

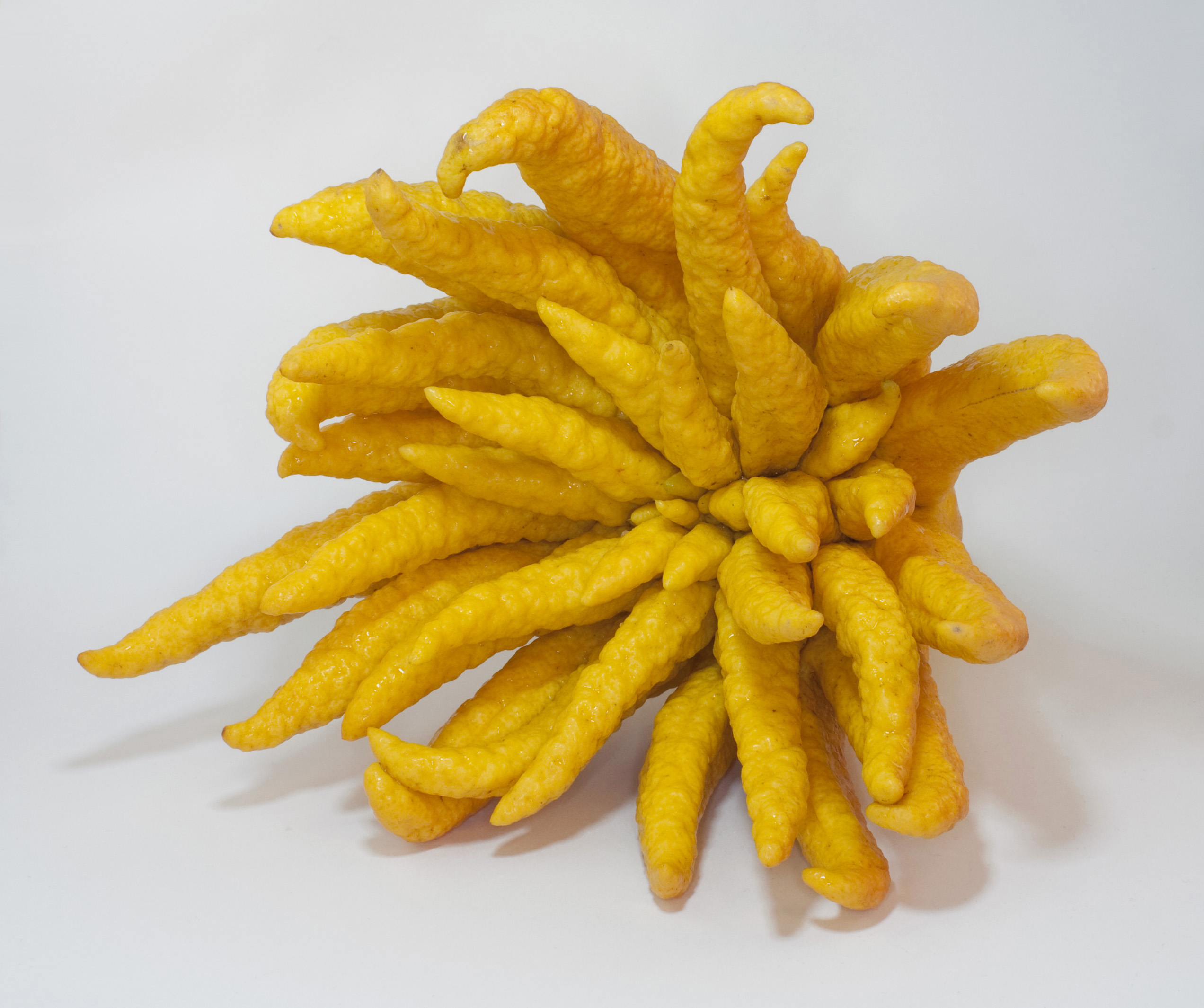
With open fingers

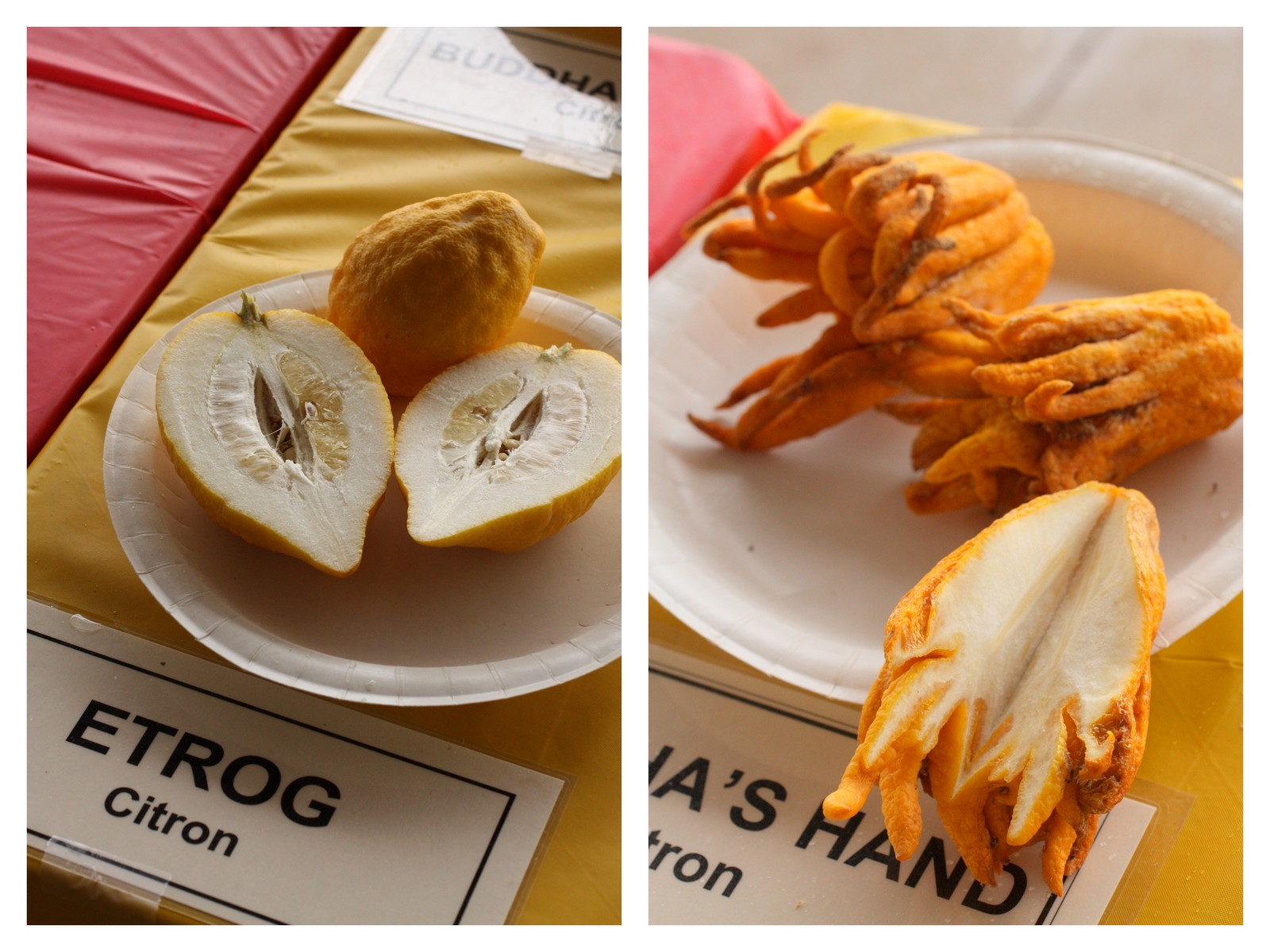
Cross section in a Variety etrog citron, and in fingered citron

== See also ==
- Japanese citrus
