= Chōzaburō Tanaka =

Japanese botanist (1885–1976)

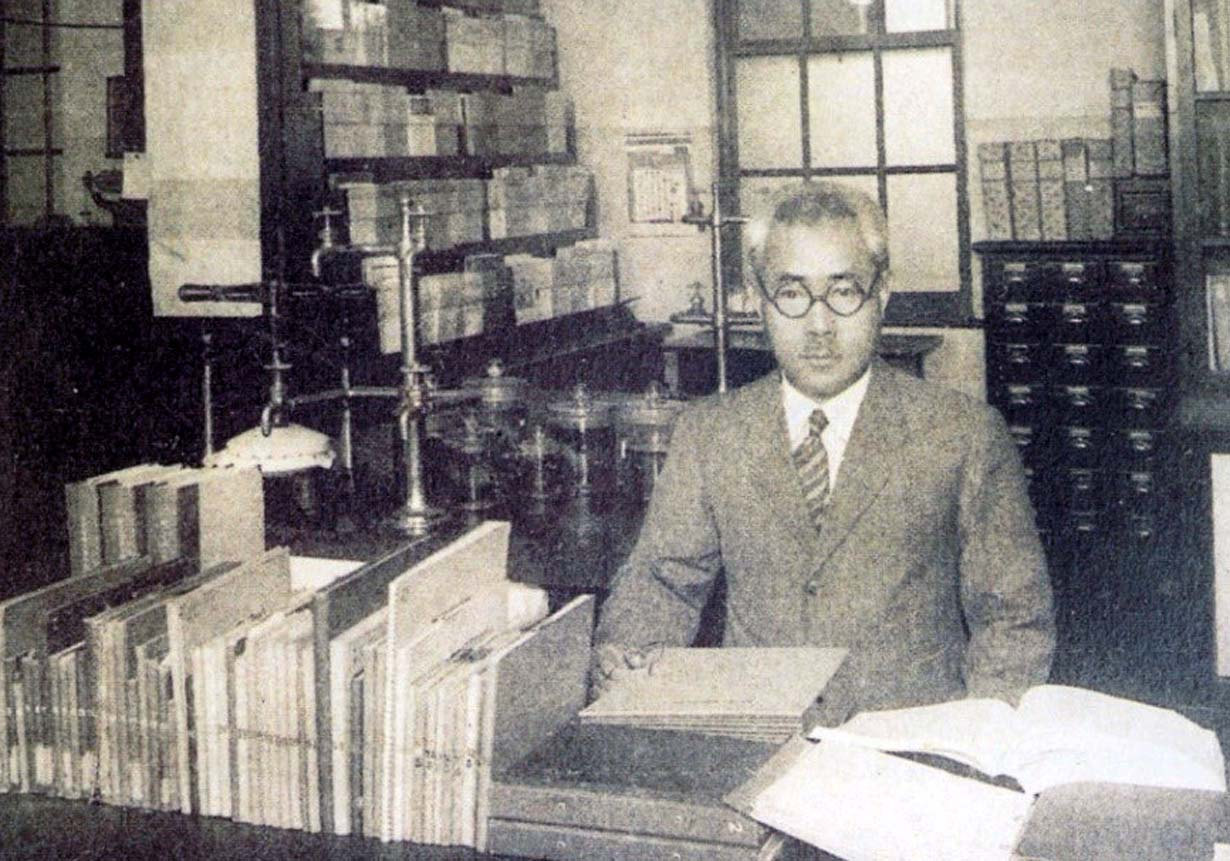
- Born: November 3, 1885; Osaka
- Died: June 28, 1976 (aged 90)
- Citizenship: Japan
- Known for: Citrus taxonomy (Tanaka system)
- Scientific career
- Author abbrev. (botany): Tanaka

Chōzaburō Tanaka (田中 長三郎, Tanaka Chōzaburō), often Romanized as Tyôzaburô Tanaka (November 3, 1885 in Osaka – June 28, 1976), was a Japanese botanist and mycologist. He established one of the two major taxonomic classification systems for citrus and related genera currently in use, and is now considered to be a taxonomic "splitter". He is the author of 180 botanical names in the citrus family Rutaceae, including for example Citrus × latifolia (Persian lime) and Citrus tangerina (tangerine). Many of the species Tanaka described are still recognized, but his overall scheme is not supported by modern genetic research. With Yaichi Shimada, Tanaka issued and distributed specimens in a numbered series resembling an exsiccata under the title Flora of Taiwan. Collected and distributed by Prof. T. Tanaka and Y. Shimada.

== Works ==
- Tanaka, Tyôzaburô (1976). Nakao, Sasuke (ed.). Tanaka's Cyclopedia of Edible Plants of the World (first ed.). Tokyo: Yugaku-sha (distributed by Keigaku Pub. Co.).
- Tanaka, Tyôzaburô (1932). A Monograph of the Satsuma Orange. Taihoku Imperial University.

== See also ==
- Citrus hybrids
