= Sport (botany) =

Plant part that is different from the rest

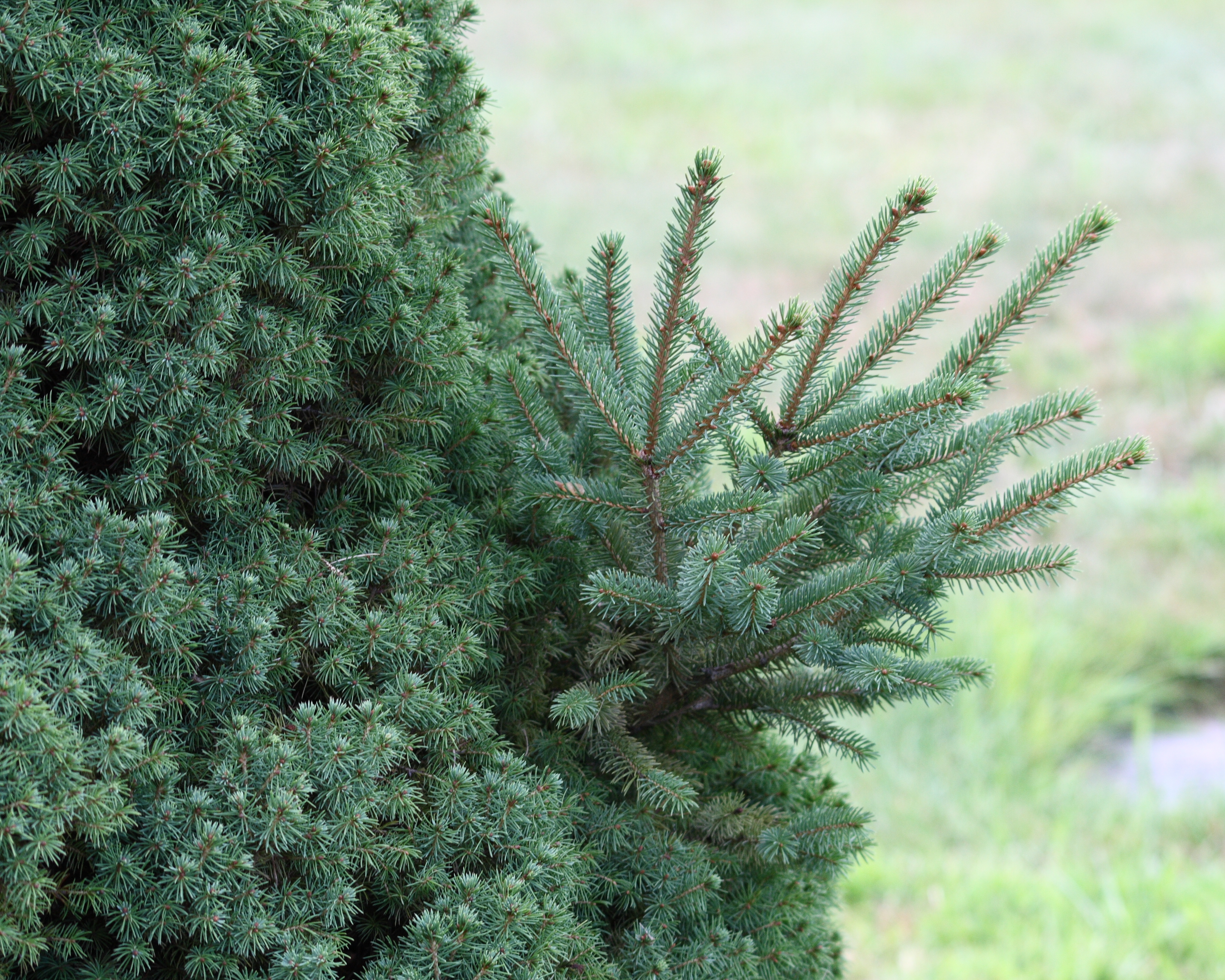
Foliage of a dwarf Alberta spruce (Picea glauca var. albertiana 'Conica'), with a branch showing reversion to the normal Alberta white spruce growth habit of larger leaves and longer internodes.

In botany, a sport or bud sport, traditionally called lusus, is a part of a plant that shows morphological differences from the rest of the plant. Sports may differ by foliage shape or color, flowers, fruit, or branch structure. The cause is generally thought to be chance genetic mutations in a single cell. Sports may also arise from stable changes in gene expression due to epigenetic modifications, including histone modification, DNA methylation, chromatin remodeling and RNA silencing. If the clonal descendants of a modified cell eventually form a meristem that gives rise to new plant parts, those may be of a new phenotype. Often only part of the meristem cells are affected, resulting in genetic chimerism in such sports.

== Horticulture ==
Sports with desirable characteristics may be grown into new plants by vegetative reproduction and are often propagated as new cultivars that retain the characteristics of the new morphology. Such selections are often prone to "reversion", meaning that part or all of the plant reverts to its original form.

An example of a bud sport is the nectarine, at least some of which developed as a bud sport from peaches. Other common fruits resulting from a sport mutation are the red Anjou pear, the Cara Cara orange, the Ruby Red grapefruit, and the variegated pink lemon, which is a sport of the "Eureka" lemon.

The use of spontaneous mutations in plant breeding may avoid certain challenges associated with breeding by sexual recombination, like heterozygosity and sexual incompatibilities. Since usually only (very) few alleles are affected, most of the traits of the original cultivar are retained.

== See also ==
- Mosaic (genetics)
- Macapuno, also called "coconut sport", a mutation that is, however, not necessarily a sport
