= Lemonade (disambiguation) =

Lemonade is a drink made with lemons.

Lemonade may also refer to:

== Food and drinks ==
- Lemon-Lime soft drinks, referred to as "Lemonade" in Australia and New Zealand
- Lemonade fruit, a hybrid citrus fruit found in Australia and New Zealand
- Red lemonade, soft drink available in Ireland

== Music ==
- Lemonade (band), an alternative dance band from San Francisco, California

=== Albums ===
- Lemonade (album), by Beyoncé, 2016
- Lemonade (Mucky Pup album), 1992
- Lemonade (EP), a 2004 EP by Wheatus
- Lemonade (G. Love album), 2006
- Lemonade (Aespa album), 2026

=== Songs ===
- "Lemonade" (Adam Friedman song), 2016
- "Lemonade" (Aespa song), 2026
- "Lemonade" (Alexandra Stan song), 2012
- "Lemonade" (CocoRosie song), 2010
- "Lemonade" (Danity Kane song), 2014
- "Lemonade" (Gucci Mane song), 2010
- "Lemonade" (Internet Money, Gunna and Don Toliver song), 2020
- "Lemonade" (Sophie song), 2014
- "Lemonade" (Forrest Frank and The Figs song), 2025
- "Lemonade", a song and single by Chris Rice from album What A Heart Is Beating For, 2007
- "Lemonade", a song by Blind Melon from album Soup
- "Lemonade", a song by Boys Noize & Erol Alkan
- "Lemonade", a song by Skylar Grey from album Natural Causes
- "Lemonade", a song by Planet Funk
- "Lemonade", a song by Pure, 1995

== Plays and films ==
- Lemonade, a play by Eve Ensler
- Lemonade, a play by James Prideaux
- Lemonade (2016 film), a musical film released alongside Beyoncé's Lemonade album
- Lemonade (2018 film), a Romanian drama
- Lemonade (2026 film), an Irish drama

== Companies ==
- Lemonade, Inc., an insurance company operating in the U.S. and Europe
- Lemon8

== See also ==
- Lemonade Profile, an extension to the IMAP standard for email
- Lemonade Tycoon, an online business simulation game
- Keith Lemon's Lemonaid, a British television series
- Lemoned Plant, formerly simply Lemoned, a Japanese record label and retail store franchise
- Ramune, a Japanese soft drink
- Lamune (visual novel), a Japanese romantic video game and anime
