= Lemonade fruit =

Citrus fruit and plant

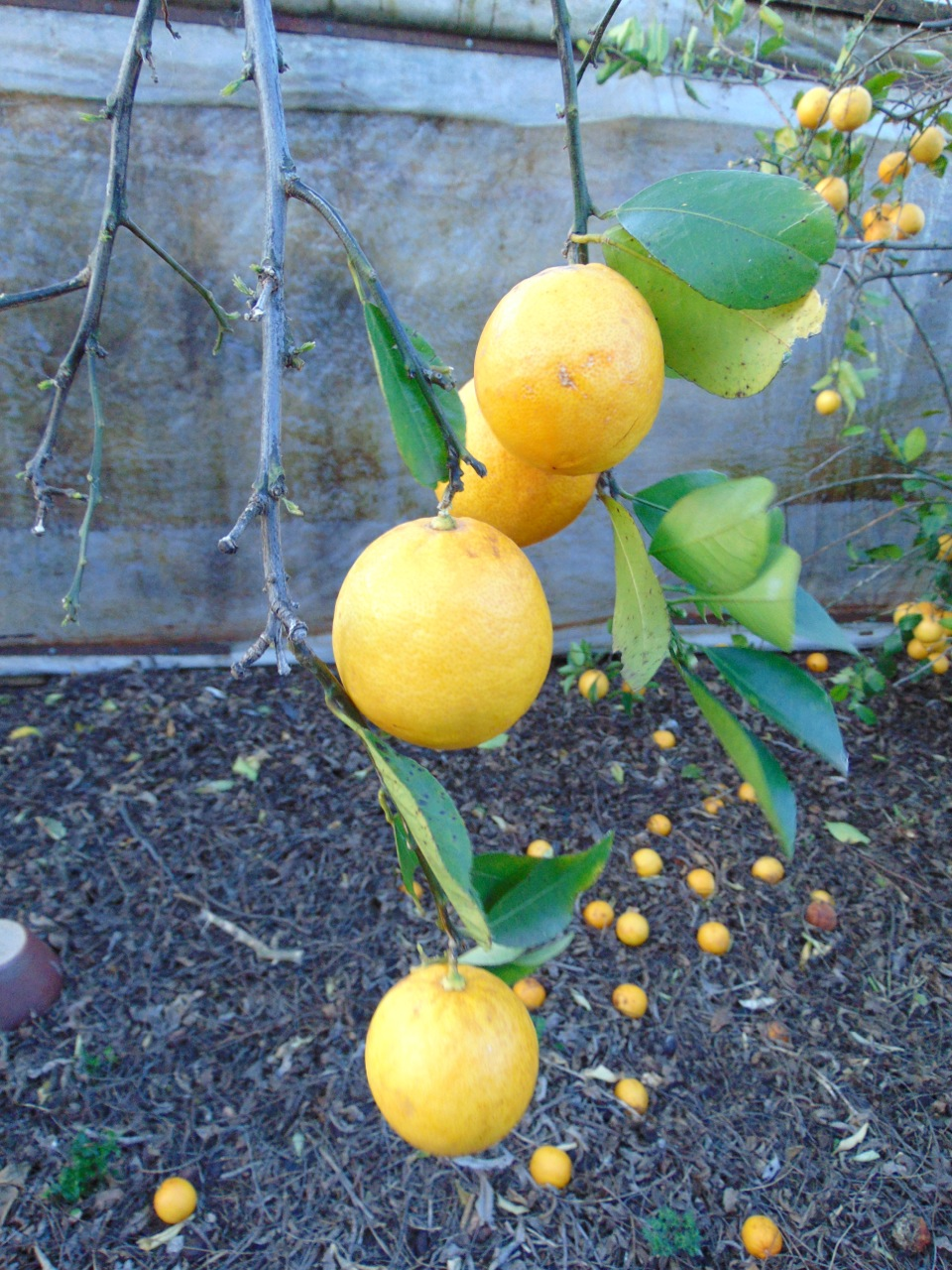
- Genus: Citrus
- Hybrid parentage: Citrus limon × Citrus reticulata
- Cultivar: Citrus limon x reticulata
- Origin: New Zealand

Lemonade fruit (Citrus limon x reticulata), otherwise known as lemonade lemon, New Zealand lemonade or unlemon is a variety of sweet lemon citrus fruit, believed to be a hybrid between a mandarin orange and a lemon.

It was first discovered in New Zealand in the 1980s as a chance seedling, and is grown principally in the warmer parts of the country. The lemonade fruit is grown widely in Australia. It is also cultivated in the Central Valley of California and Florida in the United States.

== Description ==
The fruit resembles that of a lemon, but round instead of ellipsoidal, ranging between 7 and 10 cm in diameter. The smooth rind is yellow when ripe and can be peeled by hand. The flesh resembles the lemon in taste, but sweeter with some acidity, containing 9 to 11 segments with few to no seeds. It is not to be confused with the Meyer lemon.

== See also ==
- Sweet lime
