= Lumia (citrus) =

Citrus hybrid

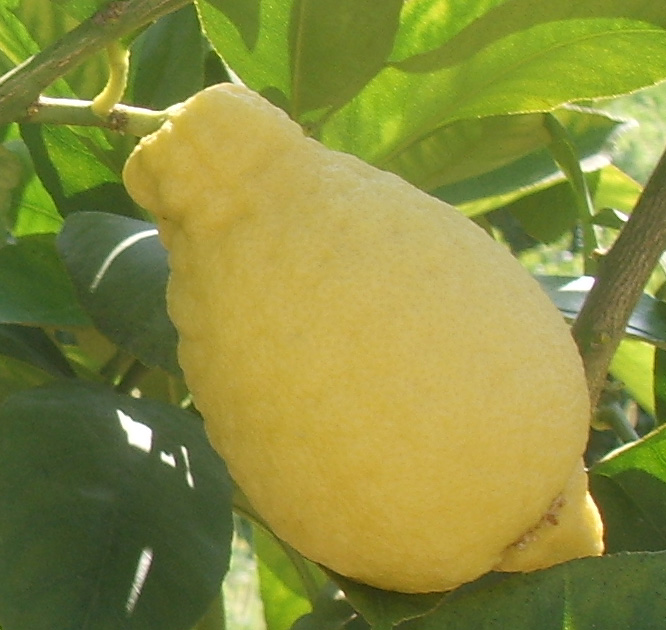
- Species: Citrus × lumia Risso & Poit.
- Cultivar: 'Lumia'

The lumia (Citrus lumia Risso. & Poit., or Citrus aurantiifolia (Christm. et Panz.) Swingle var. lumia hort.) is also called the pear lemon (Citrus × lumia 'pyriformis'), since its shape resembles a pear. It is also called French lime and sometimes sweet lemon, even though it is not necessarily sweet.

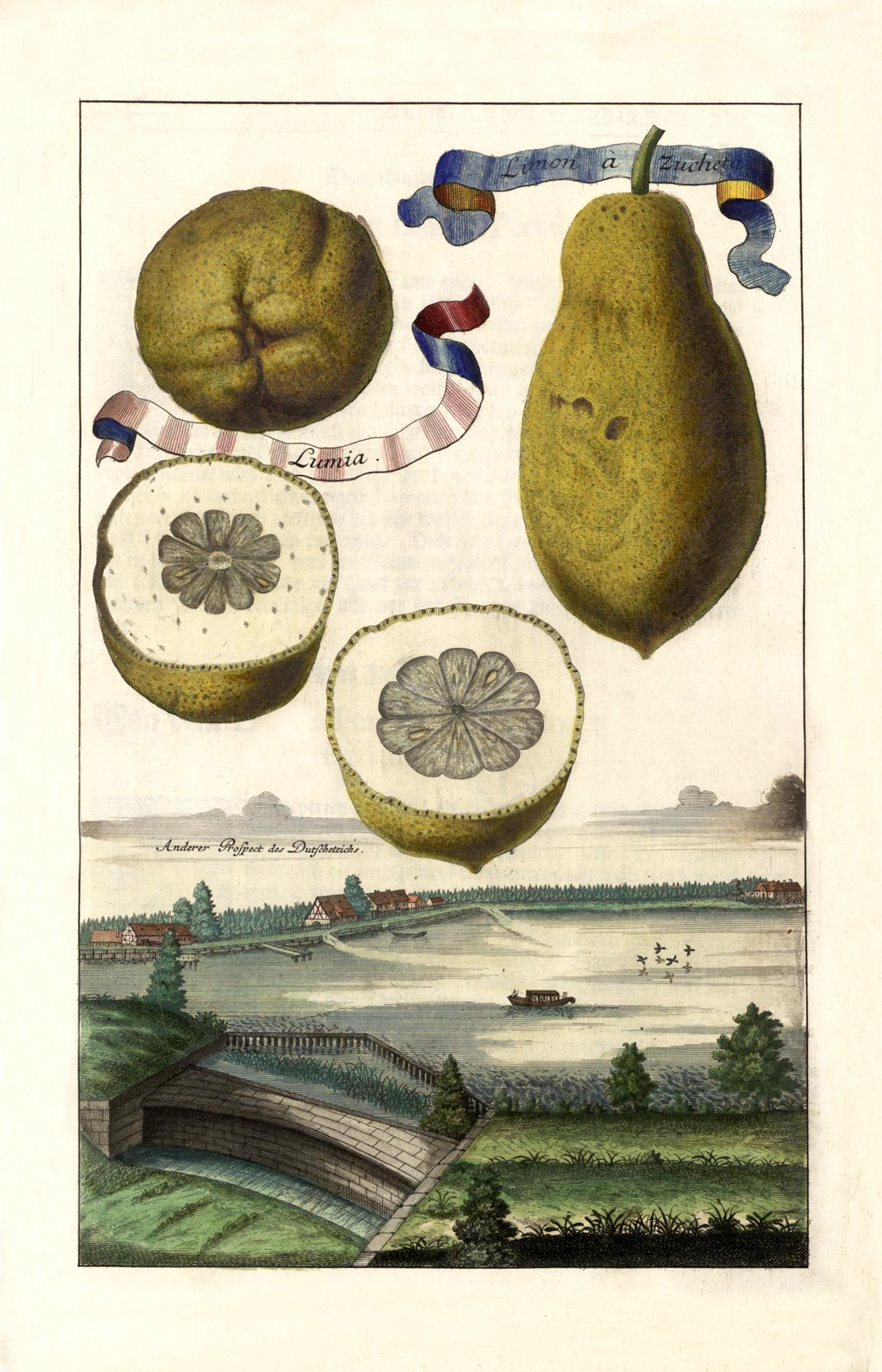
The Lumia by Johann Christoph Volkamer is described as a sweet lemon.

In German, the lumia is called Birnenlimone, Patriarch-Citrone, Süsse Limone or Birnenlumie; in French it is called Poire du commandeur. In Chinese, it is called Lu mi (露蜜), in Japanese Rumii (ル ミー), Vietnamese Chanh Pháp.

The fruit resembles a pear in shape, has a thick peel and is not very juicy. Like a citron, it can grow to a formidable size.

== Pomum Adami ==
There is a variety of Lumia called Pomme d'Adammo or Adam's apple, and is also included under the name Citrus lumia; according to Risso & Poit, the variety name is pomum adami.

== Origin and genetics ==
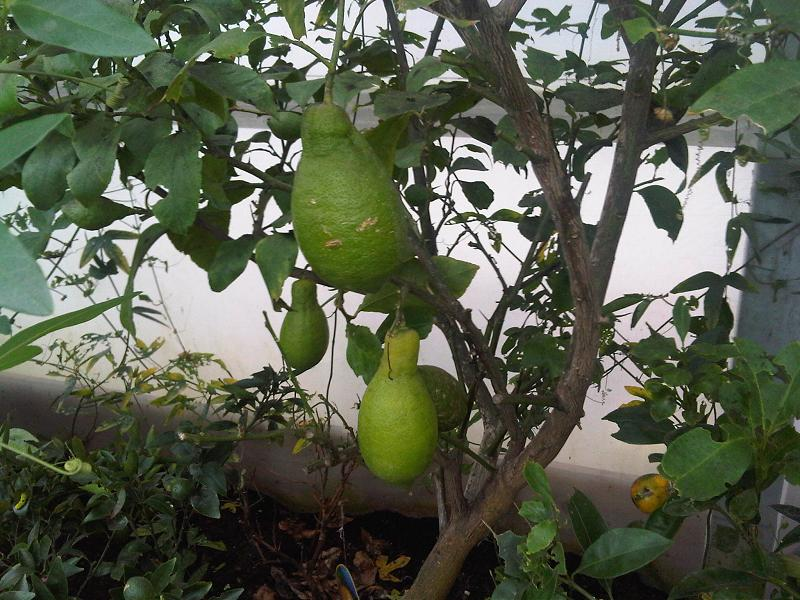
Developing fruit

The most likely origin for the lumia is the Mediterranean basin. The Lumia is also classified as Citrus limon var. lumia by Walter Tennyson Swingle which places it under the taxonomy of lemon, and Citrus medica L. var. lumia, that suggests it is similar to citron.

Lumias represent several distinct citrus hybrids. Usually lumias are referred to as a citron hybrid, because of their size, thick peel and dryness of pulp. Pomo d'Adamo was also described by Johann Christoph Volkamer as a Cedrato which is Italian for a citron hybrid, whilst Cedro refers to a true citron.

A recent genomic analysis of several species commonly called "lemons" or "limes" revealed that the various individual lumias have different genetic backgrounds. The 'Hybride Fourny' was found to be an F1 hybrid of a citron-pomelo cross, while the 'Jaffa lemon' was a more complex cross between the two species, perhaps an F2 hybrid. The Pomme d'Adam arose from a citron-micrantha cross, while two other lumias, the ‘Borneo’ and ‘Barum’ lemons, were found to be citron-pomelo-micrantha mixes.

In The Citrus Industry, Hodgson wrote of the lumias:

There are numerous fruits in which citron characters are strongly pronounced. The lumias of the Mediterranean basin are natural hybrids in which acid citron or lemon and pummelo characters are evident. According to Chapot (1950a), they are characterized by fruits of large size, commonly somewhat pyriform, with highly acid flesh of greenish color, large purple-tinged flowers, and young shoots that are pubescent and purple-tinted. Chapot states that the principal clonal varieties are "Poire du Commandeur", "Citron de Borneo" (Chapot, 1964d), and "Pomme d'Adam". They are of ancient and unknown origin, presumably Italian, and are grown only as curiosities or ornamentals.

== Medicine ==
According to a Japanese study of 1996, the albedo extract of the Lumia, was shown to possess the highest inhibitory activity against cyclooxygenase (IC50 = 24 μg/mL), among other citrus studied. Flavedo extract of ripe Lumia inhibited cyclooxygenase to the same degree as the albedo, more than the pulp extract.

== Sources ==
- Citrus Pages
- Citrus Variety Collection website
- USDA page
- Zitrusgarten
- Agrumes Baches
- Tintory Citrus Plants
- Good Photo of Lumia
