= Sweet lemon =

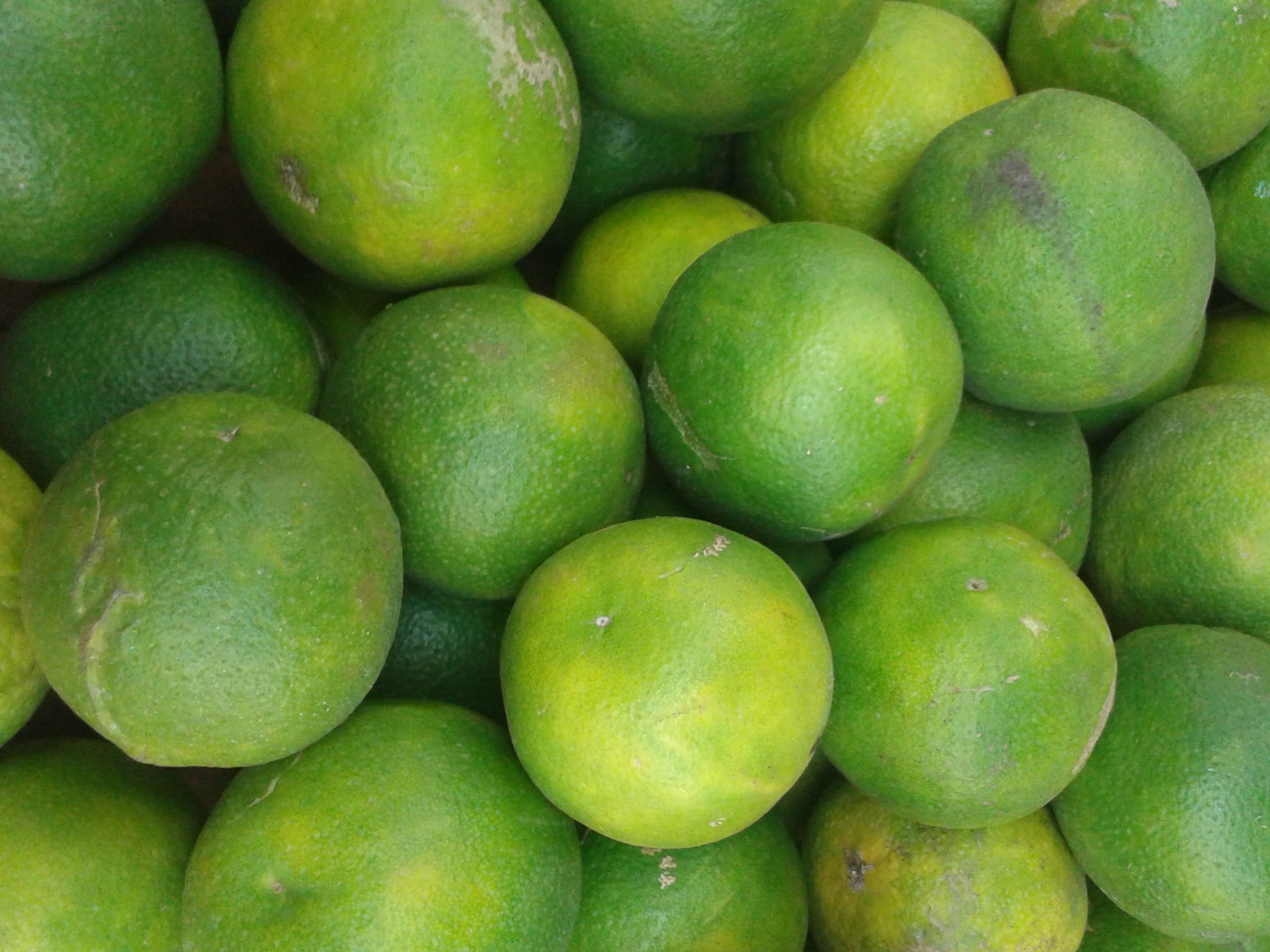
The Limetta

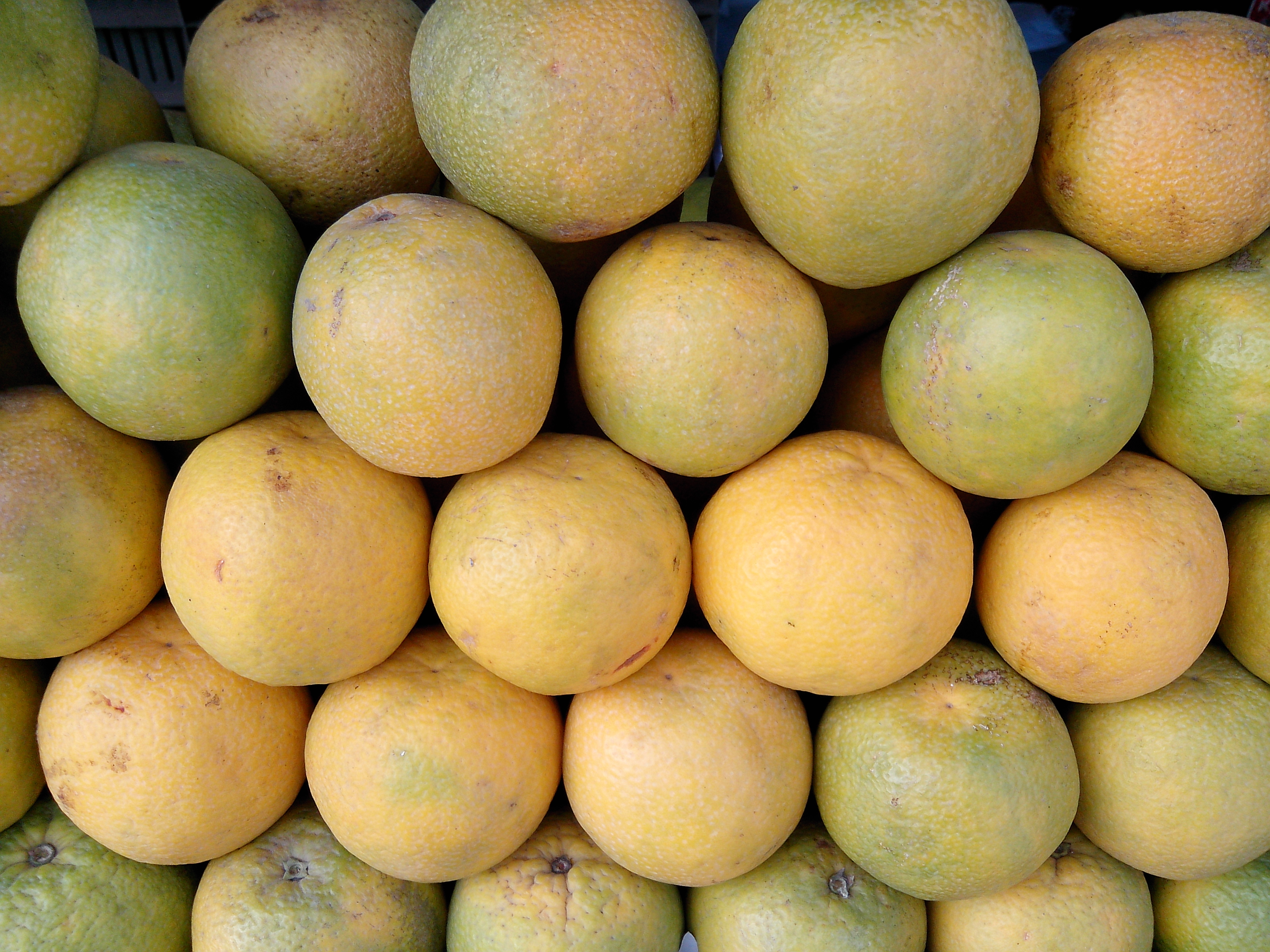
Sweet limes of Salem

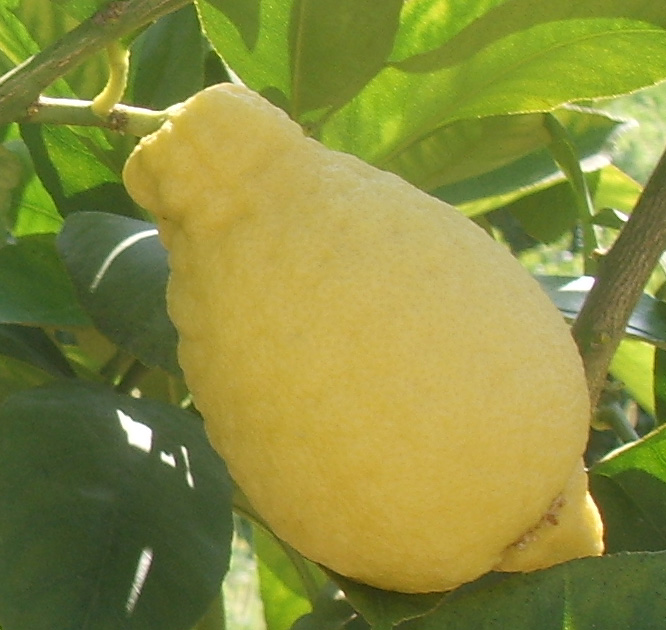
The Lumia

Sweet lemon and sweet lime refer to groups of citrus hybrids that contain low acid pulp and juice. They are hybrids often similar to non-sweet lemons or limes, but with less citron parentage. Sweet limes and lemons are not sharply separated:

The sweet lime, Citrus limettioides Tan. (syn. C. lumia Risso et Poit.), is often confused with the sweet lemon, C. limetta Tan., (q.v. under LEMON) which, in certain areas, is referred to as "sweet lime". In some of the literature, it is impossible to tell which fruit is under discussion.

The same plant may also be known by different names:

The Indian sweet lime is the mitha nimbu (numerous modifications and other local names) of India, the limûn helou or succari of Egypt, and the Palestine sweet lime (to distinguish it from the Millsweet and Tunisian limettas, commonly called sweet limes).

The sweet lemons and sweet limes are not derived from either lemons or the more common limes, nor do they represent a monophyletic grouping, having arisen from distinct citrus hybridizations. Plants and fruits with the common name sweet lemon or sweet lime include:

- Citrus limetta, small and round like a common lime, with sweet juice, a citron/sour orange hybrid.
- Lumia, a large dry citron-like fruit that is pear shaped and not necessarily sweet. This is itself a mixed group: one member has been found to have resulted from a lemon crossing with a citron/pomelo hybrid, a second member is a micrantha/citron mix.
- Palestinian sweet lime, Citrus × latifolia, mainly used as a rootstock, a citron/mandarin/pomelo hybrid.
- Ujukitsu, Citrus ujukitsu, or 'lemonade fruit', likely a tangelo, a Kishu mikan crossed with a pomelo-like fruit, produced by citrus pioneer Chōzaburō Tanaka.

== See also ==
- Citrus taxonomy
- Lemonade fruit
