= Variegated pink lemon =

Lemon cultivar

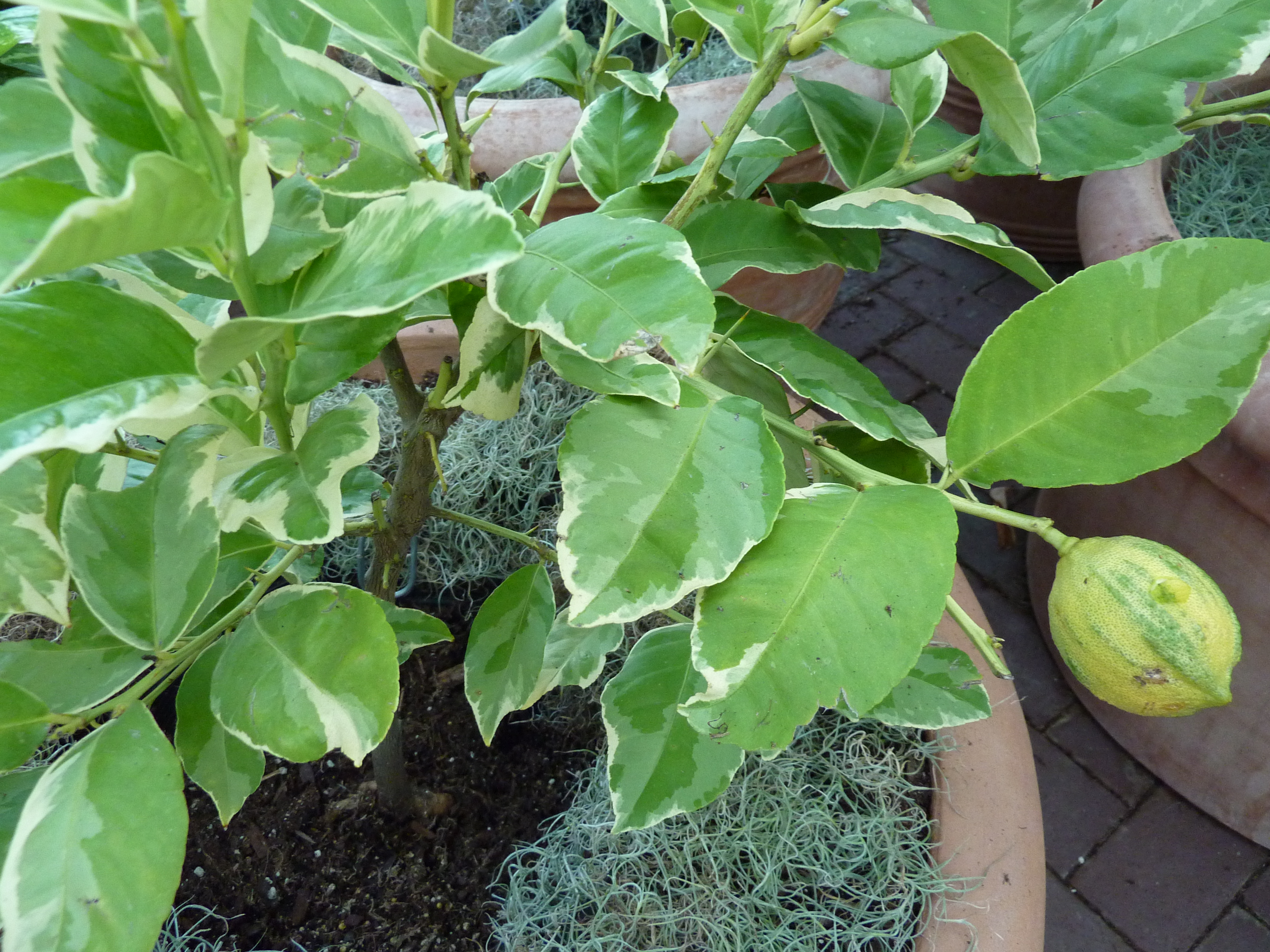
- Variegated pink lemon in the Linnean House of the Missouri Botanical Garden
- Species: Citrus × limon
- Cultivar: Citrus limon 'Variegated Pink'
- Origin: Burbank, California

The variegated pink lemon, also called the variegated Eureka lemon, or pink-fleshed Eureka lemon is a cultivar of lemon (Citrus × limon) with unique pink flesh, a green-striped rind when ripening, and variegated foliage. It was discovered as a sport on an ordinary Eureka lemon tree in Burbank, California, in 1931.

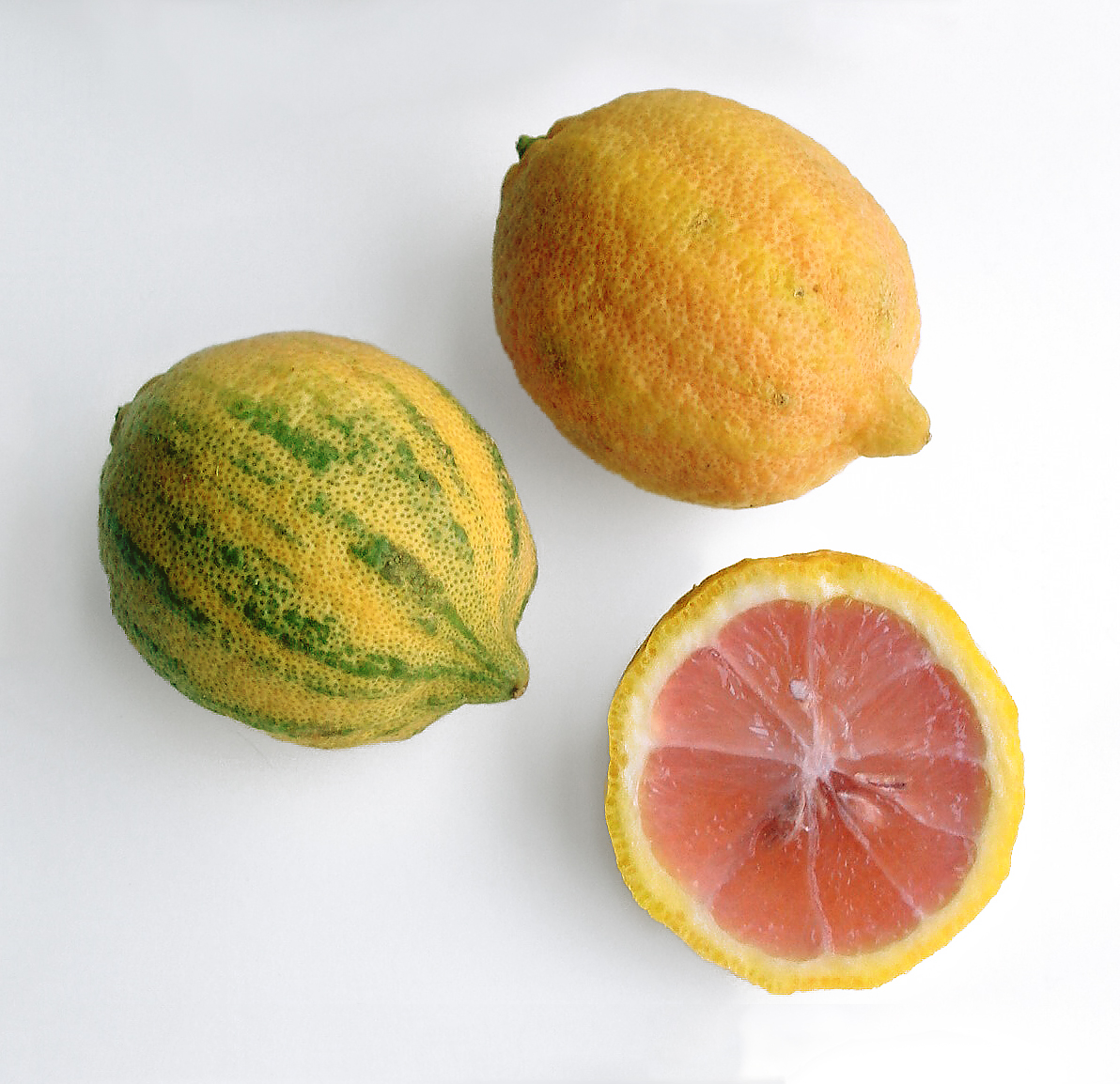
