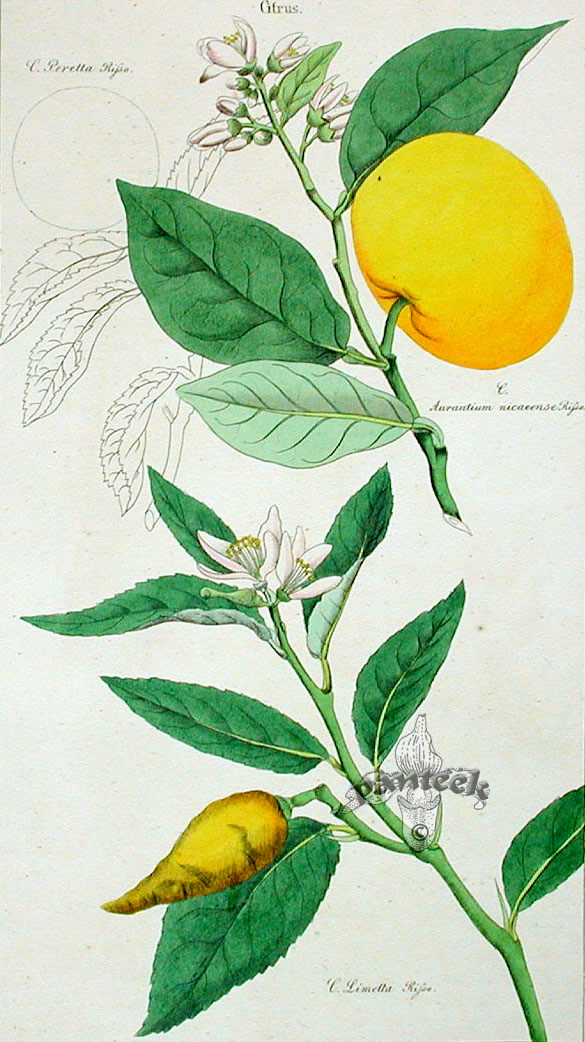

Scientific classification
- Kingdom: Plantae
- Clade: Tracheophytes
- Clade: Angiosperms
- Clade: Eudicots
- Clade: Rosids
- Order: Sapindales
- Family: Rutaceae
- Genus: Citrus
- Species: C. limetta

Binomial name
- Citrus limetta Risso

= Citrus limetta =

Citrus fruit and plant

Citrus limetta, alternatively considered to be a cultivar of Citrus limon, C. limon 'Limetta', is a species of citrus, commonly known as mousami, musami, mosambi, sweet lime, sweet lemon, and sweet limetta, it is a member of the sweet lemons. It is small and round, like a common lime. It is a cross between the citron (Citrus medica) and a bitter orange (Citrus × aurantium).

It is native to the southern regions of Iran and also cultivated in the Mediterranean Basin. It is a different fruit from the Palestinian sweet lime and from familiar sour limes such as the Key lime and the Persian lime. However, genomic analysis revealed that it is highly similar to Rhobs el Arsa, and the two likely represent progeny of distinct crosses involving the same citrus parents.

The South Asian cultivars originated in Mozambique and were brought to South Asia by the Portuguese. The common name mosambi and its variants trace their origin to Mozambique.

== Names ==
- In Bangladesh and the rest of the Bengal region, it is called musambi or mosambi (মুসম্বি/মোসাম্বি, in Bengali).
- In the Dominican Republic and in Costa Rica, it is called limón dulce, lima dulce, dulce limeta, or limettioides dulces, because of the sweetness of these two citrus fruits.
- In France, it is sometimes called bergamot; it should not be confused with Citrus bergamia, the bergamot orange.
- In Iran, it is called limu shirin (لیمو شیرین, meaning 'sweet lemon' in Persian).
- In India, it is commonly called mausambi, mosambi, or musambi in Hindi (मौसंबी or मुसंबी), mausami (𑂧𑂇𑂮𑂧𑂲) in Bhojpuri, musammi (ਮੁਸੰਮੀ) in Punjabi, mosambi (मोसंबी) in Marathi, moushumi or mushumbi lebu (মৌসুমী বা মুসুম্বি লেবু) in Bengali, satukudi or satukodi (சாத்துக்குடி) in Tamil, musambi (ಮೂಸಂಬಿ) in Kannada, battayi (బత్తాయి) in Telugu, chinikaya (చీనీకాయ) in Rayalaseema, and musambi (മുസംബി) in Malayalam.
- In Nepali, it is called mausam.
- In Pakistan, it is usually called meetha (میٹھا) in Urdu, mitha (مٹھا) in Punjabi, and mosami (موسمی) in Sindhi
- Among Iraqi Armenians, it is called noumi (նումի).
- In the Yucatán, it is called "lima". This is commonly confused with dishes such as Sopa de lima, which is translated as "lime soup". The word for sour lime in the Yucatan is limón.

== Description ==
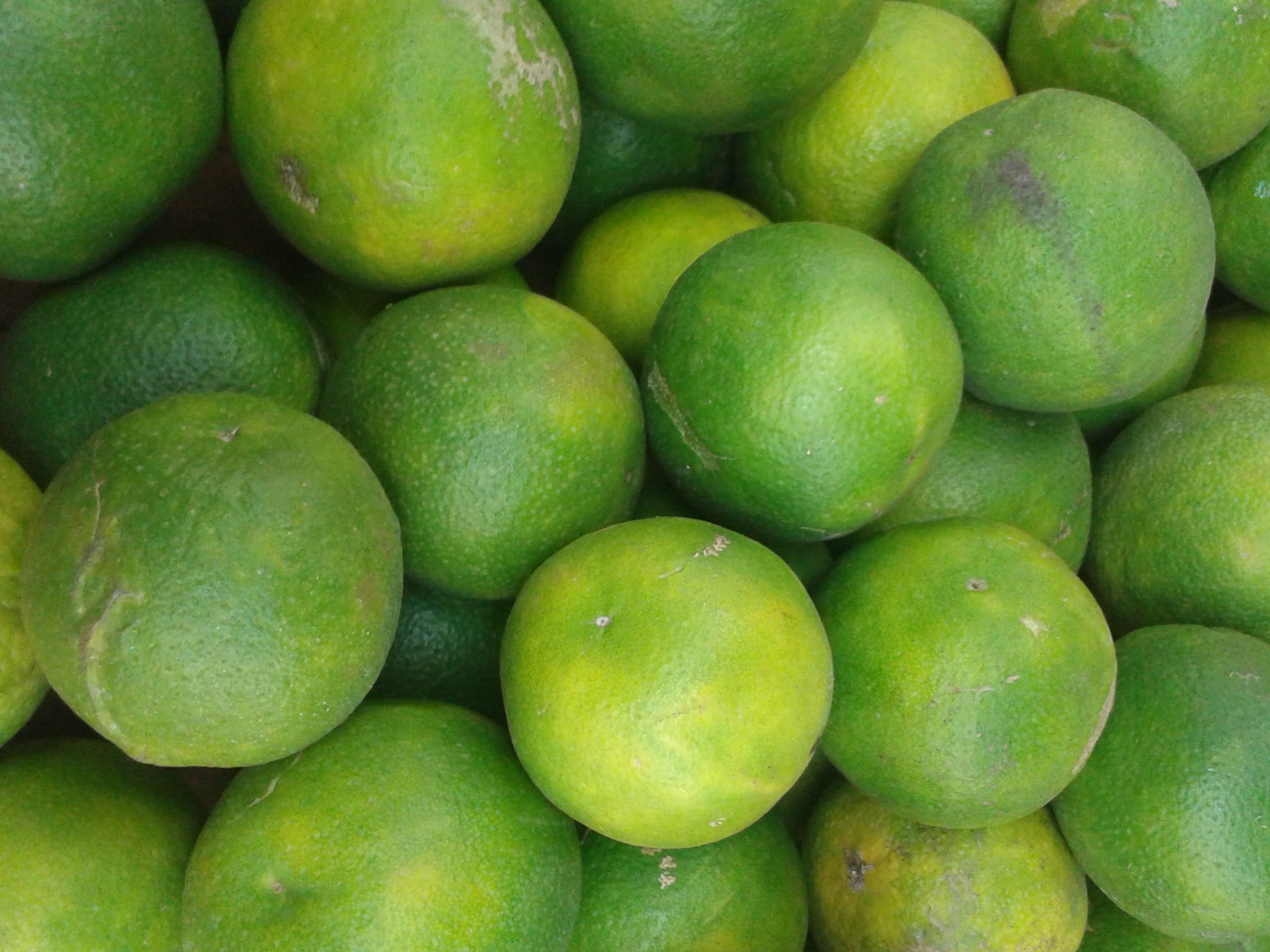
The limetta (lemetjie), Mosambi cultivar, at a market in Seethammadhara.

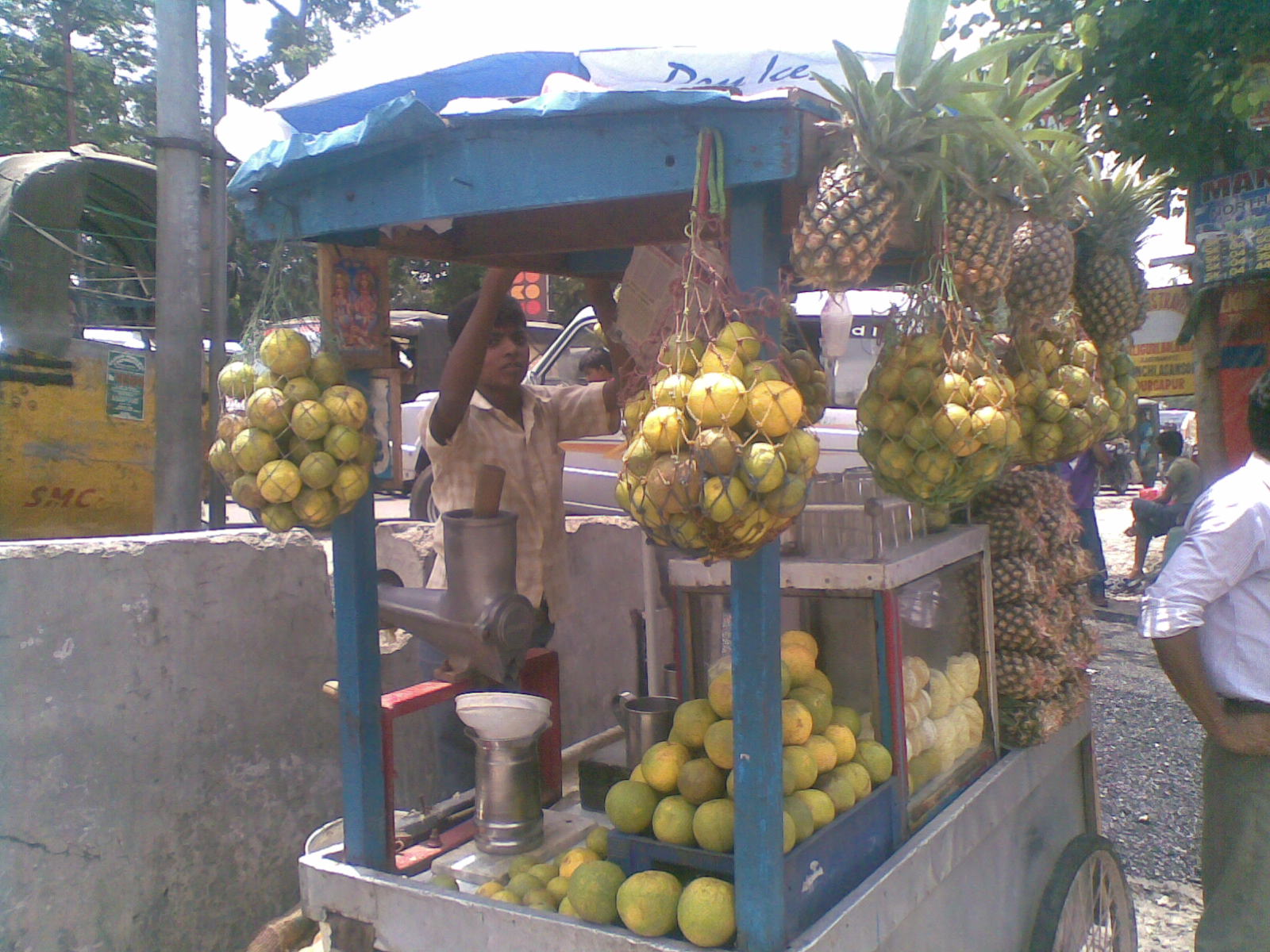
Mosambi (sweet lime) juice is a popular citrus drink in India

C. limetta is a small tree up to 8 m (26 ft) in height, with irregular branches and relatively smooth, brownish-grey bark. It has numerous thorns, 15–75 mm (0.59–2.95 in) long. The petioles are narrowly but distinctly winged, and are 8–29 mm (0.31–1.14 in) long. Leaves are compound, with acuminate leaflets 50–170 mm (2.0–6.7 in) long and 28–89 mm (1.1–3.5 in) wide. Flowers are white, 20–30 mm (0.79–1.18 in) wide. Fruits are oval and green, ripening to yellow, with greenish pulp. The pith is white and about 5 mm (0.20 in) thick. Despite the name sweet lime, the fruit is more similar to a greenish orange in appearance.

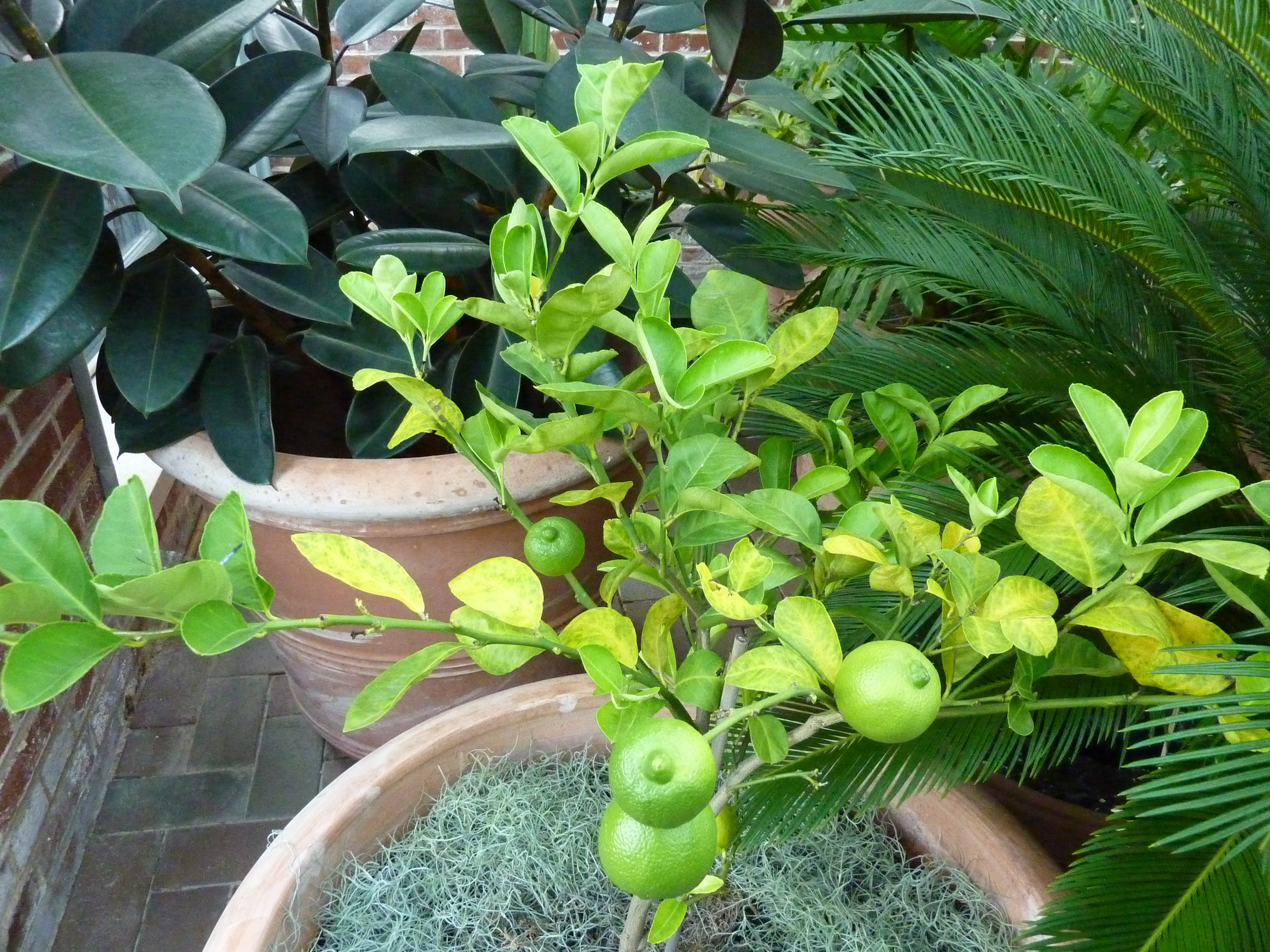
'Millsweet' (named after J.W. Mills) cultivar of limetta in growth.

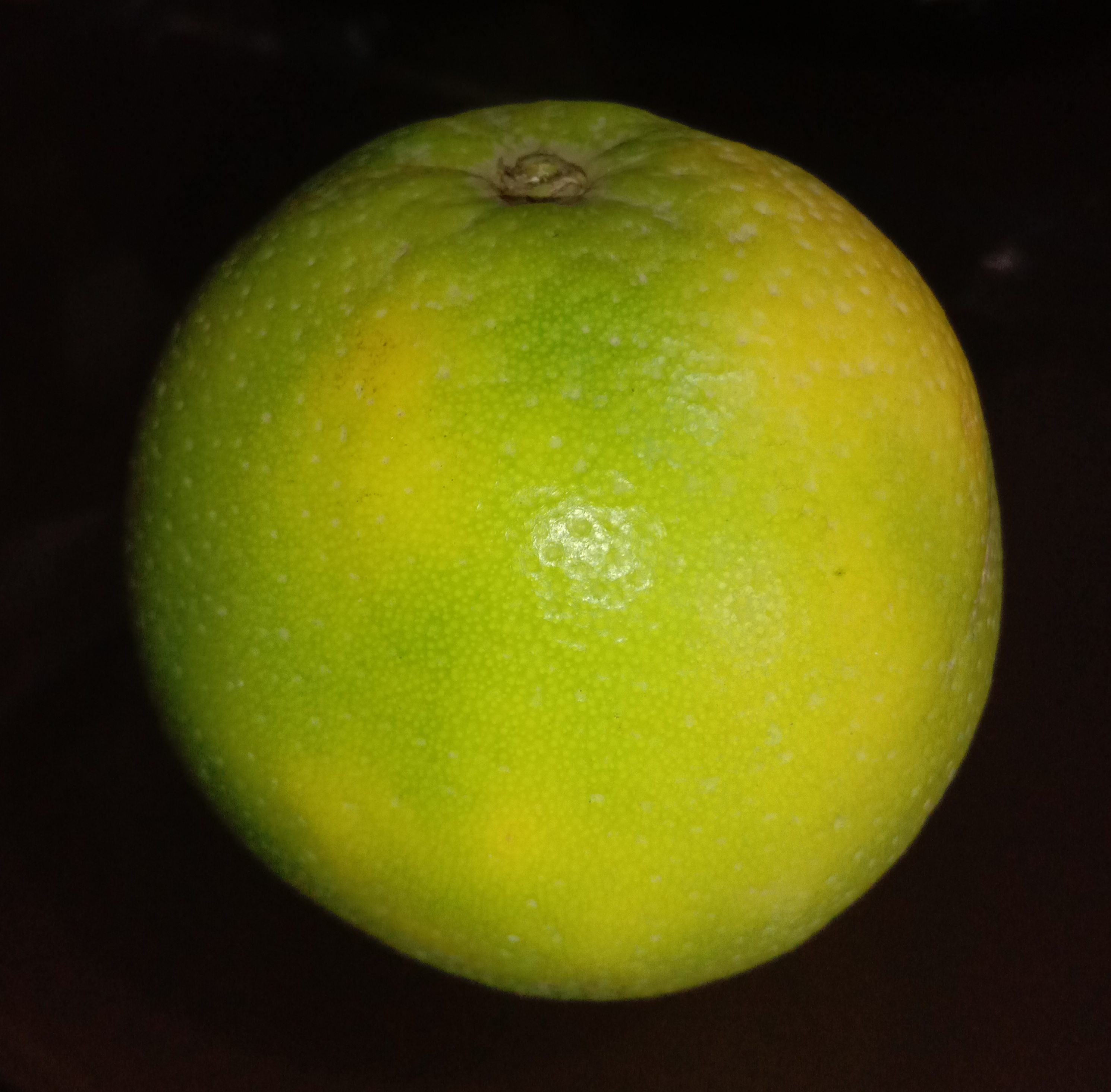
Moushumi or mushumbi lebu in West Bengal, India.

C. limetta grows in tropical and subtropical climates. It begins bearing fruit at 5 to 7 years old, with peak production at 10 to 20 years. It is propagated by seed.

== Flavour ==
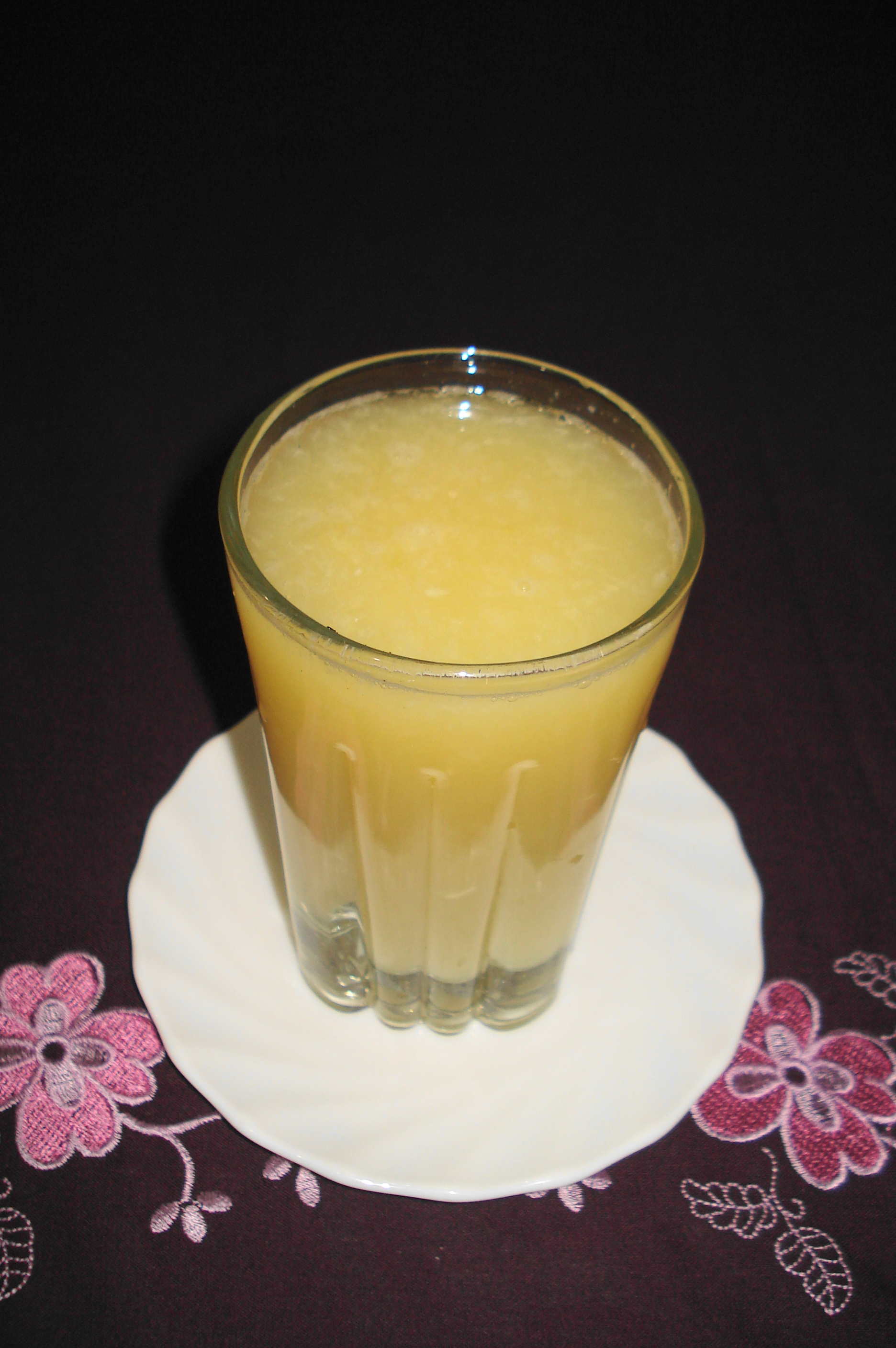
Freshly pressed sweet lime juice as served in the Indian subcontinent

As the name sweet lime suggests, the flavour is sweet and mild, but retains the essence of lime. The lime's taste changes rapidly when exposed to air, and will turn bitter in a few minutes, but if drunk soon after being juiced, the taste is sweet. The flavour is a bit flatter than most citrus due to its lack of acidity. It can be compared to limeade and pomelo. Best tasted with black salt (kaala namak) which adds rich exotic taste.

== Uses ==
Sweet lime is served as juice and a good mixer for vodka or rum. It is the most common citrus juice available in the Indian subcontinent. The juice is commonly sold at mobile road stalls.

Like most citrus, the fruit is rich in vitamin C, providing 50 mg per 100 g serving and antioxidants. In Iran, it is popular as a home remedy to treat influenza and the common cold.

The tree is used for ornamental purposes as well as for graft stock.

Sweet Lime
Nutritional value per 100 g (3.5 oz)
- Energy: 180 kJ (43 kcal)
- Carbohydrates: 9.3 g
- Sugars: 1.7g
- Dietary fibre: 0.5 g
- Fat: 0.3 g
- Protein: 0.7-0.8 g
Vitamins and minerals
Vitamins	Quantity %DV^{†}
Vitamin C	56% 50 mg
Minerals	Quantity %DV^{†}
Calcium	3% 40 mg
Iron	4% 0.7 mg
Phosphorus	2% 30 mg
Potassium	16% 490 mg
- Other constituents: Quantity
- Water: 88 g
- ^{†}Percentages estimated using US recommendations for adults, except for potassium, which is estimated based on expert recommendation from the National Academies.

== Checking for ripeness ==
Like most citrus, sweet limes will not ripen off the tree, and must be picked when fully ripe. This is indicated by its tennis-ball size and lustrous, greenish-yellow sheen. Gently scratch the surface of a sweet lime: If its oils give way in the fingernails, it is ripe. The juiciest fruits feel heavy for their size.

Underripe fruit feels light for its size and has hard tart flesh. Overripe fruit is dull and shrunken, with dry, spongy skin. Avoid fruit with brownish-yellow discoloration.

== Storage ==
Sweet limes keep fresh for up to two weeks at room temperature, and four to eight weeks refrigerated. Frozen juice will keep for up to six months. It is possible to freeze slices of the fruit, though the limonin content may cause the pulp to taste bitter over time. This can be avoided by submerging the slices in sweet syrup within an airtight glass jar.
