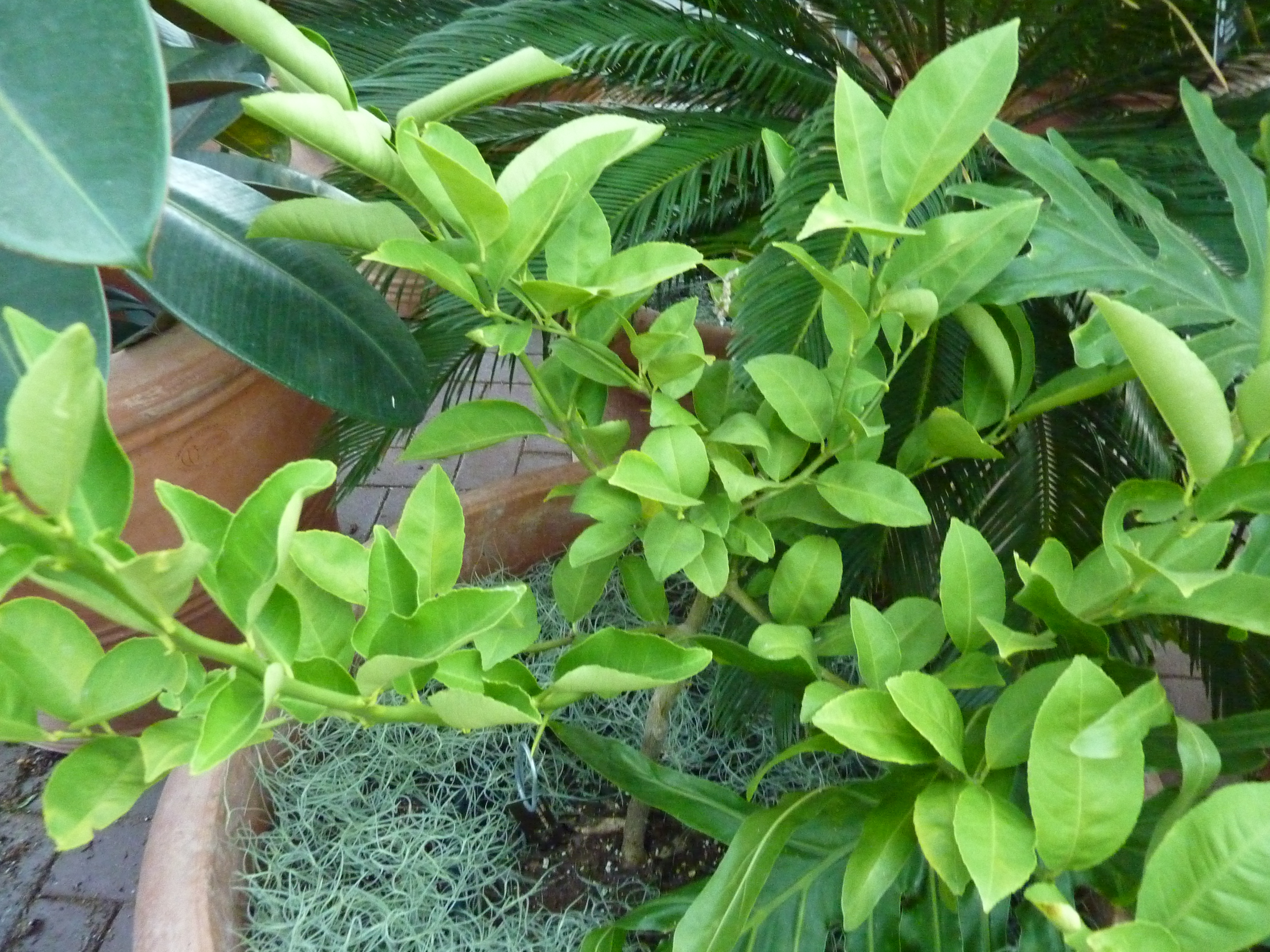

Scientific classification
- Kingdom: Plantae
- Clade: Tracheophytes
- Clade: Angiosperms
- Clade: Eudicots
- Clade: Rosids
- Order: Sapindales
- Family: Rutaceae
- Genus: Citrus
- Species: C. limettioides

Binomial name
- Citrus limettioides Yu.Tanaka

Synonyms
- Citrus medica L. var. limetta Wight & Arn.

= Palestinian sweet lime =

Species of fruit and plant

Citrus limettioides, Palestinian sweet lime or Indian sweet lime or Lima tree or common sweet lime, alternatively considered a cultivar of Citrus × limon, C. × limon 'Indian Lime', is a low-acid lime used in Palestine for food, juice and rootstock. It is a member of the sweet limes. Like the Meyer lemon, it is the result of a cross between the citron (Citrus medica) and a mandarin/pomelo hybrid distinct from sweet and sour oranges.

It is distinct from the limetta which is sometimes also called sweet lime, but derives from a citron/sour orange cross. The juice and zest of the sweet citrus can be used in cooking to add a tangy flavor to food and it’s especially utilized in Middle Eastern and Southeast Asian cuisine. The Citrus limettioides components can be made into medicine that helps relieve respiratory illnesses such as coughing, chest pressure, colds, and congestion.
