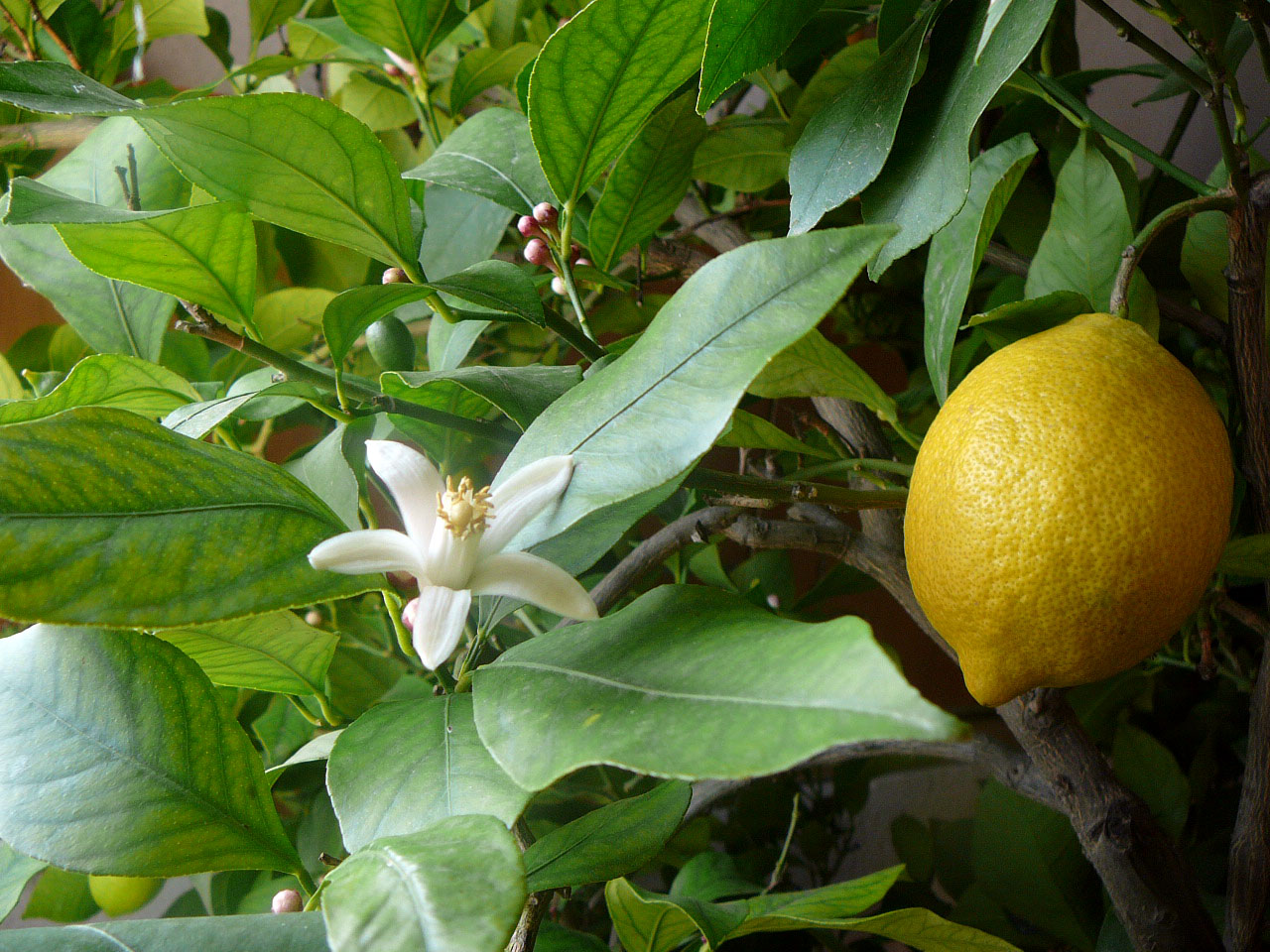
- A fruiting lemon tree (blossom visible)

Scientific classification
- Kingdom: Plantae
- Clade: Tracheophytes
- Clade: Angiosperms
- Clade: Eudicots
- Clade: Rosids
- Order: Sapindales
- Family: Rutaceae
- Genus: Citrus
- Species: C. × limon

Binomial name
- Citrus × limon (L.) Osbeck

Synonyms
- List: Citrus × aurantium subsp. bergamia (Risso & Poit.) Engl.; Citrus aurantium subsp. bergamia (Risso) Wight & Arn.; Citrus aurantium var. bergamia (Risso) Brandis; Citrus × aurantium var. mellarosa (Risso) Engl.; Citrus × bergamia Risso & Poit.; Citrus × bergamia subsp. mellarosa (Risso) D.Rivera & al.; Citrus × bergamota Raf.; Citrus × limodulcis D.Rivera, Obón & F.Méndez; Citrus × limonelloides Hayata; Citrus × limonia Osbeck; Citrus × limonia var. digitata Risso; Citrus × limonum Risso; Citrus medica var. limon L.; Citrus medica f. limon (L.) M.Hiroe; Citrus medica f. limon (L.) Hiroë; Citrus medica subsp. limonia (Risso) Hook. f.; Citrus × medica var. limonum (Risso) Brandis; Citrus × medica subsp. limonum (Risso) Engl.; Citrus medica var. limonum (Risso) Brandis; Citrus × mellarosa Risso; Citrus × meyeri Yu.Tanaka; Citrus × vulgaris Ferrarius ex Mill.; Limon × vulgaris Ferrarius ex Miller

= Lemon =

Yellow citrus fruit

The lemon (Citrus × limon) is a species of small evergreen tree in the Citrus genus of the flowering plant family Rutaceae. A true lemon is a hybrid of the citron and the bitter orange. Its origins are uncertain, but some evidence suggests lemons originated during the 1st millennium BC in what is now northeastern India. Some other citrus fruits are called lemon.

The yellow fruit of the lemon tree is used throughout the world, primarily for its juice. The pulp and rind are used in cooking and baking. The juice of the lemon is about 5–6% citric acid, giving it a sour taste. This makes it a key ingredient in drinks and foods such as lemonade and lemon meringue pie.

In 2024, world production was 23 million tonnes, led by India and Mexico with 31% of the total.

== Description ==
The lemon tree produces a pointed oval yellow fruit. Botanically this is a hesperidium, a modified berry with a tough, leathery rind. The rind is divided into an outer colored layer or zest, which is aromatic with essential oils, and an inner layer of white spongy pith. Inside are multiple carpels arranged as radial segments. The seeds develop inside the carpels. The space inside each segment is a locule filled with juice vesicles.

Lemons contain many phytochemicals, including polyphenols, terpenes, and tannins. Their juice contains slightly more citric acid than lime juice (about 47 g/L), nearly twice as much as grapefruit juice, and about five times as much as orange juice.

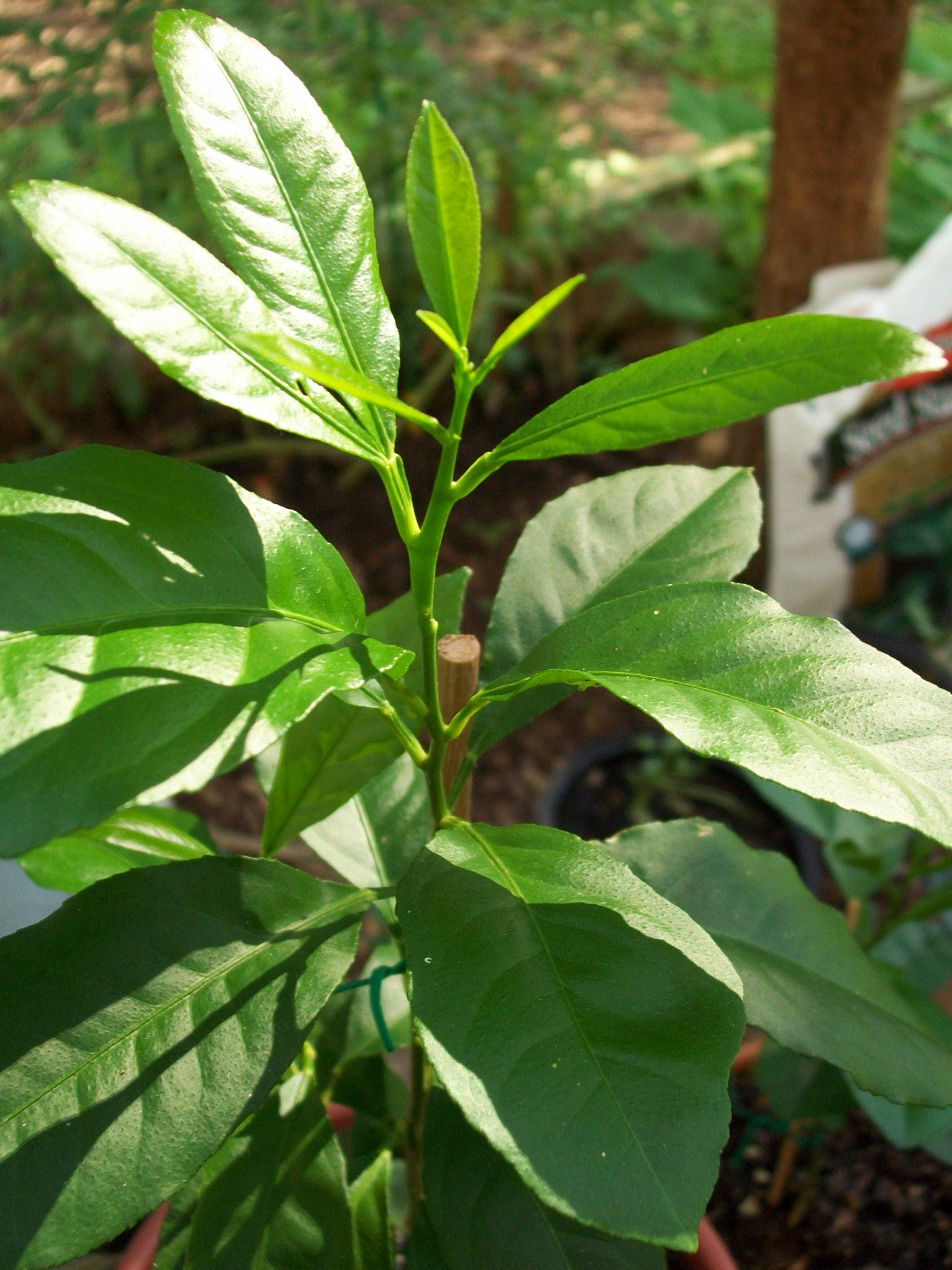
Lemon seedling

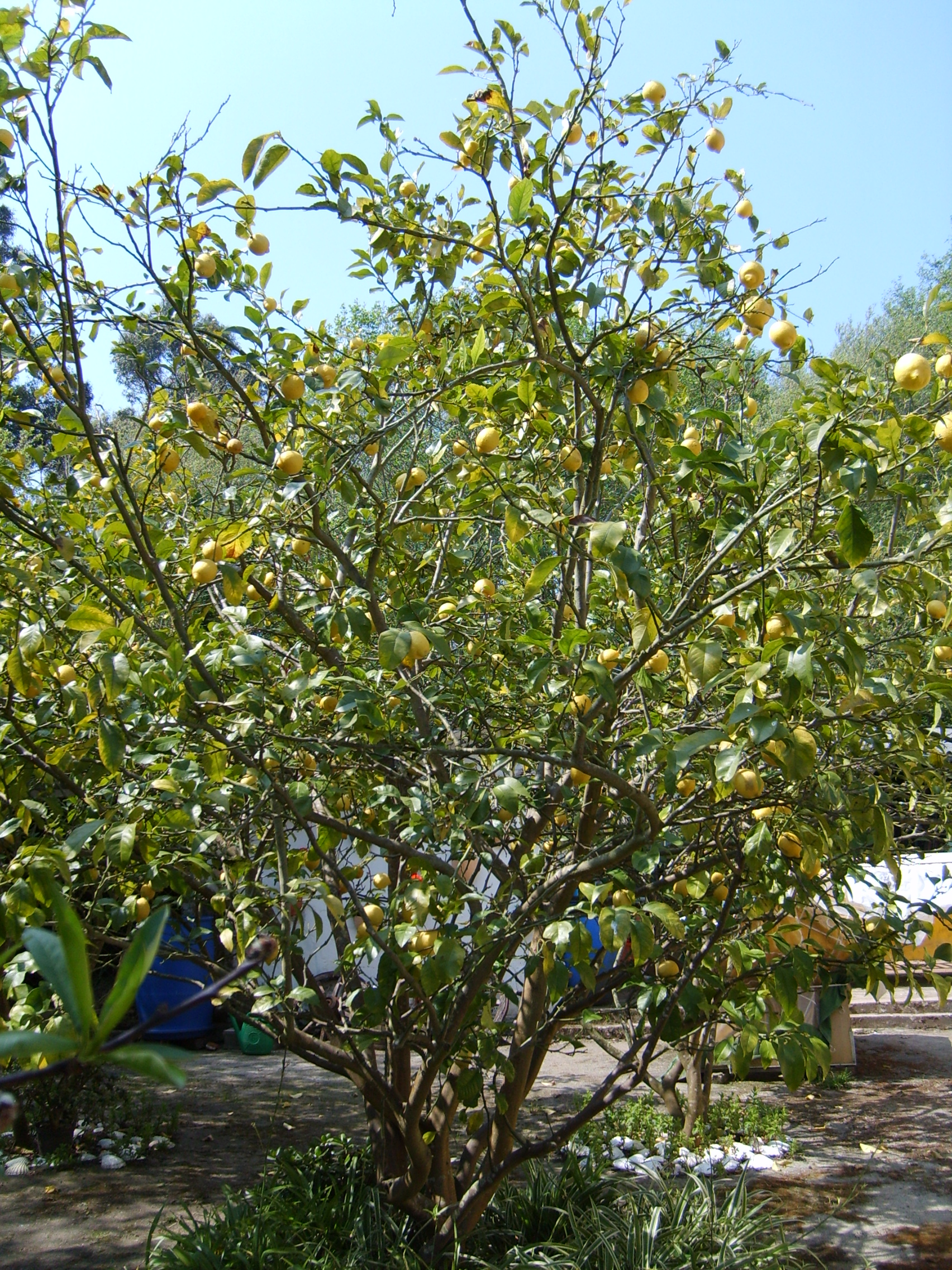
Full-sized tree

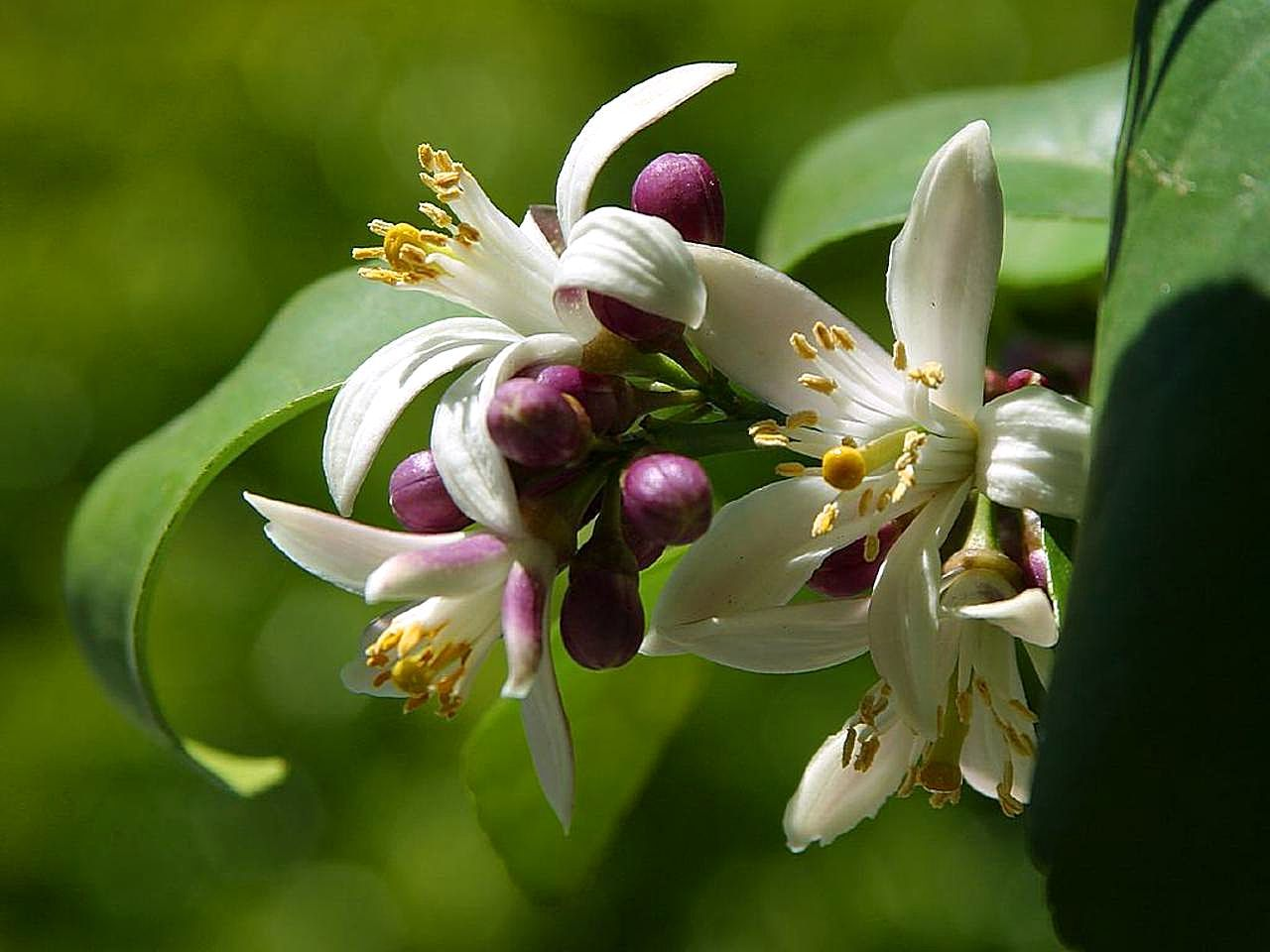
Flower

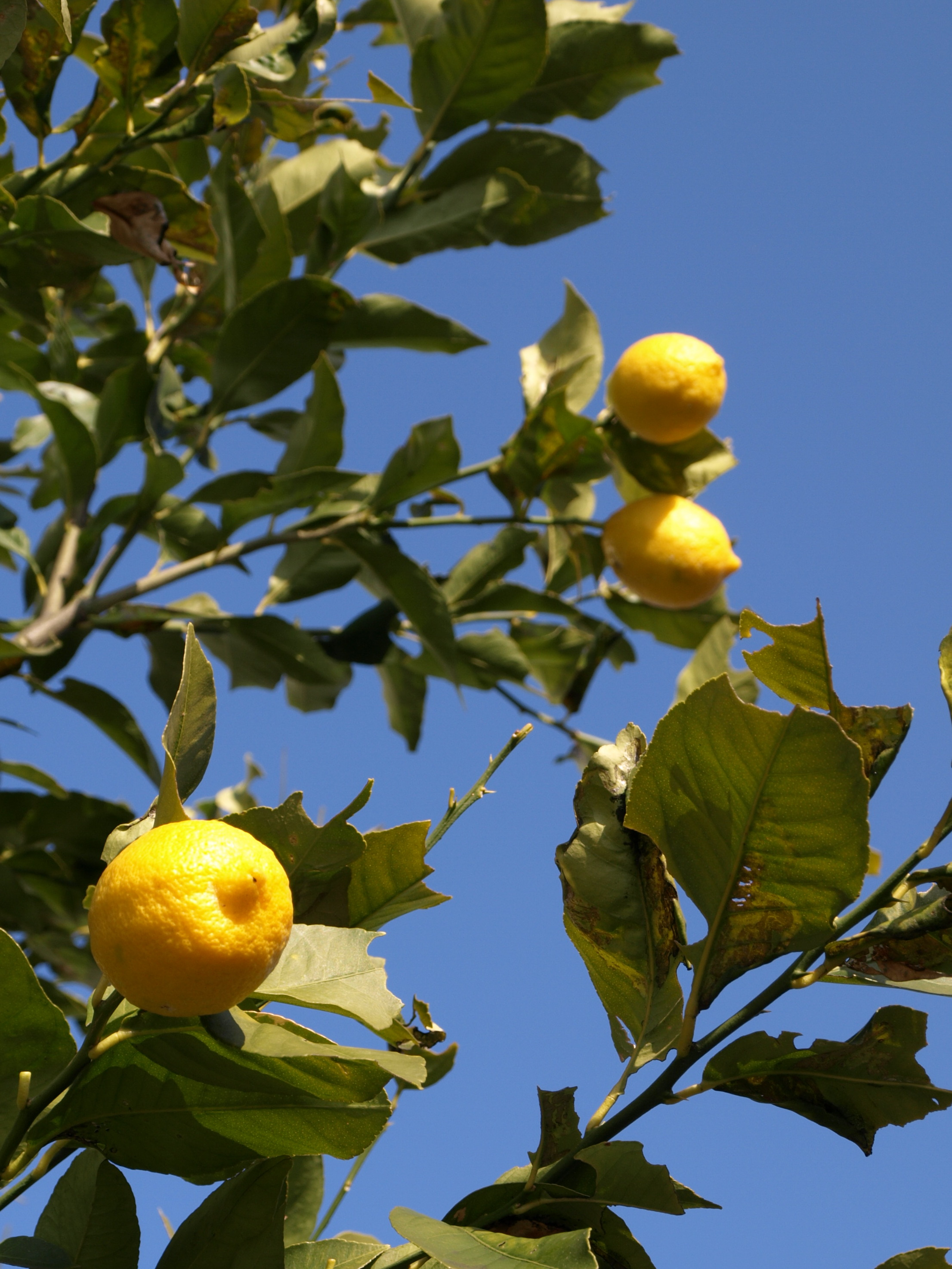
Mature lemons

== Origins ==
The lemon, like many other cultivated Citrus species, is a hybrid, in its case of the citron and the bitter orange.

The lemon is a hybrid of the citron and the bitter orange.

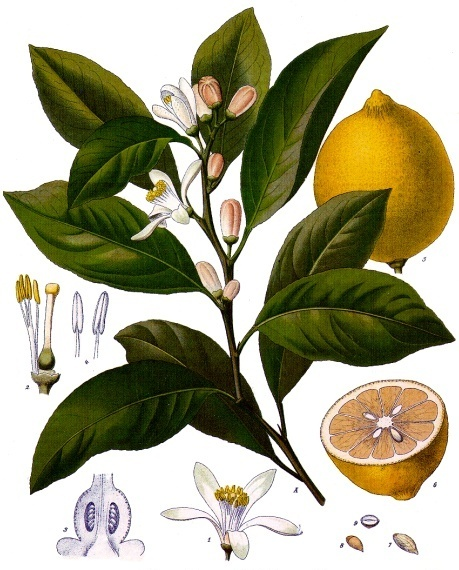
Taxonomic illustration by Franz Eugen Köhler, 1897

The lemon's site of origin is unknown but northwest India has been proposed. The origin of the word lemon may be Middle Eastern. The word draws from the Old French limon, then Italian limone, from the Arabic ليمون laymūn or līmūn, and from the Persian لیمو līmūn, a generic term for citrus fruit, which is a cognate of Sanskrit (nimbū, 'lime').

Lemons entered Europe near southern Italy no later than the second century AD, during the time of Ancient Rome. They were later introduced to Persia and then to Iraq and Egypt around 700 AD. The lemon was first recorded in literature in a 10th-century Arabic treatise on farming; it was used as an ornamental plant in early Islamic gardens. It was distributed widely throughout the Arab world and the Mediterranean region in the Arab Agricultural Revolution between 1000 and 1150. A section on lemon and lime tree cultivation in Andalusia, Spain, was included in Ibn al-'Awwam's 12th-century agricultural work, Kitāb al-Filāha ("Book on Agriculture"). The first substantial cultivation of lemons in Europe began in Genoa in the middle of the 15th century. It was introduced to the Americas in 1493, when Christopher Columbus brought lemon seeds to Hispaniola on his voyages. Spanish conquest throughout the New World helped spread lemon seeds, part of the Columbian exchange of plants between the Old and New Worlds. It was mainly used as an ornamental plant and for medicine. In the 19th century, lemons were increasingly planted in Florida and California. In 1747, the English physician James Lind's experiments on seamen suffering from scurvy involved adding lemon juice to their diets, though vitamin C was not yet known as an important dietary ingredient.

== Cultivation ==
=== Growing and pruning ===
Lemons need a minimum temperature of around 7 °C (45 °F), so they are not hardy year-round in temperate climates, but become hardier as they mature. Citrus require minimal pruning by trimming overcrowded branches, with the tallest branch cut back to encourage bushy growth. Throughout summer, pinching back tips of the most vigorous growth assures more abundant canopy development. As mature plants may produce unwanted, fast-growing shoots (called "water shoots"), these are removed from the main branches at the bottom or middle of the plant. There is reputed merit in the tradition of urinating near a lemon tree.

In cultivation in the UK, the cultivars "Meyer" and "Variegata" have gained the Royal Horticultural Society's Award of Garden Merit (confirmed 2017).

=== Production ===
Production of lemons and limes 2024, millions of tonnes
India	3.8
Mexico	3.3
China	2.3
Argentina	2.2
Brazil	1.7
Turkey	1.7
World	23.2
Source: FAOSTAT of the United Nations

In 2024, world production of lemons (together with limes for reporting) was 23 million tonnes, led by India and Mexico with 31% of the total when combined (table). China and Argentina were secondary producers.

Lemon and lime yield

Production of lemons and limes

=== Varieties ===
The 'Bonnie Brae' is oblong, smooth, thin-skinned, and seedless. These are mostly grown in San Diego County, California, United States.

The 'Eureka' grows year-round and abundantly. This is the common supermarket lemon, also known as "Four Seasons" (Quatre Saisons) because of its ability to produce fruit and flowers together throughout the year. The variety developed in California in the 19th Century from specimens brought to California during the Gold Rush by immigrants from Naples and Sicily. This variety is also available as a plant for domestic customers. There is also a pink-fleshed Eureka lemon with a green and yellow variegated outer skin.

The Lisbon lemon is very similar to the Eureka and is the other common supermarket lemon. It is smoother than the Eureka, has thinner skin, and has fewer or no seeds. It generally produces more juice than the Eureka and was brought to California by Portuguese immigrants.

The 'Femminello St. Teresa', or 'Sorrento' originates in Italy. This fruit's zest is high in lemon oils. It is the variety traditionally used in the making of limoncello.

The 'Yen Ben' is an Australasian cultivar.

== Uses ==
=== Nutrition ===
Lemon, raw, without peel
Nutritional value per 100 g (3.5 oz)
- Energy: 29 kcal (120 kJ)
- Carbohydrates: 9.32 g
- Sugars: 2.5 g
- Dietary fiber: 2.8 g
- Fat: 0.3 g
- Protein: 1.1 g
Vitamins and minerals
Vitamins	Quantity %DV^{†}
Thiamine (B1)	3% 0.04 mg
Riboflavin (B2)	2% 0.02 mg
Niacin (B3)	1% 0.1 mg
Pantothenic acid (B5)	4% 0.19 mg
Vitamin B6	5% 0.08 mg
Folate (B9)	3% 11 μg
Vitamin C	59% 53 mg
Minerals	Quantity %DV^{†}
Calcium	2% 26 mg
Iron	3% 0.6 mg
Magnesium	2% 8 mg
Manganese	1% 0.03 mg
Phosphorus	1% 16 mg
Potassium	5% 138 mg
Zinc	1% 0.06 mg
- Other constituents: Quantity
- Water: 89 g
- Full Link to USDA FoodData Central entry
- ^{†}Percentages estimated using US recommendations for adults, except for potassium, which is estimated based on expert recommendation from the National Academies.

A raw lemon (without peel) is 89% water, 9% carbohydrates, 1% protein, and contains negligible fat (table). In a reference amount of 100 g (3.5 oz), raw lemon supplies 29 calories and is a rich source of vitamin C, providing 59% of the Daily Value, with other micronutrients low in content (table).

=== Culinary ===
Lemon juice and rind are used in a wide variety of foods and drinks, the juice for its sour taste, from its content of 5–6% citric acid. The whole lemon is used to make marmalade, lemon curd and lemon liqueurs such as Limoncello. Lemon slices and lemon rind are used as a garnish for food and drinks. Lemon zest, the grated outer rind of the fruit, is used to add flavor to baked goods. The juice is used to make lemonade and some cocktails.

It is used in marinades for fish, where its acid neutralizes amines in fish. In meat, the acid partially hydrolyzes tough collagen fibers, tenderizing it. In the United Kingdom, lemon juice is frequently added to pancakes eaten to celebrate Shrove Tuesday. Lemon juice is used as a short-term preservative on certain foods that tend to oxidize and turn brown after being sliced (enzymatic browning), such as apples, bananas, and avocados: its acidity suppresses oxidation by polyphenol oxidase enzymes.

Lemon peel is used in the manufacture of pectin, a gelling agent and stabilizer in food and other products. In Mediterranean countries including Morocco, lemons are preserved in jars or barrels of salt. The salt penetrates the peel and rind, softening them, and curing them so that they last almost indefinitely.

Lemon oil is extracted from oil-containing cells in the skin. A machine breaks up the cells and uses a water spray to flush off the oil. The oil–water mixture is then filtered and separated by centrifugation.

The leaves of the lemon tree are used to make a tea and for preparing cooked meats and seafoods.

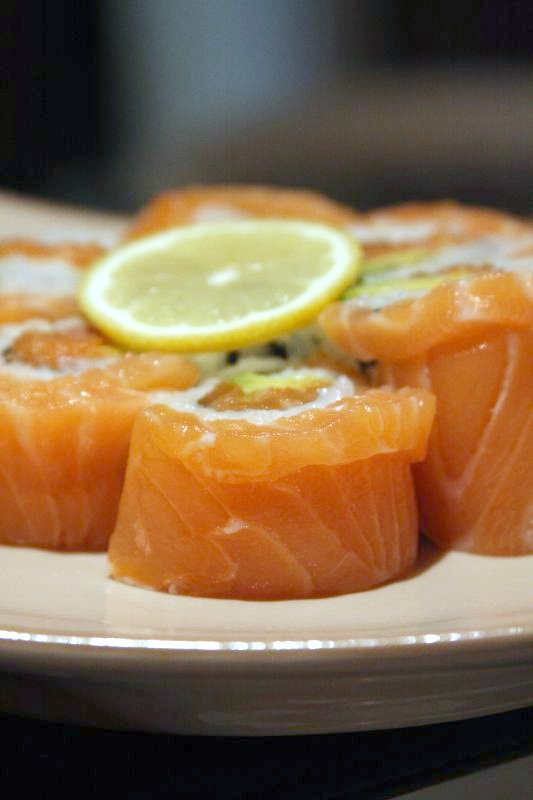
Lemon as a garnish

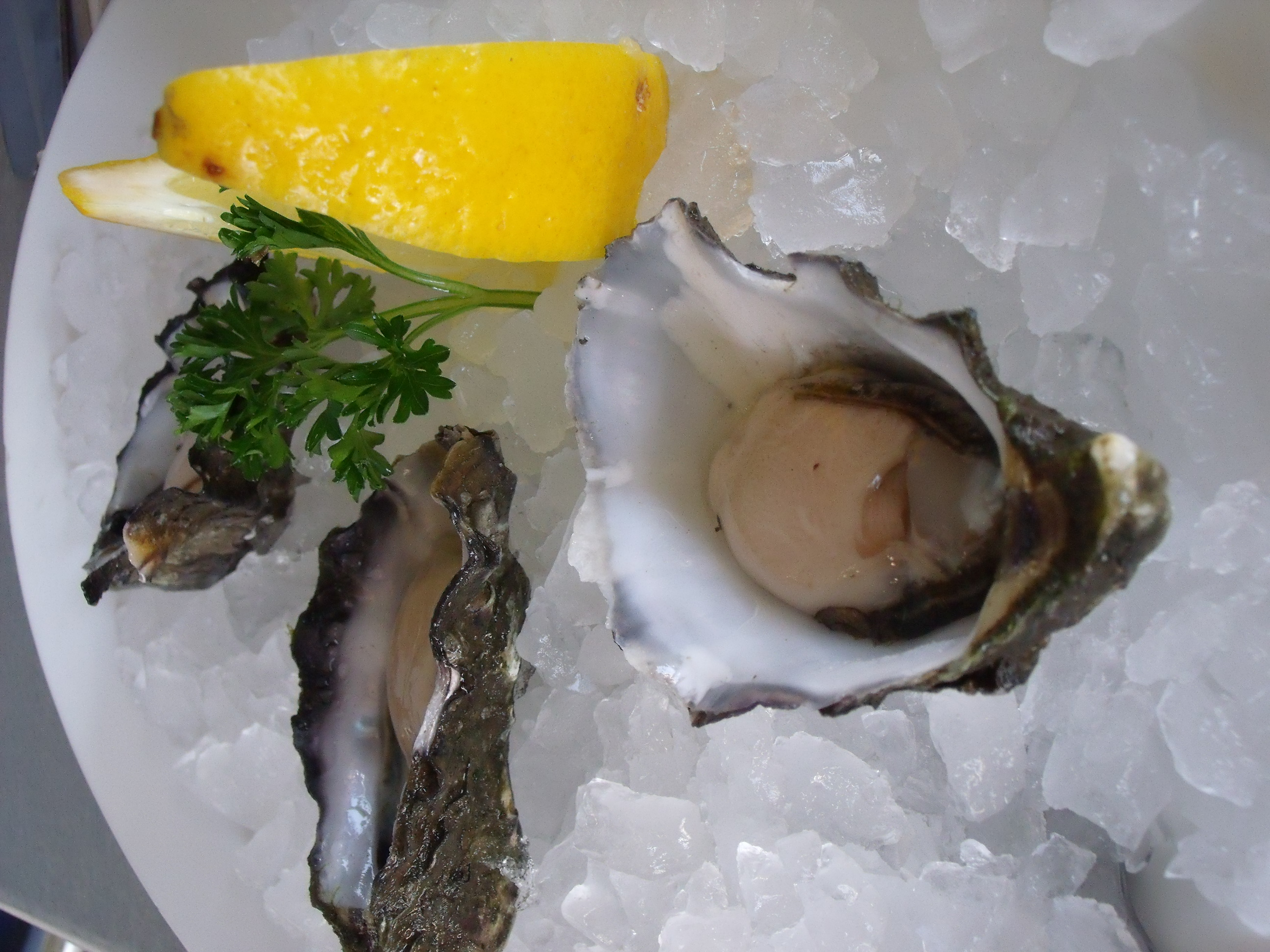
Oysters with lemon

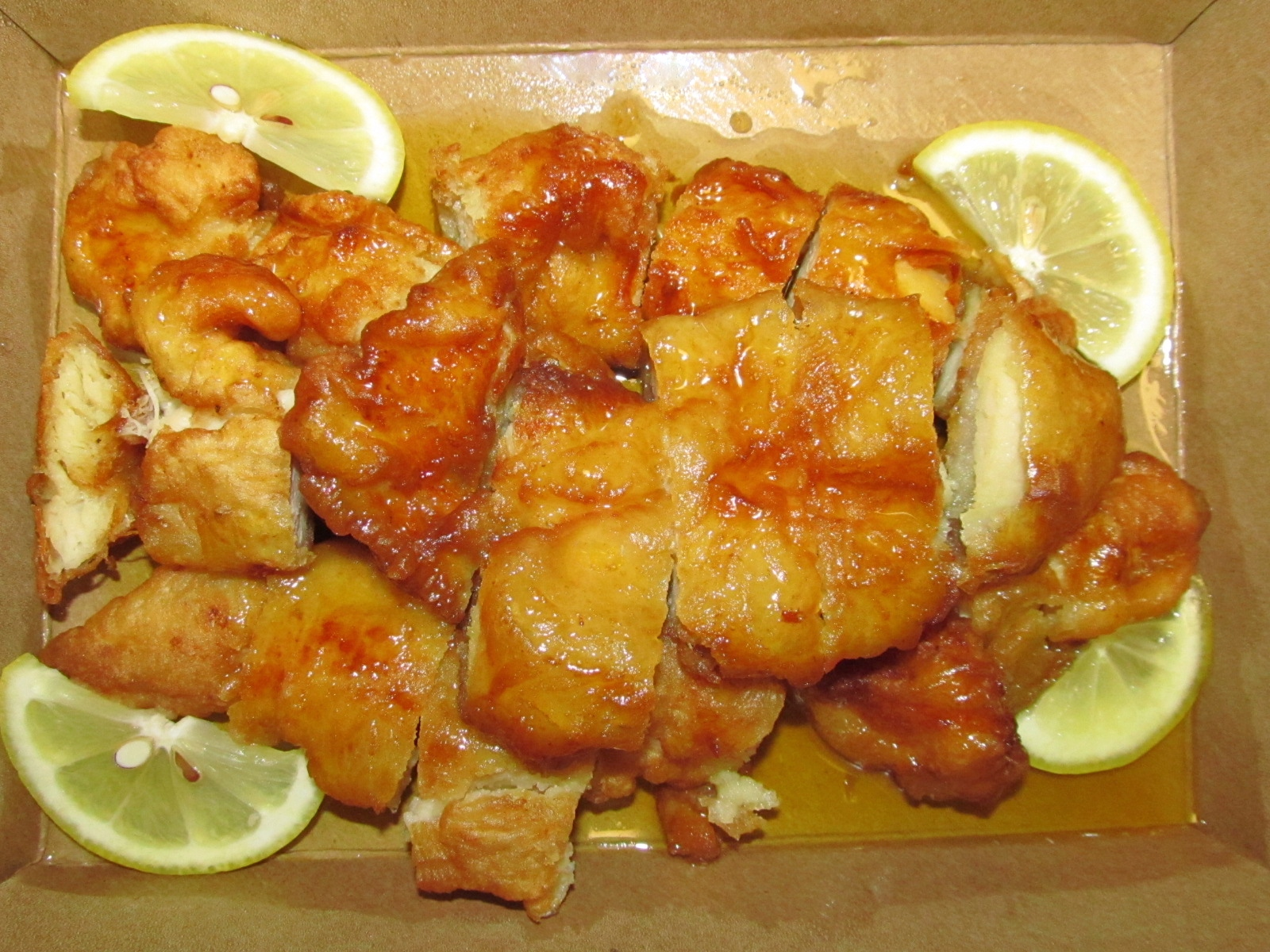
Lemon chicken

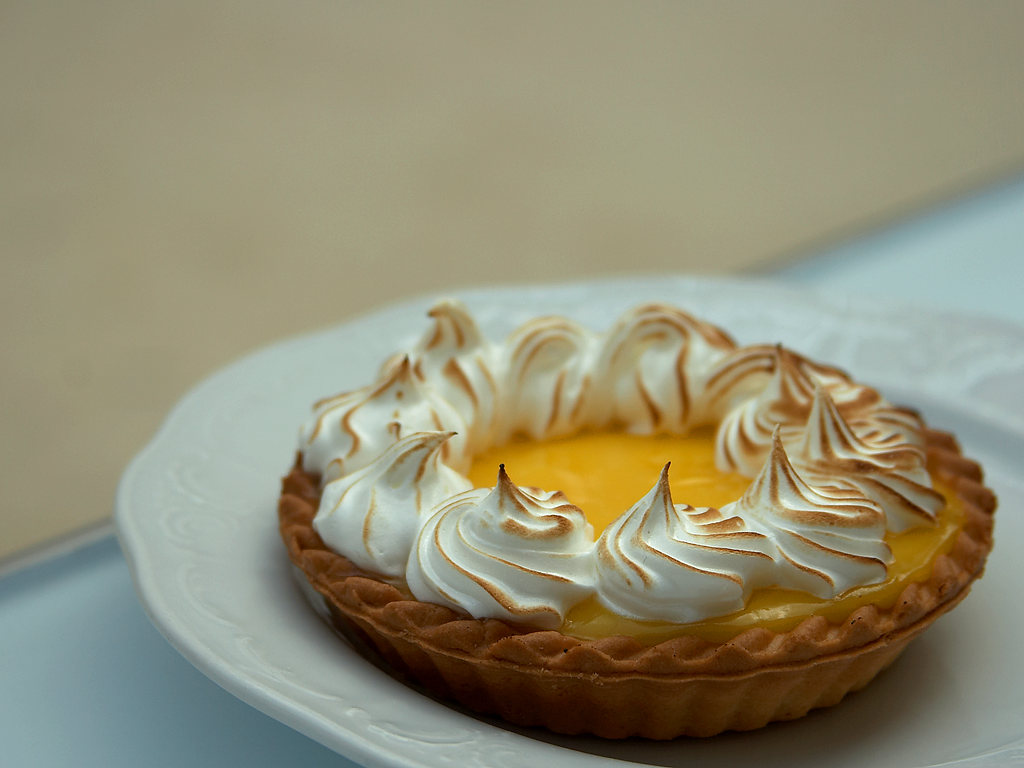
Lemon meringue pie

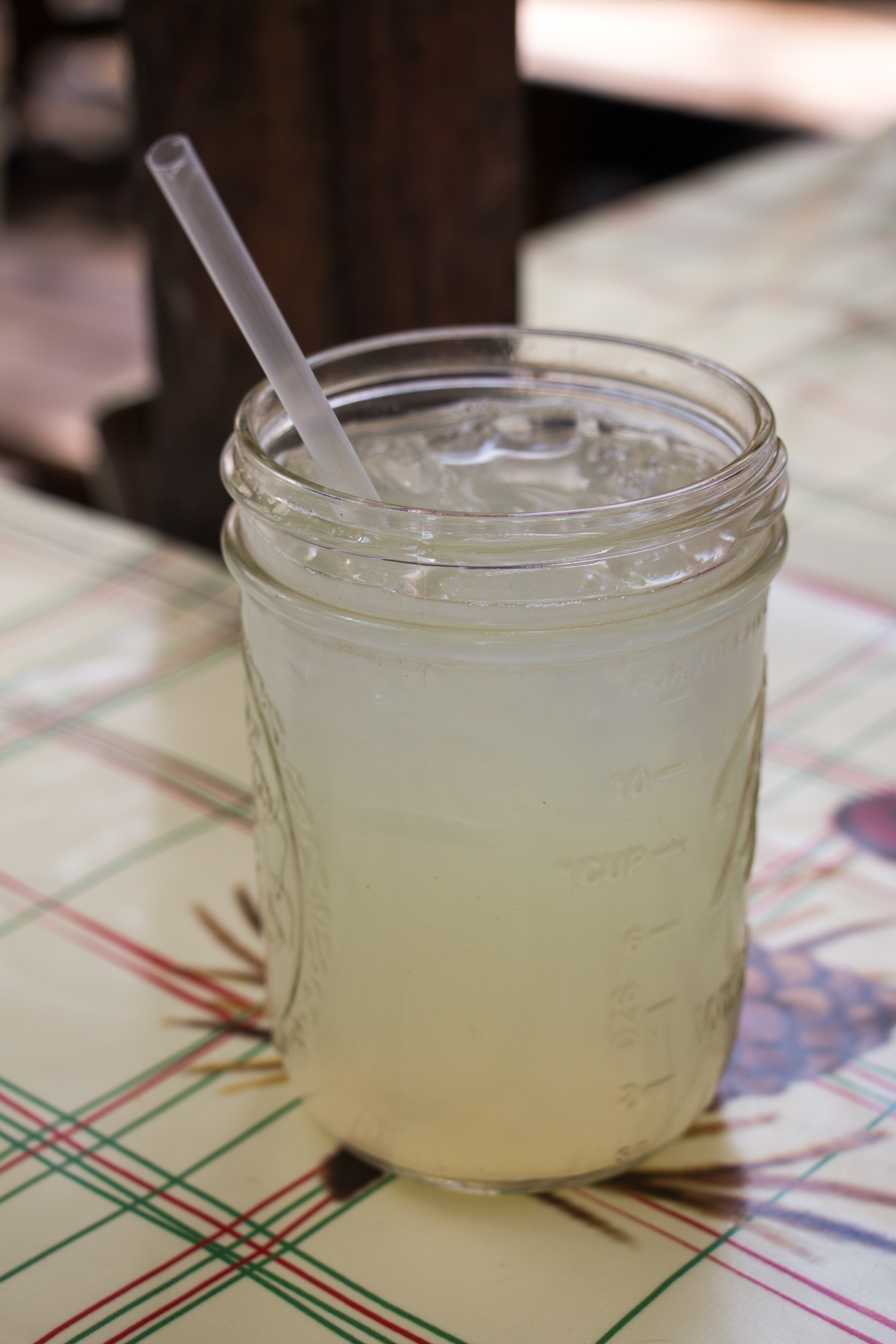
Lemonade

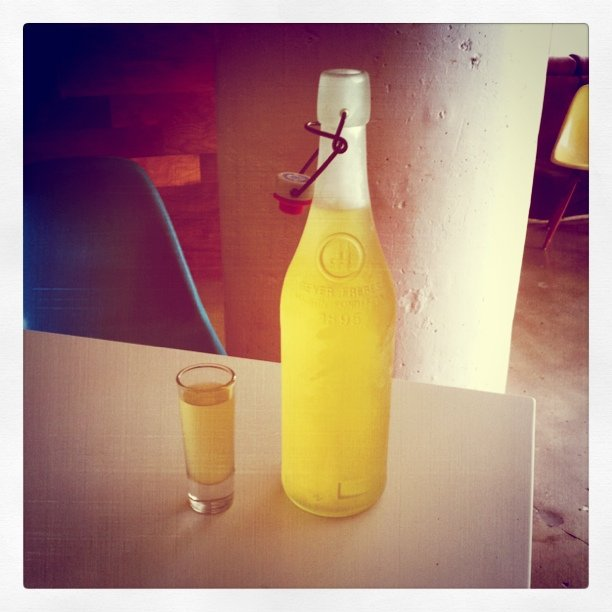
Limoncello liqueur

=== Other uses ===
Lemons were the primary commercial source of citric acid before the development of fermentation-based processes. Lemon oil is used in aromatherapy. Lemon oil aroma does not influence the human immune system, but may contribute to relaxation. An educational science experiment involves attaching electrodes to a lemon and using it as a battery to produce electricity. Although very low power, several lemon batteries can power a small digital watch. Lemon juice forms a simple invisible ink, developed by heat. Lemon juice is sometimes used to increase the blonde color of hair, acting as a natural highlight after the moistened hair is exposed to sunlight.

== Other citrus called lemons ==
- Flat lemon, a mandarin hybrid
- Meyer lemon, a cross between a citron and a mandarin/pomelo hybrid distinct from sour or sweet orange
- Ponderosa lemon, more cold-sensitive than true lemons, the fruit are thick-skinned and very large. Genetic analysis showed it to be a complex hybrid of citron and pomelo.
- Rough lemon, a citron-mandarin cross, cold-hardy and often used as a citrus rootstock
- Sweet lemons or sweet limes, a mixed group including the lumia (pear lemon), limetta, and Palestinian sweet lime. Among them is the Jaffa lemon, a pomelo-citron hybrid.
- Volkamer lemon, like the rough lemon, a citron-mandarin cross

== In art and culture ==
Lemons appear in paintings, pop art, and novels. A wall painting in the tomb of Nakht in 15th century BC Egypt depicts a woman in a festival, holding a lemon. In the 17th century, Giovanna Garzoni painted a Still Life with Bowl of Citrons, the fruits still attached to leafy flowering twigs, with a wasp on one of the fruits. The impressionist Edouard Manet depicted a lemon on a pewter plate. In modern art, Arshile Gorky painted Still Life with Lemons in the 1930s.

In India, a lemon may be ritually encircled around a person in the belief that it repels negative energies. It is a common practice for Hindu owners of a new car to drive over four lemons, one under each wheel, crushing them during their first drive. This is believed to protect the driver from accidents. Hindu deities are sometimes depicted with lemons in their iconography, representing the attribute of wealth or abundance.

In 20th century American self-improvement culture, Dale Carnegie advised readers "if you have a lemon, make a lemonade", meaning to make the best of what you have. In the 21st century, a defective machine such as a car is called a lemon.

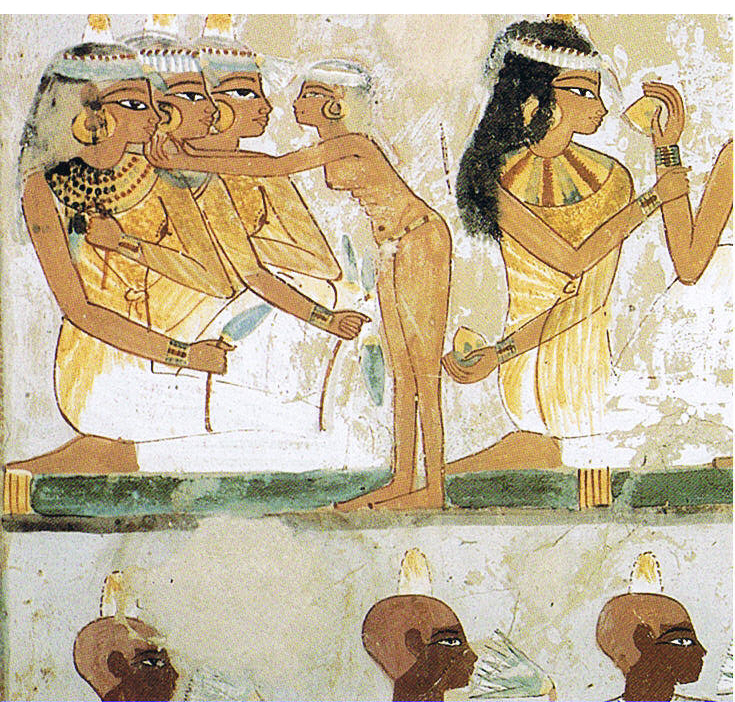
Fresco in the Tomb of Nakht, woman with citrons, 15th century BC

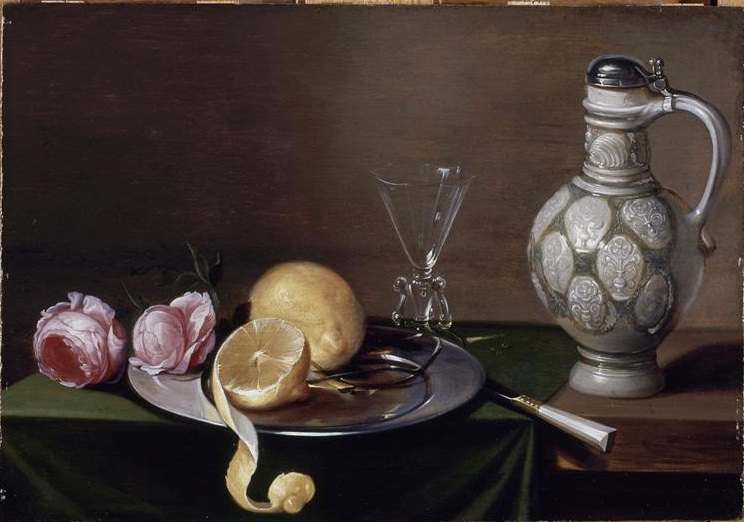
Still life with pitcher, Jacob Foppens van Es, between 1617 and 1666

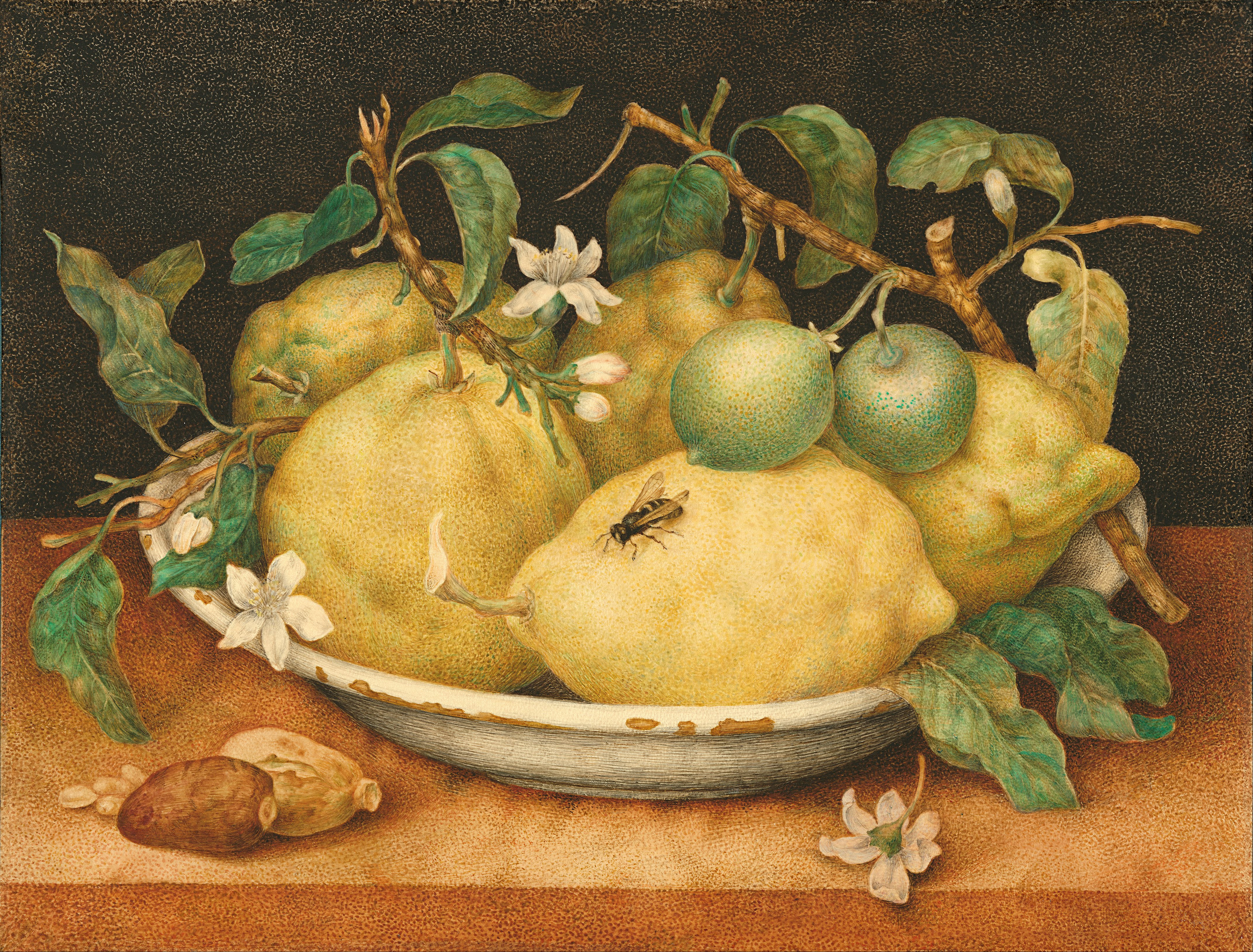
Still Life with Bowl of Citrons, Giovanna Garzoni, late 1640s

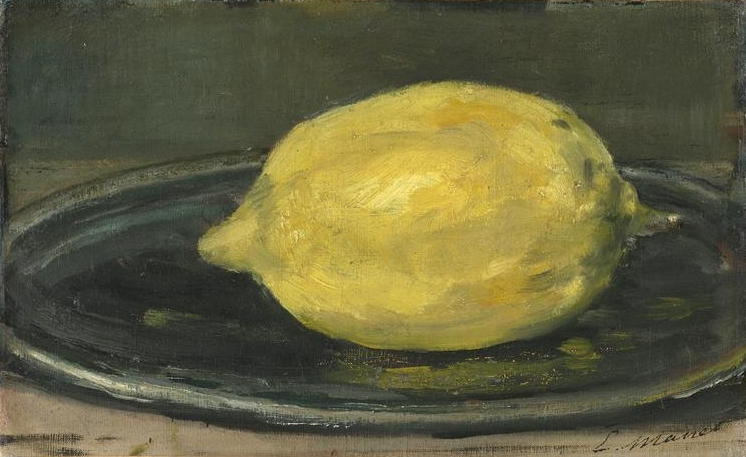
Lemon, Édouard Manet, 1880

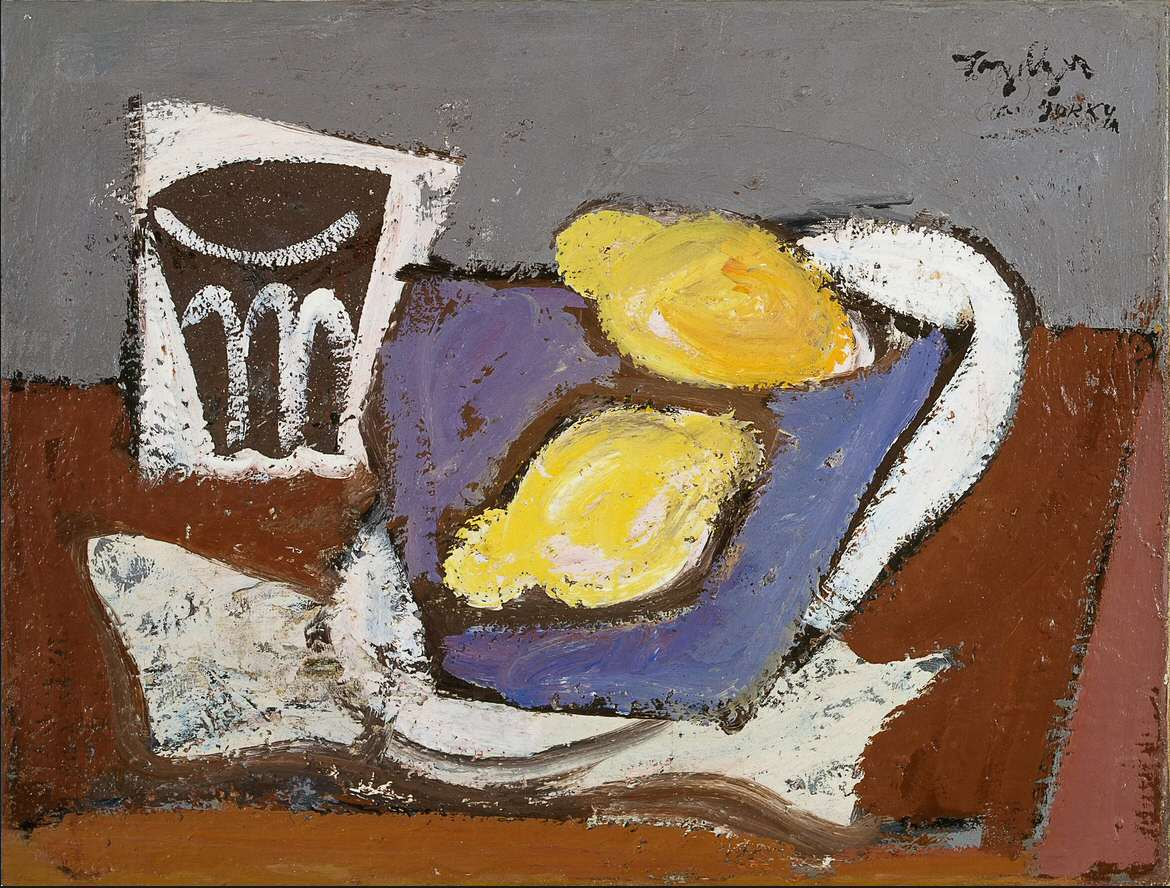
Still Life with Lemons, Arshile Gorky, early 1930s

== See also ==
- Limey – the original ration for British sailors was lemon juice
- List of lemon dishes and drinks
