= Mandarin orange varieties =

Fruit varieties

Mandarin oranges are cultivated in many varieties. These include both the original wild mandarins and many hybrid varieties with other Citrus species.

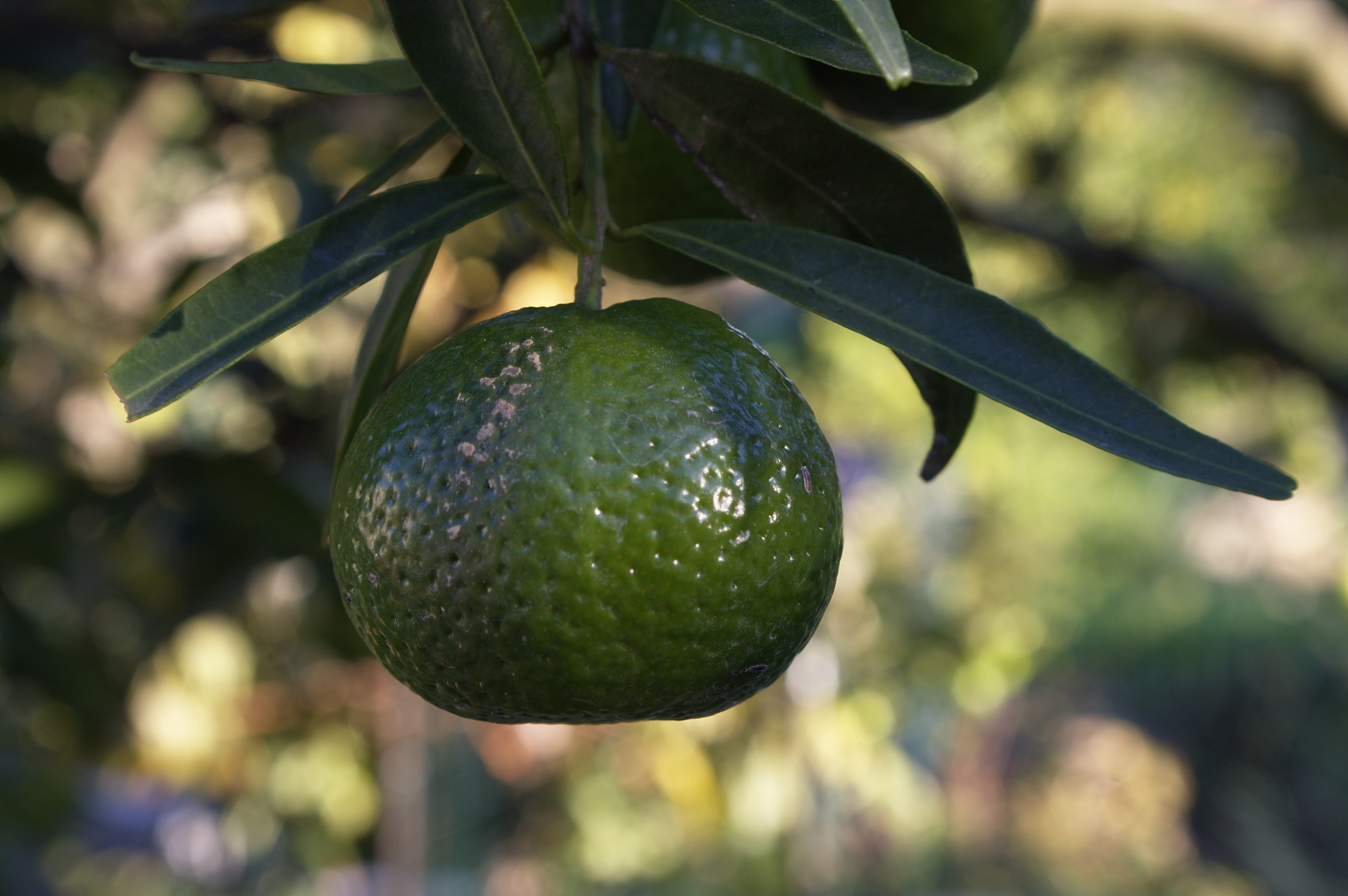
Unripe fruit

== Stem mandarins (Citrus reticulata) ==
- Mangshan wild mandarins (only some, others being the genetically distinct mangshanyegan)
- Daoxian mandarines
- Suanpangan

== Domesticated mandarins and hybrids ==
Species names are those from the Tanaka system. Recent genomic analysis would place them all in Citrus reticulata, except the C. ryukyuensis hybrids

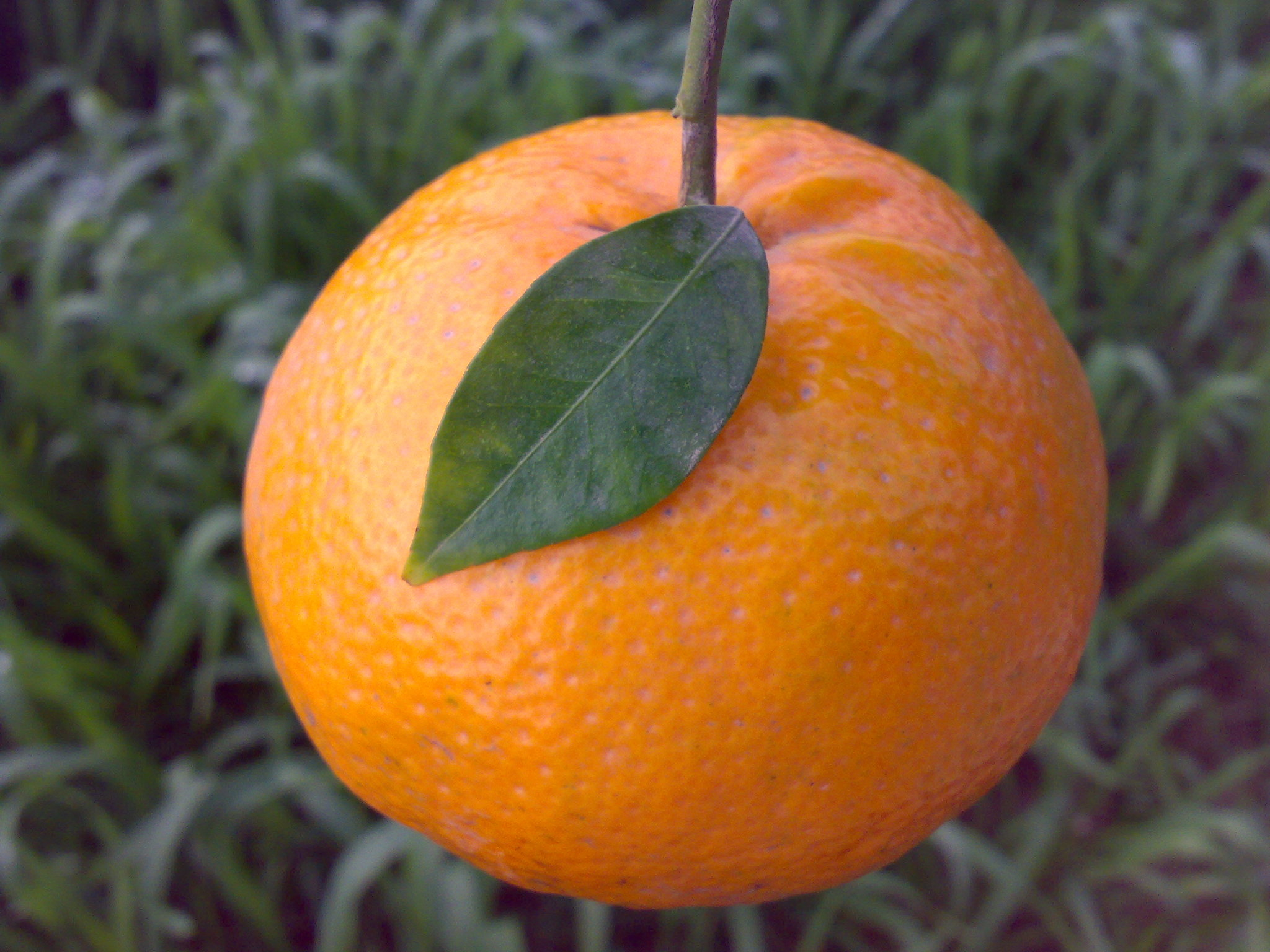
Kinnow, a 'King' (Citrus nobilis) × 'Willow Leaf' (Citrus × deliciosa) cross, developed by Dr H.B. Frost

- Sun Chu Sha
- Nanfengmiju - one of China's most widely cultivated varieties.
- Cleopatra mandarin, acidic mandarin containing very small amount of pomelo introgression.
- Sunki, acidic mandarin containing very small amount of pomelo introgression.
- Tangerines (Citrus tangerina) is a grouping used for several distinct mandarin hybrids. Those sold in the US as tangerines have usually been Dancy, Sunburst or Murcott (Honey) cultivars. Some tangerine × grapefruit hybrids are legally sold as tangerines in the US.
- Mediterranean/Willowleaf/Thorny (Citrus × deliciosa), a mandarin with small amounts of pomelo.
- Dalanghita (Citrus reticulata) is a smaller mandarin endemic widely cultivated in the Philippines. Also known by other local names, naranghita and sintones.
- Huanglingmiao (Citrus reticulata), a mandarin–pomelo hybrid.
- Kishumikan (Citrus reticulata), or simply Kishu, a close clonal relative of Huanglingmiao, the two sharing a common origin before diverging as they were propagated
  - Kunenbo (Citrus nobilis) a heterogeneous group that includes at least four distinct mandarin-pomelo hybrids.
    - King (in full, 'King of Siam', Citrus nobilis) a Kunenbo mandarin with high levels of pomelo admixture, sometimes classed as a tangor.
      - Kinnow (see image), a King × Willowleaf hybrid.
    - Satsuma (Citrus unshiu), a mandarin × pomelo hybrid with more pomelo than seen in most mandarins. It derived from a cross between a Huanglingmiao/Kishu and a non-King Kunenbo that was itself a pomelo × Huanglingmiao/Kishu cross. It is a seedless variety, of which there are over 200 cultivars, including Wenzhou migana, Owari, and mikan; the source of most canned mandarins, and popular as a fresh fruit due to its ease of consumption
      - Owari, a well-known Satsuma cultivar that ripens during the late autumn
  - Komikan, a variety of Kishumikan
- The Ponkan (Citrus reticulata), a mandarin–pomelo hybrid
  - The Dancy tangerine (Citrus tangerina) is a hybrid, the cross of a Ponkan with another unidentified hybrid mandarin. Until the 1970s, most tangerines grown and eaten in the US were Dancys, and it was known as "Christmas tangerine" and zipper-skin tangerine
    - Iyokan (Citrus iyo), a cross between the Dancy tangerine and another Japanese mandarin variety, the kaikoukan.
- Bang Mot tangerine, a mandarin variety popular in Thailand.
- Shekwasha (Citrus depressa), a group of clonal citrus that arose from multiple independent natural crosses of C. ryukyuensis with a Sun Chu Sha relative, a very sour mandarin grown for its acidic juice.
- Tachibana, also a cluster of similar clones, deriving from natural crosses between different individual C. ryukyuensis and a clonal C. reticulata lineage with both northern and southern subspecies contribution.
- Kinnow, also known as Pakistani mandarin, is popular variety in Pakistan and Middle East.

== Mandarin crosses ==
Citrus fruits clustered by genetic similarity. Most commercial varieties of citrus are hybrids of the three species at the corners of the ternary diagram (mandarin at top). Genetically distinct hybrids often bear the same common name.

- Tangelos, a generic term for modern mandarin (tangerine) × pomelo and mandarin × grapefruit crosses
  - The Mandelo or 'cocktail grapefruit', a cross between a Dancy/King mixed mandarin and a pomelo. The term is also sometimes used generically, like a tangelo, for recent mandarin × pomelo hybrids.
- The sour orange (Citrus x aurantium) derives from a direct cross between a pure mandarin and a pomelo
  - Lemon (Citrus x limon), a sour orange × citron hybrid.
    - Lime (Citrus x latifolia), a lemon × Key lime cross
    - Bergamot orange (Citrus x bergamia), a lemon × sour orange backcross
  - Limetta (Citrus limetta), a distinct sour orange × citron hybrid
- The common sweet orange (Citrus x sinensis) derives from a cross between an impure mandarin and pomelo parents
  - Tangors, or Temple oranges, are crosses between the mandarin orange and the common sweet orange; their thick rind is easy to peel, and its bright orange pulp is sour-sweet and full-flavoured. Some such hybrids are commonly called mandarins or tangerines.
    - Clementine (Citrus × clementina), a spontaneous hybrid between a Willowleaf mandarin orange and a sweet orange. sometimes known as a "Thanksgiving Orange" or "Christmas orange", as its peak season is winter; an important commercial mandarin orange form, having displaced mikans in many markets.
      - Clemenules or Nules, a variety of Clementine named for the Valencian town where it was first bred in 1953; it is the most popular variety of Clementine grown in Spain.
      - Fairchild is a hybrid of Clementine and Orlando tangelo
    - Murcott, a mandarin × sweet orange hybrid, one parent being the King.
      - Tango is a proprietary seedless mid-late season irradiated selection of Murcott developed by the University of California Citrus Breeding Program.
    - Kiyomi (Citrus unshiu × sinensis) is a Satsuma/sweet orange hybrid from Japan
      - Dekopon, a hybrid between Kiyomi and ponkan, marketed in the United States as Sumo Citrus(R)
  - Grapefruit (Citrus x paradisi), the result of backcrossing the sweet orange with pomelo
  - Meyer lemon (Citrus x meyer), a cross between a mandarin × pomelo hybrid and a citron.
  - Palestinian sweet lime (Citrus x limettioides), a distinct (mandarin × pomelo) × citron hybrid
- Rangpur lime (Citrus x limonia), a pure-mandarin × citron cross
- Rough lemon (Citrus x jambhiri), a pure-mandarin × citron cross, distinct from rangpur
- Volkamer lemon (Citrus volkameriana), a pure-mandarin x citron cross, distinct from rangpur and rough lemon
- Jabara (Citrus jabara), a Kunenbo mandarin × yuzu cross.
- several of the kumquat-hybrid Citrofortunella, including calamansi, citrangequat, orangequat, mandarinquat and sunquat

== Non-mandarins ==
- Mangshanyegans, long thought to be mandarins, are a separate species.
