= Setoka =

Seedless and highly sweet Japanese citrus fruit

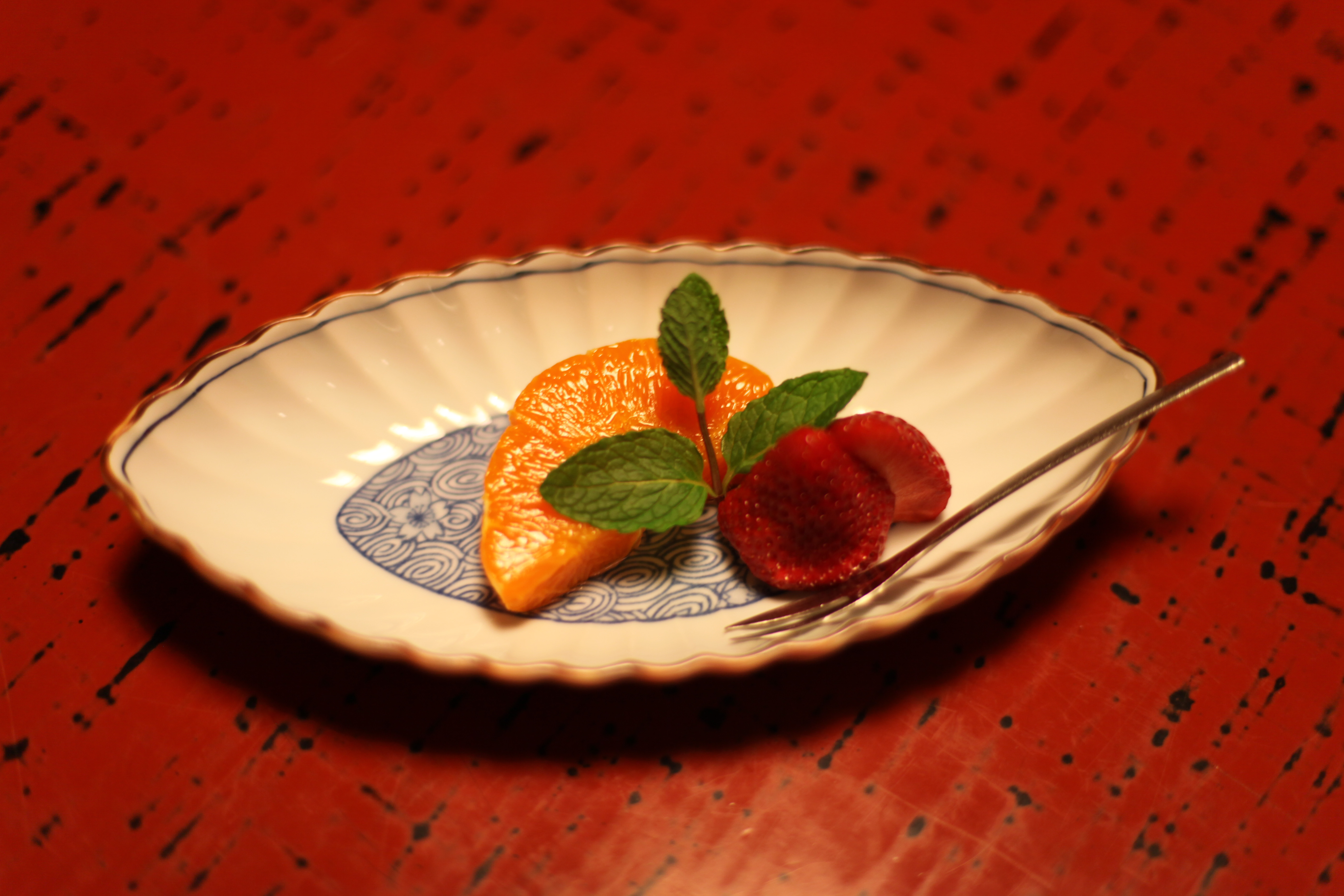
Setoka orange segment served with strawberry and mint as 12th course of a kaiseki dinner at the Hiiragiya Ryokan in Kyoto

Setoka (せとか, Setoka) is a seedless and highly sweet Japanese citrus fruit that is a tangor, a hybrid of the Murcott tangor with "Kuchinotsu No.37", which in turn is a hybrid of the Kiyomi tangor and a King tangor/Willowleaf mandarin cross, "Encore No. 2". It was registered as "Tangor Nōrin No.8" in 1998 and as "Variety registration No.9398" under the Plant Variety Protection and Seed Act in 2001. It weighs 200–280 g (7.1–9.9 oz) and has an oblate shape. The rind is thin and easily peelable. Its flavor is pleasant, aromatic, and similar to the Murcott. The fruit ripens in February. Its sugar level is very high at 12–13 °Bx whereas its citric acid is low (0.8–1.0%).

== In South Korea ==
In South Korea, Setoka is called Cheonhyehyang (Korean: 천혜향, 天惠香). Starting from 2000s, Cheonhyehyang has been farmed in the warm Jeju Island. From mid-2010s however, global warming has allowed Cheonhyehyang to be cultivated as far north as North Chungcheong province.

== See also ==
- Reikou, a Citrus cultivar of similar origin
