= Reikou =

Citrus fruit and plant

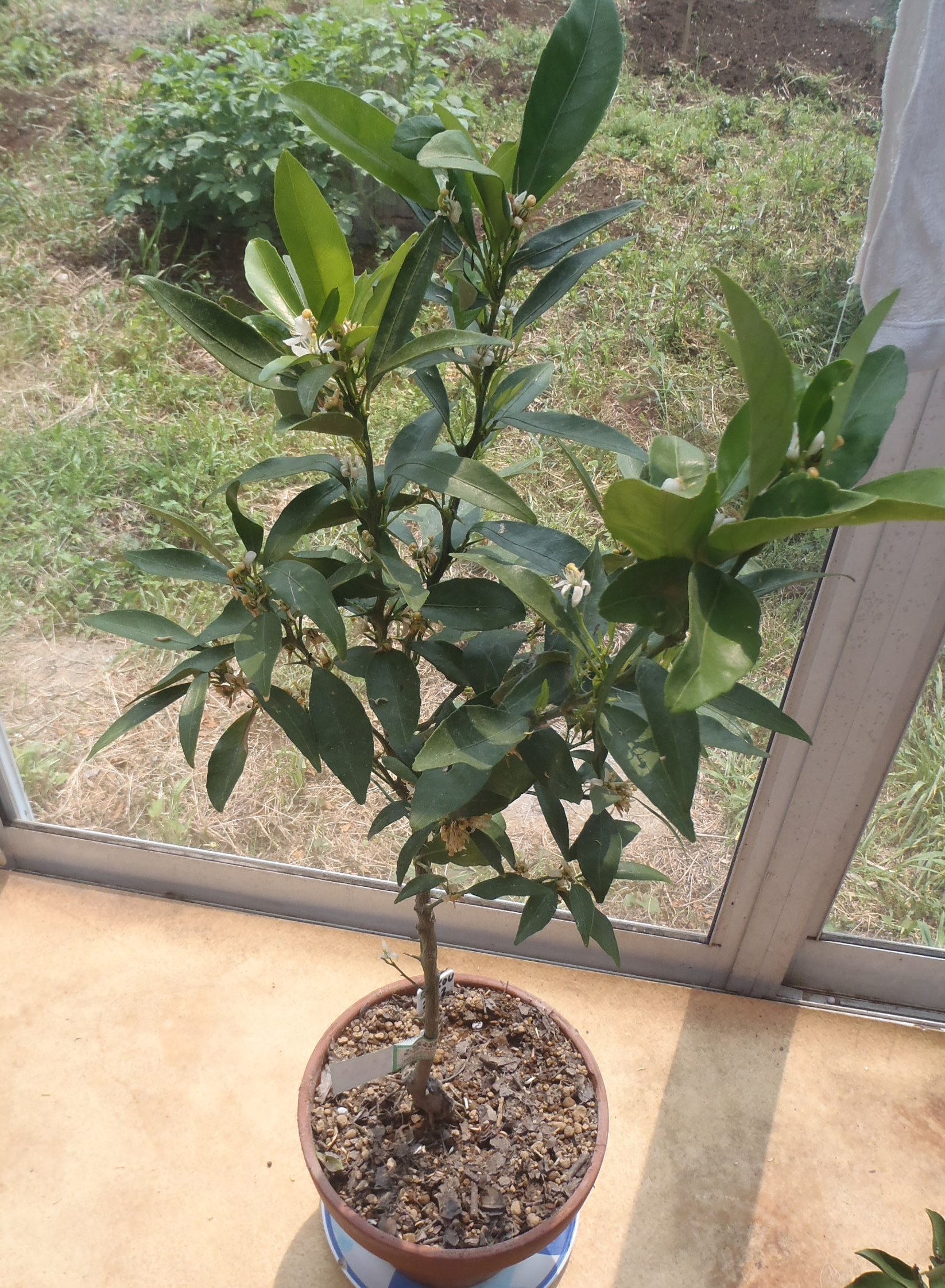
Reikou tree grown as a pot plant

Reikou (麗紅, reikō) is a cultivar of tangor. It is a citrus hybrid of a hybrid of Kiyomi and Encore (Kiyomi–Encore No. 5) and Murcott tangor.

== Description ==
The fruit can be easily peeled by hand. It has a sugar content of between 12% and 13%, with some fruits reaching 15%. The fruit weighs around 210 grams (7.4 oz), relatively large for a tangor, and is a reddish-orange colour. It fruits in late January. It does not produce pollen, so it must be pollinated by another species of citrus.

Its systematic name is Kankitsu Kuchinotsu 32 Gō (カンキツ口之津32号) after Kuchinotsu, Nagasaki where it was bred. It was hybridized in 1984, with its name registered in 2004 and the variety registered in 2005. The first fruits came on sale in 2007.

== See also ==
- Setoka
- Tsunonozomi
