= Tsunonozomi =

Fruit tree cultivar

- Genus: Citrus
- Species: Citrus reticulata
- Hybrid parentage: Kiyomi × Encore
- Cultivar: Tsunonozomi
- Origin: Kuchinotsu, Nagasaki, Japan

Tsunonozomi is a tangor cultivar grown in Japan.

== Genetics ==
Tsunonozomi was created by crossing the 'Kiyomi' tangor (C. unshiu × C. sinensis) with the 'Encore' mandarin (C. nobilis × C. deliciosa).

== Hybrids ==
It is a parent of the setoka along with the 'Murcott' tangor, and is closely related to the Japanese reikou.

== Description ==
The tree has moderate vigor and a shape between upright and spreading. It has a lower alternate-bearing degree than the 'Benibae' and 'Encore' cultivars. It has a higher resistance to citrus scab caused by Elsinoë fawcettii than the satsuma mandarin, but has a low resistance to citrus canker caused by Xanthomonas citri, similar to a navel orange. Stem pitting due to citrus tristeza virus is minor. The fruit is oblate in shape and weighs around 180 grams (0.40 pounds). The rind is orange in color, around 2.4 millimeters thick and has a medium peelability. The surface texture of the rind is slightly rough. It does not puff. The flesh is moderately soft and juicy and has a flavor similar to that of 'Encore'. It contains a moderate number of seeds. It ripens in late December. It contains a moderately high Brix content at 12% and has an acidity of <1g/100mL when ripe. The β-cryptoxanthin content is similar to that of a satsuma, at 1.82 mg/100g.

== Background and development ==
'Tsunonozomi' was developed as part of Japan's National Citrus Breeding Program, which is conducted at the National Institute of Fruit Tree Science (NIFTS) at their Kuchinotsu Citrus Research Station and Okitsu Citrus Research Station. The entities operate as part of the National Agriculture and Food Research Organization (NARO). The process was initiated in 1974. 'Tsunonozomi' was first selected in 1985 and underwent extensive evaluation in Japan's 9th citrus selection national trial starting from 2001, involving 31 experimental stations across the country. This process culminated in its formal authorization and naming as Mikan Norm No. 18 'Tsunonozomi' in March 2012. Prior to this, it was designated Kankitsu Kuchinotsu No.37 and was officially registered under Japan's Plant Variety Protection and Seed Act in May 2011.

== See also ==
- Japanese citrus
- List of citrus fruits
