= Fairchild tangerine =

Hybrid citrus fruit

- Species: Citrus reticulata
- Hybrid parentage: Clementine mandarin x Orlando tangelo
- Breeder: J. R. Furr from the U.S Date and Citrus Station in 1964.
- Origin: Indio, California, United States

The Fairchild tangerine is a cross between a Clementine mandarin and an Orlando tangelo. The skin is thin with a deep orange color, is somewhat pebbly, and doesn't peel as easily as some other tangerines. It is juicy with a rich and sweet flavour and contains seeds. It is a popular variety in the United States, available from October until the middle of January and especially during the winter holidays. The Fairchild tangerine is one of California's most heavily planted varieties.

Fairchild tangerines are sometimes found with the stem and leaves still attached. The Chinese believe the stems and leaves attached to the tangerine are a symbol of prosperity and good luck.

== See also ==
- Mandarin orange
- Citrus taxonomy
