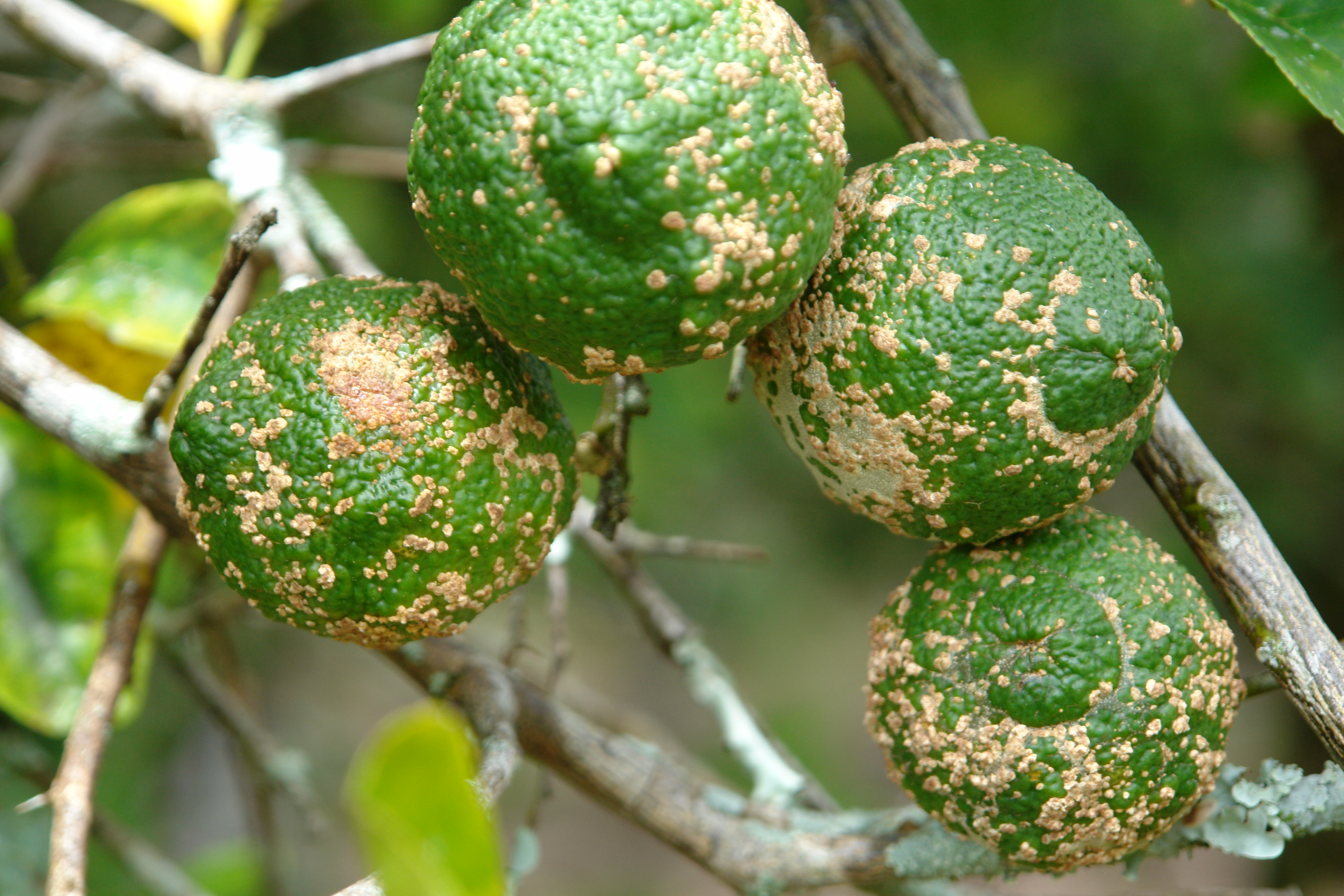
- Elsinoë fawcettii on rough lemon fruit

Scientific classification
- Kingdom: Fungi
- Division: Ascomycota
- Class: Dothideomycetes
- Order: Myriangiales
- Family: Elsinoaceae
- Genus: Elsinoë
- Species: E. fawcettii

Binomial name
- Elsinoë fawcettii Bitanc. & Jenkins [as 'fawcetti'] (1936)

Synonyms
- Sphaceloma citri (E.E.Butler) Cif. (1938); Sphaceloma fawcettii Jenkins (1925); Sporotrichum citri E.E.Butler (1925)

= Elsinoë fawcettii =

Species of fungus

Elsinoë fawcettii is a species of ascomycete fungus in the family Elsinoaceae.

This fungus is an economically important plant pathogen of citrus that causes citrus scab disease. The pathogen infects young fruit, leaves, and shoots, producing corky lesions that reduce fruit quality and marketability. Citrus scab occurs in humid citrus-growing regions worldwide and can result in substantial economic losses in susceptible cultivars.

Four-week-old culture of Elsinoë fawcettii growing on half-strength potato dextrose agar (PDA). The colony exhibits characteristic pinkish pigmentation and a cerebriform appearance. (Own work.)

== History ==
The asexual state of the citrus scab pathogen was originally described as Sphaceloma fawcettii by Jenkins in 1925. Studies conducted in Florida during the late 1920s documented its development on several citrus hosts, including sour orange, grapefruit, and Tahiti lime, and suggested that the pathogen had been present in the region since at least the late nineteenth century. The sexual state was subsequently described as Elsinoë fawcettii by Bitancourt and Jenkins in 1936.

Under the modern "One Fungus, One Name" nomenclatural system, Elsinoë is the accepted genus and Sphaceloma is treated as its anamorphic synonym.

== Morphology ==
Elsinoë fawcettii produces both sexual and asexual reproductive structures. The sexual state forms asci containing hyaline, septate ascospores approximately 5–6 × 10–12 μm, whereas the asexual state (Sphaceloma) produces hyaline, unicellular, ellipsoidal conidia measuring approximately 3–4 × 4–8 μm that may also reproduce by budding. Hyphae are subcuticular or intraepidermal and form pseudoparenchymatous stromatic tissue bearing clusters of short conidiophores arranged in acervular fruiting structures. In addition to typical conidia, spherical microconidia 1–4 μm in diameter have been reported.

In culture, colonies are slow-growing and may develop convoluted or pulvinate forms. Colonies are typically rose-pink to purple, raised, and cerebriform, with pronounced folds and grooves. The mycelium is hyaline, sparse, septate, and short-branched, frequently producing tufts of erect aerial hyphae.

Species of Elsinoë are often difficult to distinguish based on morphology alone, and identification frequently relies on host association and molecular markers because closely related species may produce similar lesions and reproductive structures.

== Symptomatology ==
During infection, the fungus develops both intercellularly and intracellularly within host tissues. Disease development results in the formation of characteristic erumpent, wart-like lesions composed of fungal and host tissues. Lesions occur primarily on young leaves, shoots, twigs, and fruit.

Symptoms vary according to citrus genotype and the developmental stage of the infected tissue. Initial lesions appear as small, irregular, roughened spots that become elevated as the surrounding tissue expands. Young lesions may be pale yellow to light brown and progressively darken with age. On leaves, raised pustules on one surface may correspond to depressions on the opposite surface, and severe infection can result in distortion of the leaf blade. Similar corky or scab-like lesions develop on twigs and fruit. On grapefruit and sweet orange, lesions may appear comparatively flattened and corky.

== Ecology ==
Elsinoë fawcettii is a plant-pathogenic fungus associated primarily with citrus and other members of the family Rutaceae. It colonizes young, actively growing tissues, including expanding leaves, shoots, and developing fruit, where infection may result in reduced growth, leaf distortion, fruit blemishing, fruit drop, and, in severe cases, shoot dieback.

The pathogen has a polycyclic disease cycle, producing multiple infection cycles during a growing season. Infection occurs primarily on young tissues, and acervuli formed in lesions produce conidia that serve as secondary inoculum. Conidia are dispersed mainly by rain splash and irrigation water, while prolonged periods of leaf wetness, high humidity, and warm temperatures favor repeated infection and disease development.

Susceptibility varies substantially among citrus species and cultivars. Reported hosts include lemon (C. limon), grapefruit (C. paradisi), mandarins (C. reticulata), satsuma mandarin (C. unshiu), clementine (C. clementina), and numerous interspecific citrus hybrids. Susceptible cultivars and rootstocks include 'Temple' and 'Murcott' tangors, 'Minneola' tangelo, rough lemon (C. jambhiri), sour orange (C. aurantium), Cleopatra mandarin (C. reshni), and 'Rangpur' lime.

== Management and Control ==
The management relies on an integrated approach combining cultural and chemical control measures. Sanitation practices, including the removal of infected plant material, the use of disease-free nursery stock, and pruning to enhance air circulation, can help reduce inoculum levels and disease spread.

Because disease development is favored by prolonged moisture and high humidity, practices that reduce leaf wetness are important for prevention. Fungicides, including copper-based products, Bordeaux mixture, and several systemic fungicides, are commonly applied to protect developing foliage and fruit during periods conducive to infection. Timely applications have been shown to improve disease suppression and maintain fruit quality.

== Phylogeny ==
Elsinoë fawcettii belongs to the family Elsinoaceae within the order Myriangiales and the class Dothideomycetes. Multilocus analyses based on sequences of the internal transcribed spacer (ITS) region, the large subunit ribosomal RNA gene (LSU), translation elongation factor 1-alpha (TEF1-α), and the second largest subunit of RNA polymerase II (RPB2) have consistently separated E. fawcettii from closely related citrus pathogens such as E. australis, despite their similar morphology, host range and disease symptoms.

Broader phylogenetic studies of the genus have shown that E. fawcettii belongs to a well-supported lineage of scab-causing pathogens and that host specialization has likely played an important role in the diversification of the genus.

Molecular analyses have also revealed substantial genetic variation among E. fawcettii isolates, supporting the recognition of multiple pathotypes associated with differences in host range and pathogenicity. Recent phylogenetic analyses confirmed that geographically distinct isolates of E. fawcettii form a well-supported monophyletic lineage within the genus. Despite being recovered from multiple host species and regions, the analyzed isolates showed relatively limited genetic divergence.

== Genetics and Genomics ==
The genome of E. fawcettii has been sequenced, revealing a assembly of approximately 24.4 Mb organized into 11 chromosomes and containing nearly 10,000 predicted protein-coding genes. Analyses identified numerous candidate effector proteins, carbohydrate-active enzymes, cell wall-degrading enzymes, and secondary metabolite biosynthetic gene clusters that may contribute to pathogenicity, host adaptation, and host specificity.

Pan-genome analyses suggest that E. fawcettii possesses a relatively conserved gene repertoire. Rather than relying extensively on gene gain or loss, adaptation appears to occur primarily through changes in gene regulation and expression, which may facilitate colonization of diverse hosts and contribute to variation among isolates.

== Pathotypes ==
E. fawcettii exhibits considerable intraspecific variation in host specificity. Earlier studies recognized distinct biotypes based on differential pathogenicity among citrus hosts, and subsequent pathogenicity studies identified multiple pathotypes. At least six named pathotypes have been recognized based on differential-host assays.

These pathotypes differ in their ability to infect particular citrus hosts and include the Florida broad host range (FBHR), Florida narrow host range (FNHR), Tryon's, Lemon, Jingeul, and SRGC pathotypes. Molecular analyses of isolates from several citrus-producing countries have confirmed extensive genetic diversity within the species and have demonstrated that pathotype differentiation is supported by DNA-based markers, including ITS and TEF gene sequences.

== Secondary metabolites and pathogenicity ==
Genomic analyses identified 22 putative secondary metabolite biosynthetic gene clusters, including the elsinochrome biosynthetic cluster and several additional clusters with similarity to known fungal toxin pathways, suggesting that E. fawcettii may produce a broad range of bioactive compounds.

The polyketide synthase gene EfPKS1 plays a key role in elsinochrome biosynthesis and fungal virulence, demonstrating the importance of these toxins in disease development.

Elsinochromes are red to orange pigments and polyketide-derived secondary metabolites that function as light-activated phytotoxins. They are non-host-selective and, following photoactivation, interact with molecular oxygen to generate reactive oxygen species. These reactions promote membrane lipid peroxidation, electrolyte leakage, and ultimately necrosis of host tissues.

== Geographic distribution ==
Global distribution of Elsinoë fawcettii based on CABI records.

The pathogen is most frequently associated with warm, humid regions where rainfall favors dispersal of conidia and disease establishment.

E. fawcettii has been reported from more than 80 countries and territories across Africa, Asia, Europe, North and South America, and Oceania, particularly in tropical and subtropical citrus-growing areas. Major citrus-growing regions where the pathogen occurs include Brazil, China, India, South Africa, Australia, and the southeastern United States.

The geographic spread of E. fawcettii has been associated with movement of infected plant material.

== Relevance for humans ==
Citrus scab is an economically important disease of citrus because the corky lesions produced by E. fawcettii reduce the cosmetic quality and marketability of fresh fruit, resulting in economic losses and increased production costs associated with disease management and fungicide applications.

Although the lesions are generally superficial and do not affect the internal quality of the fruit, severe infections can lead to fruit blemishing, premature fruit drop, and reduced commercial value, particularly in fresh-fruit markets.

The pathogen is also of phytosanitary importance because the international movement of infected nursery stock, propagative material and fruits can facilitate its introduction into previously unaffected citrus-growing regions. Consequently, E. fawcettii is regulated as a quarantine pest in several jurisdictions, including the European Union, where it is listed under Regulation (EU) 2019/2072.
