= Natalie's Orchid Island =

Fruit juice company based in Florida

Natalie's Orchid Island Juice Company is an American fruit juice company based in Fort Pierce, Florida, that was founded in 1989.

== Company history ==
The company was founded in 1989 by Marygrace Sexton, whose husband was a 4th-generation Florida citrus grower based on the family land along the Indian River. Marygrace and her husband reformed the family's primarily packing-oriented operation to produce freshly-squeezed juice, and in November 1990 landed the new company's first distribution deal with Carnival Fruit of Miami. After a boom of rapid growth, Marygrace turned to her family (the Martinellis) for assistance, and they helped her turn her fledgling outfit into a major juice production facility based out of Fort Pierce, Florida.

The company was acquired by Perricone Farms in September 2024.

Today, the company's products can be found in 30 states and 24 countries, and is a ten-time recipient of the America's Best Tasting Fresh Florida Juice Award. The company is certified by the Women’s Business Enterprise National Council.

== Products ==
Natalie's offers the following juices and drinks:

- Orange juice
- Blood orange juice
- Grapefruit juice
- Honey tangerine juice
- Tomato juice
- Orange beet juice
- Orange cranberry juice
- Orange mango juice
- Orange pineapple juice
- Pumpkin Apple spice juice
- Carrot tomato celery juice
- Lemonade
- Strawberry lemonade
- Half and Half
- Lemon juice
- Lime juice
- Margarita mix
- Sweet and Sour Blend
