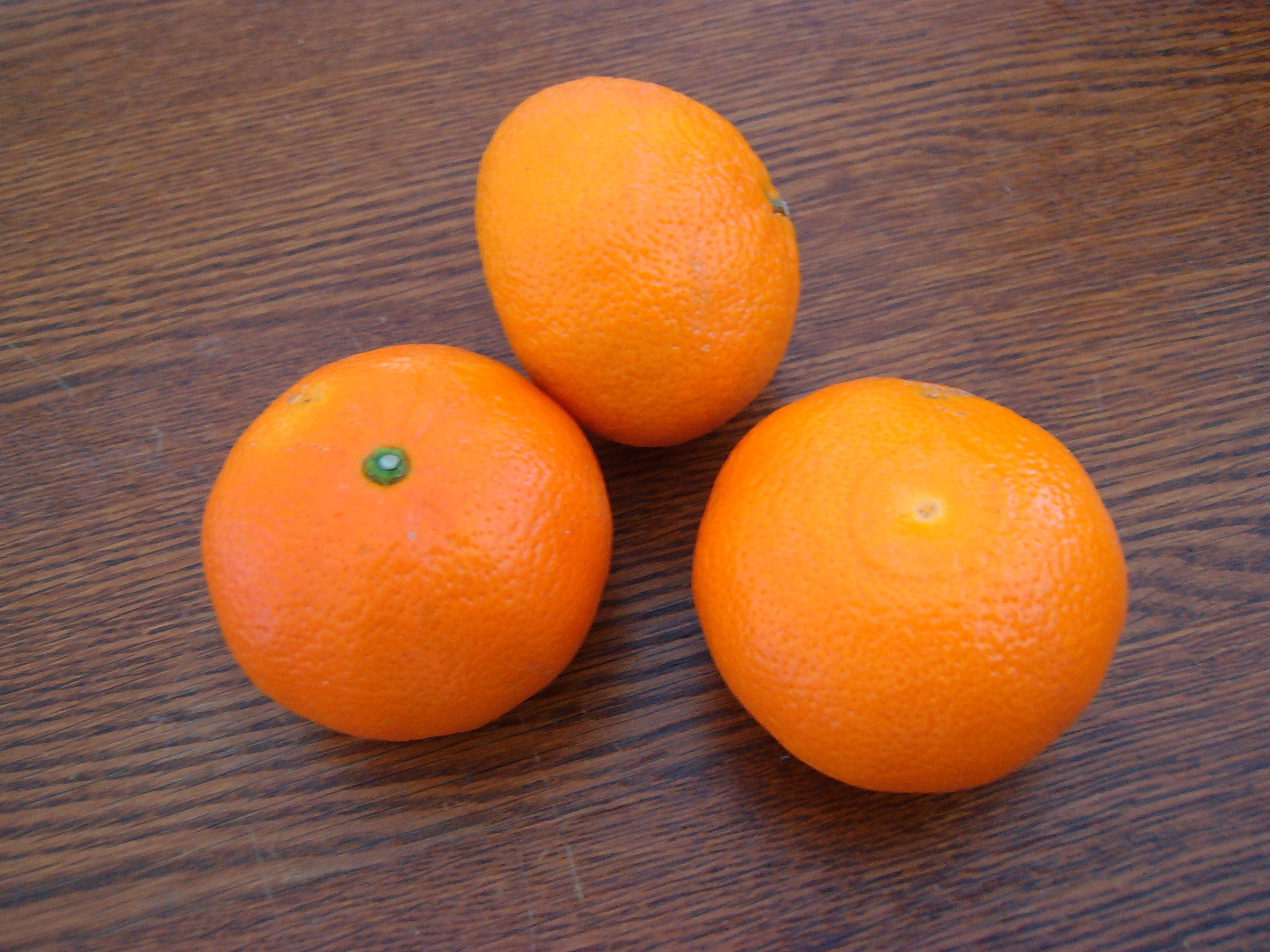
- Ortanique

Scientific classification
- Kingdom: Plantae
- Clade: Tracheophytes
- Clade: Angiosperms
- Clade: Eudicots
- Clade: Rosids
- Order: Sapindales
- Family: Rutaceae
- Subfamily: Aurantioideae
- Genus: Citrus
- Species: C. reticulata × C. sinensis

= Tangor =

Citrus fruit cross between mandarin and sweet orange

The tangor (C. reticulata × C. sinensis) is a citrus fruit hybrid of the mandarin orange (Citrus reticulata) and the sweet orange (Citrus sinensis). The name "tangor" is a formation from the "tang" of tangerine and the "or" of "orange." Also called the temple orange, its thick rind is easy to peel and its bright orange pulp is sour-sweet and full-flavoured. The name "temple orange" is taken from the name of citrus magnate William Chase Temple.

== Varieties ==
Tangors are purposely bred or accidental hybrids of the sweet orange (Citrus sinensis) and the mandarin (Citrus reticulata), producing several varieties.

- 'Clementine' (Willowleaf × unknown sweet orange) (a commercially important cultivar)
- 'King' ("King of Siam"; formerly Citrus nobilis)
- 'Tsunonozomi' (Kiyomi x Encore)
- 'Murcott' ("honey Murcott"; "Murcott honey orange"; "red"; "big red")
- 'Ortanique' (originally found in Jamaica, the name comes from the words "orange", "tangerine", and "unique"). In 1939, David Daniel Phillips was recognised by the Jamaica Agricultural Society (JAS) as the creator of the ortanique.
- 'Temple' (Willowleaf × unknown sweet orange) (believed to be the same as the "magnet" variety of Japan)
- 'Umatilla' (misnomer "Umatilla tangelo")
- 'Pontianak' (originally found in Indonesia, named after a provincial capital)
- 'Setoka' (Japan, hybrid of Murcott and Kuchinotsu No.37)
- 'Gonggan' (China)

=== Satsuma tangors ===
- 'Iyokan' (Miyagawa × unknown sweet orange)
- 'Miyauchi Iyo' (early-ripening Iyo mutant)
- 'Othani Iyo' (late-ripening Miyauchi mutant)
- 'Kiyomi' (Miyagawa × Trovita navel orange)
- 'Seto' (Sugiyama Unshiu × Trovita navel orange)
- 'Reikou' ((Kiyomi x Encore) x (No. 5 x Marcott))

== Cultivation regions ==
Since the 19th and early 20th centuries, tangors have been cultivated in tropical and warm temperate world regions, such as southern Japan, Florida, Caribbean islands, South Africa, and Malaysia.

== Pests and diseases ==
The 'Ortanique' variety may be attacked by aphids (Aphis gossypii), rust mite (Phyllocoptruta oleivora) or various species of scale insects and moths. The fungus Sphaeropsis tumefaciens may cause knots in twigs.
