= Mandelo =

Citrus fruit and plant

- Hybrid parentage: 'Frua' mandarin hybrid × pomelo
- Cultivar: Citrus × paradisi 'Cocktail'
- Origin: Research Center of the University of California, Riverside, United States in 1966

A mandelo (or Mandalo, also known as a "cocktail grapefruit") is a citrus fruit that is smaller than a grapefruit, has yellow or yellow-green coloured skin and bright yellow or yellow-orange flesh, but is sweeter than a grapefruit.

== Origin ==
The mandelo was developed in the 1950s at the UC Citrus Experiment Station, but then escaped into public orchards. It is a yellow-orange fleshed tri-specific citrus hybrid between a 'Frua' hybrid mandarin ('Dancy' mandarin × 'King tangor') and a Siamese Sweet pomelo. This makes it 1/4 King tangor, 1/4 Dancy tangerine, and 1/2 Siamese Sweet Pomelo. It is named for its ancestors, mandarin and pomelo.

== Distribution ==
The fruit normally grows on large and vigorous trees, but in colder situations the trees are smaller. They can grow in the Caribbean and Western United States and Mexico, in various soil types.

== Fruit description ==
The tree is very productive, producing its fruit in clusters from November to February. They vary from the size of an orange to the size of a grapefruit. The fruit has a thin, easy-to-peel, smooth, yellow rind. Its flesh is seedy, bright yellow or yellow-orange in color, and very juicy. The flavor is sub-acid-like.

== Usage ==
Due to its tenderness and high seed content, the mandelo has not achieved great commercial success, but its unique flavor, early and long season, and prolific nature have led to its increasing popularity in backyard orchards in southern California.

Besides being good for eating fresh, 'Cocktail' may be used to make marmalade or jam, candied peel, syrup, or in cocktails and smoothies.
