= Kinnow =

Variety of citrus fruit

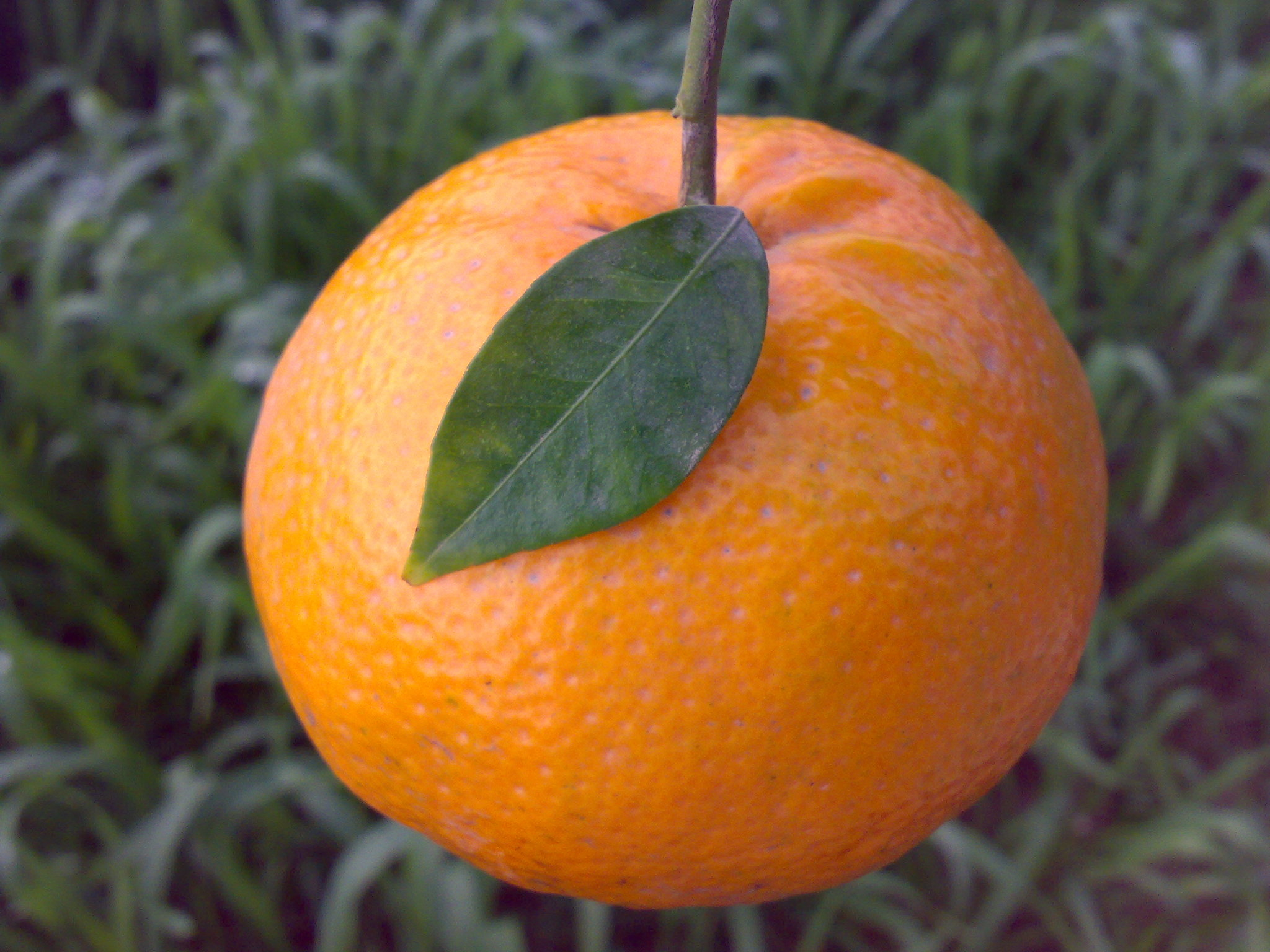
- Kinnow
- Hybrid parentage: 'King' (Citrus nobilis) × 'Willow Leaf' (Citrus × deliciosa)
- Breeder: Howard B. Frost, University of California Citrus Experiment Station in 1935

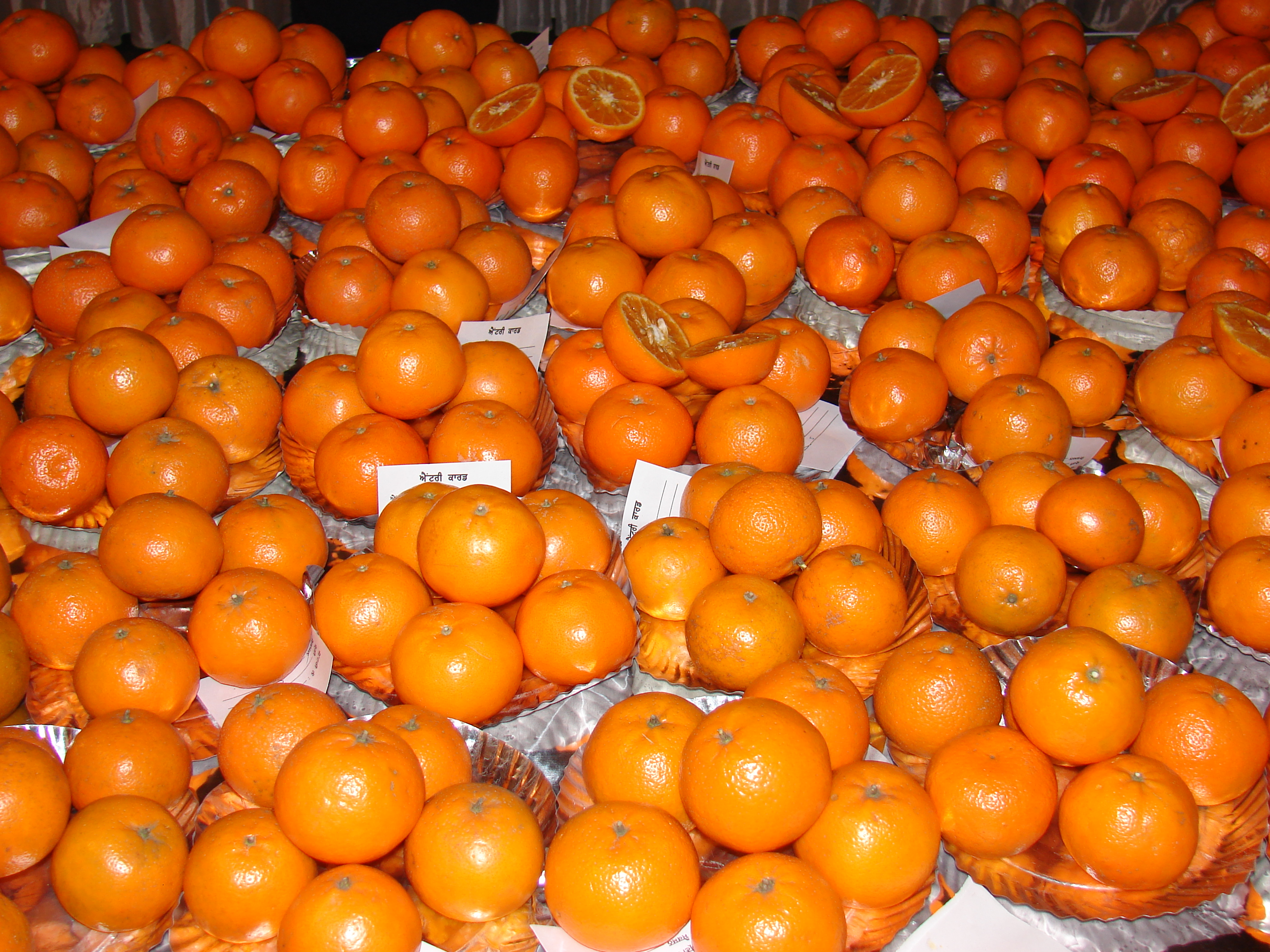
Kinnow

The kinnow is a high yield mandarin hybrid cultivated extensively in the wider Punjab region of India and Pakistan.

It is a hybrid of two citrus cultivars — 'King' (Citrus nobilis) × 'Willow Leaf' (Citrus × deliciosa) — first developed by Howard B. Frost, at the University of California Citrus Experiment Station. After evaluation, the kinnow was released as a new citrus hybrid for commercial cultivation in 1935.

== Description ==
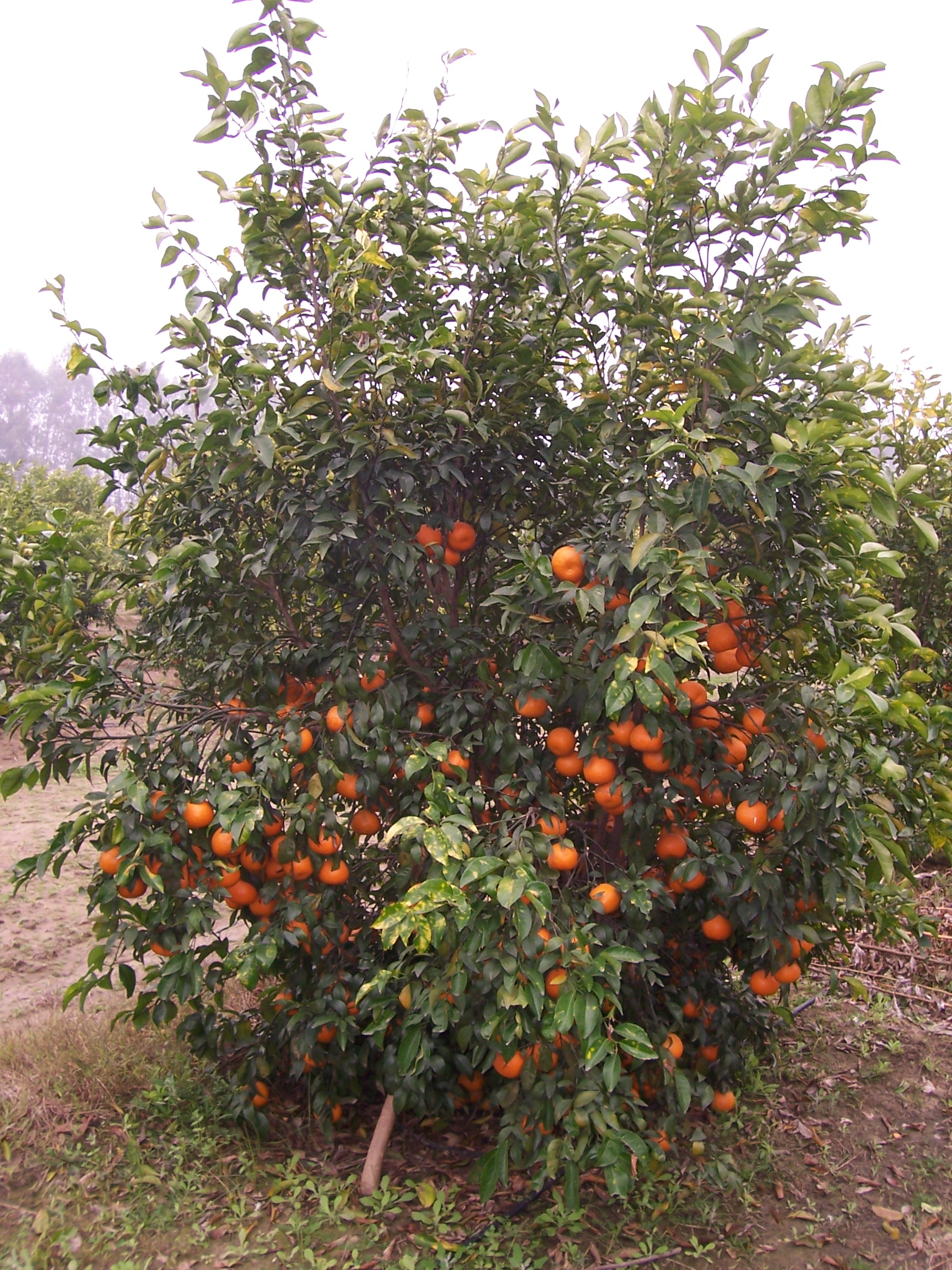
Young kinnow tree bearing fruit

In a hot climate, plants can grow up to 35 feet (11 m) high. Kinnow trees are highly productive; it is not uncommon to find 1,000 fruits per tree.

The fruit matures in January or February. It peels easily and has a high juice content, no knives required by consumers. For harvesting, use of sharp pruning shears is recommended to carefully cut the kinnow fruit close to its stem only during dry weather. Harvesting during high humidity weather is not advised as moisture can lead to fruit skin splitting or damage to the fruit.

== Seedless kinnow/low seeded kinnow ==
The high seed content in this variety is a major hindrance in out-of-hand eating. Mikeal Roose of University of California, Riverside, USA developed a low seeded kinnow and this variety was released under the name 'Kinnow LS' in the year 2011. In Pakistan, a seedless kinnow has been developed (using the selection method), a team member of the National Agricultural Research Centre (NARC) in Islamabad, Pakistan and the former director of the Citrus Research Institute in Sargodha, Pakistan.

== Export from Asia ==
Most of the target export markets of kinnow from India and Pakistan are those of developing countries. Only 2.6 percent of kinnow exports target the markets of developed countries, which is due to the emerging demand for seedless kinnow by the developed countries. About 61 percent of total world exports of oranges and mandarins are of seedless varieties. Some important export markets for kinnow are: Iran, Bahrain, United Arab Emirates, Kuwait, Oman, Qatar, Saudi Arabia, Indonesia, Malaysia, Afghanistan, Netherlands, Philippines, Singapore, the United Kingdom, Russia, Vietnam, United States and Canada. Indonesia has also offered market access to kinnow from Pakistan at zero per cent.

Over 40% of the Pakistani exports of kinnows went to Russia in 2015. Internally, the prices of kinnow in Pakistan dropped more than 50% between 2016 and 2020.

== Harvesting and handling ==
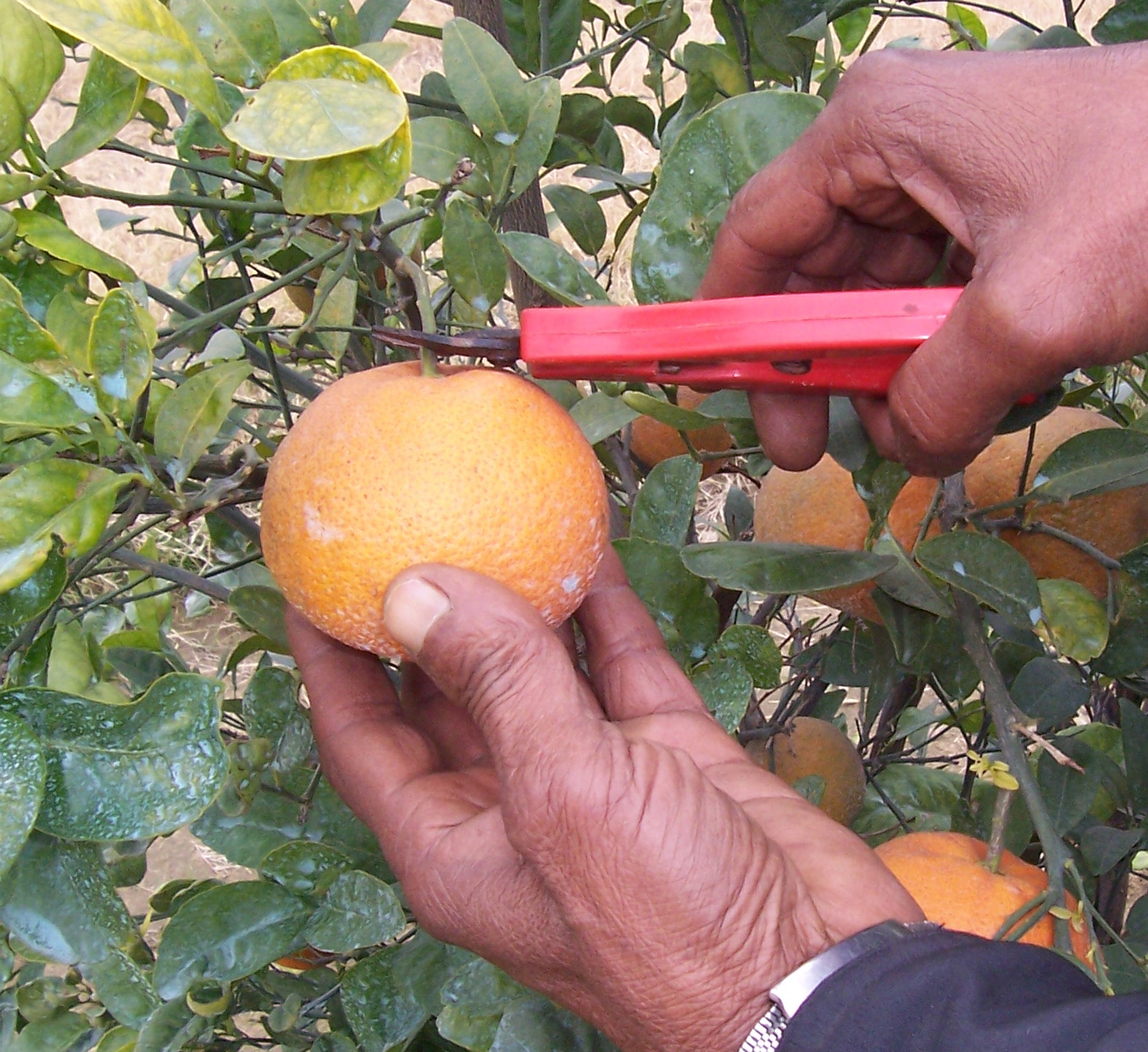
Picking of kinnow with clippers

Kinnow fruit seeds are planted between August and October. Harvesting starts when the fruit's external colour becomes orange, from December to February. The best harvesting time is mid-January to mid-February, when the fruit attains a TSS/acid ratio of 12:1 to 14:1. The fruit quality declines in later pickings. Fruits are harvested by clipping the stem with the help of sharp clippers (secateurs). The stem is cut as short as possible to avoid mechanical injury to the fruit in packing and transits. As it is a comparatively loose rind fruit, harvesting by pulling fruits with one's hands is avoided. Coating kinnow fruits with commercial waxes can increase the shelf life up to 60 days. The fruit can be stored in cold storage at a temperature of 4–5 °C (39–41 °F) and a relative humidity of 85–90%. According to the Agriculture department (Punjab, Pakistan) spokesman, "Improper harvesting methods, like pulling the fruit by hand or shaking branches to drop the fruit, can result in damaged fruit and harm to the tree. To ensure quality, farmers are advised to use pruning shears to carefully cut the fruit close to its stem during dry weather".

Packing of kinnows

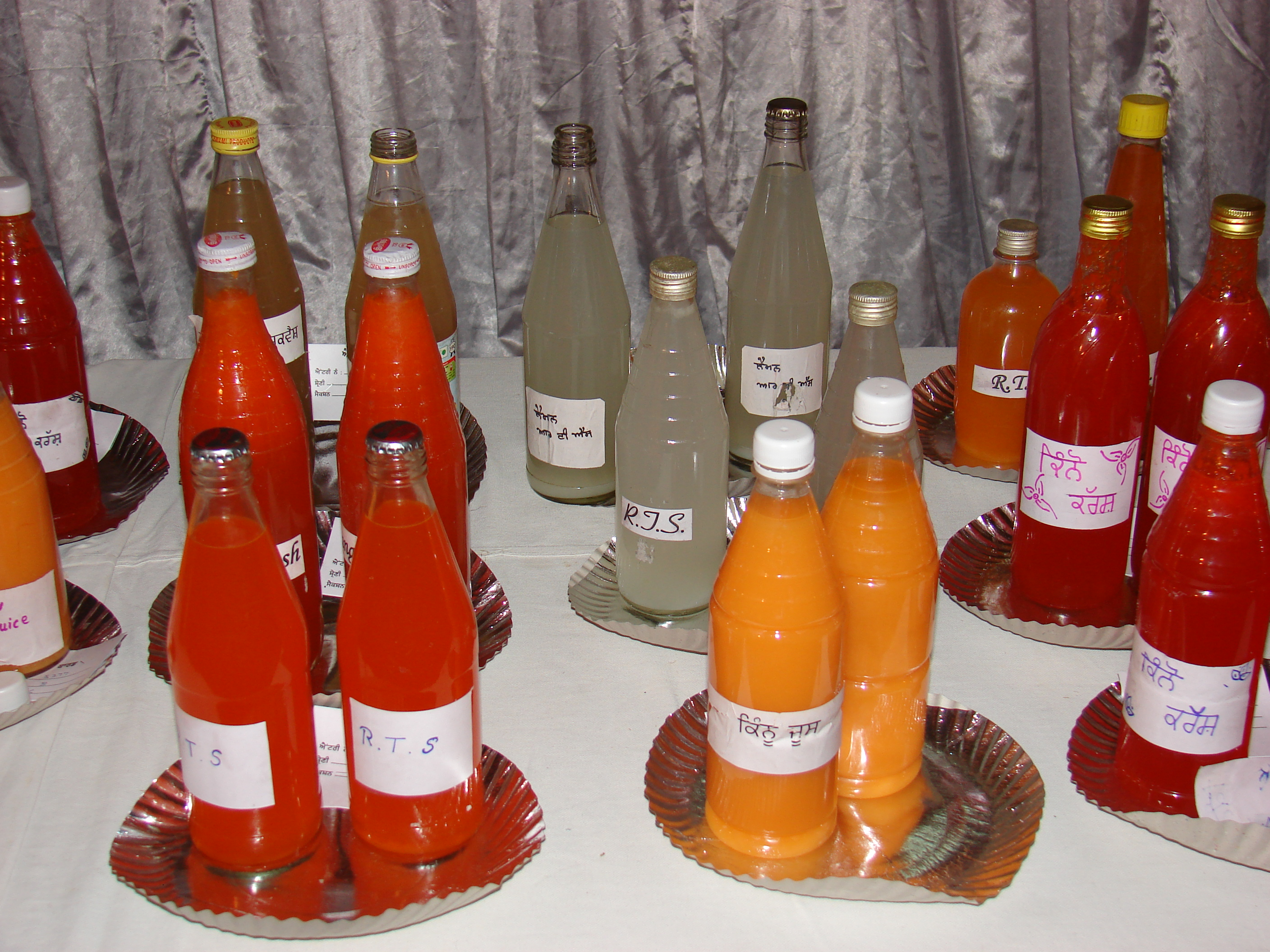
Kinnow products

== Fruit processing ==
Food processing includes the selection of good-quality fruit. The ideal kinnow is firm to slightly soft, smooth-skinned with no deep grooves, and deep orange to almost red. Human hands can better judge and avoid product with soft spots, dull and faded coloring or rough and bumpy skin. Many processing technologies have been developed by state agricultural universities and other research institutes of Pakistan. Kinnow fruits can be stored at room temperature conditions or under cold storage conditions.

== Gallery ==
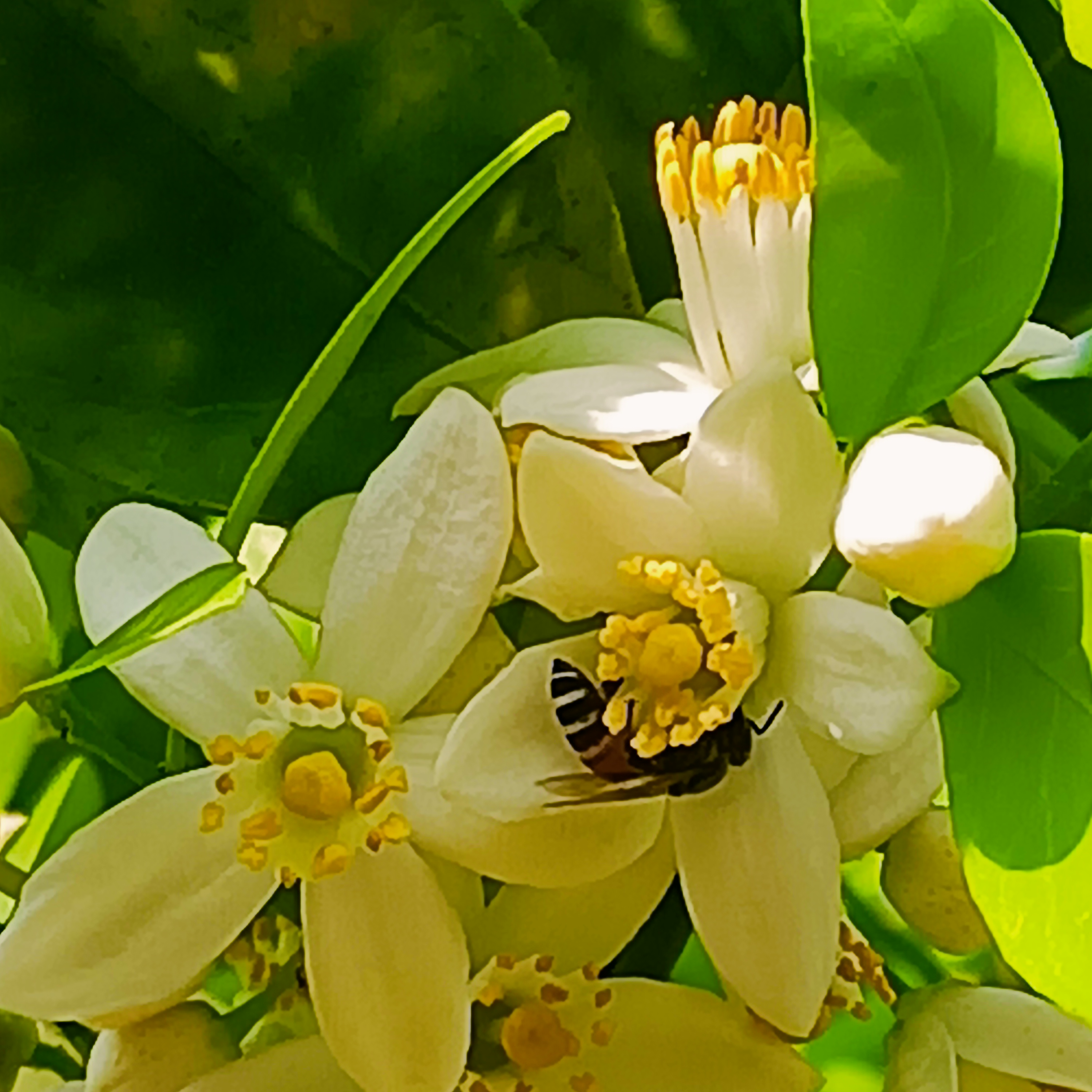
Kinnow Flowers
