= Encore mandarin =

Citrus fruit cultivar

King x Willowleaf 'Encore'
- Hybrid parentage: King × Willowleaf
- Cultivar: 'Encore'
- Origin: California, United States

Encore mandarin is a citrus cultivar.

This cultivar is a hybrid between two mandarin oranges (King x Willowleaf), obtained by H.B. Frost, in California. It began to be commercialized from 1965.

The tree has a characteristic aspect, given by the branches that form an acute angle with the central axis of the tree, without observing pending branches. The fruit is of excellent internal quality, although its vitamin C content is relatively low when compared to an orange. Each fruit can contain 25 or more seeds. In some orchards, the number of seeds is reduced. It has a great tendency to alternate bearing. In the year of high harvest presents low levels of potassium. The fruit can even kill the branches because it is a very strong (the strongest) sink. Sometimes fruit present peel pitting, which is a problem for its commercialization, especially in markets where this fruit is not known. There are orchards where no pitting appear until harvest, or peel pitting is not notorious. Another problem is the fruit splitting in autumn.

It is cultivated in greenhouses in Japan. In Portugal, its area has increased due to the high prices of the fruits.

== Hybrids ==
Encore is a parent of:

- 'Nou 5 gou', (Kishu mikan x Encore)
- 'Tsunonozomi', (Kiyomi x Encore)
- 'Amaka', (Kiyomi x Encore)
- 'Mihocore' (Miho satsuma x Encore)
- 'Tsunokagayaki', ('KyOw No. 14' (Kiyomi x Okitsu Wase satsuma) x Encore)
