= Phyllocoptruta oleivora =

Scientific classification
- Kingdom: Animalia
- Phylum: Arthropoda
- Subphylum: Chelicerata
- Class: Arachnida
- Family: Eriophyidae
- Genus: Phyllocoptruta
- Species: P. oleivora

Binomial name
- Phyllocoptruta oleivora (Ashmead, 1879)

Species of mite

Phyllocoptruta oleivora, the citrus rust mite, is a serious pest of citrus in most humid regions of the world based on incurred damage and annual cost of control. It infests twigs, leaves, and fruit of all citrus species and varieties, but its order of preferences is lemons, grapefruit, oranges, and tangerines.
