= Citrus × deliciosa =

Citrus fruit and plant

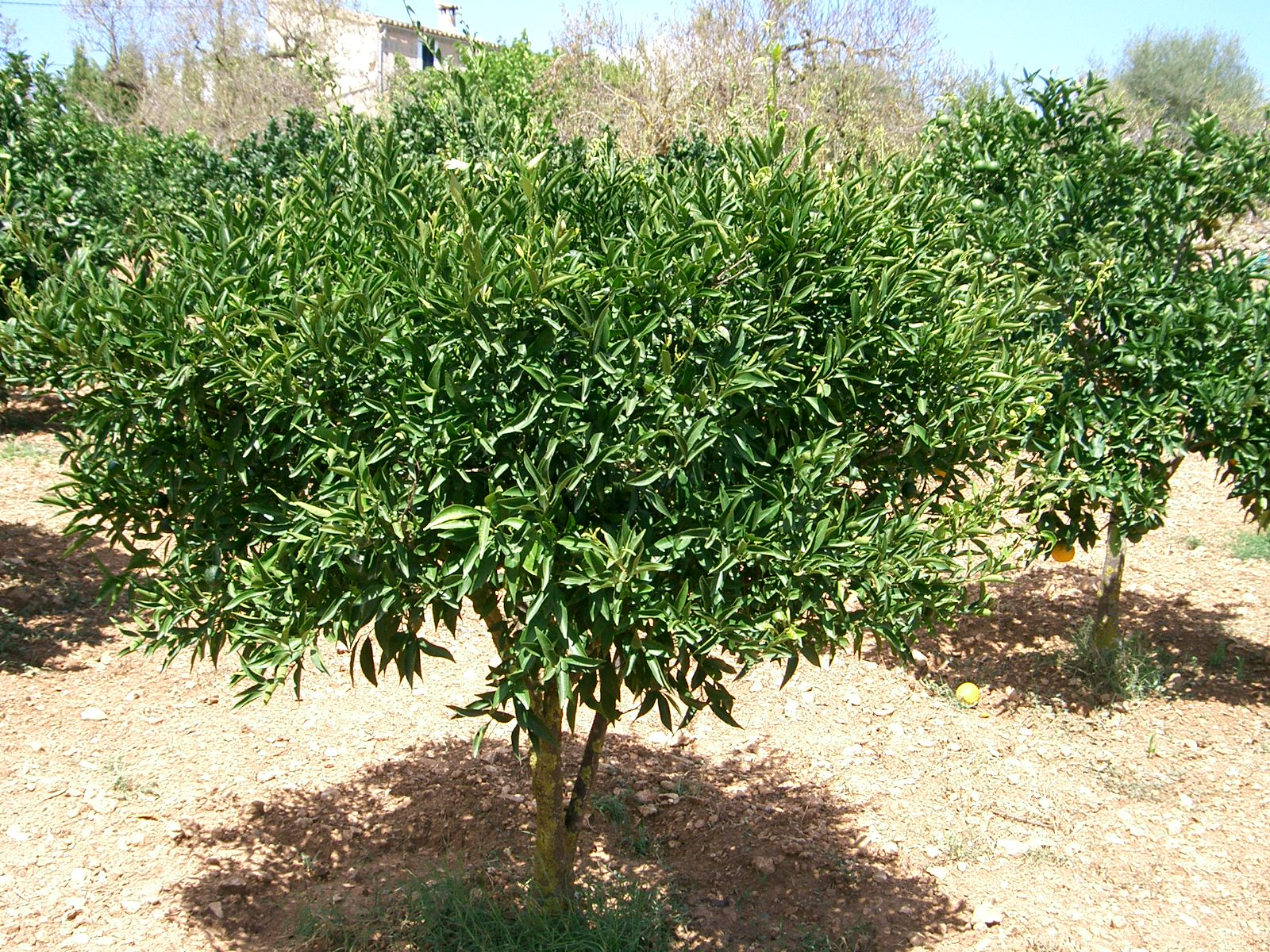
- Hybrid parentage: Parents unknown; mandarin orange with some pomelo ancestry
- Cultivar: "Mediterranean"?
- Marketing names: Willowleaf, Ba Ahmed (Morocco), Blida, Boufarik and Bougie (Algeria), Bodrum (Turkey), Paterno and Palermo (Italy), Nice and Provence (France), Valencia (Spain), Setubalense (Portugal); commune (French), comuna (Spanish), gallego (Portuguese), koina (Greek), yerli (Turkish), and beladi (various spellings, Arabic); Effendi or Yousef Effendi (Egypt and the Near East), Emperor, Avana or Speciale (Italy), Thorny (Australia), Mexerica or Bergamota (Brazil), Montegrina, Natal, and Chino or Amarillo (Mexico).
- Origin: Italy

Citrus × deliciosa (thorny (Australia), amarillo, beladi, Willowleaf Mandarin, Mediterranean Mandarin) is a citrus hybrid mandarin orange with just under 6 % pomelo ancestry. It is related to the ponkan.

It has been widely grown around the Mediterranean since it appeared in Italy (between 1810 and 1818), but was not found in the orient until it was exported there. It is one of the most commercially important citrus. Its sweet fruit is eaten, its rind oil is used to flavour food and drinks, and petitgrain oil is extracted from the pruned leaves. Its flowers (particularly petals) are also rich in essential oils.

== Cultivars ==
- Avana
- Emperor
- Yousef Effendi
- Comuna/commune
- Natal (Mexico)
- Paterno
- Willowleaf (in USA)
- Setubalense

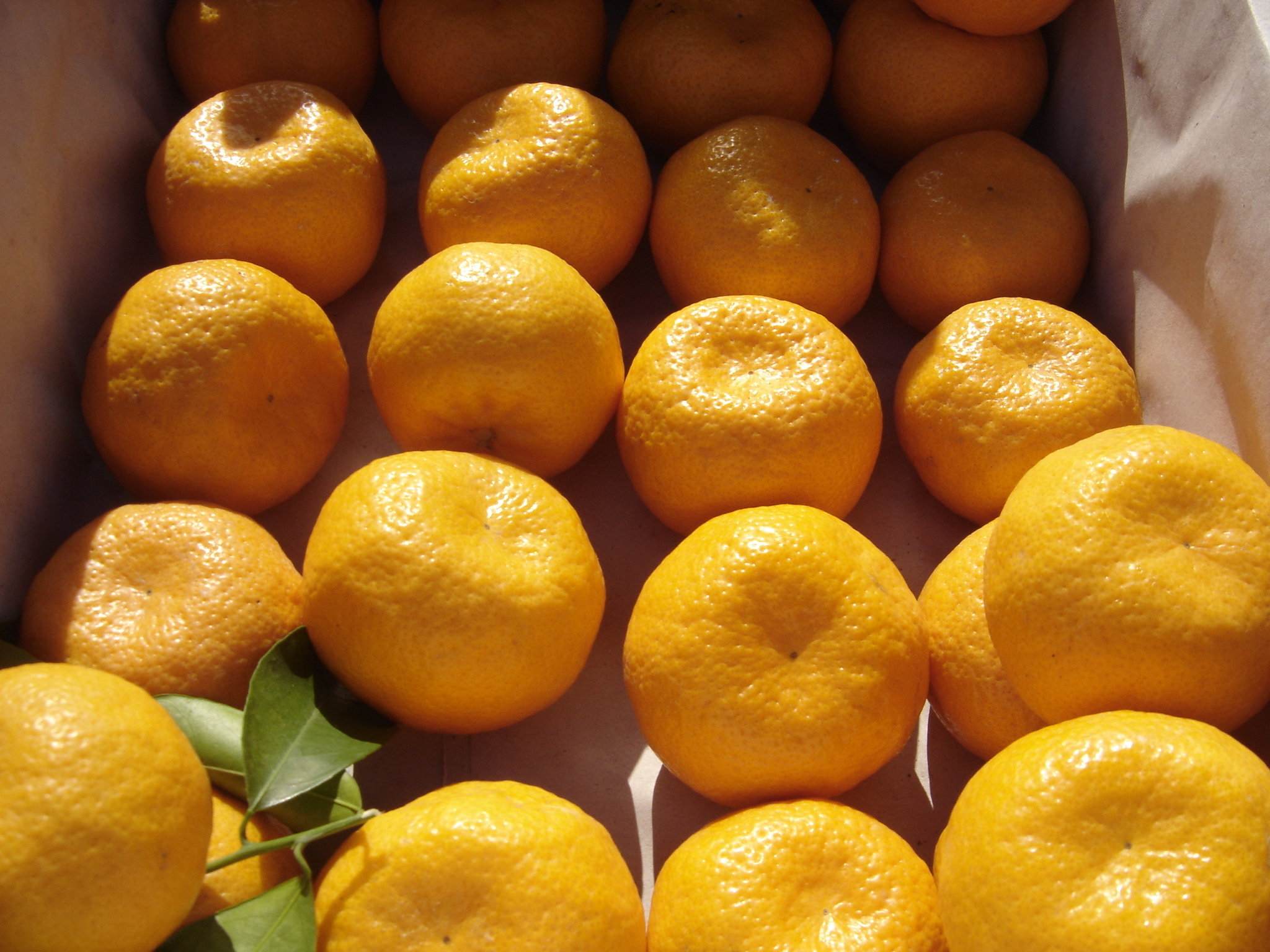
Fruits of the cultivar 'Setubalense'

== Hybrid descendants ==
the Citrus × deliciosa is a parent of some hybrid cultivars like:

- 'Clementine' (Citrus × deliciosa × unknown sweet orange).
- 'Kinnow', (Citrus × deliciosa × King tangor)
- 'Wilking', (Citrus × deliciosa × King tangor)
- 'Encore', (Citrus × deliciosa × King tangor)
- 'Temple', (Citrus × deliciosa × unknown sweet orange)
- 'Cravo', (Citrus × deliciosa × unknown sweet orange)
- 'Amoa 8', (Citrus × deliciosa 'Avana' cultivar x Citrus × sinensis 'Moro' cultivar)
- 'Allspice' tangelo, (Citrus × deliciosa 'Willowleaf' cultivar x Citrus × paradisi 'Imperial' cultivar)
- 'Pearl' tangelo, (Citrus × deliciosa 'Willowleaf' cultivar x Citrus × paradisi 'Imperial' cultivar)
