= Murcott (fruit) =

Citrus fruit

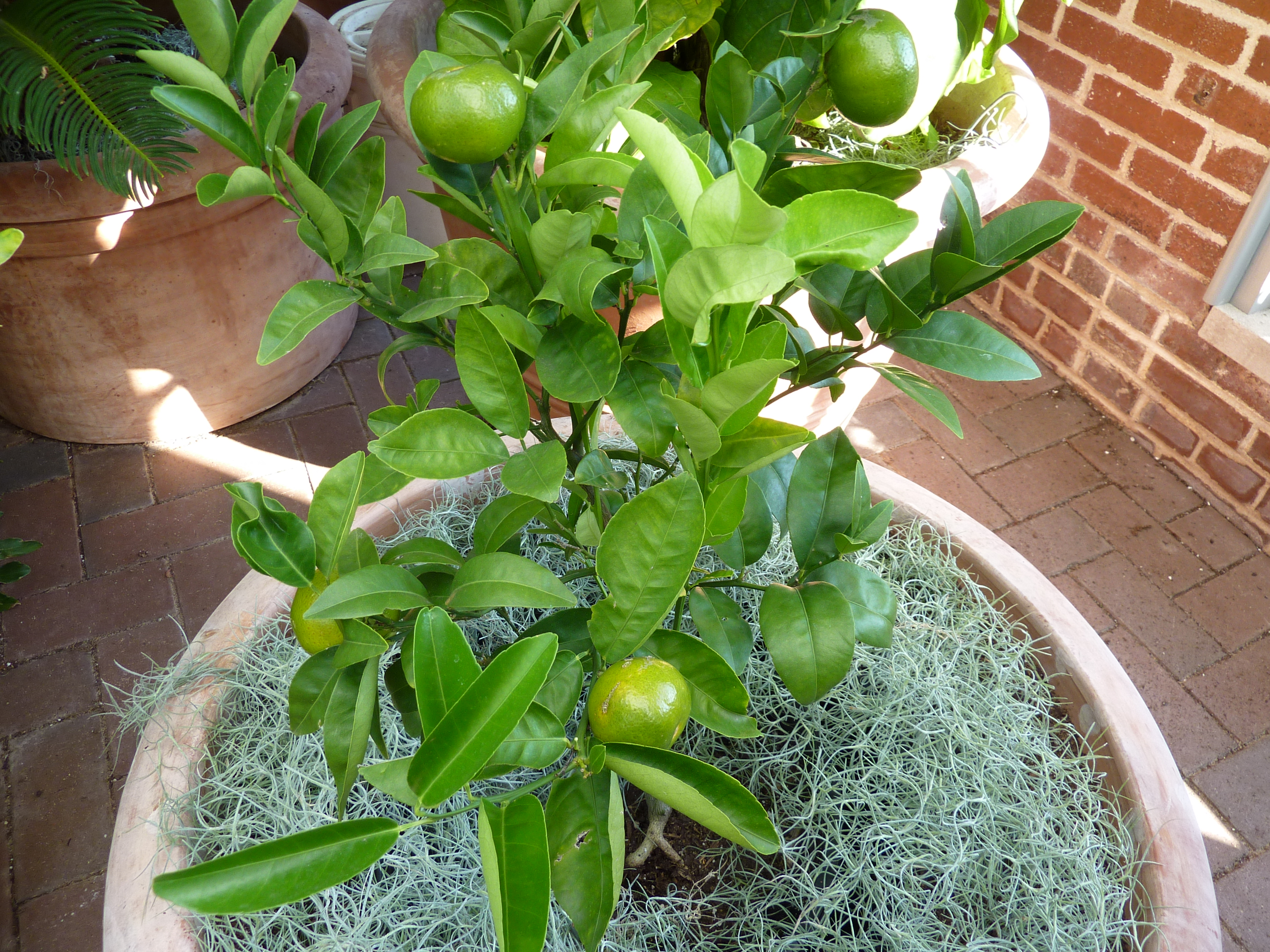
- Citrus x nobilis 'W. Murcott', in the Linnean House of the Missouri Botanical Garden
- Hybrid parentage: Parents unknown; likely a tangor
- Cultivar: Murcott
- Marketing names: 'Honey tangerine'
- Origin: Florida

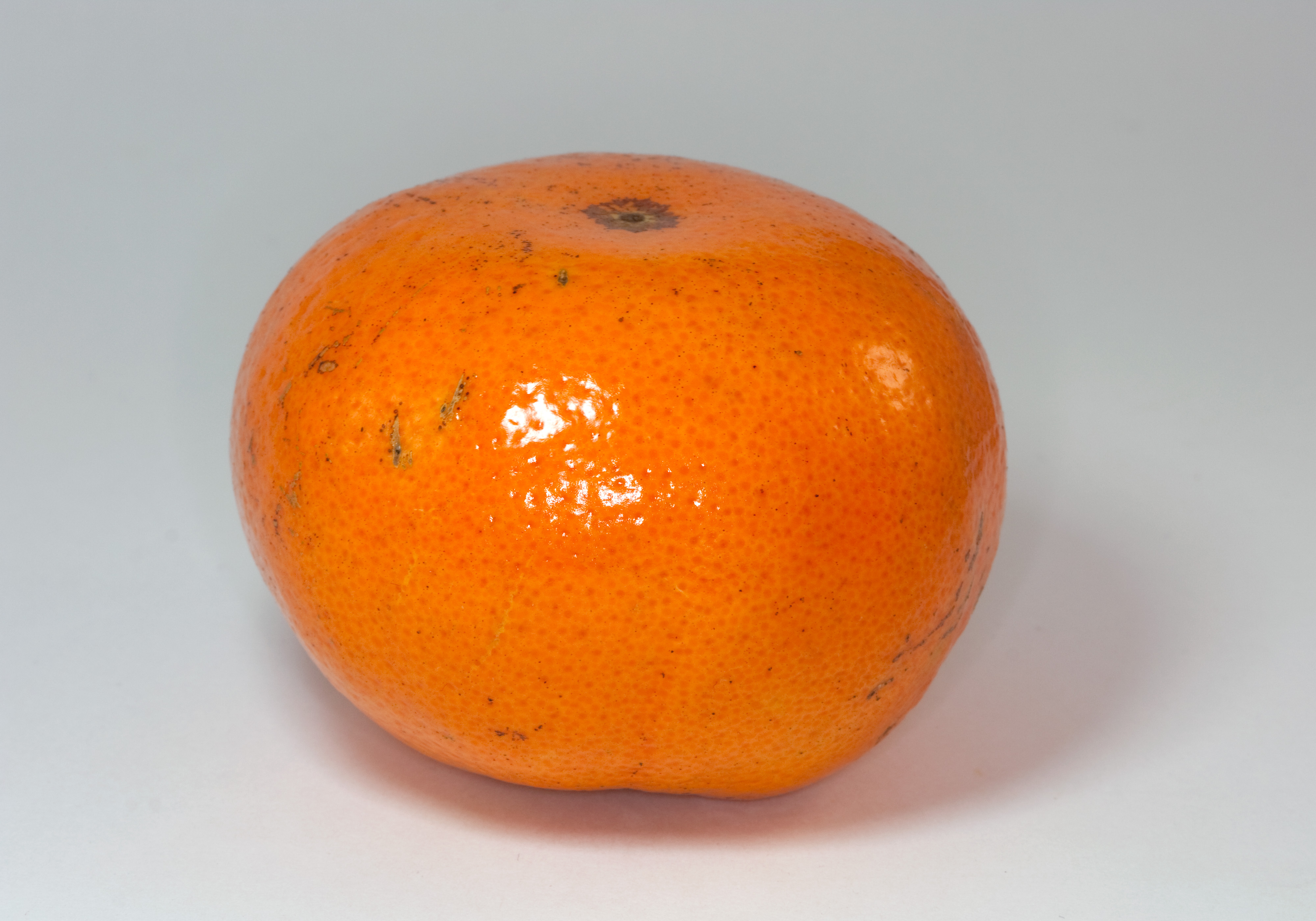
A ripe Murcott fruit

The Murcott (marketed as Honey Tangerine) is a tangor, or mandarin–sweet orange hybrid.

The Murcott arose out of citrus pioneer Walter Tennyson Swingle's attempts to produce novel citrus hybrids. Its seed parent has been identified as the King tangelo; the pollen parent remains to be identified. About 1913, he gave a hybrid tree he had produced at a US Department of Agriculture planting to R. D. Hoyt at Safety Harbor, Florida. Hoyt in turn gave budwood to his nephew, Charles Murcott Smith, for whom the variety was named. Smith was growing the resulting trees in 1922 at his nursery in Bayview, Pinellas County, Florida, now a neighborhood in Clearwater.

The trees grow upright, but often have branches bent or broken by heavy fruiting at the ends.

It is widely grown in Florida, where it matures from January to March. Citrus scab and alternaria fungus disease attack Murcotts.

The Murcott is one parent of the Clementine-like hybrid variously called the Afourer, Nadorcott or W. Murcott cultivar, the other parent being unknown.
