= Cam sành =

Citrus fruit and plant

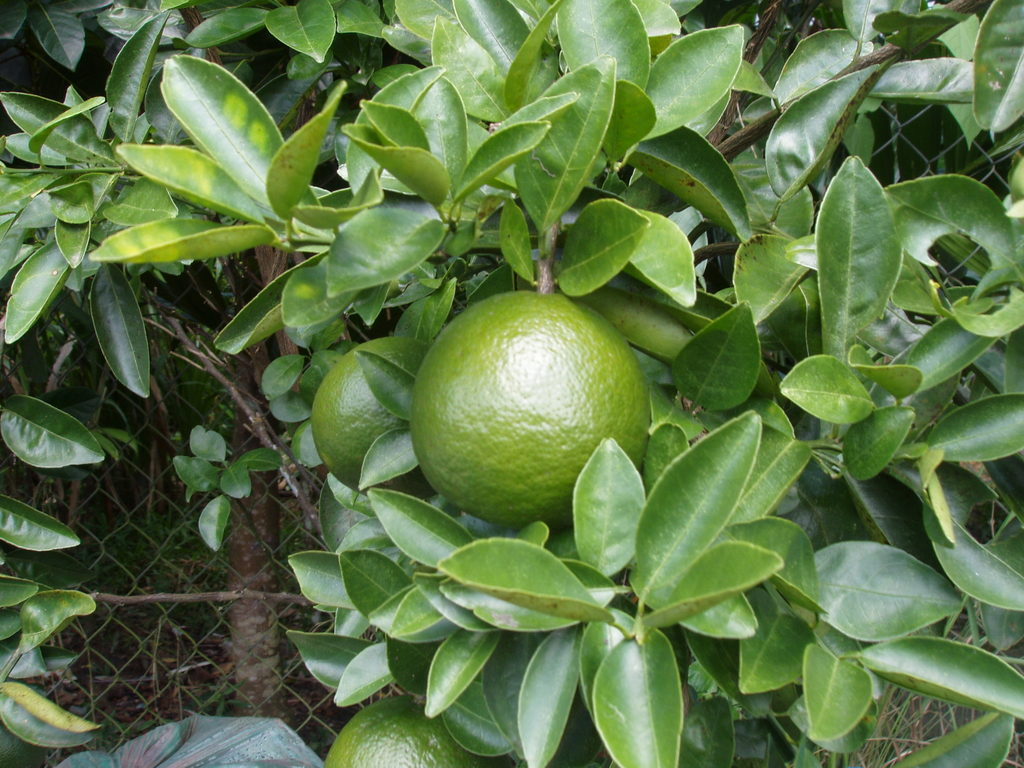
- A cam sành tree
- Genus: Citrus
- Species: Citrus reticulata × sinensis

Cam sành (Vietnamese: [kaːm ʂâjŋ̟]) or King orange (Citrus reticulata × sinensis) is a citrus hybrid originating in Vietnam.

Cam sành is Vietnamese for "terracotta orange", although the fruit is more akin to a mandarin or tangerine. The fruit may be easily recognized by its thick skin, which is typically bright green, although the skin may also be partly green and partly orange, or entirely orange. Its flesh is orange, dark and sweet. This is the most popular orange variety in Vietnam and Cambodia.

== Characteristics ==
The cam sành tree typically grows to around 3 to 3.5 meters high, with an umbrella-shaped canopy typically 3 - 4 meters in diameter. The fruit itself is round with a diameter of 4 - 12 centimeters. The fruit skin is around 5 millimeters thick and green and lumpy when ripe. The flesh has a dark yellow-orange colour with a sweet and sour taste.

== Classification ==
This tree is referred to as the "King Tangor" or "King Mandarin" in most horticultural literature. Budwood for grafting is available through the University of California Citrus Clonal Protection Program. One notable difference is that in temperate climates the fruit will turn a bright orange in response to colder temperatures when the fruits ripen.

It is one among many citrus fruits from the region. These include the closely related yellow cam canh and reddish to yellow cam bo ha mandarin–pomelos hybrids; the orange-colored chun or sen, yellow bak son, and pink hong orange–mandarin hybrids or "king mandarins" (C. reticulata × C. sinensis); as well as at least three non-hybridized mandarin (C. reticulata) varietals. The term "king mandarin" is sometimes applied to the cam sành itself.

== Distribution ==
The tree was introduced to the United States in 1880, when the United States Minister to Japan John A. Bingham arranged for six cam sành fruits to be shipped from Saigon, Cochinchina, to Dr. H. S. Magee, a nurseryman in Riverside, California. In 1882, Magee sent two seedlings and budwood to J. C. Stovin in Winter Park, Florida.

In Vietnam, the tree is cultivated in the Mỏ Cày district, Bến Tre province, as well as the northern mountainous areas. It has also been grown in the Bố Hạ region of Yên Thế (Yên District) of Bắc Giang province, but had been eradicated due to the citrus greening disease. Nowadays, cam sành is planted widely in northeastern Vietnam (particularly Hà Giang, Tuyên Quang, and Yên Bái), as well as in several provinces of the Mekong Delta in the south, including Vĩnh Long, Cần Thơ, and Tiền Giang.

== Cultivation ==
Like most citrus, it can be grafted and marcotted, and various types of rootstock can be used. It can be susceptible to a large variety of tropical citrus diseases, the most serious of which is possibly greening or yellow shoot, which can be mitigated by micro-grafting to eliminate the pathogen, and providing ideal orchard management, with a focus on psylid removal. Other pest insects include citrus leaf miner, green shoot borer, brown stem borer, citrus rust mite, fruit fly and mealy bugs. It prefers alluvial soil, and a cool, moist climate, but is widely adaptable, and does well at comparatively high altitudes. Yield is high, with an average fruit weight of 150–250 g (5.3–8.8 oz). Although climatic conditions are not favourable to produce high quality oranges for fresh consumption in Southern Vietnam, the tropical climate favours vigorous growth, and sweet fruit. This would be ideal for orange juice production and Cam Sanh produced from the South supplies high demand of people in the North.
