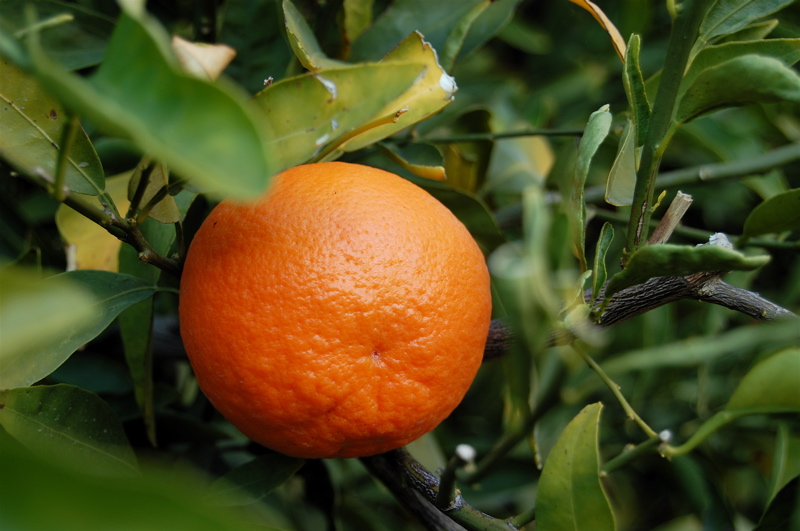

Scientific classification
- Kingdom: Plantae
- Clade: Tracheophytes
- Clade: Angiosperms
- Clade: Eudicots
- Clade: Rosids
- Order: Sapindales
- Family: Rutaceae
- Genus: Citrus
- Species: C. × tangerina

Binomial name
- Citrus × tangerina Tanaka

= Tangerine =

Orange-colored citrus fruit

The tangerine is a type of citrus fruit that is orange in colour, that is considered either a variety of the mandarin orange (Citrus reticulata), or a closely related species, under the name Citrus tangerina, or yet as a hybrid (Citrus × tangerina) of mandarin orange varieties, with some pomelo contribution.

== Etymology ==
The word "tangerine" was originally an adjective meaning "of Tangier", a Moroccan seaport on the Strait of Gibraltar. The name was first used for fruit shipped from Tangier, described as a mandarin variety. The OED cites this usage from Addison's The Tatler in 1710 with similar uses from the 1800s. The fruit was once known scientifically as "Citrus nobilis var. tangeriana"; it grew in the region of Tangiers. This usage appeared in the 1800s.

== Taxonomy ==
Many citrus fruits are hybrids. The tangerine is either a variety of mandarin, or a hybrid of mandarin and pomelo.

Under the Tanaka classification system, Citrus tangerina is considered a separate species. Under the Swingle system, tangerines are considered a group of mandarin (C. reticulata) varieties. Some differ only in disease resistance. The term is also currently applied to any reddish-orange mandarin (and, in some jurisdictions, mandarin-like hybrids, including some tangors).

== Description ==
Tangerines are smaller and less rounded than oranges. They taste less sour, as well as sweeter and stronger, than oranges do. A ripe tangerine is firm to slightly soft, and pebbly-skinned with no deep grooves, as well as orange in color. The peel is thin, with little bitter white mesocarp.

The peak tangerine season lasts from autumn to spring. Tangerines are most commonly peeled and eaten by hand. The fresh fruit is also used in salads, desserts and main dishes. Fresh tangerine juice and frozen juice concentrate are commonly available in the United States.

The peel is used fresh or dried as a spice or zest for baking and drinks: the Chinese spice Chenpi is made from mandarin zest.

== Production ==
Tangerine production – 2021 (millions of tonnes)
China	25.0
Spain	2.0
Turkey	1.8
Morocco	1.2
Brazil	1.08
United States	1.05
Egypt	1.0
World	42.0

In 2021, world production of tangerines (including mandarins and clementines) was 42 million tonnes (46 million short tons), led by China with 60% of the total (table).

Tangerine yield

Production of tangerines

== Varieties ==
Tangerines were first grown and cultivated as a distinct crop in the Americas by a Major Atway in Palatka, Florida. Atway was said to have imported them from Morocco (more specifically its third-largest city, the port of Tangier), which was the origin of the name. Major Atway sold his groves to N. H. Moragne in 1843, giving the Moragne tangerine the other part of its name.

The Moragne tangerine produced a seedling which became one of the oldest and most popular American varieties, the Dancy tangerine (zipper-skin tangerine, kid-glove orange). Genetic analysis has shown the parents of the Dancy to have been two mandarin orange hybrids each with a small pomelo contribution, a Ponkan mandarin orange and a second unidentified mandarin. The Dancy is no longer widely commercially grown; it is too delicate to handle and ship well, it is susceptible to Alternaria fungus, and it bears more heavily in alternate years. Dancys are still grown for personal consumption, and many hybrids of the Dancy are grown commercially.

Until the 1970s, the Dancy was the most widely grown tangerine in the United States; the popularity of the fruit led to the term "tangerine" being broadly applied as a marketing name. Florida classifies tangerine-like hybrid fruits as tangerines for the purposes of sale and regulation; this classification is widely used but regarded as technically inaccurate in the industry. Among the most important tangerine hybrids of Florida are murcotts (a late-fruiting type of tangor marketed as "honey tangerine") and Sunbursts (an early-fruiting complex tangerine-orange-grapefruit hybrid). The fallglo, also a three-way hybrid (5/8 tangerine, 1/4 orange and 1/8 grapefruit), is also grown.

== Nutrition ==
Tangerines, raw
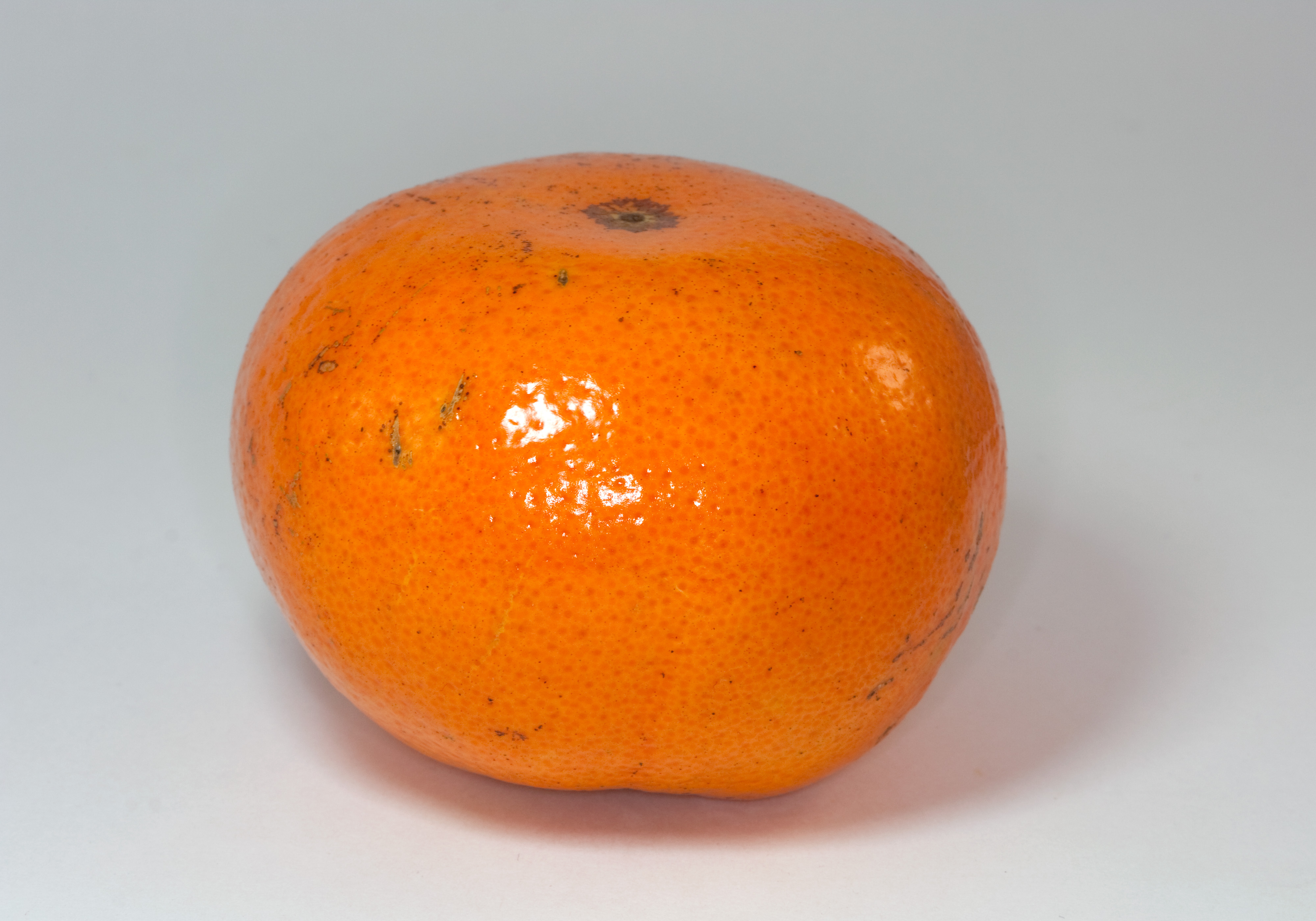
- A murcott, likely a tangerine hybrid

Nutritional value per 100 g (3.5 oz)
- Energy: 223 kJ (53 kcal)
- Carbohydrates: 13.34 g
- Sugars: 10.58 g
- Dietary fiber: 1.8 g
- Fat: 0.31 g
- Protein: 0.81 g
Vitamins and minerals
Vitamins	Quantity %DV^{†}
Vitamin A equiv. beta-Carotene	4% 34 μg 1% 155 μg
Thiamine (B1)	5% 0.058 mg
Riboflavin (B2)	3% 0.036 mg
Niacin (B3)	2% 0.376 mg
Pantothenic acid (B5)	4% 0.216 mg
Vitamin B6	5% 0.078 mg
Folate (B9)	4% 16 μg
Choline	2% 10.2 mg
Vitamin C	30% 26.7 mg
Vitamin E	1% 0.2 mg
Minerals	Quantity %DV^{†}
Calcium	3% 37 mg
Iron	1% 0.15 mg
Magnesium	3% 12 mg
Manganese	2% 0.039 mg
Phosphorus	2% 20 mg
Potassium	6% 166 mg
Sodium	0% 2 mg
Zinc	1% 0.07 mg
- Other constituents: Quantity
- Water: 85.2 g
- Link to USDA Database entry
- ^{†}Percentages estimated using US recommendations for adults, except for potassium, which is estimated based on expert recommendation from the National Academies.

Tangerines contain 85% water, 13% carbohydrates, and negligible amounts of fat and protein (table). Among micronutrients, only vitamin C is in significant content (30% of the Daily Value) in a 100-gram (3.5 oz) reference serving, with all other micronutrients in low amounts.

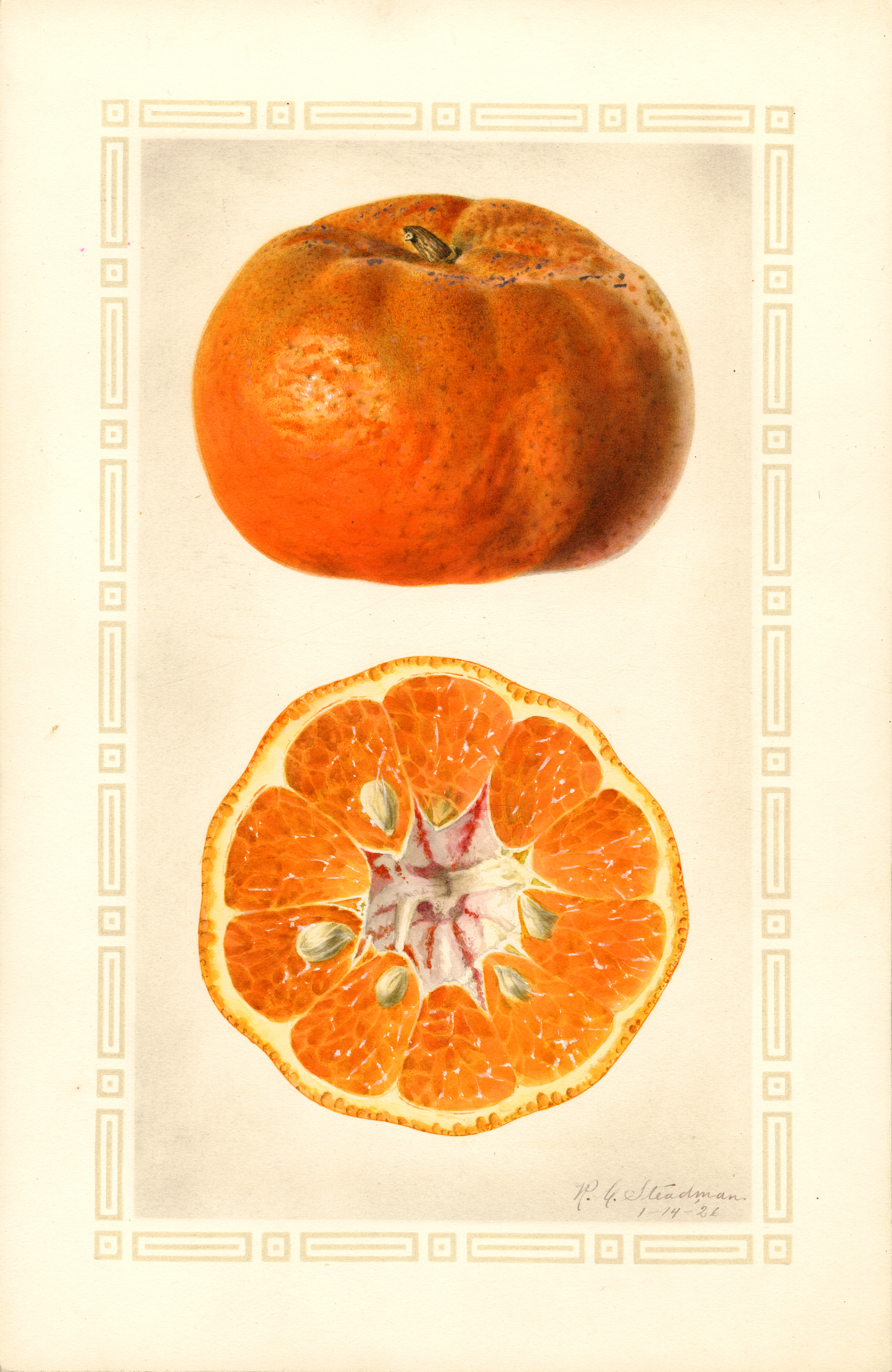
A botanical illustration of a Manurco tangerine, painted by Royal Charles Steadman in January, 1926

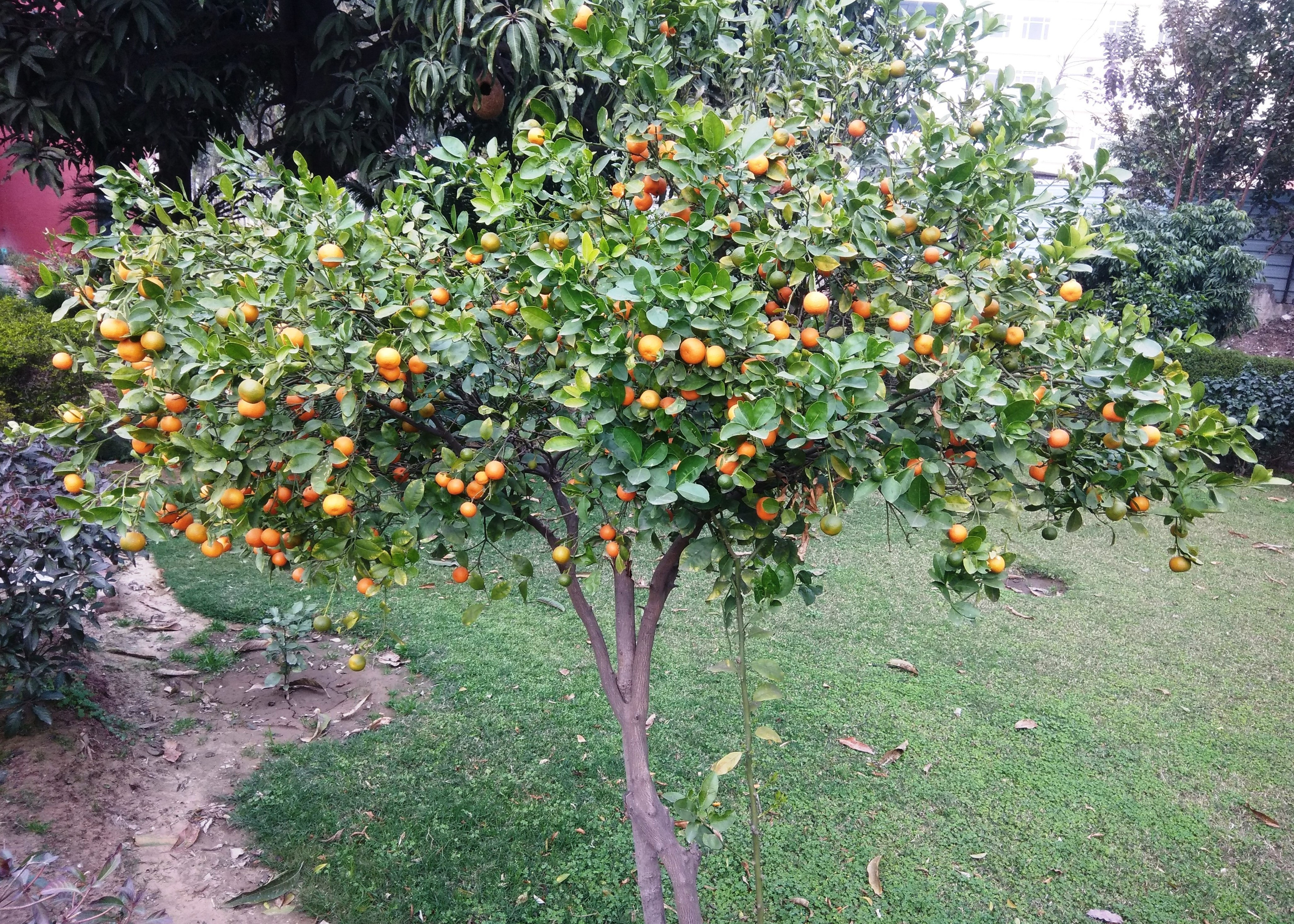
Tangerine tree
