= Clementine =

Hybrid citrus fruit

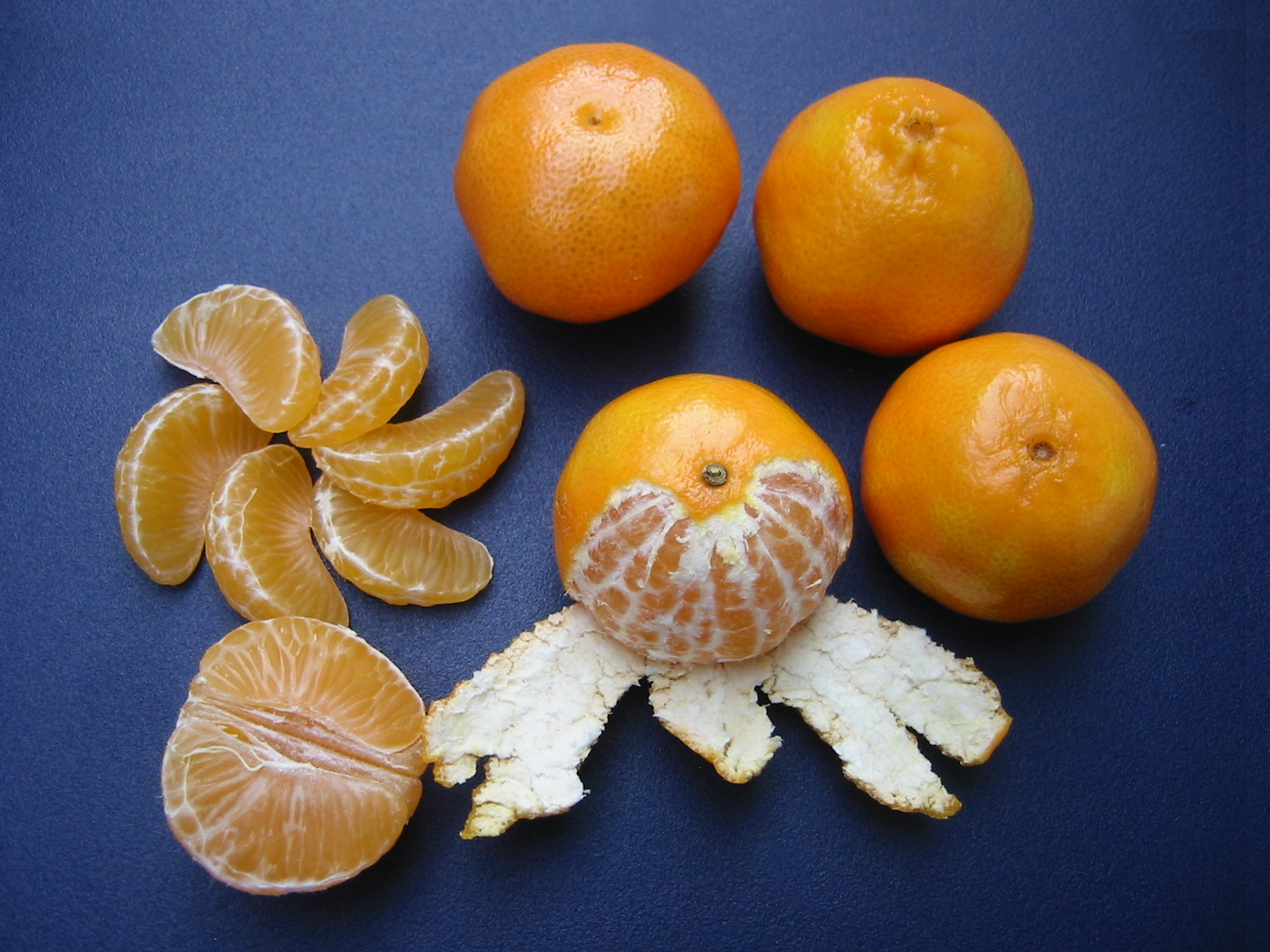
- Five clementines: whole, peeled, halved and sectioned
- Species: Citrus × clementina
- Hybrid parentage: Citrus × deliciosa × sweet orange
- Origin: French Algeria

A clementine (Citrus × clementina) is a tangor, a citrus fruit hybrid between a willowleaf mandarin orange (C. × deliciosa) and a sweet orange (C. × sinensis), named in honor of Clément Rodier, a French missionary who first discovered and propagated the cultivar in Algeria. The exterior is a deep orange colour with a smooth, glossy appearance. Clementines can be separated into 7 to 14 segments. Similar to tangerines, they tend to be easy to peel. They are typically juicy and sweet, with less acid than oranges. Their oils, like other citrus fruits, contain mostly limonene as well as myrcene, linalool, α-pinene and many complex aromatics.

They are sometimes sold under the name easy-peelers.

== History ==
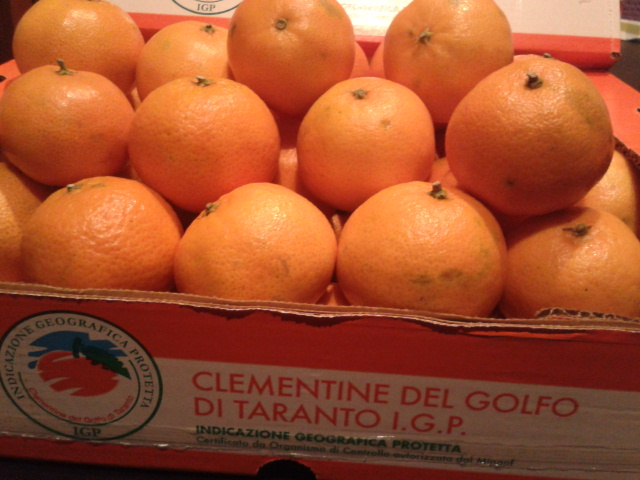
Italian cultivar, Clementine del golfo di Taranto

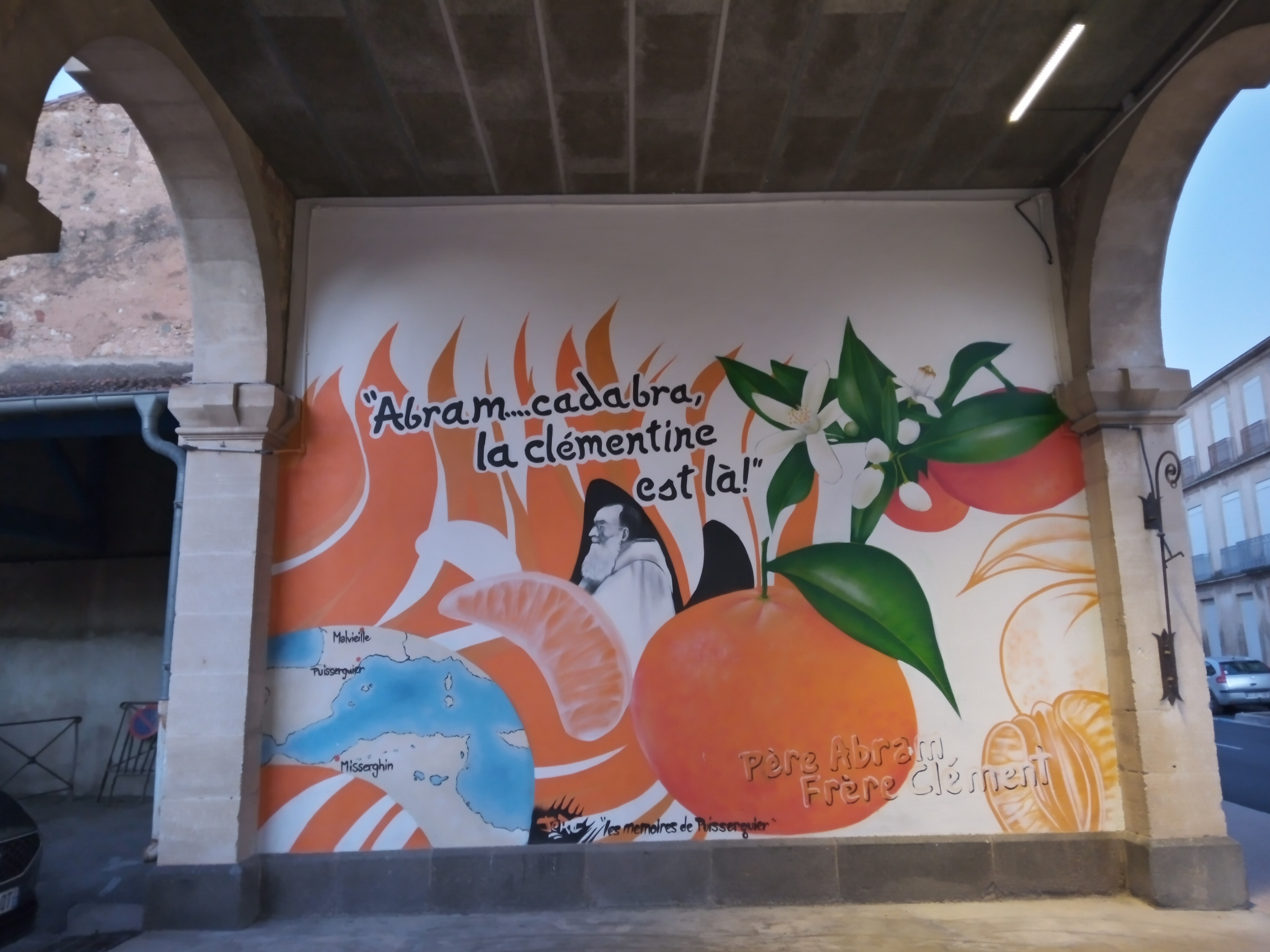
Clementine Mural in Puisserguier France, celebrating Father Abram, founder of the Misserghin orphanage where the 1st citrus clementina was selected

The clementine is a spontaneous citrus hybrid that arose in the late 19th century in Misserghin, Algeria, in the garden of the orphanage of the French missionary brother Clément Rodier, for whom it would be formally named in 1902. Some sources have attributed an earlier origin for the hybrid, pointing to similar fruit native to the provinces of Guangxi and Guangdong in present-day China, but these are likely distinct mandarin hybrids, and genomic analysis of the clementine has shown it to have arisen from a cross between a sweet orange (Citrus × sinensis) and the Mediterranean willowleaf mandarin (Citrus × deliciosa).

There are three types of clementines: seedless clementines, clementines (maximum of 10 seeds), and Monreal (more than 10 seeds). Clementines resemble other citrus varieties, such as the satsuma and tangerines.

== Cultivation ==
Clementines differ from other citrus in having lower heat requirements, which means the tolerance to fruit maturity and sensitivity to unfavorable conditions during the flowering and fruit-setting period is higher. However, in regions of high total heat, the Clementine bears fruit early.

It was introduced into Californian commercial agriculture in 1914, though it was grown at the Citrus Research Center (now part of the University of California, Riverside) as early as 1909. Clementines lose their desirable seedless characteristic when they are cross-pollinated with other fruit. In 2006, to prevent this, growers—such as Paramount Citrus in California—threatened to sue local beekeepers to keep bees away from their crops.

== Types ==
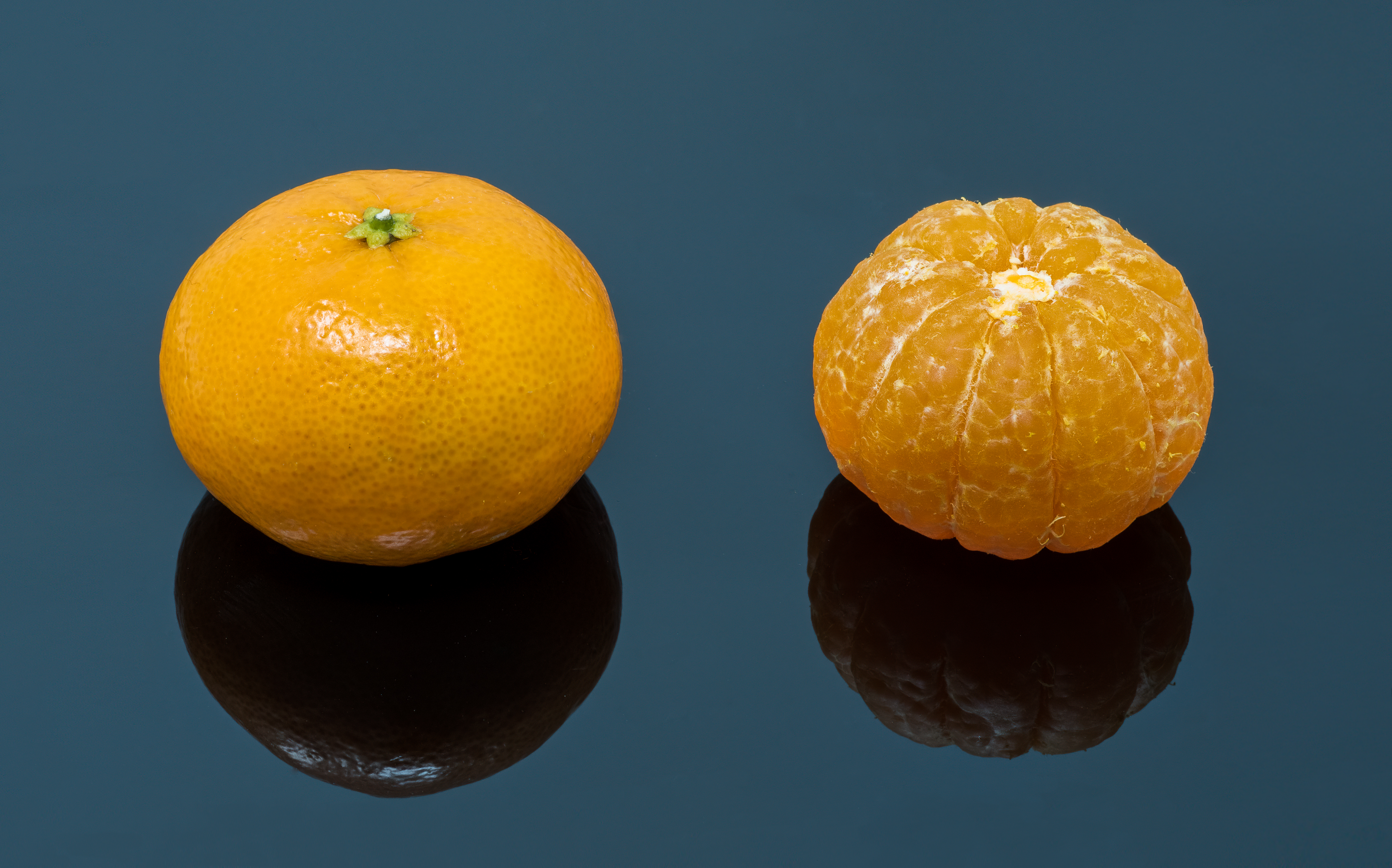
Seedless clementine, unpeeled and peeled

- Seedless – exists in North Africa. Seedless versions of the clementine are known as the common type (seedless or practically seedless). Common Clementines are very similar to the Monreal type; the two types are virtually identical in terms of tree specifics. The seedless Clementine tree is self-incompatible; which is why the fruit has so few or no seeds. In order to be pollinated, it needs to be cross-pollinated.
- Monreal – exists in North Africa. The Monreal clementine can self-pollinate and has seeds. Monreal clementines are on average larger than the seedless variety, have a more abundant bloom and are sweeter.
- Sweetclems — are typically grown in Spain and northern Africa. Unlike other Clementine varieties, they usually have 10 slices. They are specialised to be easy to peel. They have a sweet taste, as suggested by their name, but it is not overbearing and quite mild. The sweetclem has several other brand names, and can also be referred to as an easy-peeler, a clemengold, and a clemcott, amongst others.

== Varieties ==
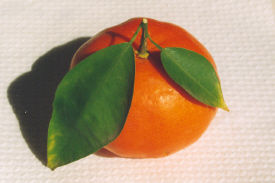
Spanish clementine, possibly the Fina cultivar

- Algerian, the original Rodier cultivar.
- Fina, a Spanish cultivar originally grown on a bitter orange rootstock that gave it superb flavor, but due to disease vulnerability is now grown on a broader range of rootstocks, affecting the flavor profile.
- Clemenules or Nules – A popular, seedless, easy to peel clementine with a very pleasing sweet flavor. A mutation of the Fina variety, Nules is the most widely planted clementine in Spain, where it matures from mid-November to mid to late-January. Also widely planted in California, where it matures from October to December. It produces seedless fruit that is larger than the Fina, but less sweet.
- Clementine del Golfo di Taranto, a (practically) seedless Italian cultivar given protected geographical indication (PGI) status by the European Union, produced around the Gulf of Taranto. They have a sweet flavour and an intense aroma.
- Clementine di Calabria, another Italian PGI variety, grown in the Calabria region.

Production of clementines, tangerines, mandarins and satsumas* in 2016 (millions of tonnes)
China	17.2
Spain	7.9
Turkey	1.3
Morocco	1.1
Egypt	1.0
Brazil	1.0
World	37.8
*FAOSTAT of the United Nations, which groups these fruits together in their data

== Nutrition and composition ==
Clementines
Nutritional value per 100 g (3.5 oz)
- Energy: 198 kJ (47 kcal)
- Carbohydrates: 12.02 g
- Sugars sucrose glucose fructose: 9.18 g 5.96 g 1.59 g 1.64 g
- Dietary fiber: 1.7 g
- Fat: 0.15 g
- Protein: 0.85 g
Vitamins and minerals
Vitamins	Quantity %DV^{†}
Thiamine (B1)	7% 0.086 mg
Riboflavin (B2)	2% 0.030 mg
Niacin (B3)	4% 0.636 mg
Pantothenic acid (B5)	3% 0.151 mg
Vitamin B6	4% 0.075 mg
Folate (B9)	6% 24 μg
Choline	3% 14 mg
Vitamin C	54% 48.8 mg
Vitamin E	1% 0.20 mg
Minerals	Quantity %DV^{†}
Calcium	2% 30 mg
Copper	5% 0.043 mg
Iron	1% 0.14 mg
Magnesium	2% 10 mg
Manganese	1% 0.023 mg
Phosphorus	2% 21 mg
Potassium	6% 177 mg
Selenium	0% 0.1 μg
Sodium	0% 1 mg
Zinc	1% 0.06 mg
- Other constituents: Quantity
- Water: 86.58 g
- Entry in USDA Database
- ^{†}Percentages estimated using US recommendations for adults, except for potassium, which is estimated based on expert recommendation from the National Academies.

Evaluation table
Parameters (%)	Values
Moisture	11.41 ± 1.24
Ash	5.44 ± 0.02
Lipid (Fat)	3.19 ± 0.16
Carbohydrate	16.04 ± 21.21
Protein	8.65 ± 0.04
Fiber	20.66 ± 1.07
Caloric value	127.25 ± 85.26

== Potential drug interactions ==
A 2017 study indicated that clementine phytochemicals may interact with drugs in a manner similar to those of grapefruit. A follow-up study in 2019, however, has called these results into question.

== See also ==
- Clementine cake
- List of foods named after people
- Apulian Cuisine
- List of Italian products with protected designation of origin
