= Kiyomi =

Citrus fruit and plant

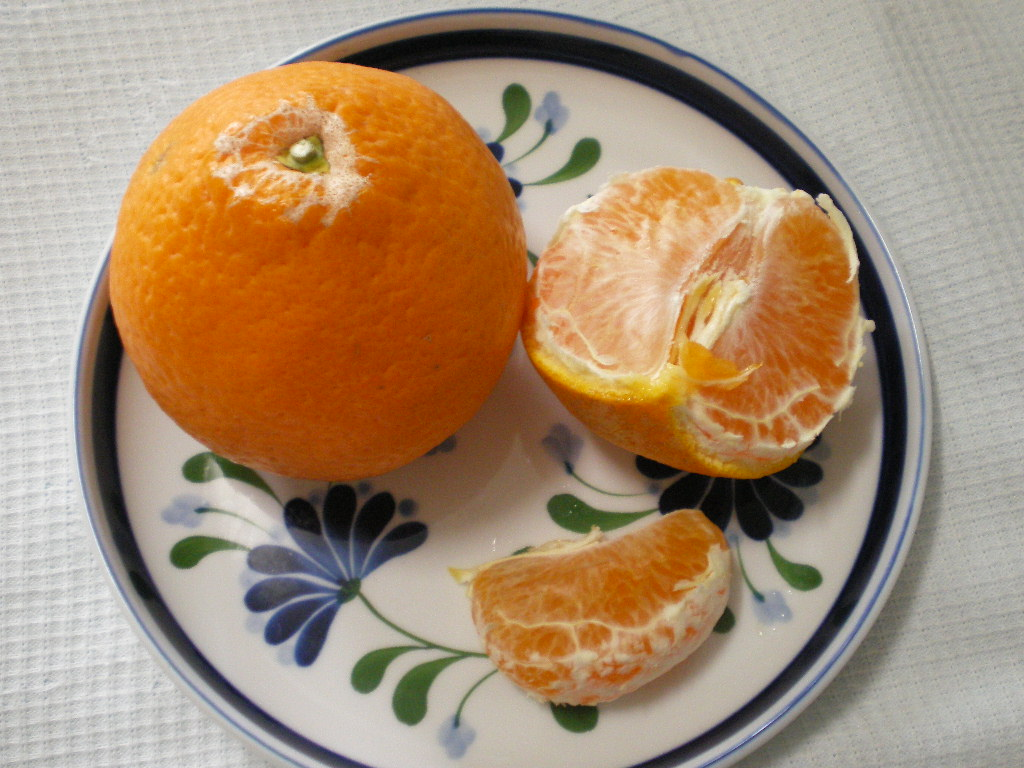
- Kiyomi
- Genus: Citrus
- Hybrid parentage: C. unshiu × sinensis
- Origin: Japan

Kiyomi (清見, kiyomi) (Citrus unshiu × sinensis) is a Japanese, sweet citrus fruit that is a hybrid of a Miyagawa Wase mikan and an orange. The new breed was the first tangor created in Japan in 1949. It was named Kiyomi after the temple Seiken-ji (清見寺) and the lagoon Kiyomi-gata (清見潟) near its experiment station in Shizuoka city and registered as "Tangor Nōrin No.1" in 1979.

Kiyomi are sweet. Sugar content is normally 11–12 °Bx and reaches even 13 °Bx if conditions are met. Citric acid content is around 1%. It has no seeds. The time of ripening is mid to late March. The flavor is similar to that of a mikan, while the aroma is similar to that of an orange.

Kiyomi is a monogerm, so it is often used as a parent citrus to create new hybrids such as dekopon.
