= List of citrus fruits =

This is a list of citrus fruits:

== Common group names ==
- Japanese citrus
- Lime
  - Australian lime
- Lumia
- Orange
- Papeda
- Sweet lemon

== Citrus species ==
Overview of citrus species
| Common name(s) | Image | Taxonomic name/constituents | Notes |
|---|---|---|---|
| Bergamot orange | | Citrus bergamia | A fragrant citrus fruit the size of an orange, with a yellow or green colour similar to a lime, depending on ripeness. Genetic research into the ancestral origins of extant citrus cultivars found bergamot orange to be a probable hybrid of lemon and bitter orange. |
| Citron | | Citrus medica | A citrus fruit with a lot of variations. |
| Clymenia | | | |
| Desert lime | | Citrus glauca | Found in lowland subtropical rainforest and dry rainforest areas of Queensland and New South Wales, Australia. Early settlers consumed the fruit and retained the trees when clearing for agriculture. Commercial uses include boutique marmalade and restaurant dishes, and is exported for such. |
| Finger lime | | Citrus australasica | The finger lime has been recently popularised as a gourmet bushfood. Finger lime is thought to have the widest range of colour variation within any Citrus species. |
| Ginger lime Adajamir | | Citrus assamensis | Native to Assam and Bangladesh. It is locally cultivated for its fruit, which give a very sour juice with an aroma reminiscent of ginger or eucalyptus. |
| Hyuganatsu; Konatsu; Tosakonatsu; New Summer Orange | | Citrus tamurana | Hyuganatsu (Citrus tamurana, Japanese: 日向夏) is a citrus fruit and plant grown in Japan. The name comes from Hyūga, the ancient name of Miyazaki Prefecture in Kyushu, where the citrus is said to have originated, while "natsu" (夏) means summer. Hyūganatsu grown outside Kyushu are sometimes shipped under different names such as Konatsu (小夏), Tosakonatsu (土佐小夏), or New Summer Orange (ニューサマーオレンジ). |
| Kabosu | | Citrus sphaerocarpa | A citrus fruit of an evergreen broad-leaf tree in the family Rutaceae. It is popular in Japan, where its juice is used to improve the taste of many dishes, especially cooked fish, sashimi, and hot pot dishes. |
| Kawachi Bankan | | Citrus kawachiensis | Two varieties of Kawachi Bankan have been identified: one, a hybrid between the ujukitsu (seed parent, Citrus ujukitsu) and an unidentified species (pollen parent), and the other, a hybrid between the yuge-hyoukan (seed parent, Citrus yuge-hyokan) and an unidentified species (pollen parent). |
| Koji orange | | Citrus leiocarpa | Also called smooth-fruited orange in English, is a Citrus species native to Japan. |
| Kumquat | | Citrus japonica | Historically also sometimes thought to be in genus Fortunella. |
| Lemon | | Citrus limon | A species of small evergreen trees native to Asia, primarily Northeast India (Assam), Northern Myanmar or China. |
| Mandarin orange Mandarin; Mandarine | | Citrus reticulata | |
| Mangshanyegan | | Citrus mangshanensis | |
| Myrtle-leaved orange tree Chinotto | | Citrus myrtifolia | Citrus myrtifolia, the myrtle-leaved orange tree, is a species of Citrus with foliage similar to that of the common myrtle. It is a compact tree with small leaves and no thorns which grows to a height of 3 m (10 ft) and can be found in Malta, Libya, the south of France, and Italy (primarily in Liguria, typically Savona, and also in Tuscany, Sicily, and Calabria). It is an essential flavoring agent of most Italian amari, of the popular Campari apéritif, and of several brands of carbonated soft drinks that are generically called "chinotto". |
| Pomelo; Pummelo; Pommelo; Shaddock | | Citrus maxima | Sometimes called Citrus grandis. |
| Round lime Australian lime Australian round lime | | Citrus australis | Citrus australis, the Dooja, round lime, or Australian round lime, is a large Australian lime shrub or small tree producing an edible fruit. It grows in forest margins in the Beenleigh area and northwards, in Queensland, Australia. |
| Satsuma; Cold hardy mandarin Satsuma mandarin Satsuma orange Christmas orange Tangerine | | Citrus unshiu | Citrus unshiu is a semi-seedless and easy-peeling citrus species. |
| Sudachi | | Citrus sudachi | |
| Tangerine | | Citrus tangerina | |

== Citron ==
Overview of citrons
| Common name(s) | Image | Taxonomic name/constituents | Notes |
|---|---|---|---|
| Citron | | Citrus medica | |
| Balady citron | | Citrus medica | The balady citron is a variety of citron, or etrog, grown in Israel, mostly for Jewish ritual purposes. |
| Buddha's hand Bushukan; Fingered citron | | Citrus medica var. sarcodactylis | Buddha's hand can be found in Northeast India as well as China. |
| Corsican citron | | Citrus medica | |
| Diamante citron | | Citrus medica var. diamante | |
| Etrog | | Citrus medica | |
| Greek citron | | Citrus medica | |
| Moroccan citron | | Citrus medica | |
| Pompia | | Citrus medica tuberosa | |

== Clymenia ==
Overview of clymenias
| Common name(s) | Image | Taxonomic name/constituents | Notes |
|---|---|---|---|
| Clymenia | | Clymenia sp. | Clymenia is a small genus of flowering plants in the family Rutaceae with two species. The genus is often included in Citrus. Clymenia fruits are a small hesperidium, a citrus fruit. Sweet and lemony in flavor, the tangerine-sized fruits are highly segmented, with yellow pulp, and a leathery rind. They contain a large number of polyembryonic seeds. |
| Clymenia platypoda B.C.Stone | | Clymenia platypoda | |
| Clymenia polyandra (Tanaka) Swingle | | Clymenia polyandra | |

== Lime ==
Overview of limes
| Common name(s) | Image | Taxonomic name/constituents | Notes |
|---|---|---|---|
| Lime | | Citrus × aurantiifolia | |
| Desert lime | | Citrus glauca | Found in lowland subtropical rainforest and dry rainforest areas of Queensland and New South Wales, Australia. Early settlers consumed the fruit and retained the trees when clearing for agriculture. Commercial uses include boutique marmalade and restaurant dishes, and is exported for such. |
| Finger lime | | Citrus australasica | The finger lime has been recently popularised as a gourmet bushfood. Finger lime is thought to have the widest range of colour variation within any Citrus species. |
| Ginger lime Adajamir | | Citrus assamensis | Citrus assamensis, the adajamir or ginger lime, is a species of flowering plant in the family Rutaceae, native to Assam and Bangladesh. It is locally cultivated for its fruit, which give a very sour juice with an aroma reminiscent of ginger or eucalyptus. |
| Key lime | | Citrus × aurantiifolia | |
| Persian lime Tahiti lime Bearss lime | | Citrus × latifolia | This lime is commonly dried to make a spice. |

== Mandarin ==
Overview of mandarins
| Common name(s) | Image | Taxonomic name/constituents | Notes |
|---|---|---|---|
| Mandarin orange Mandarin Mandarine | | Citrus reticulata | |
| Kanpei | | Citrus reticulata 'Kanpei' | Kanpei, also known as Ehime queen splash, is a Citrus cultivar that originated in Japan. Kanpei was created by crossing the dekopon and nishinokaori varieties in 1991, although it was not officially introduced until August 2007. |

== Orange ==
Overview of oranges
| Common name(s) | Image | Taxonomic name/constituents | Notes |
|---|---|---|---|
| Orange | | Citrus × sinensis | |
| Bergamot orange | | Citrus bergamia | Citrus bergamia, the bergamot orange, is a fragrant citrus fruit the size of an orange, with a yellow or green colour similar to a lime, depending on ripeness. Genetic research into the ancestral origins of extant citrus cultivars found bergamot orange to be a probable hybrid of lemon and bitter orange. |
| Blood orange | | Citrus × sinensis | The blood orange, or raspberry orange, is a variety of sweet orange (Citrus × sinensis) with crimson, near blood-colored flesh. It is believed to be a naturally occurring mutation of the sweet orange. |
| Bitter orange Seville orange Sour orange Bigarade orange Marmalade orange | | Citrus × aurantium var amara | |
| Koji orange | | Citrus leiocarpa | |
| Navel orange | | Citrus × sinensis | |
| Sweet orange Orange | | Citrus × sinensis | |

== Papeda ==
Overview of papedas
| Common name(s) | Image | Taxonomic name/constituents | Notes |
|---|---|---|---|
| Papeda | | | Papedas are a group of less palatable, slow-growing, hardy citrus native to Asia, formerly placed in the subgenus Papeda of the genus Citrus. The papeda group includes some of the most tropical, and also some of the most frost-tolerant citrus plants. They are cultivated far less often than other citrus, though they will all hybridize with other citrus. This group contains about 15 species. |
| Ichang papeda | | Citrus cavaleriei | |
| Kaffir lime | | Citrus hystrix | |

== Other cultivars and hybrids ==
Overview of various citrus cultivars and hybrids
| Common name(s) | Image | Taxonomic name/constituents | Notes |
|---|---|---|---|
| Amanatsu; Natsumikan | | Citrus natsudaidai | A group of cultivars of Citrus natsudaidai, which were discovered in 1740 in the Yamaguchi prefecture of Japan. Yellowish-orange in colour, about the size of grapefruit and oblate in shape. The fruit contains 12 segments and about 30 seeds. The natsumikan tree is believed to be genetically derived from the pomelo (Citrus maxima). |
| Calamondin; Calamansi | | × Citrofortunella mitis | Calamansi, also known as calamondin, Philippine lime, or Philippine lemon, is an economically important citrus hybrid predominantly cultivated in the Philippines. It is native to the Philippines, Borneo, Sumatra, and Sulawesi in Indonesia in Southeast Asia, Malaysia as well as southern China and Taiwan in East Asia. |
| Cam sành | | Citrus reticulata × maxima | |
| Citrange | | Citrus sinensis × Poncirus trifoliata | |
| Citrumelo | | × Citroncirus ssp. | Citrumelo is also called Swingle citrumelo trifoliate hybrid, because it is cold hardy and is a hybrid between a 'Duncan' grapefruit and a trifoliate orange, developed by Walter Tennyson Swingle. |
| Clementine | | Citrus × clementina | A clementine is a tangor, a citrus fruit hybrid between a willowleaf mandarin orange and a sweet orange, named in honour of Clément Rodier, a French missionary who first discovered and propagated the cultivar in Algeria. The exterior is a deep orange colour with a smooth, glossy appearance. |
| First Lady; Anadomikan | | Citrus × iyo | |
| Florentine citron | | Citrus × limonimedica | |
| Grapefruit | | Citrus × paradisi | a cross between a pomelo and sweet orange. |
| Haruka | | Citrus tamurana × natsudaidai | |
| Hassaku | | Citrus × hassaku | |
| Jabara | | Citrus × jabara | |
| Kobayashi mikan | | Citrus natsudaidai × unshiu | |
| Lemonade fruit | | Citrus limon x reticulata | A sweet lemon variety originating in New Zealand |
| Lumia | | Citrus × lumia | Lumias represent several distinct citrus hybrids. Usually lumias are referred to as a citron hybrid, because of their size, thick peel and dryness of pulp. |
| Meyer lemon | | Citrus × meyeri | a cross between an orange and a lemon. This species tastes like lemon and has more juice. |
| Orangelo | | C.paradisi × C. sinensis | |
| Oroblanco; Sweetie | | C. maxima × C. paradisi | A sweet seedless citrus hybrid fruit (grapefruit × pomelo). Oroblanco was developed as a cross between a diploid acidless pomelo and a seedy white tetraploid grapefruit, resulting in a triploid seedless fruit that is less acidic and less bitter than the grapefruit. |
| Ponkan | | Citrus poonensis | Ponkan (Citrus poonensis; "Chinese Honey Orange") is a high-yield sweet Citrus cultivar with large fruits in the size of an orange. It is a citrus hybrid (mandarin × pomelo), though it was once thought to be a pure mandarin. |
| Taiwan tangerine Flat lemon Hirami lemon Thin-skinned flat lemon | | Citrus × depressa | |
| Tangelo; Honeybell | | C. reticulata × C. maxima or ×C. paradisi | |
| Tangor | | C. reticulata × C. sinensis | Numerous varieties, including the clementine, murcott, ortanique, and setoka |
| Jamaican tangelo | | C. reticulata × C. paradisi | Also known as ugli fruit |
| Kinkoji unshiu | | C. obovoidea × C. unshiu | |
| Kinnow | | C. nobilis × C. deliciosa | |
| Kiyomi | | Citrus unshiu × Citrus sinensis | Kiyomi (清見, kiyomi) (Citrus unshiu × sinensis) is a Japanese citrus fruit that is a hybrid of a Miyagawa Wase mikan and an orange. |
| Ponderosa lemon | | Citrus maxima × C. medica | |
| Rangpur; Lemandarin | | Citrus × limonia | |
| Shangjuan; Ichang lemon | | Citrus cavaleriei × C. maxima | |
| Shonan Gold | | Citrus flaviculpus hort. ex Tanaka (Ōgonkan) × Citrus unshiu | |
| Sweet limetta Mediterranean sweet lemon Sweet lemon Sweet lime | | Citrus limetta (C. medica × C. × aurantium ) | Citrus limetta, alternatively considered to be a cultivar of Citrus limon, C. limon 'Limetta', is a species of citrus, commonly known as mousami, musami, sweet lime, sweet lemon, and sweet limetta, it is a member of the sweet lemons. It is small and round like a common lime in shape. It is a cross between the citron (Citrus medica) and a bitter orange (Citrus × aurantium). |
| Tsunonozomi | | Kiyomi × Encore | |
| Volkamer lemon | | Citrus volkameriana (C. medica × C. reticulata ) | Like the Rangpur lime and rough lemon, it is a hybrid of a mandarin orange (C. reticulata) and a citron (C. medica), with the citron being the pollen parent and the mandarin being the seed parent. The fruit is moderately large (around the size of an orange), seedy, round and slightly elongated, and yellow-orange in color. |
| Yukou | | Citrus yuko | The yūkō (ゆうこう), also written yukou, is a Japanese citrus found in the Nagasaki Prefecture and Saga Prefecture of Japan. Genetic analysis has shown it to be a cross between the kishumikan and koji, a part-tachibana orange hybrid native to Japan. |
| Yuzu | | Citrus cavaleriei × C. reticulata | A unique Chinese citrus. It is commonly used to make tea and essential oil. |

== See also ==
- List of lemon dishes and drinks
