= Japanese citrus =

Citrus fruit plants associated with Japan

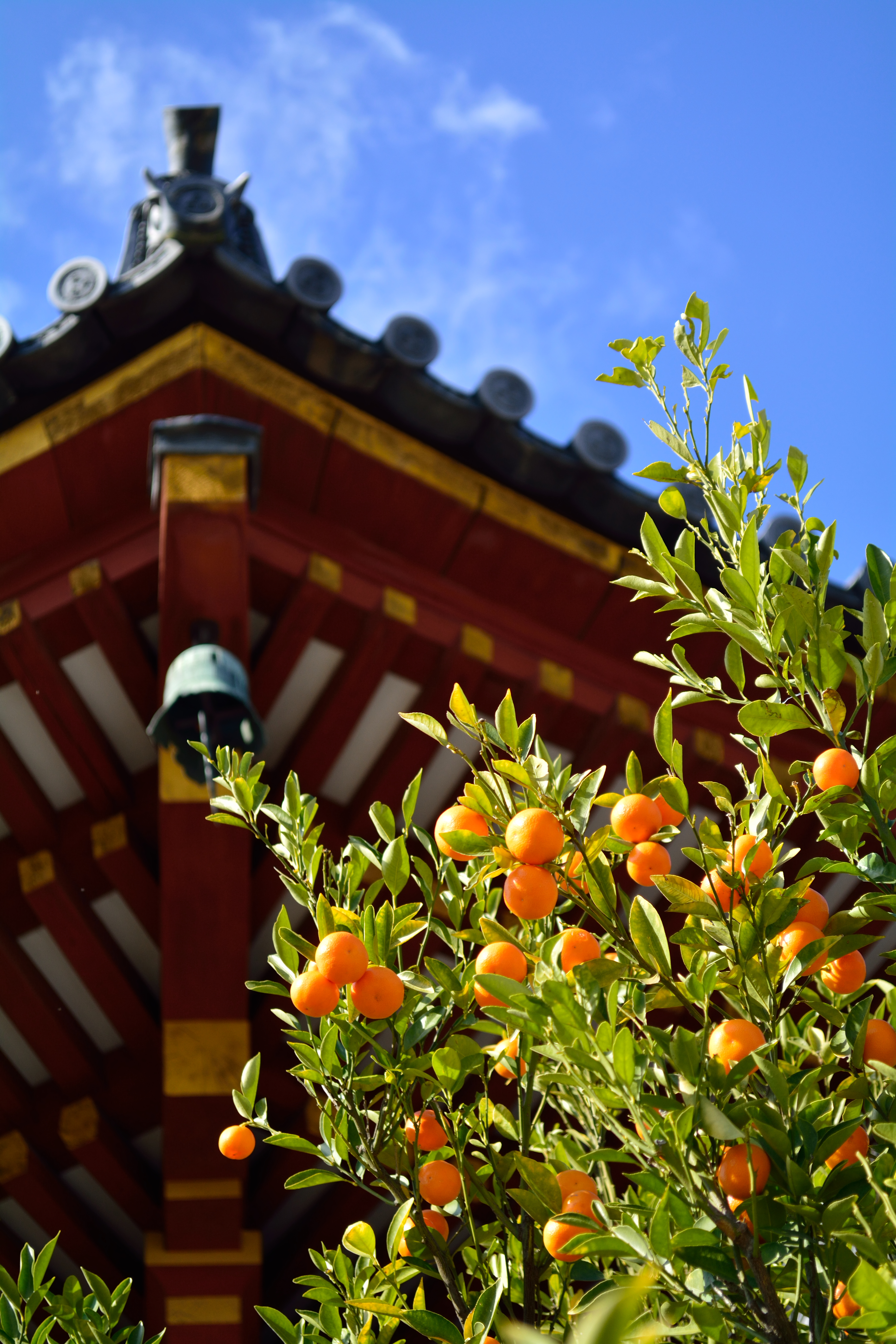
A Tachibana orange tree with fruit at Kofuku-ji, Nara

Japanese citrus fruits were first mentioned in the Kojiki and Nihonshoki, compiled in the 700s, and the Man'yōshū and Kokin Wakashū, poetry anthologies compiled in the 700s and 900s, mention the Tachibana orange as a subject of waka poetry and describe its use as a medicinal, ornamental, and incense plant.

Throughout their history, the Japanese have created and cultivated various varieties of citrus fruits, taking advantage of the mild climate that is ideal for growing citrus. In particular, from the 1600s during the Edo period (1603–1868) to the present, various varieties of citrus fruits have been produced, including Unshū, Natsumikan, Hassaku, Iyokan, and Dekopon. At present, Unshū is the most widely grown in Japan, and various cultivars have been developed.

At present, the largest citrus growing areas are located in the prefectures of Wakayama, Shizuoka, Tokushima, Kochi, Oita, Miyazaki and Ehime.

== History ==
Citrus fruits are believed to have originated in Assam, India and the foothills of the Himalayas, and later spread throughout the world. In October 2023, published genetic research proved that the ancestor of the citrus plants originated in India more than 25 million years ago and evolved into the true citrus species in southern China 8 million years ago, followed by early citrus species such as pomelo and citron that originated in the foothills of the Himalayas. Yuzu, kunembo, and daidai, are believed to have been introduced to Japan from China between the Nara (710–794) and Muromachi periods (1336–1573).

The Kojiki and Nihon Shoki, compiled in the 700s, were the first books in Japan to describe citrus fruits. The Nihon Shoki states that a man named Tajimamori brought back citrus fruits from the Tokoyo no kuni (Land of immortality, ja:常世の国) on the orders of Emperor Suinin, which is thought to refer to the tachibana orange that grows wild in Japan. The Man'yōshū, a collection of poems from the same period, contains many poems about tachibana orange, and because of its strong acidity at the time, it was dried and used for medicinal and ornamental purposes rather than for food. The Kokin Wakashū, compiled in the 900s, mentions that tachibana orange was burned and used as incense to give a nice fragrance to kimonos. In Japan, tachibana orange is a symbol of eternity and is the motif for the Order of Culture.

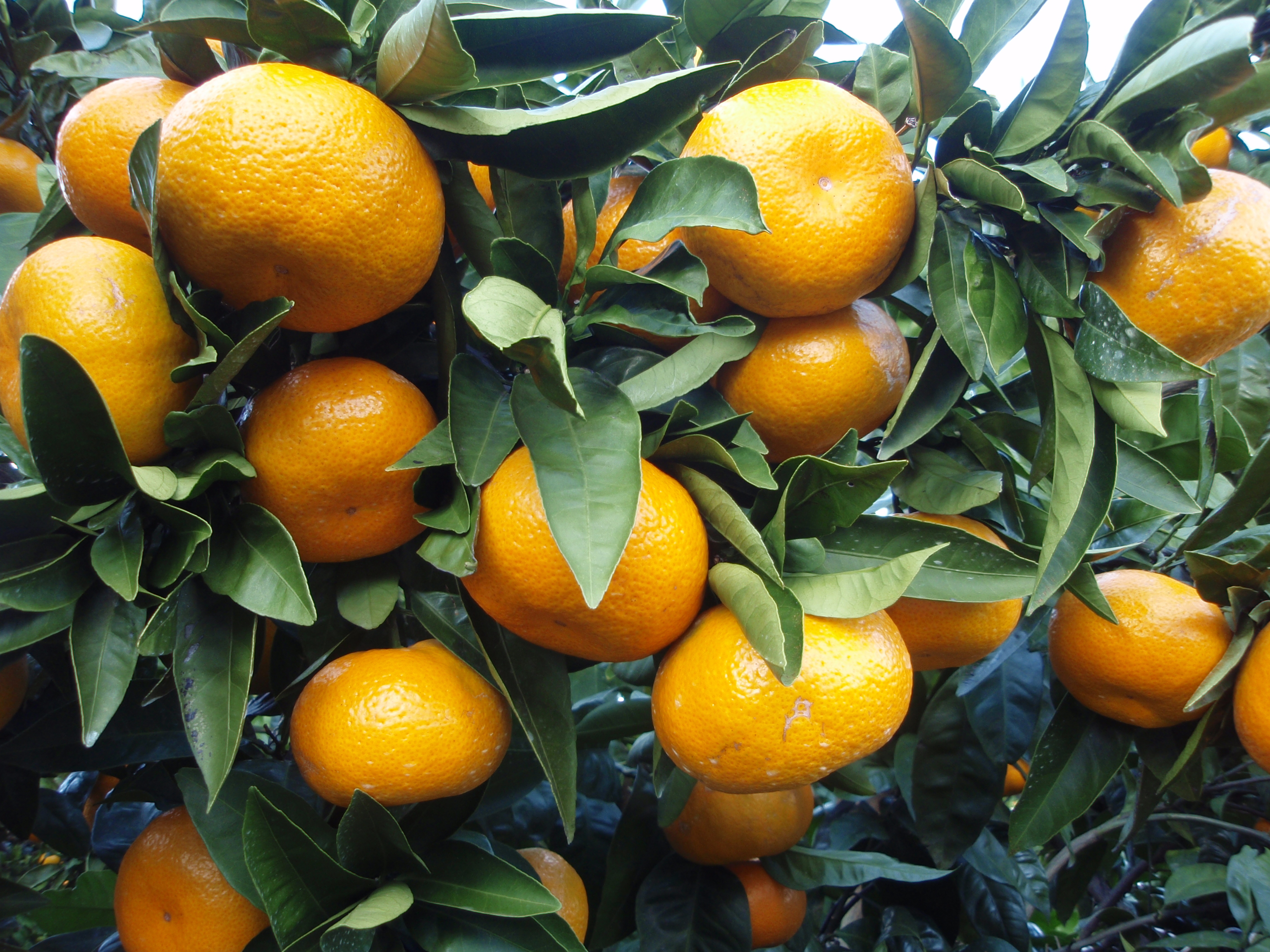
Unshū is the most widely grown citrus fruit in Japan

The most widely grown variety in Japan today is the unshu mikan (Citrus unshiu), also known as the satsuma orange. There are two theories about the origin of the unshu mikan. One is that unshu mikan originated in Japan, while the other is that it originated in China. According to the Japanese origin theory, several species that would serve as the parents of unshu mikan were introduced from China, and in the 1600s, they were born in Nishi-Nakajima, Higo Province (later Nagashima, Kagoshima) in Japan. The Japanese Ministry of Agriculture, Forestry and Fisheries, Ehime Prefecture and Japanese scientists support this theory of Japanese origin. Genetic research has shown that the unshu mikan is a cross between the kishu and kunembo. During the Edo period, unshu mikan were not very popular due to a superstition that eating seedless unshu mikan would make one infertile. It was not until the Meiji era (1868–1912), when modernization began, that the popularity of unshu mikan increased. From the mid-Edo period (1603–1867) to the mid-Meiji era (1868–1912), kishu mikan were the mainstay of cultivation.

From the Edo period (1603–1867) to the present, the Japanese have created numerous varieties of citrus fruits, collectively known as tyūbankan (中晩柑). It is a general term for citrus fruits shipped from January to May, after the shipping period of unshu mikan, which is from October to February. For example, natsumikan (Citrus natsudaidai) was developed around 1700, hassaku in 1860, and iyokan in 1886. Kiyomi, Setoka and Kanpei are also types of tyūbankan. dekopon, created in 1972, is one of the most popular varieties internationally. Dekopon was introduced to South Korea in the 1990s and became popular as Hallabong, was exported to California in 1998, and has been marketed as "Sumo Citrus" since 2011.

Japan's warm summer climate makes it particularly suitable for citrus plants; while they are grown all over the country, the largest citrus growing areas are located in the prefectures of Wakayama, Shizuoka, Tokushima, Kochi, Oita, Miyazaki and Ehime. In Japan, various cultivars have been developed based on the unshu mikan, and three cultivars, namely miyagawa wase, okitsu wase, and aoshima unshu, account for nearly half of the production volume of unshu mikan.

== Japanese taxonomy ==
Japan usually follows the botanical names of the taxonomy from Tyôzaburô Tanaka, often referred to as the "Tanaka system", giving for each cultivar a separate name no matter if it is pure or a hybrid of two or more species or varieties. While elsewhere it is more popular to classify the genus citrus into species, and further into varieties, and then into cultivars or hybrid. Such a system was created by Walter Tennyson Swingle from Florida and is called the "Swingle system". The different approaches of the two systems lead to partially-overlapping or nested 'species', for example, Citrus unshiu and Citrus tangerina (Tanaka) versus Citrus reticulata (Swingle). Likewise, common terms, like "mikan", do not always align with these taxonomic groups.

== Japanese citrus (partial list) ==
Japanese citrus fruits include the following:

Common name(s)	Image	Taxonomic name/constituents	Notes
Amanatsu		Citrus × natsudaidai	Yellowish-orange in colour, about the size of grapefruit and oblate in shape. The fruit contains 12 segments and about 30 seeds.
Banpeiyu (pomelo cultivar)		Citrus maxima	
Bushukan (Buddha's hand)		Citrus medica var. sarcodactylis	
Daidai		Citrus × aurantium	
Dekopon		Citrus unshiu × sinensis × C. poonensis	
Haruka		Citrus tamurana × natsudaidai	
Hassaku		Citrus × hassaku	
Hyuganatsu		Citrus tamurana	
Iyokan		Citrus × iyo	
Jabara		Citrus × jabara	
Kabosu		Citrus sphaerocarpa	
Karatachi (Japanese bitter orange)		Citrus trifoliata (Poncirus trifoliata)	
Kanpei		'Nishinokaori' × Ponkan	Recent DNA analysis revealed that the pollen parent of 'Kanpei' is 'Ponkan', rather than 'Shiranuhi'.
Kawachi Bankan (Mishokan)		Citrus kawachiensis	
Kinkan (Kumquat)		Citrus japonica	
Kinkoji unshiu		Citrus obovoidea × unshiu	
Kishu		Citrus kinokuni	
Kiyomi		Citrus unshiu × sinensis	
Kobayashi mikan		Citrus natsudaidai × unshiu	
Koji orange		Citrus leiocarpa	
Mikan		Citrus unshiu	
Ōgonkan		Citrus flaviculpus	
Ponkan (Tangerine)		Citrus poonensis	
Reikou			
Sakurajima komikan (mandarin orange cultivar),		Citrus kinokuni	An analysis using 206 SNPs has reported that Sakurajima Komikan, Kishu Mikan, and 南丰蜜桔(Nán fēng mì jú) are synonyms.
Sanbokan		Citrus sulcata	
Shonan gold		Citrus flaviculpus × Citrus unshiu	Developed by crossing Ōgonkan with 'Imamura Unshu'.
Shikuwasa (Shiikwaasaa, Shequasar, Hirami lemon)		Citrus × depressa	
Sudachi		Citrus sudachi	
Tachibana		Citrus tachibana or Citrus reticulata var. tachibana	
Tankan		??? × Citrus sinensis	Based on DNA marker analysis, it is presumed to be a progeny of sweet orange and an unidentified cultivar with a sunki-type cytotype.
Tsunonozomi		'Kiyomi' × 'Encore'	
Yukou		Citrus yuko	
Yuzu		Citrus junos	
