= Kobayashi mikan =

Hybrid Species of fruit and plant

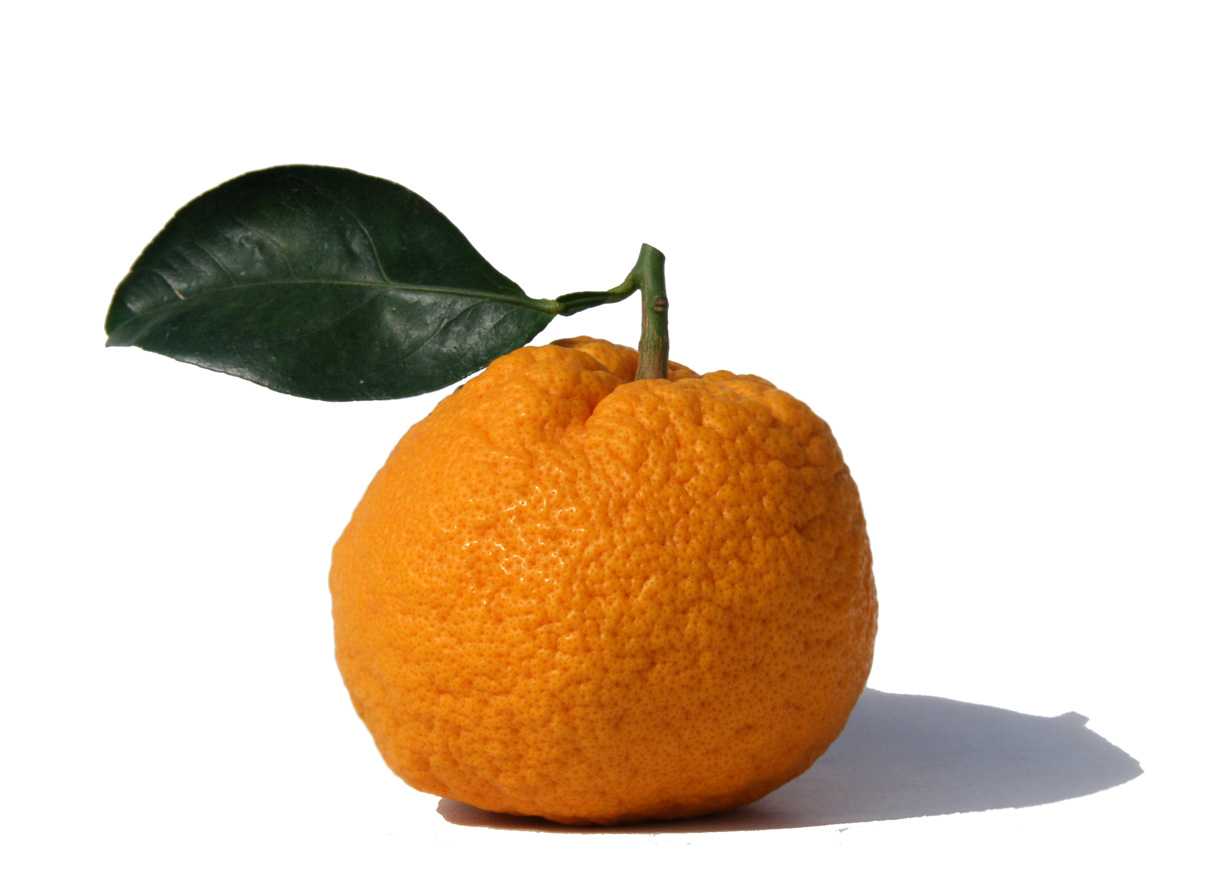
- A Kobayashi mikan fruit
- Genus: Citrus
- Species: Citrus reticulata
- Hybrid parentage: Amanatsu × satsuma
- Cultivar: Kobayashi mikan
- Origin: Japan

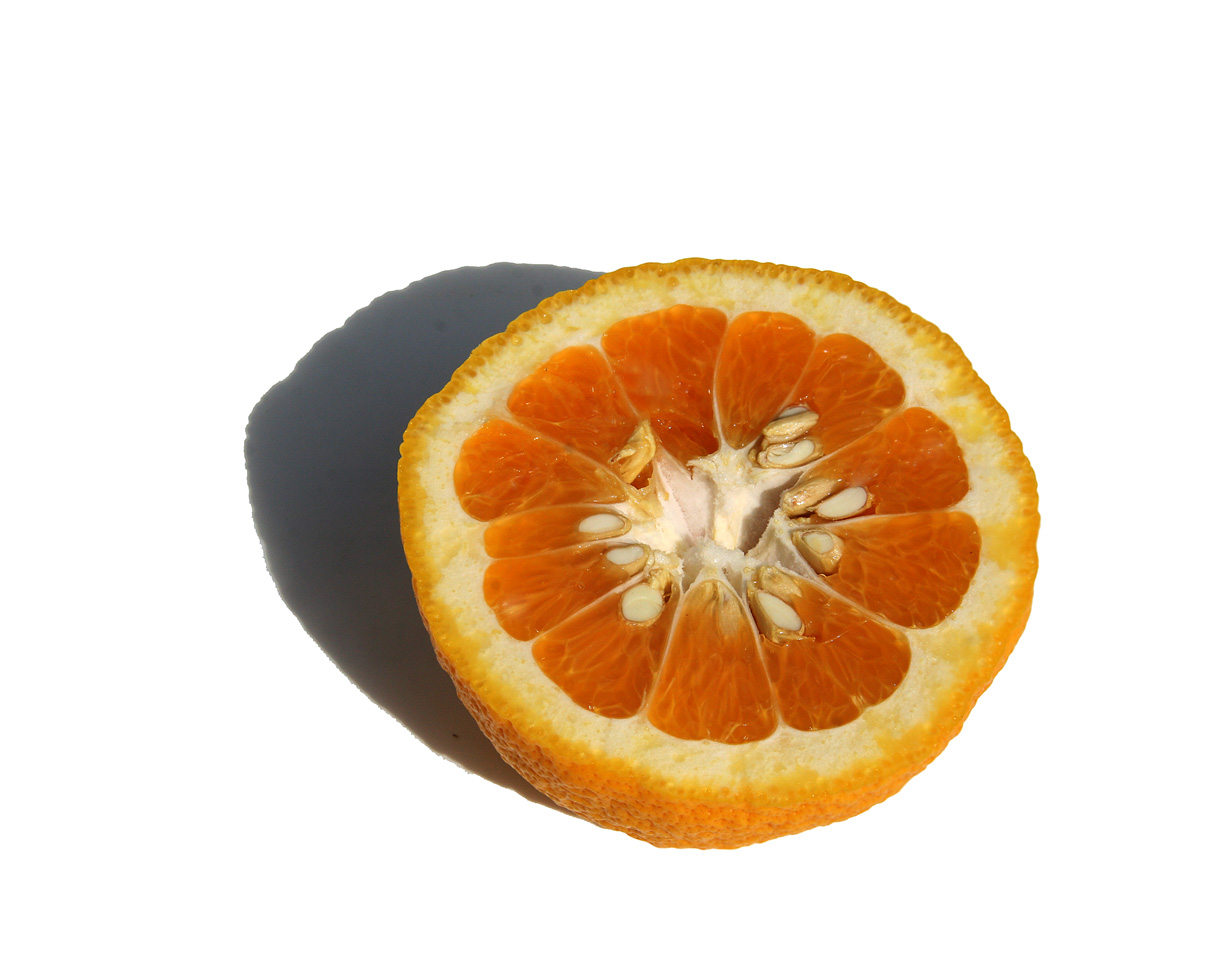
A slice of the Kobayashi mikan fruit

Kobayashi mikan (Citrus natsudaidai × unshiu) is a Citrus hybrid cultivated for its edible fruit.

== Genetics ==
Kobayashi mikan is a graft chimera between an amanatsu (Citrus natsudaidai) and a satsuma mandarin (Citrus unshiu).

== Distribution ==
It is cultivated and occurs naturally in Japan and is also grown in California.

== Description ==
The fruit is small to medium in size and oblate to round in shape. The rind is mostly smooth but is normally slightly rough and is medium to bright orange in color. The flesh is dark orange and moderately seedy. The flavor is said to be tart. The tree is densely branched and has a broad crown, and the leaves are elliptical in shape. It has been cultivated for over 70 years.

== See also ==
- Kinkoji unshiu
- Japanese citrus
- List of citrus fruits
