= Kanpei =

Citrus fruit

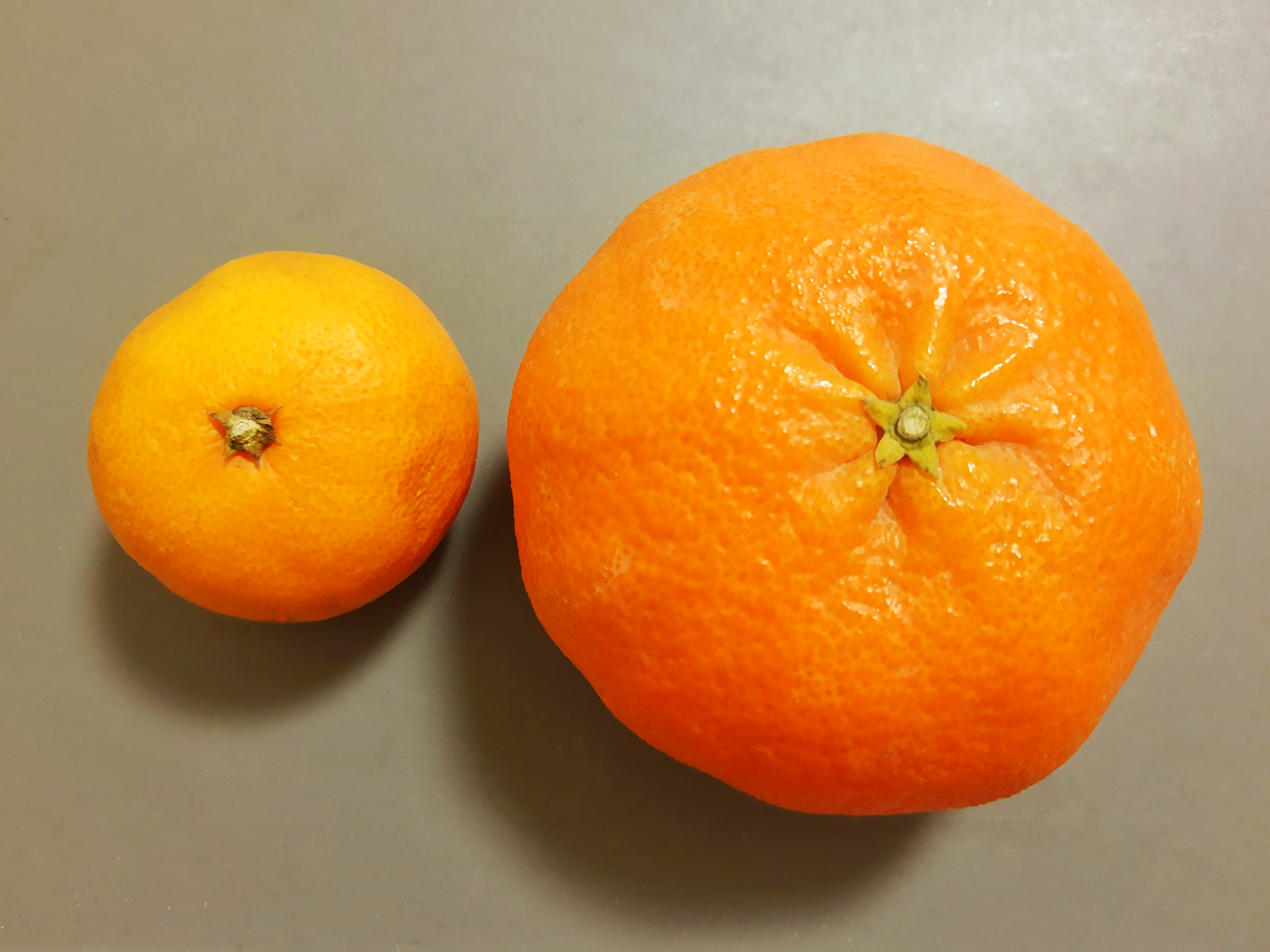
- Unshu mikan (left) and kanpei (right)
- Genus: Citrus
- Species: Citrus reticulata
- Hybrid parentage: Dekopon × Nishinokaori
- Cultivar: 'Kanpei'
- Origin: Japan

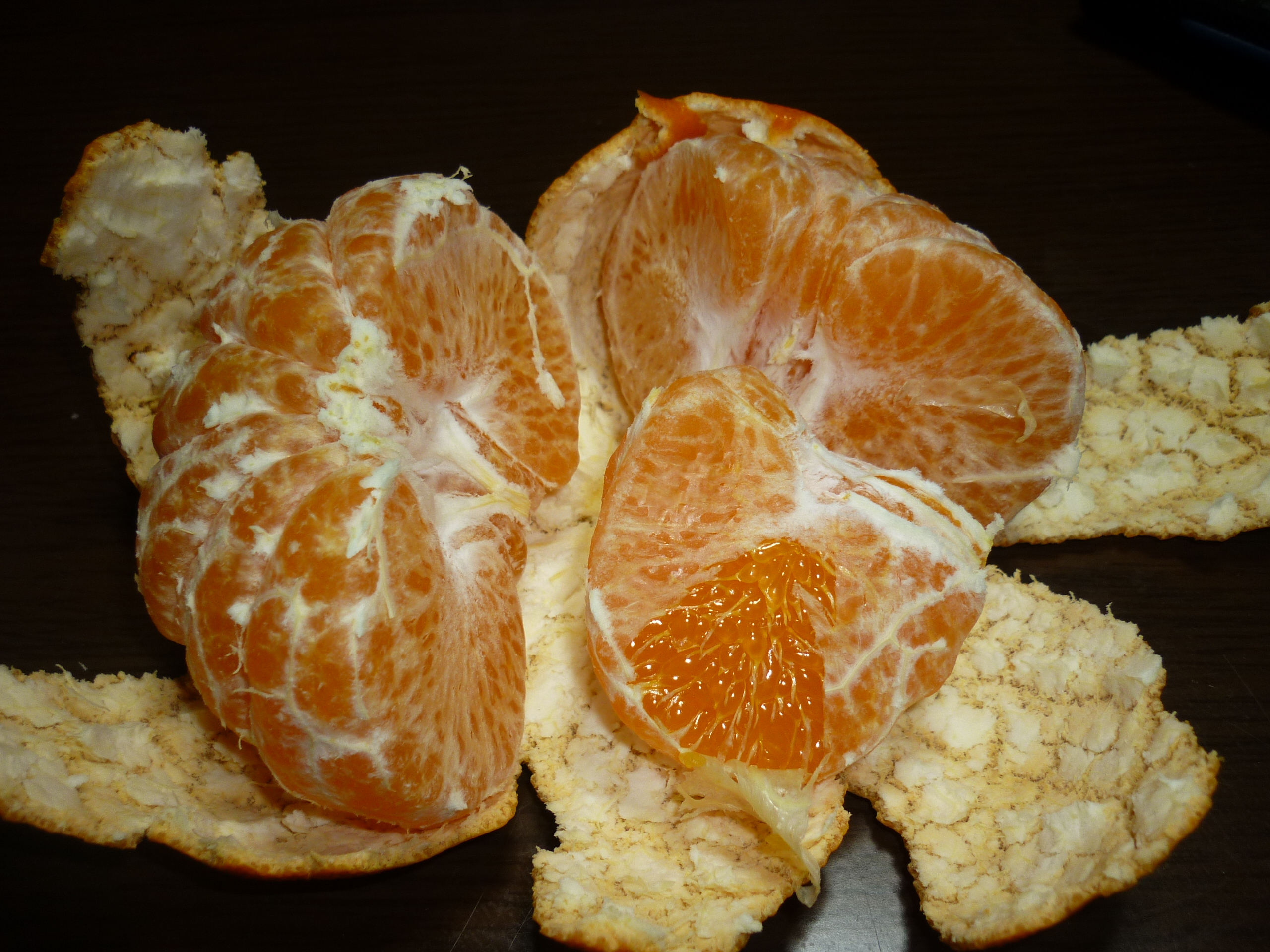
A peeled kanpei fruit

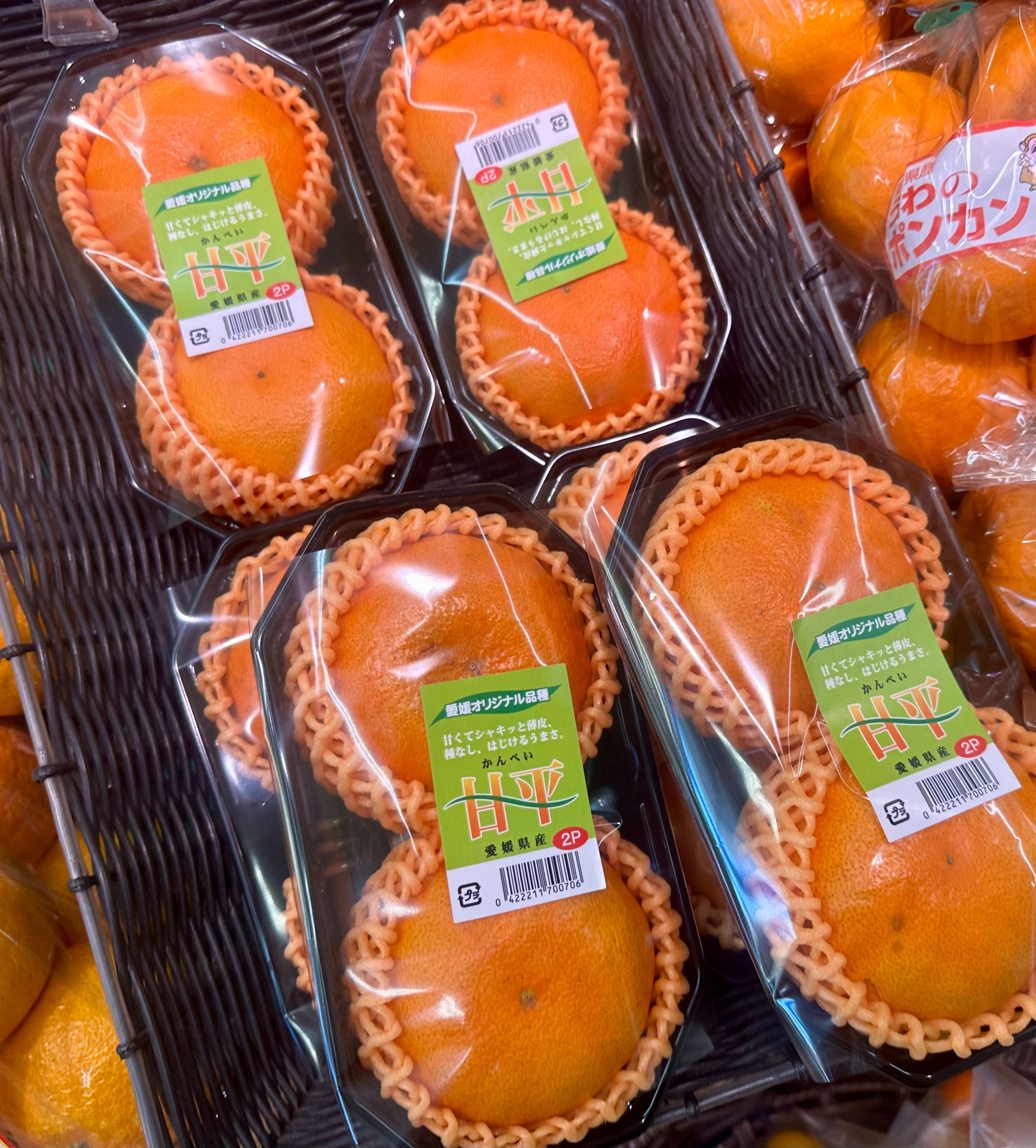
Kanpei fruits packaged for sale in Japan

Kanpei, also known as Ehime queen splash, is a Citrus cultivar that originated in Japan.

== Genetics ==
Kanpei was created by crossing the dekopon and nishinokaori varieties in 1991, although it was not officially introduced until August 2007.

== Description ==
The tree is vigorous and grows upright until the onset of fruit. The thorns are initially large and robust but become smaller with age, and fruit-bearing branches are thornless. The fruit ripens from January to March and weighs on average 0.5 pounds (230 grams) and is oblate in shape. The rind is orange in color and is mostly smooth but slightly bumpy; the flesh is orange to red-orange in color. It peels easily and puffing is rare. It is typically a seedless fruit, although when pollinated by surrounding cultivars, may contain a few seeds. It is a firm fruit and is said to have a sweet, rich flavor. The sugar content rating is at least 13 °Bx and the citric acid content is 1%. The fruit cracks easily in summer and autumn.

== Uses ==
It is sold and cultivated in Japan, especially in Ehime Prefecture, and is most commonly eaten raw. It is sometimes used in desserts.

== See also ==
- Japanese citrus
- List of citrus fruits
