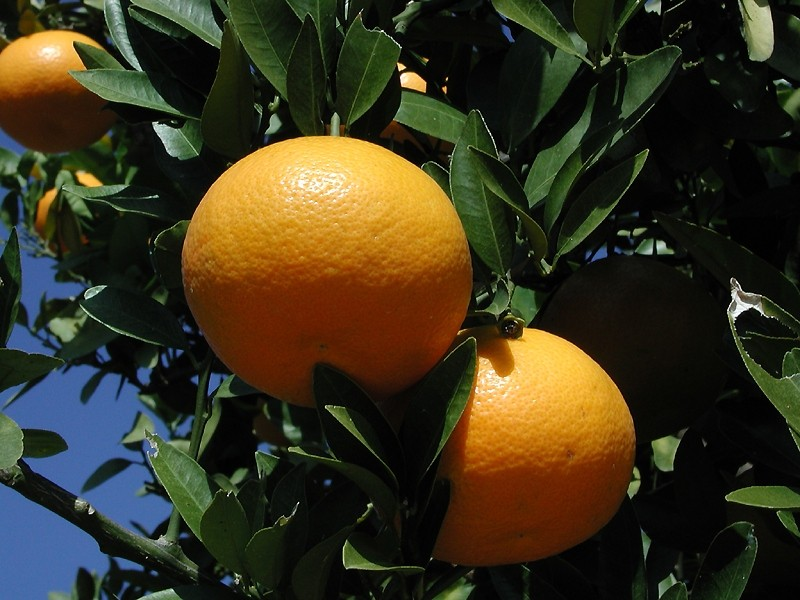

Scientific classification
- Kingdom: Plantae
- Clade: Tracheophytes
- Clade: Angiosperms
- Clade: Eudicots
- Clade: Rosids
- Order: Sapindales
- Family: Rutaceae
- Genus: Citrus
- Species: C. × iyo

Binomial name
- Citrus × iyo Hort. ex Tanaka

= Iyokan =

Citrus fruit and plant

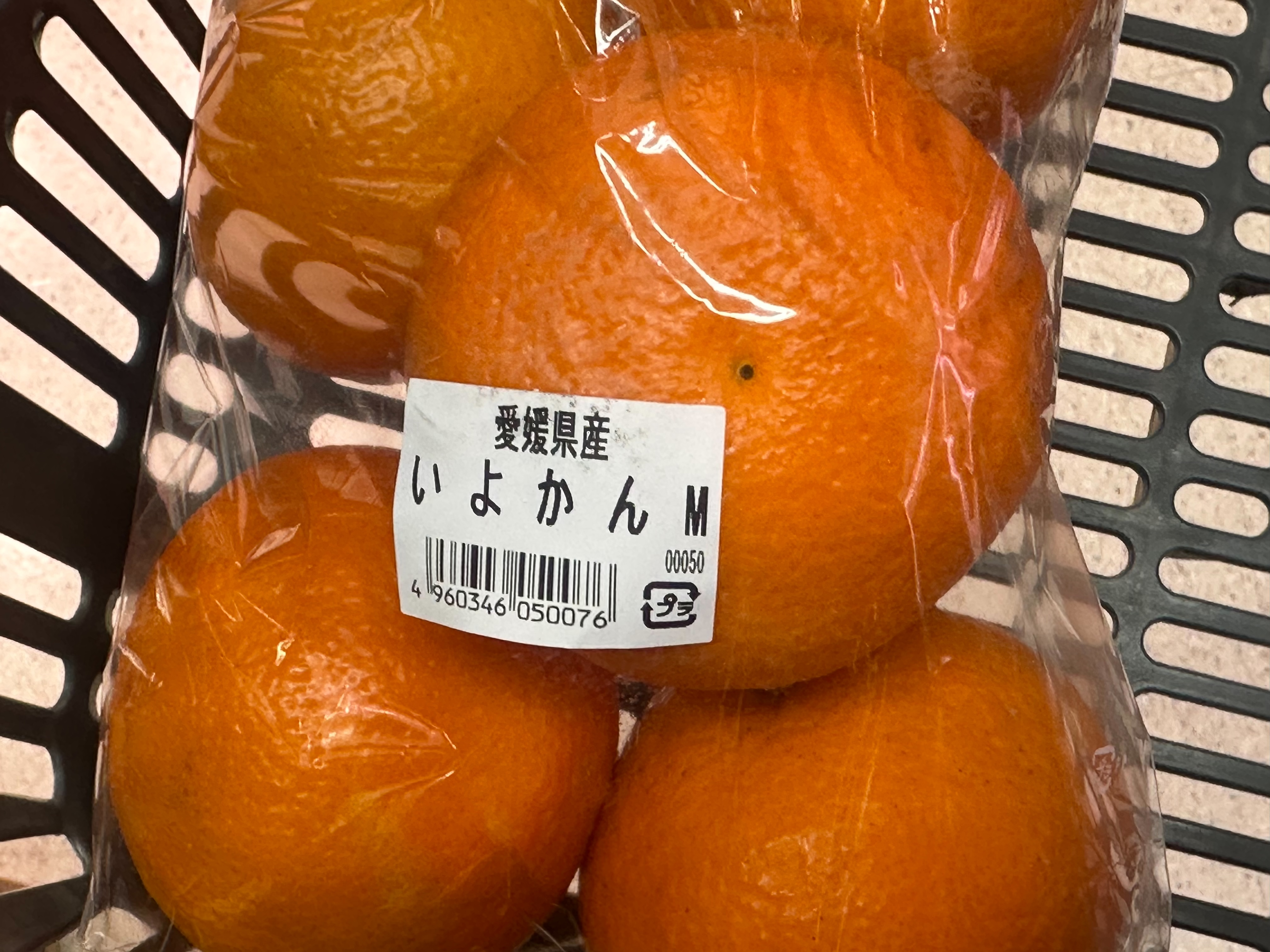
Iyokan for sale in Japan.

The iyokan (伊予柑 - Citrus × iyo), also known as anadomikan (穴門みかん) and Gokaku no Iyokan, is a Japanese citrus fruit, similar in appearance to a mandarin orange, with Dancy as the pollen parent and Kaikokan as the seed parent. It is the second most widely produced citrus fruit in Japan after the satsuma mandarin (Citrus unshiu). Ehime Prefecture accounted for 90% of Iyokan production in 2021.

Iyokan was discovered in 1886 in the orchard of Masamichi Nakamura, a resident of Yamaguchi Prefecture. In 1889, Yasunori Miyoshi, a resident of Ehime Prefecture, bought the original tree and brought it home, and it became a specialty of Ehime Prefecture. Originally marketed as "Iyo mikan", it was renamed "Iyokan" in 1930 to avoid confusion with Unshu mikan (Citrus unshiu). The name "Iyo" was taken from the ancient name of a place in Ehime Prefecture, the Iyo province.

== Description ==
The peel is thicker than that of a mikan, but it can be peeled by hand. The skin is very shiny and brightly colored and, once peeled, the flesh gives off a very strong scent. The flesh is slightly sour and more bitter than an orange, but sweeter than a grapefruit.

There is a variation grown into a pentagon shape to promote good luck and to revive the popularity of the fruit, also giving it another nickname, Gokaku no Iyokan, which translates into "Pentagonal Iyokan" It is sometimes placed into fish feed to mask the fishy flavor.

In Japan, the citrus can be seen during springtime as a seasonal KitKat flavor with messages of "good luck" to students studying for exams on each packet. The name "iyokan" is also a near-homophone for "good feeling" in Japanese, and is used as such in its marketing.

== See also ==
- Amanatsu
- Jabara (citrus)
- Tangor
- Yuukou
- Yuzu
