= Japanese bitter orange =

Japanese bitter orange may refer to:

- Poncirus trifoliata: Trifoliate orange, Japanese bitter-orange (Japanese: カラタチ, Hepburn: karatachi), hardy orange, Chinese bitter orange
- Citrus ×daidai (Daidai): variety of bitter orange (Citrus ×aurantium), Japanese bitter orange (Japanese: ダイダイ, Hepburn: daidai)
- Aegle marmelos: bael/bili/bhel, Bengal quince, golden apple, Japanese bitter orange (Japanese: ベルノキ, Hepburn: berunoki, also ベンガルカラタチ (bengaru karatachi)), stone apple, wood apple
