= Ikurō =

- Gender: Male

Origin
- Origin: Japanese
- Meaning: Different meanings depending on the kanji used

Ikurō, Ikuro, Ikuroh or Ikurou (written: 郁郎 or 幾郎) is a masculine Japanese given name. Notable people with the name include:

- Ikuro Takahashi (高橋 幾郎), Japanese musician
- Ikuro Takahashi (botanist) (高橋 郁郎) (1892–1981), Japanese botanist
- Ikurō Teshima (手島 アブラハム 郁郎, Teshima Abraham Ikurō) (1910–1973), Japanese religious leader
