= Ikuro Takahashi (botanist) =

Japanese botanist (1892–1981)

- 高橋 郁郎
- Born: 1892; Kumomi Onsen, Iwashina, Shizuoka, Japan
- Died: 1981 (aged 88–89)
- Education: Shizuoka Prefectural Nakaizumi Nōgakko
- Known for: "Father of Citrus," citrus cultivation, Citrus sulcata
- Children: Yutaka Takahashi, Yuriko Takahashi
- Awards: Takahashi Citrus Prize (posthumous)
- Scientific career
- Fields: Botany, horticulture
- Workplaces: Ministry of Agriculture and Commerce; Horticultural Experiment Station; Shizuoka Prefectural Citrus Experiment Station

Ikuro Takahashi (高橋 郁郎, Takahashi Ikurō; 1892–1981) was a Japanese botanist, specializing in citrus, who was hailed as the "father of citrus" especially in his native Shizuoka Prefecture.

After graduating from the prefectural nōgakko (ja) or "agricultural college," he enrolled in the apprenticeship/internship system established by the then-Ministry of Agriculture and Commerce, and learned his skills at the local state-run agricultural experiment station under the Horticultural Department. After a stint in Kumamoto Prefecture, he returned to the old department which was being reorganized as the ministerial Horticultural Experiment Station, where he served as horticultural engineer (1921). Later he served his home prefecture, and was appointed the first head of the Shizuoka Prefectural Citrus Experiment Station, which was his own brainchild (1940). His chief work includes Kankitsu ("Citrus"), which went through some five revisions. He was the long-time chief writer and editor of Kajitsu Nippon, a journal of fruit agriculture.

He published the scientific name Citrus sulcata hort. ex. Ik.Takah. (or I.Takah.) for a type of citrus known as sanbokan.

== General ==
He conducted numerous experiments and data-collection for growing citrus, exploring and field testing various soil improvement, fertilizing, parasite prevention, disinfection, and pruning techniques. The knowledge he amassed he lectured nationwide. Keeping abreast of orange industries abroad, particularly America, he would frequently provide first in-depth coverage in Japan of citrus-growing techniques developed overseas. Not strictly limited to concerns about orchard technology, he also addressed economic issues such as international pricing and competition, the future viability of canned mandarin oranges and juices, and the need for producers' cooperatives (shukka kumiai), and was outspoken even about taxation of orchards.

During World War II, he opposed national policy to log down orchards to be converted into potato and wheat fields. After the war, he made strenuous efforts to revive the satsuma orange industry.

His eldest son Yutaka Takahashi is an academic in civil engineering and emeritus professor at Tokyo University. His eldest daughter, Yuriko Takahashi taught nursing at Aichi Prefectural Junior College of Nursing.

== Timeline ==
- 1892: Born in Kumomi Onsen, in the village of Iwashina (now Matsuzaki, Shizuoka)
- 1909: Graduated from Shizuoka Prefectural Nakaizumi Nōgakko (Agricultural College) (now Iwata Agricultural High School）.
- 1909: Internship at the nation's Ministry of Agriculture and Commerce established agricultural experiment station, Horticultural Department at Okitsu, Shimizu-ku, Shizuoka (now the Okitsu Citrus Research Station for the National Institute of Fruit Tree Science (NIFTS)).
- 1913: Published Kankitsu saibai ("Citrus Culture")
- 1917: Invited to Kumamoto Prefecture as agricultural engineer.
- 1921: The Horticultural Department is spun off as an independent Horticultural Experiment Station (農商務省園芸試験場, Nōmushō engei shikenjō) (later to become NIFTS). Appointed here as horticultural engineer.
- 1931: Published Kankitsu, a revision of his earlier work. This title undergoes five revisions.
- 1935: Appointed citrus engineer for Shizuoka Prefecture.
- 1940: Appointed to head the newly created Shizuoka Prefectural Citrus Experiment Station.
- 1946: Nihon Kajitsu Kyōkai (日本果実協会, "Japan Fruit Society") established, with the organization publication Kajitsu Nippon (果実日本) for which Takahashi served as editor-in-chief.
- 1948: "Japan Fruit Society" becomes the Nichienren (Japan Fruit Growers Cooperative Association).
- 1962: Retired from Nichienren.
- 1981: Died at age 89. The posthumous "Takahashi Kankitsu Kenshōkai" was founded which awards the "Takashi Citrus Prize".

== See also ==
- Chōzaburō Tanaka, another Japanese botanist
