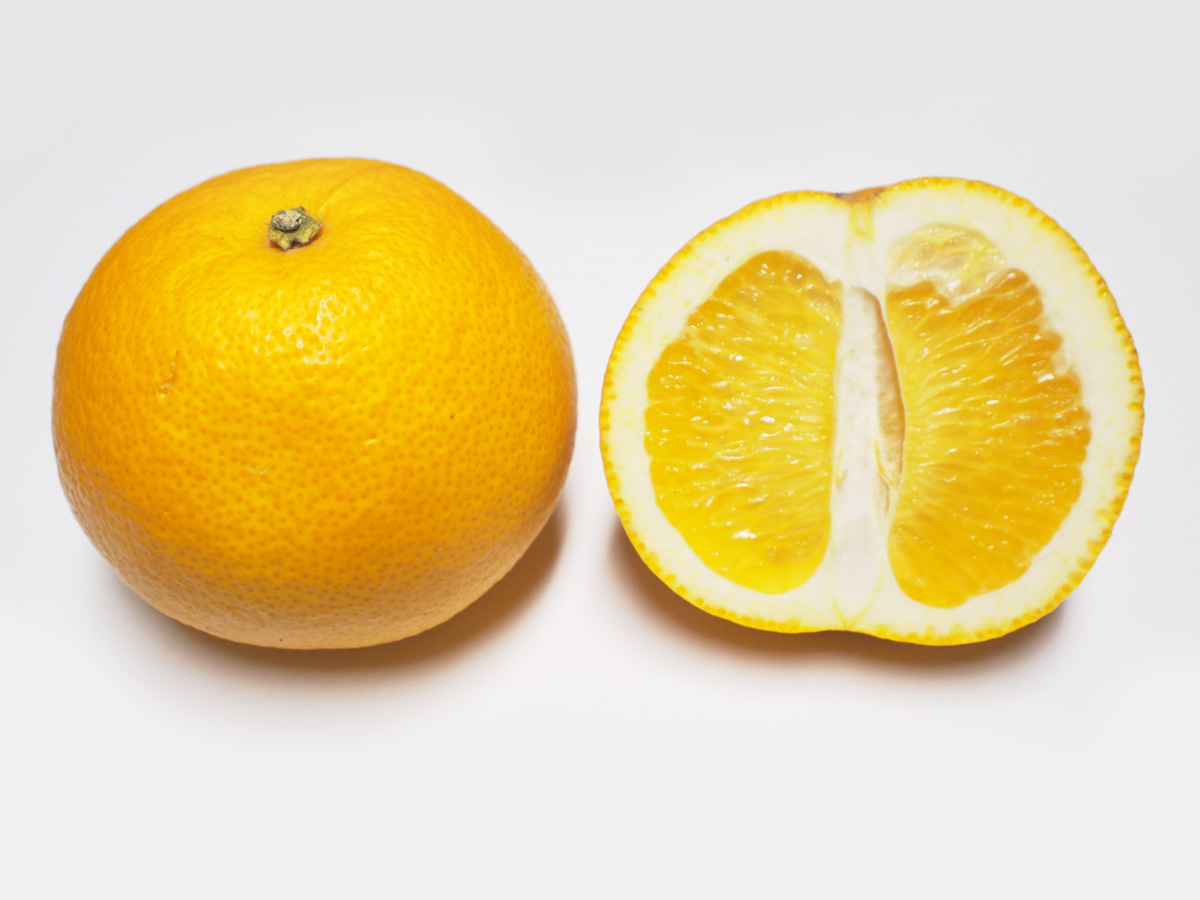
- Hassaku, whole and sectioned

Scientific classification
- Kingdom: Plantae
- Clade: Tracheophytes
- Clade: Angiosperms
- Clade: Eudicots
- Clade: Rosids
- Order: Sapindales
- Family: Rutaceae
- Genus: Citrus
- Species: C. hassaku

Binomial name
- Citrus hassaku Hort. ex Yu.Tanaka

= Hassaku =

Citrus fruit and plant

Hassaku (Japanese: 八朔, pronounced [ha̠sːa̠kɯ̟]), Citrus hassaku, is a Japanese citrus hybrid between pomelo and mandarin, with pomelo-like characteristics. The original plant was discovered near the Mitsugon Jōdo temple in Innoshima, Hiroshima Prefecture, Japan.

== Origin ==
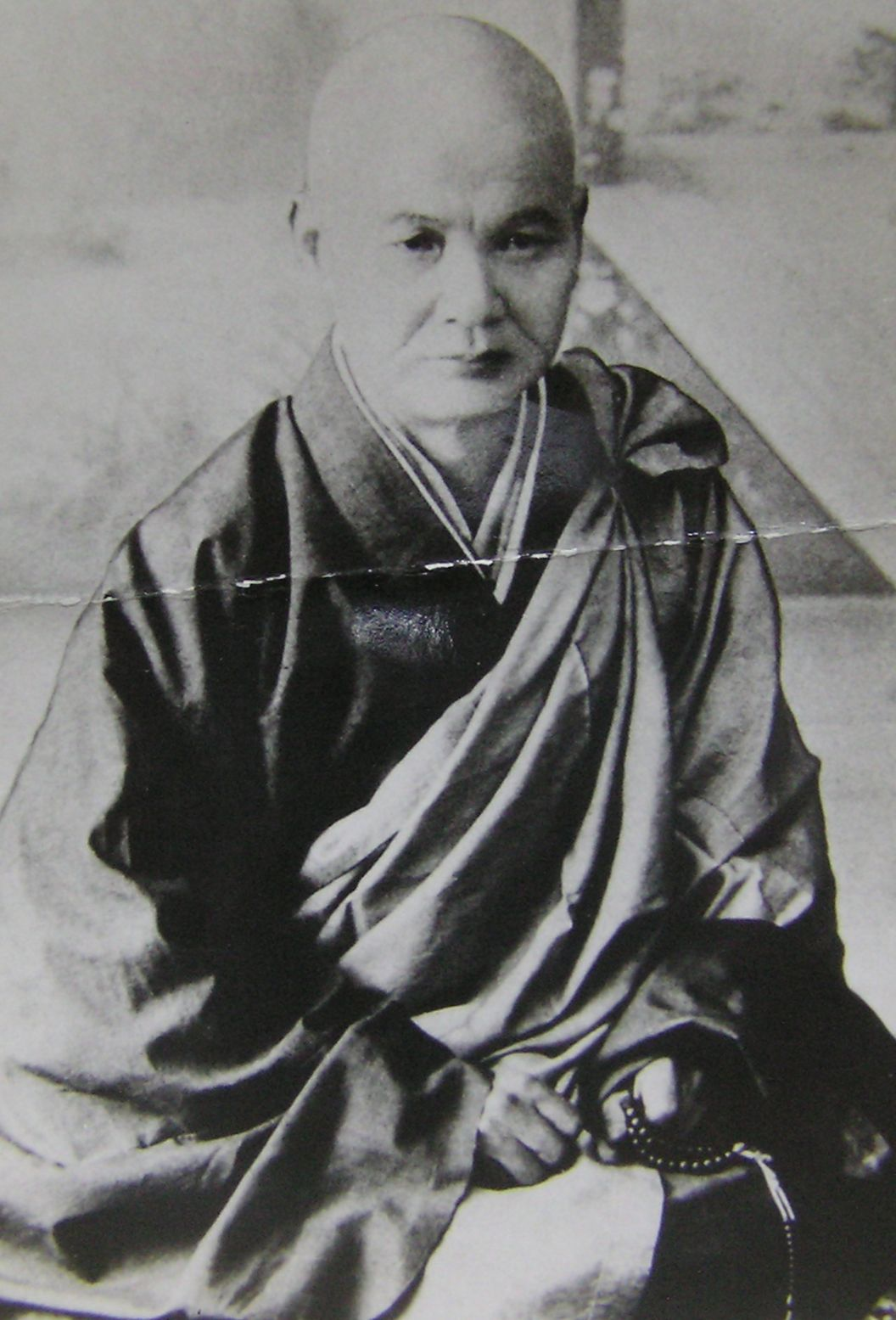
Ogō Etoku Shōnin

Hassaku is probably a natural pomelo × mandarin hybrid, with pomelo-like characteristics. It was discovered by Ogō Etoku Shōnin during the Edo period at the Mitsugon Jōdo temple in Innoshima (now part of Onomichi), Hiroshima Prefecture, Japan. In 1860, it was noted and named "jagada", later changed to hassaku (Japanese: 八朔), referring to the first day of August of the old Japanese lunar calendar, when the fruit ripened on the tree. According to Cécile Didierjean, who offered hassaku as an offering to the Shinto god Kōjin in Ōmi in March as a seasonal fruit. Hassaku was not propagated and planted commercially until about 1925.

The allele sharing test performed by Tokurou Shimizu et al. (2016) gives its progenitors: pomelo (Citrus maxima) and the Kunembo mandarin (Citrus nobilis). The same results show that various citrus fruits are hybrids of hassaku (May pomelo and Yellow pummelo, with Hirado buntan pollinator, Summer Fresh with natsudaidai pollinator), and Sweet Spring pollination of a satsuma).

== Description ==
The hassaku tree is vigorous, upright, virtually thornless. The leaves are broad and pummelo-like, but petiole wings are narrower, approaching sweet orange.

Hassaku fruit is medium to large (9-10 cm in diameter) and slightly oblate, seedy, and monoembryonic. The skin color is orange-yellow, moderately thick, and slightly grainy. The segments are numerous; the axis is broad and semi-hollow at maturity. The flesh color is light yellow. It is not very juicy but flavor is good. The fruit matures early in midseason, stores only moderately well. The fruits are harvested in winter, but eaten several weeks or months later, when the bitterness has become milder.

== Cultivation ==
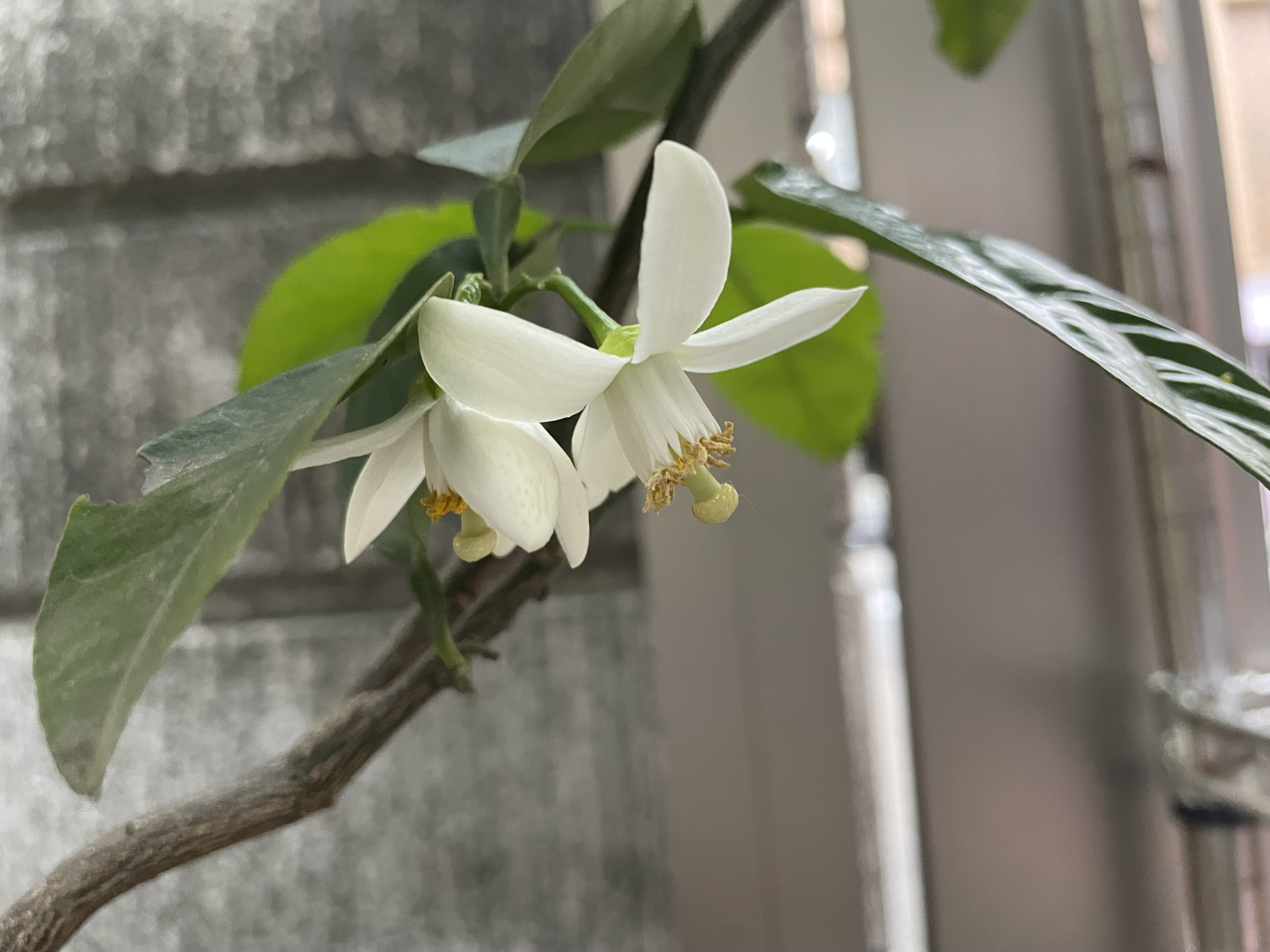
Hassaku flower

In 1964, it was reported that hassaku cultivation in Japan exceeded 2,500 acres, mostly in the Hiroshima prefecture of its origin. However, during the 1960s, hassaku has been increasingly planted elsewhere.

Today, most hassaku is produced in Wakayama Prefecture, representing about 60% of the Japanese output.

Several populations of the trees were infested with Citrus tristeza virus which caused stunted growth and destroyed the harvest after 15-20 years.

== Use ==
An extraction from the young fruits has been used medically in skin care treatments for patients with atopic dermatitis.

== Others ==
Hassa-kun is a local mascot character which represents Innoshima in Hiroshima Prefecture to enhance image and promote tourism.
