= Kinkoji unshiu =

Hybrid species of fruit and plant

- Genus: Citrus
- Species: Citrus reticulata
- Hybrid parentage: Kinkoji × satsuma
- Cultivar: Kinkoji unshiu
- Origin: Japan

Kinkoji unshiu (Citrus obovoidea × unshiu) is a Citrus hybrid cultivated for its edible fruit.

== Genetics ==
Kinkoji unshiu is a graft chimera between the kinkoji (Citrus obovoidea) and the satsuma mandarin (Citrus unshiu).

== Distribution ==
It is cultivated and occurs naturally in Japan and is also grown in California.

== Description ==
The fruit is moderately large (around the size of a grapefruit) and pomelo-like in shape. The rind is of a medium thickness (slightly thinner than that of a pomelo) and is pale to dark yellow in color. The flesh is bright orange in color and moderately seedy. The tree is densely branched and the leaves are leathery and ovate to elliptical in shape. The flesh is juicy and has been described as having a pleasant flavor but rather mild and flat. It has been cultivated for over 70 years.

== See also ==
- Kobayashi mikan
- Japanese citrus
- List of citrus fruits
