= Sanbokan =

Citrus fruit and plant

'Sanbokan'
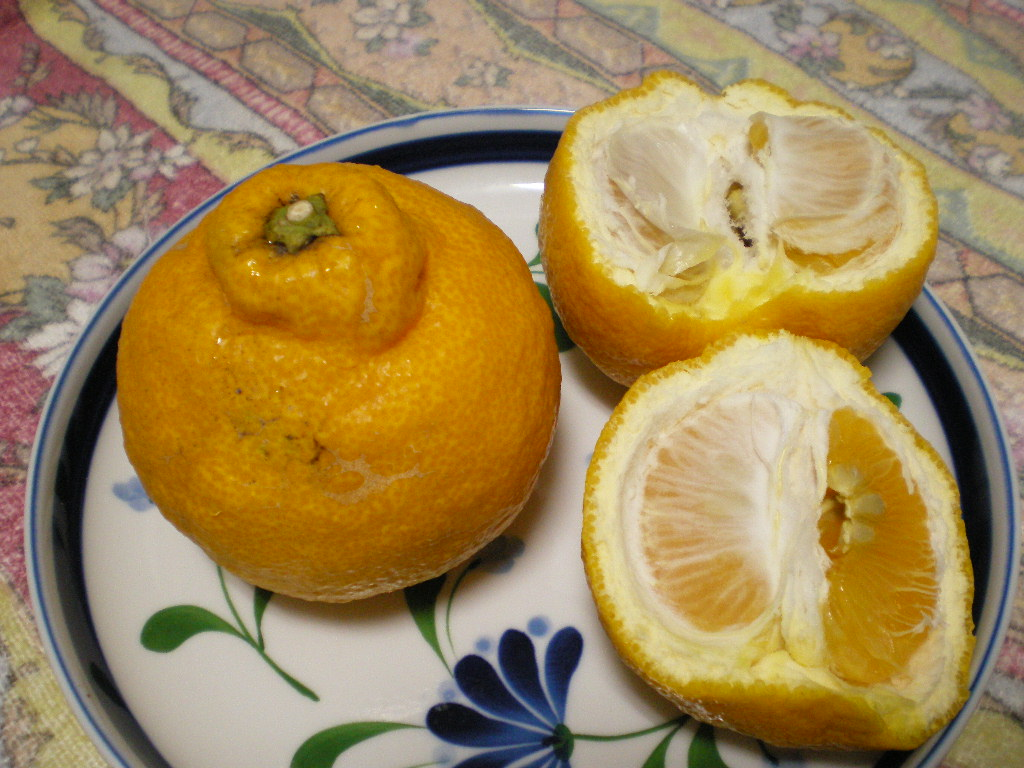
- Sanbokan - whole and halved
- Species: Citrus sulcata
- Cultivar: 'Sanbokan'
- Origin: Japan

Sanbokan (Citrus sulcata Takahashi, ja:さんぼうかん or 'Sanbokan', ) is a Japanese citrus fruit of the Wakayama prefecture similar to a mandarin orange, easily distinguished by its pronounced basal nipple.

Parentage is unknown. Fruit is moderately juicy and of a good flavor. 'Sanbokan' is late ripening. Its juice is a blend of sweet orange and grapefruit, also it has thick peel.

== Medicinal ==
Researchers at the Yuanpei University said that they have evaluated the antioxidant and anti-inflammatory activities of the 'sanbokan' extracts.
