= Dekopon =

Variety of orange

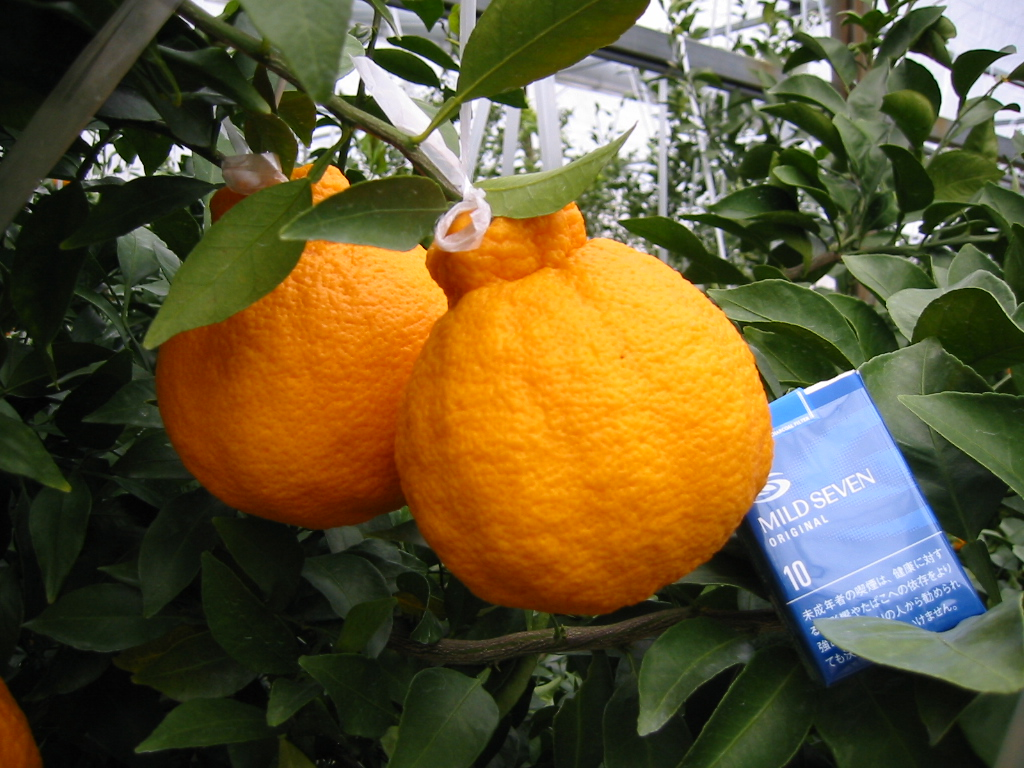
- Dekopon on tree
- Hybrid parentage: Kiyomi x ponkan [(C. unshiu x sinensis) x C. poonensis]
- Origin: developed in Japan in 1972

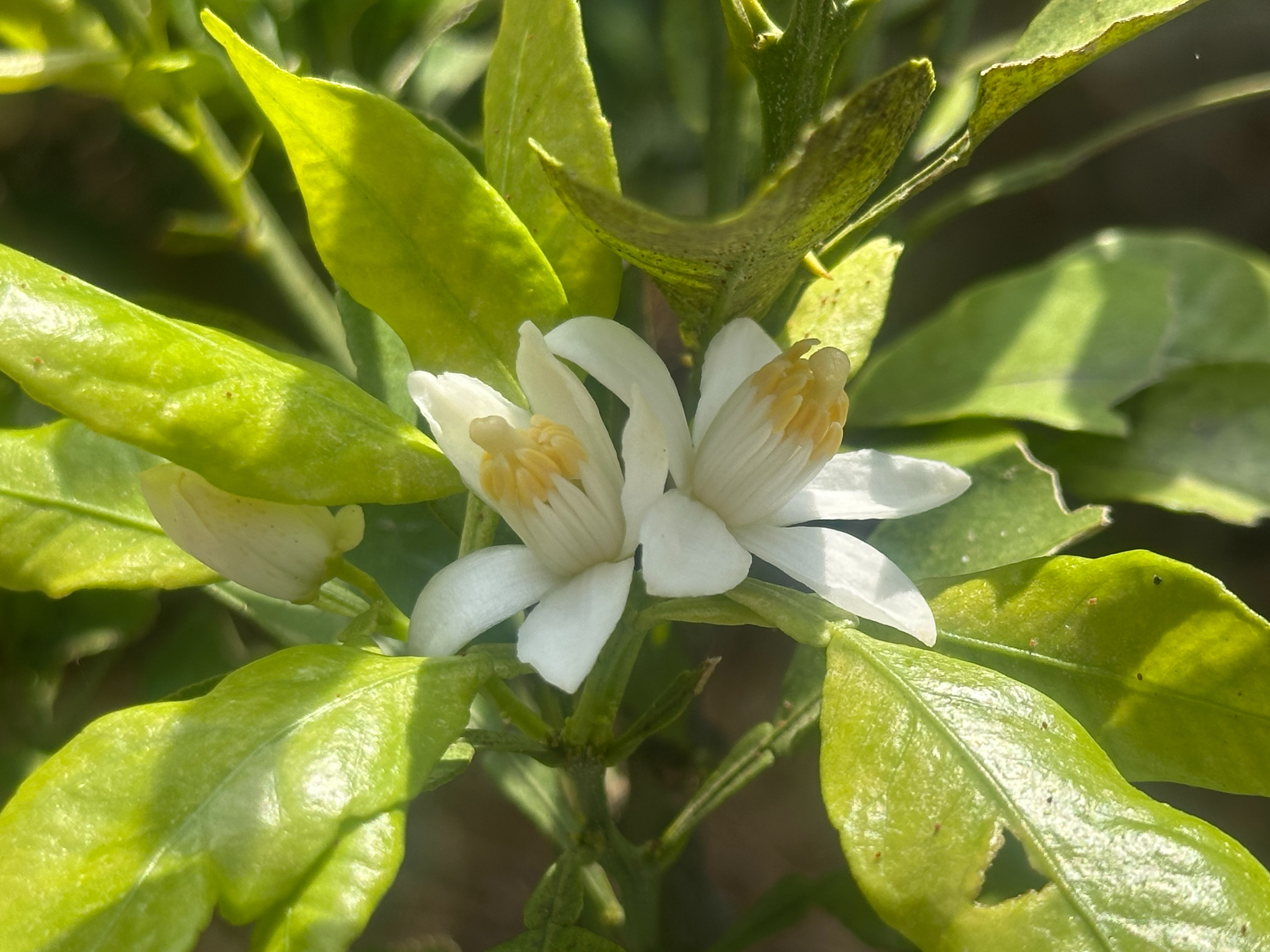
Dekopon blossom

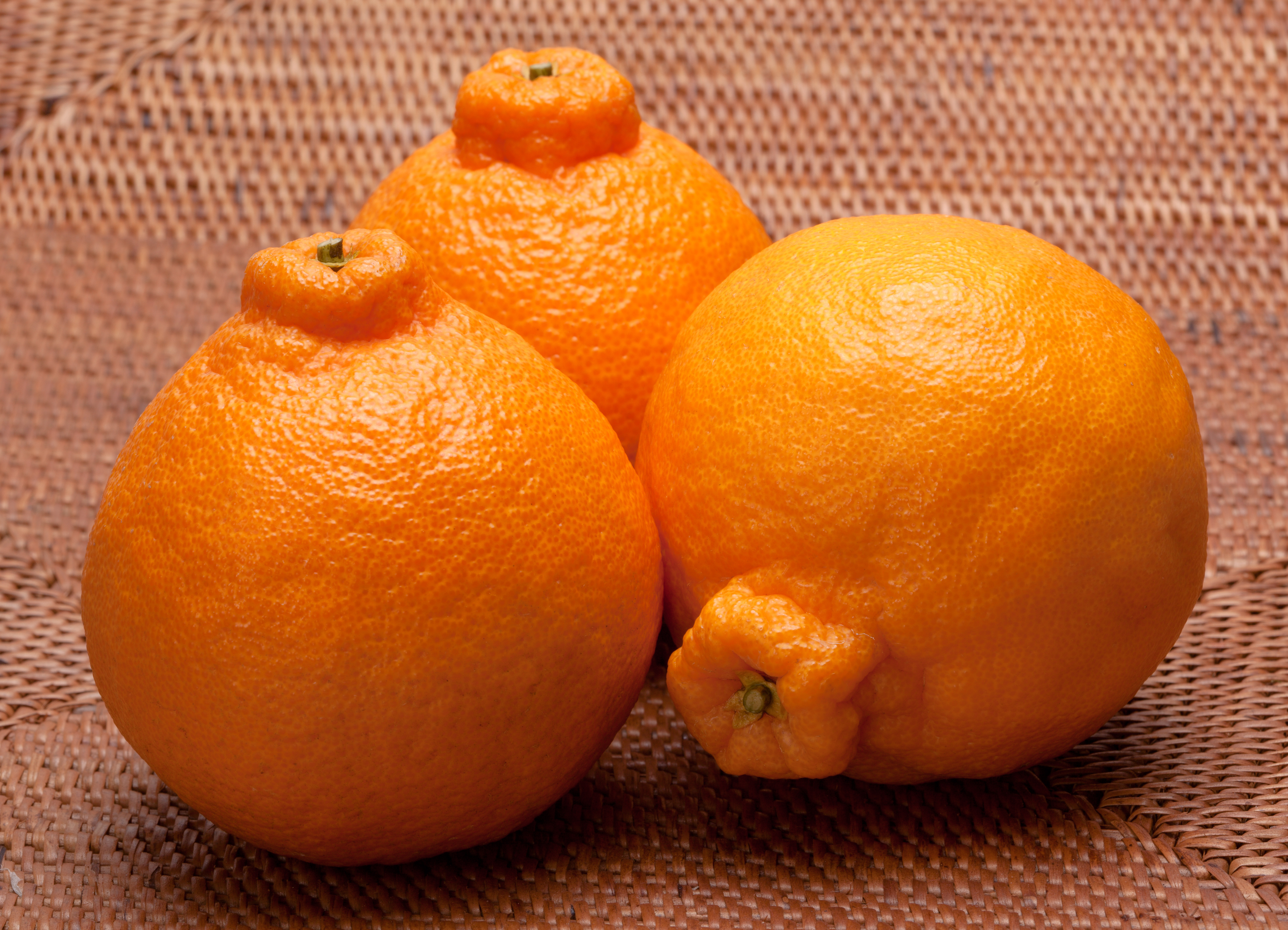
Dekopon

Dekopon (デコポン) is a seedless variety of satsuma orange, known for its distinctive sweet taste, large size, and large protruding bump on the top. It is a hybrid between Kiyomi and ponkan (Nakano no. 3), developed in Japan in 1972.

Originally a brand name, "Dekopon" has become a genericized trademark and is used to refer to all brands of the fruit. The generic name is shiranuhi or shiranui (不知火). In South Korea, dekopon is called hallabong (한라봉). In the US, the dekopon was released as a commercial product under the name "Sumo Citrus". In Brazil, dekopon is marketed under the brand name Kinsei.

== Names ==
The name is most likely a portmanteau of the word deko (凸, デコ; meaning convex) as a reference to its bump, and the pon in ponkan (ポンカン; one of the fruits that it is derived from) to create "dekopon" (デコポン).

There were many market names for dekopon during the time the name was a trademark of the product from Kumamoto. For instance, himepon was the market name for the fruits originating from Ehime prefecture. The ones grown in Hiroshima prefecture were marketed as hiropon. After an agreement whereby anyone could use the name "dekopon" by paying a fee and meeting certain quality standards, the name was used for the fruit no matter where it came from in Japan.

'Dekopon' does not have an agricultural variety registration number (Nōrin Bangō) because of its bump, which at the time of its development was considered to be unsightly, and failure to reduce acidity in the fruit.

== Cultivation ==
The fruits are usually grown in large greenhouses to keep them at a constant temperature, and are harvested from December to February (winter in Japan). In the case of garden farming, they are harvested from March to April. After harvesting, dekopon are usually left for a period of 20–40 days so that the levels of citric acid in the fruit decrease, while the sugar levels increase to make a more appealing taste to market. Only fruits with sugar level above 13°Bx and citric acid below 1.0% can be sold with the name dekopon.

2006 Area under cultivation of Citrus in Japan (hectares)

No.	Variety	Area under cultivation
1	Mikan	46,000 (64.3%)
2	Iyokan	4,677 (6.5%)
3	Dekopon	3,068 (4.3%)
4	Natsumikan	2,800 (3.9%)
5	Ponkan	2,260 (3.2%)
	Total	71,515 (100%)

== Outside Japan ==
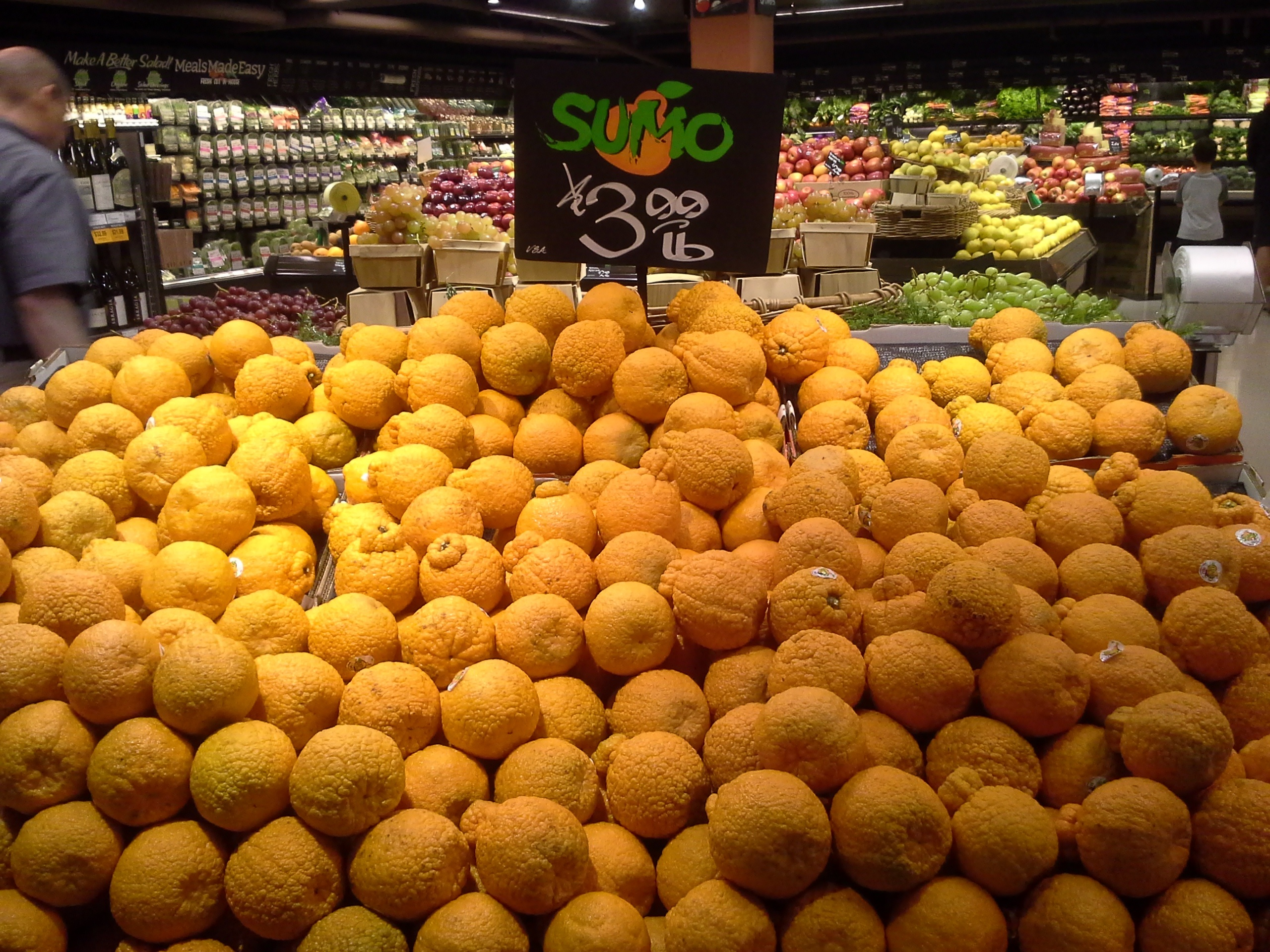
Dekopon oranges sold as "Sumo" in Seattle, United States

In Brazil, dekopon is marketed under the brand name of Kinsei which derived from the Japanese word for Venus. Brazilian farmers have succeeded in adapting the variety to tropical to temperate climate in the highlands of São Paulo state. The work was done by Unkichi Taniwaki, a farmer of Japanese origin. Kinsei is easily harvested from May to September. In the high season for kinsei, each fruit costs around US$0.50 at the Brazilian street market and supermarkets.

In South Korea, dekopon is called hallabong (한라봉) after Hallasan, the mountain located on Jeju Island where it is primarily grown. They were introduced to Korea from Japan in 1990.

The citrus budwood was imported into the United States in 1998 by a California citrus grower, Brad Stark Jr. The rights to the sterilized budwood were purchased in 2005 by the Griffith family, owners of the nursery TreeSource and packing facility Suntreat. The dekopon was released as a commercial product in the US under the name "Sumo Citrus" in early 2011.

== In culture ==
Dekopon have become so popular in Japan that the chewing candy brand giant Hi-Chew (ハイチュウ) has released a limited-edition dekopon flavor.

In commemoration of the 15th anniversary of the first shipment of dekopon, Japan Fruit Growers Cooperative Association designated 1 March "Dekopon day" in 2006.

== See also ==
- Fruit anatomy
