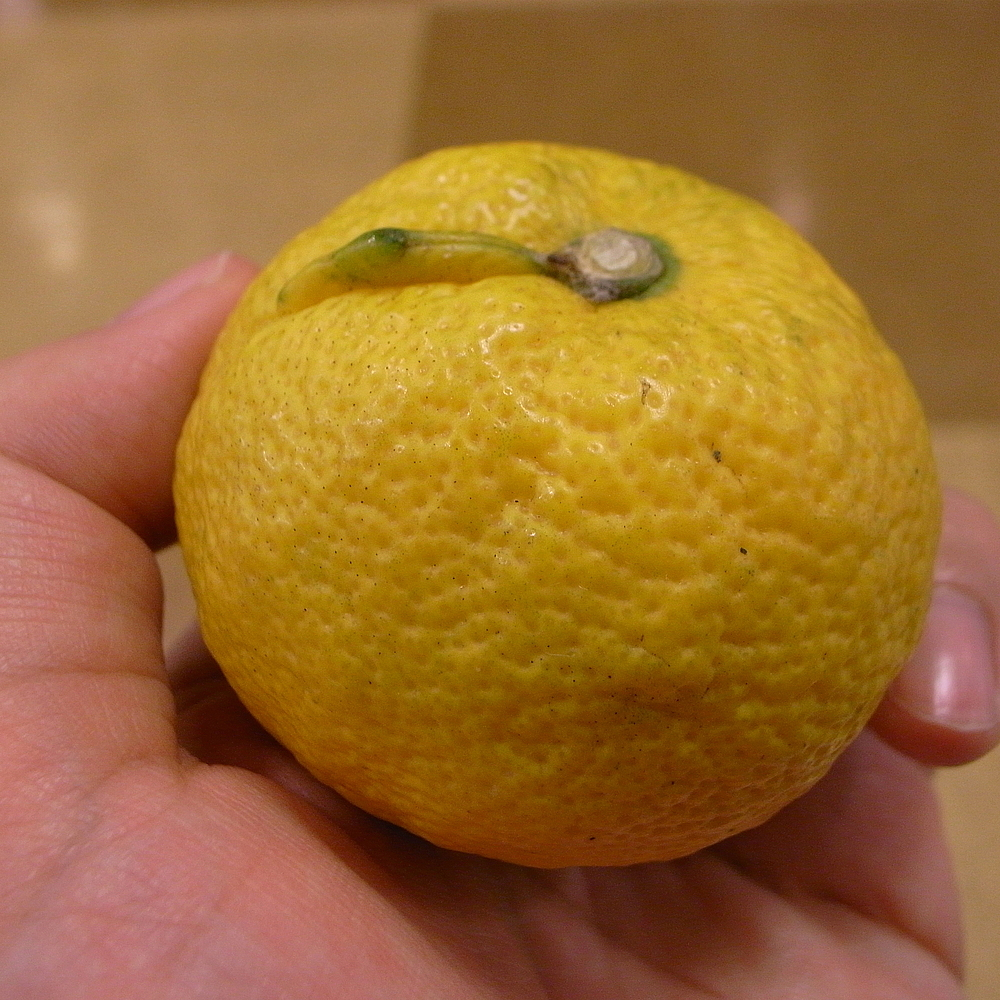
- Citrus jabara

Scientific classification
- Kingdom: Plantae
- (unranked): Angiosperms
- (unranked): Eudicots
- (unranked): Rosids
- Order: Sapindales
- Family: Rutaceae
- Genus: Citrus
- Species: C. × jabara

Binomial name
- Citrus × jabara Tanaka

= Jabara (citrus) =

Citrus fruit and plant

Jabara (Citrus × jabara) is a hybrid species of plant and fruit that is among the Japanese citrus.

Jabara is a fruit similar to the yuzu, deriving from a cross of the yuzu with a pomelo-hybridized mandarin (Citrus nobilis, but distinct from King), that arose naturally in Wakayama Prefecture, Japan.

== Other uses ==
- An extract made from the pericarp of the jabara has been used in cosmetics.
- Narirutin, a flavanoid compound found predominantly in the peels of jabara, has been researched for its potential effects in alleviating allergy symptoms associated with rhinoconjuctivitis.

== See also ==
- Yūkō
