= Yūkō =

Citrus fruit and plant

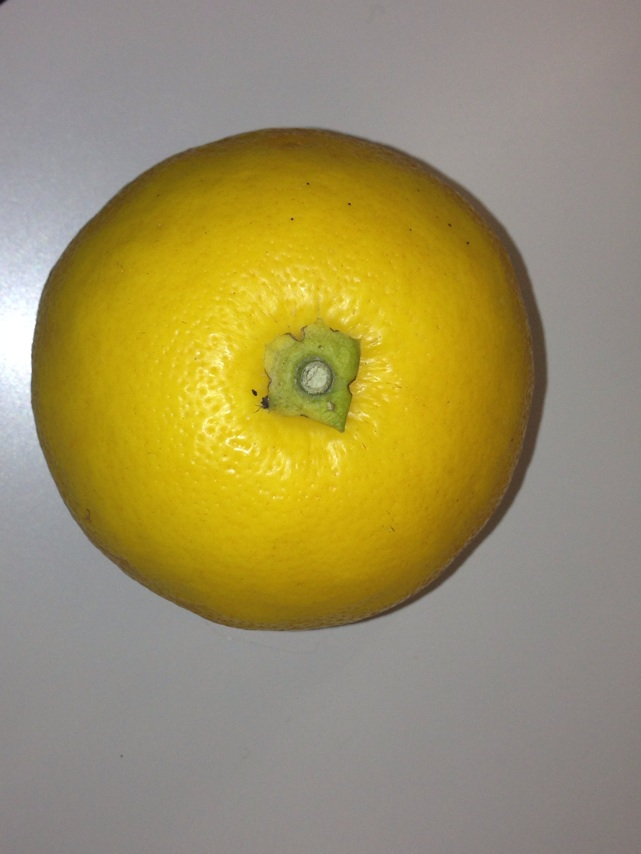
- Genus: Citrus
- Species: Citrus yuko
- Cultivar: Yuko
- Origin: Nagasaki Prefecture, Japan

The yūkō (ゆうこう), also written yukou, is a Japanese citrus found in the Nagasaki Prefecture and Saga Prefecture of Japan. Genetic analysis has shown it to be a cross between the kishumikan and koji, a part-tachibana orange hybrid native to Japan.

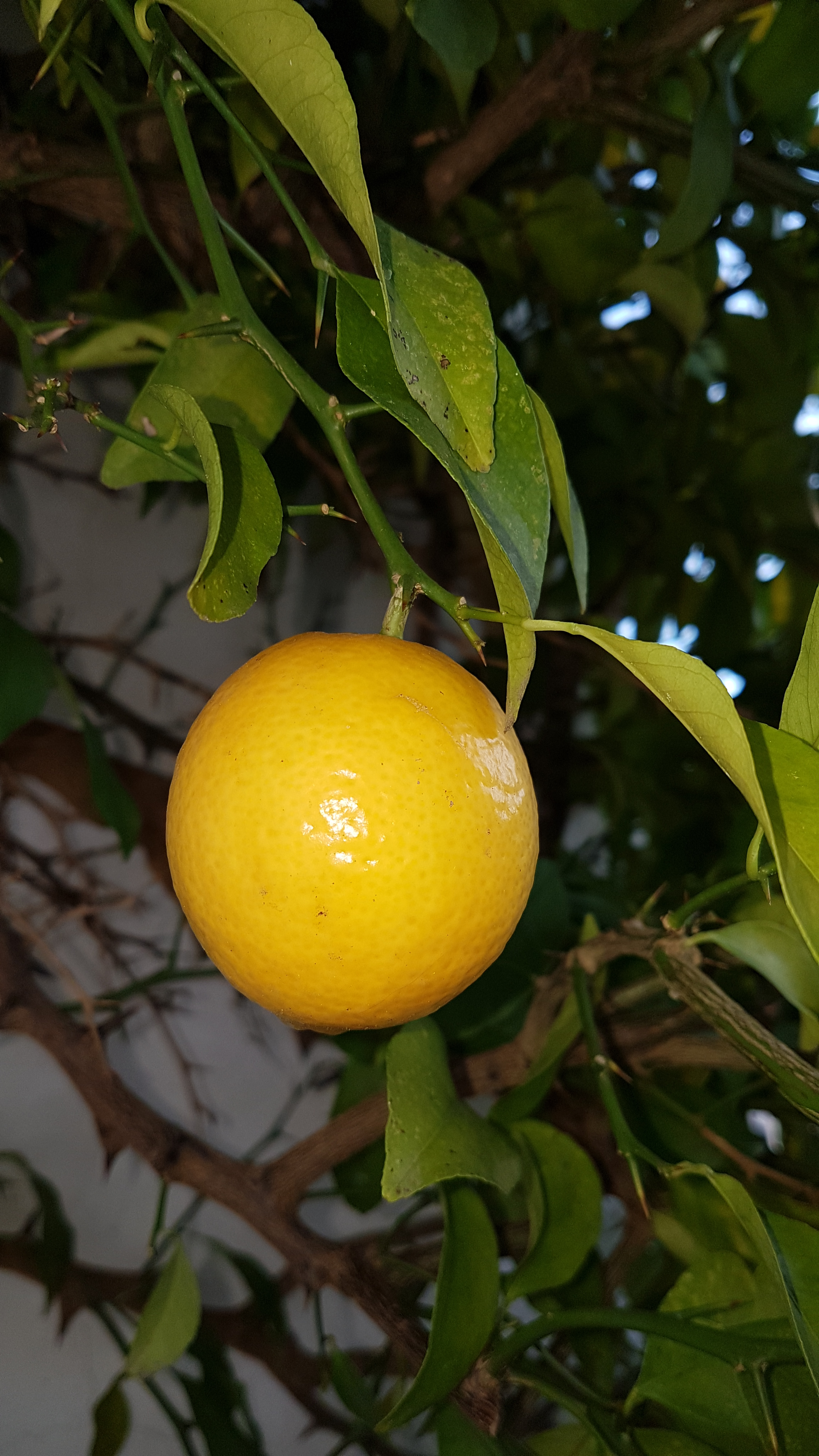
Yuko

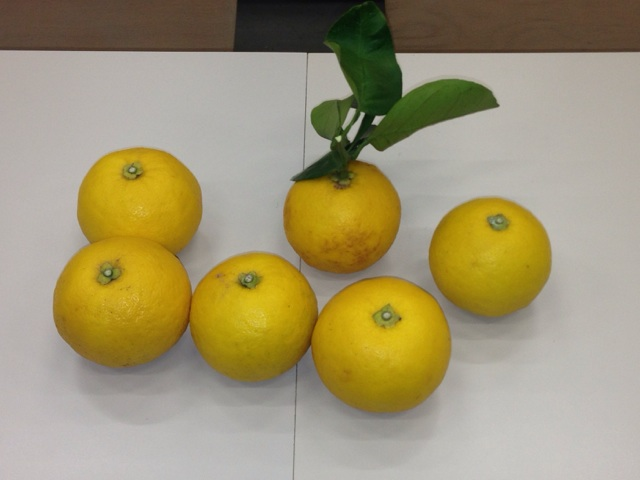
Citrus Yuko

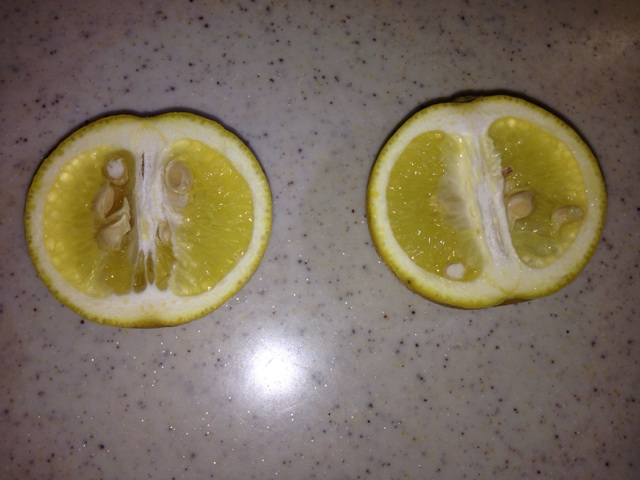
Cross section of a Yuko

== See also ==
- Citrus × depressa (Shikwasa, Hirami lemon)
- Jabara
