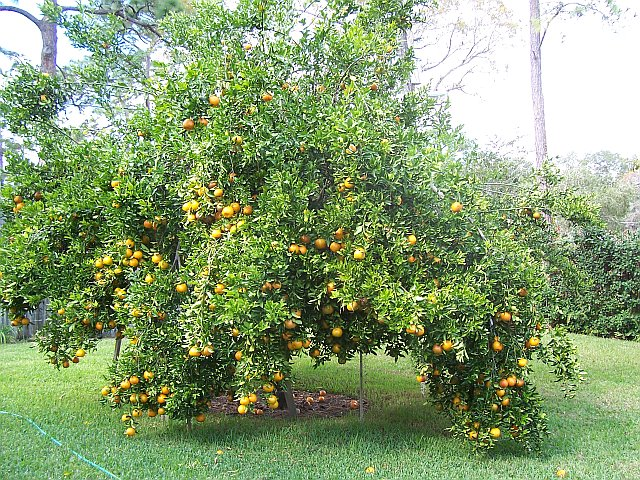
- Ponkan tree, Florida

Scientific classification
- Kingdom: Plantae
- Clade: Tracheophytes
- Clade: Angiosperms
- Clade: Eudicots
- Clade: Rosids
- Order: Sapindales
- Family: Rutaceae
- Genus: Citrus
- Species: C. poonensis

Binomial name
- Citrus poonensis hort. ex Tanaka

= Ponkan =

Citrus fruit and plant

Ponkan (Hokkien Chinese: 椪柑; Pe̍h-ōe-jī: phòng-kam); Citrus poonensis; "Chinese Honey Orange") is a high-yield sweet Citrus cultivar with large fruits in the size of an orange. It is a citrus hybrid (mandarin × pomelo), though it was once thought to be a pure mandarin.

== Description ==
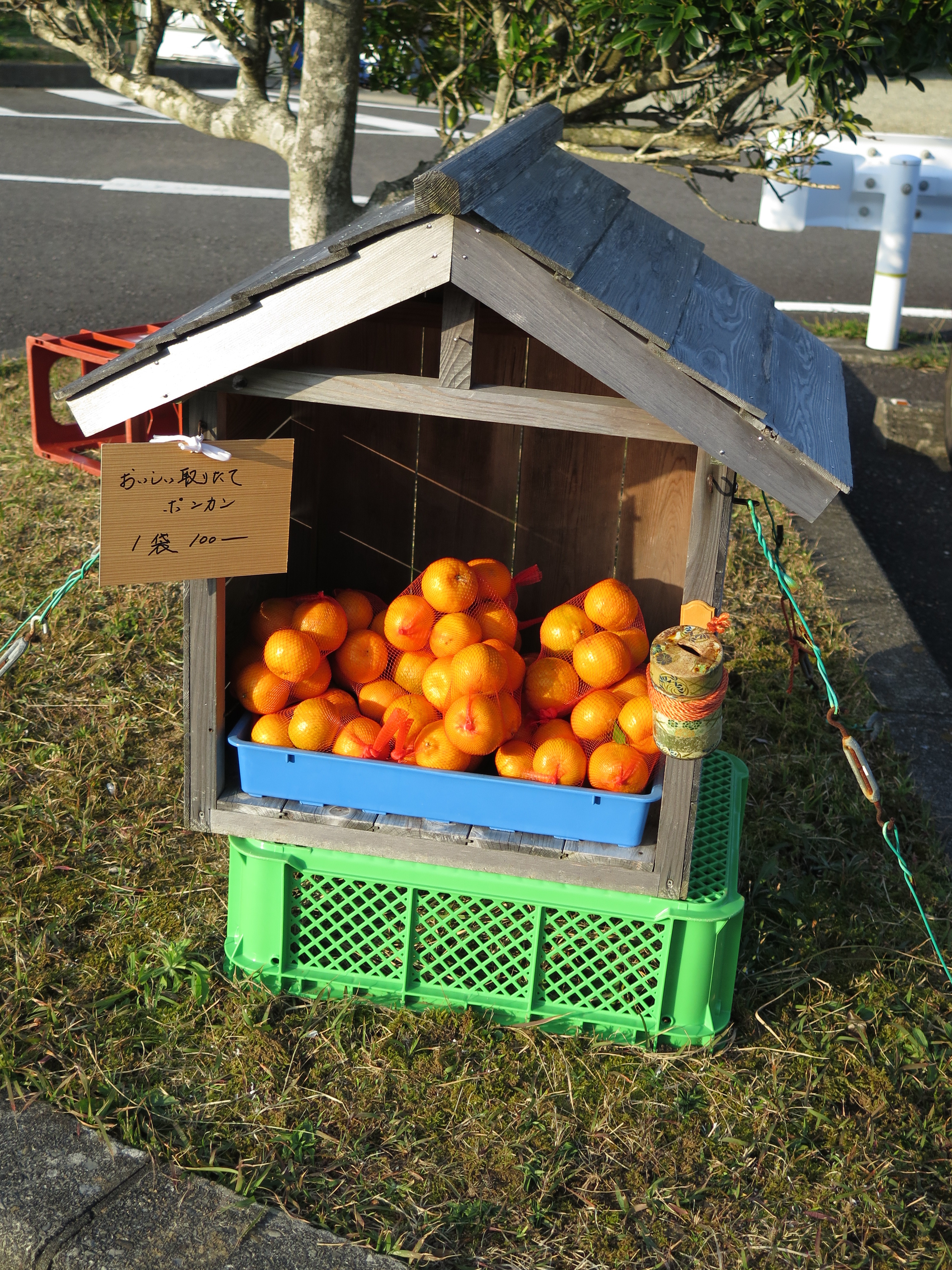
Ponkans for sale in Wakayama Prefecture, Japan

"Pon" harkens to the "Poona orange" of original stock and "kan" means citrus fruit. The fruit is very sweet, round in shape and about 7–8 cm (2.8–3.1 in) wide in size. Trees are heavy bearing every other year, and sometimes the limbs break due to the heavy yields. Growers resort to propping the limbs up with sticks at times, though if the limb bends gradually down and grows in that position it will do better in future years.

Trees can be propagated by seed, as they breed true, or grafted onto other rootstocks, trifoliate orange being the most popular. Andrew Willis of Apopka, Florida, promoted the Ponkan heavily in the early 1900s.

Ponkan is also noted for having a loose rind that is very easy to peel.

== Cultivation ==
Ponkans are widely grown in the United States, Brazil, Japan and China. In Taiwan, it is an important citrus crop often cultivated as high-end fruit and exported mainly to Hong Kong, Japan, and Canada.

It was originally introduced to the United States by Carlo Roman in 1880. His original grove is still in production near Hawthorne in Putnam County, Florida. The city of Teresópolis in Brazil holds an annual Ponkan festival.

== See also ==
- Dekopon, variety of seedless oranges produced as a hybrid between Kiyomi (Citrus unshiu × sinensis) and Ponkan
