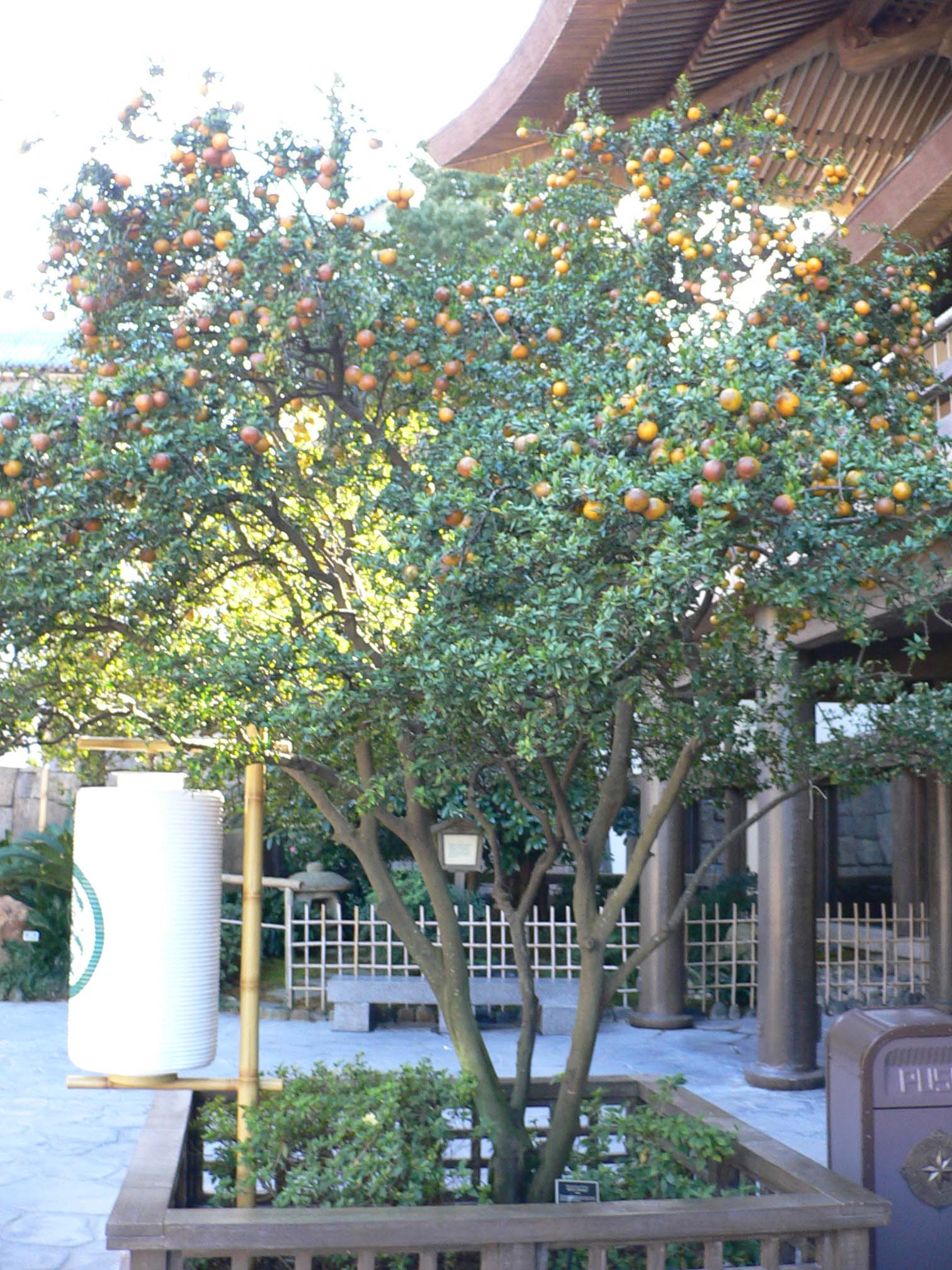

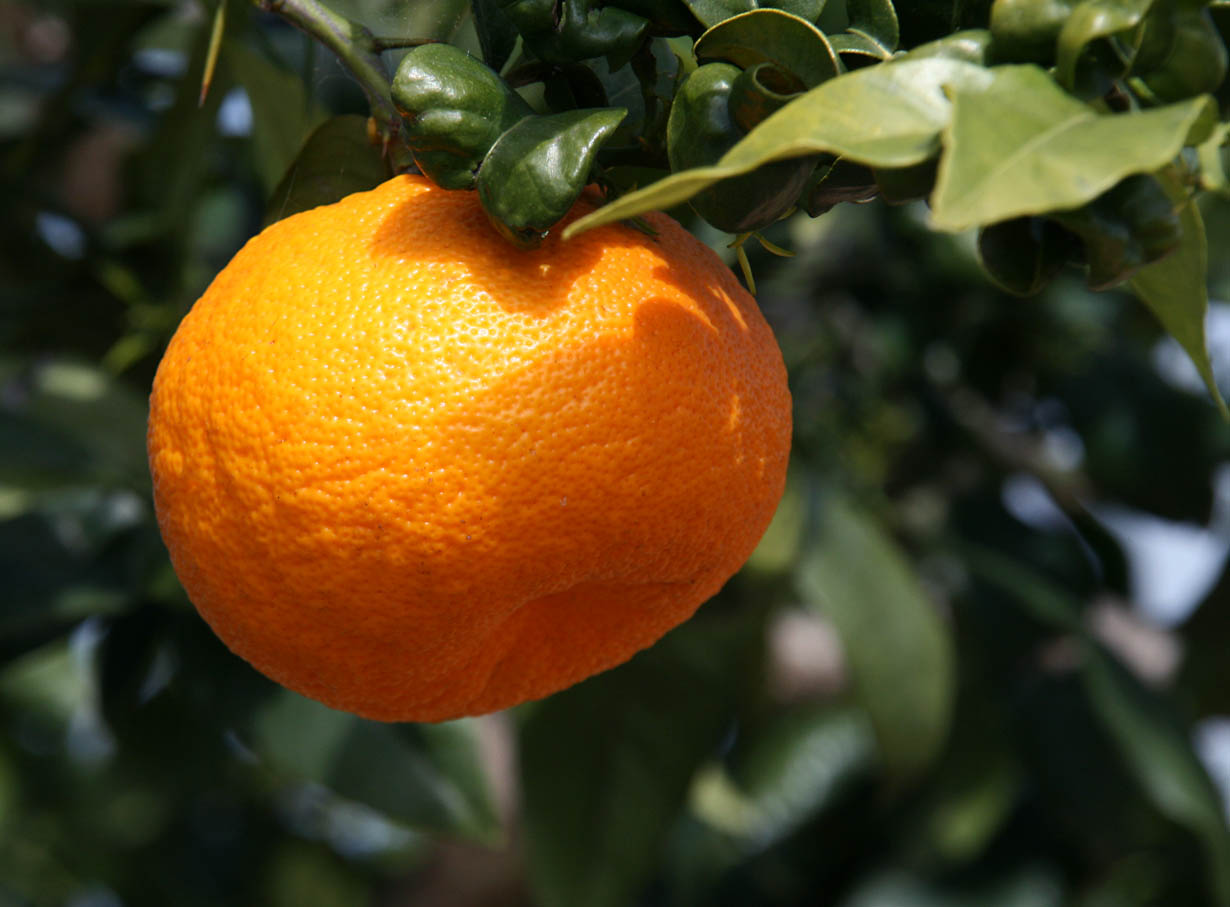

Scientific classification
- Kingdom: Plantae
- (unranked): Angiosperms
- (unranked): Eudicots
- (unranked): Rosids
- Order: Sapindales
- Family: Rutaceae
- Genus: Citrus
- Species: C. × daidai

Binomial name
- Citrus × daidai Siebold ex Hayata

= Daidai =

Variety of fruit

The daidai (Japanese: 橙; Chinese: 酸橙; Korean: 광귤; RR: gwanggyul; Citrus × daidai) is a variety of bitter orange native to Asian regions.

The daidai originated in the Himalayas. It spread to the Yangtze valley region and later to Japan. The colour of the fruit loses its yellowish hue and becomes greener in the spring. The native Japanese word for the colour orange (だいだい色, daidai-iro) is derived from the name of this fruit.

== Uses ==
There are two main cultivars, kabusu (臭橙) and kaiseitō (回青橙), and the latter bears smaller fruits than the former in Japan. The fruit is very bitter and not usually eaten, but its dried peel is used in Kampo (the Japanese adaptation of Chinese medicine). The dry peels of young fruits are called kijitsu (枳実) and are used as a stomachic, expectorant as well as a laxative. The peel of ripe daidai is called tohi (橙皮) and is used as a fragrant stomachic and expectorant.

== Cultural aspect ==
The name daidai, originally meaning "several generations" ((代々)), came from the fruit staying on the tree for several years if not picked; thus, a tree bears fruits of more than one season or from multiple years. Another background of its name refers to the shape of kaiseito's calyx, which appears to be stepped or as if the fruit is borne on two pedestals or daidai (台々). That is why people also called it za-daiidai (座橙々, 'daidai on pedestal')).

Daidai is used as a decoration in Japanese New Year celebrations, such as Shimekazari, as a symbol of the family to continue for generations, and people place a fruit on top of kagami mochi, a stack of two to three round and flat mochi. This use is believed to date from the Edo period.

It has not yet been resolved as a true species by The Plant List.
