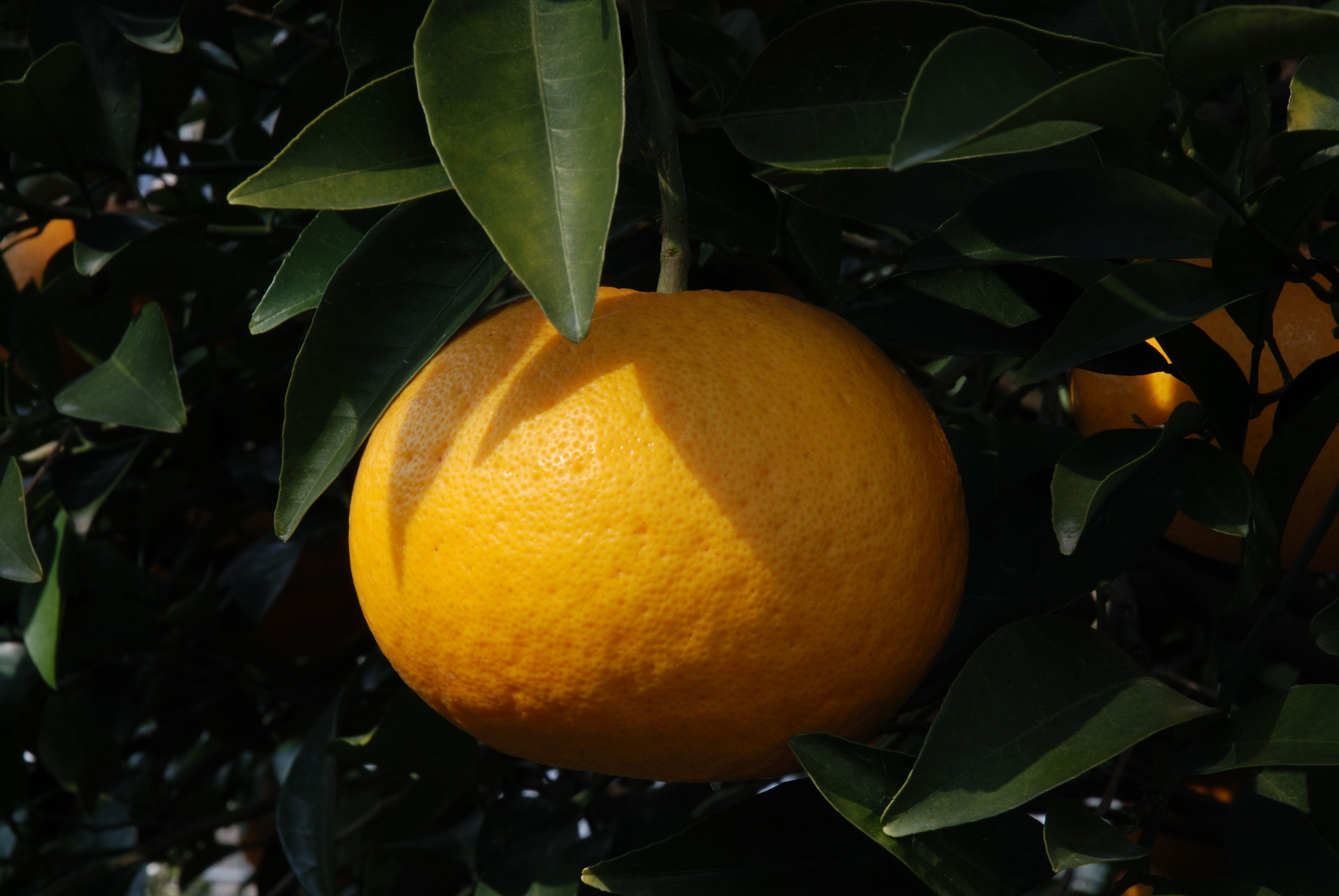

Scientific classification
- Kingdom: Plantae
- Clade: Tracheophytes
- Clade: Angiosperms
- Clade: Eudicots
- Clade: Rosids
- Order: Sapindales
- Family: Rutaceae
- Genus: Citrus
- Species: C. × natsudaidai

Binomial name
- Citrus × natsudaidai Hayata

= Amanatsu =

Amanatsu/Kawano natsu daidai

Citrus fruit and plant

Amanatsu (甘夏) or kawano natsu daidai (カワノナツダイダイ (川野夏橙)) is a yellow citrus fruit, a cultivar that originated as a mutation of the natsu mikan (ナツミカン (夏みかん)) or natsu daidai (ナツダイダイ (夏橙)). It was discovered in 1935 in Tsukumi, Oita Prefecture, Japan. The original natsu mikan that served as the basis for amanatsu was found in Yamaguchi Prefecture around 1700.

== Names ==
Amanatsu (甘夏) means "sweet summer" in Japanese. In Japan, the fruit is known as kawano natsu daidai (カワノナツダイダイ（川野夏橙）), but also colloquially the amanatsu, amanatsu daidai (甘夏橙), amanatsukan (甘夏柑), & amanatsu mikan (甘夏蜜柑（甘夏みかん）).

== Description ==
Natsumikan is about the size of grapefruit and oblate in shape. The fruit contains 12 segments and about 30 seeds. The rough textured fruit is easy to peel and is commonly eaten fresh. It is also used for wide variety of products ranging from marmalades to alcoholic beverages.

== Cultivation ==
Natsumikan is grown commercially in Japan, notably in Yamaguchi, Kumamoto and Ehime prefecture. The city of Hagi is famous for its natsumikans, particularly when used in natsumikan juice and ice cream.

Yamaguchi Prefecture takes such pride in their natsumikan industry that the typically white crash barriers of Japan were changed to a befitting orange.

== Genetics ==
The natsumikan tree is believed to be genetically derived from the pomelo (Citrus grandis or Citrus maxima).

== Medicine ==
Researchers found that immature natsumikan peel is beneficial for the treatment of chronic allergic dermatitis in mice.

== Gallery ==
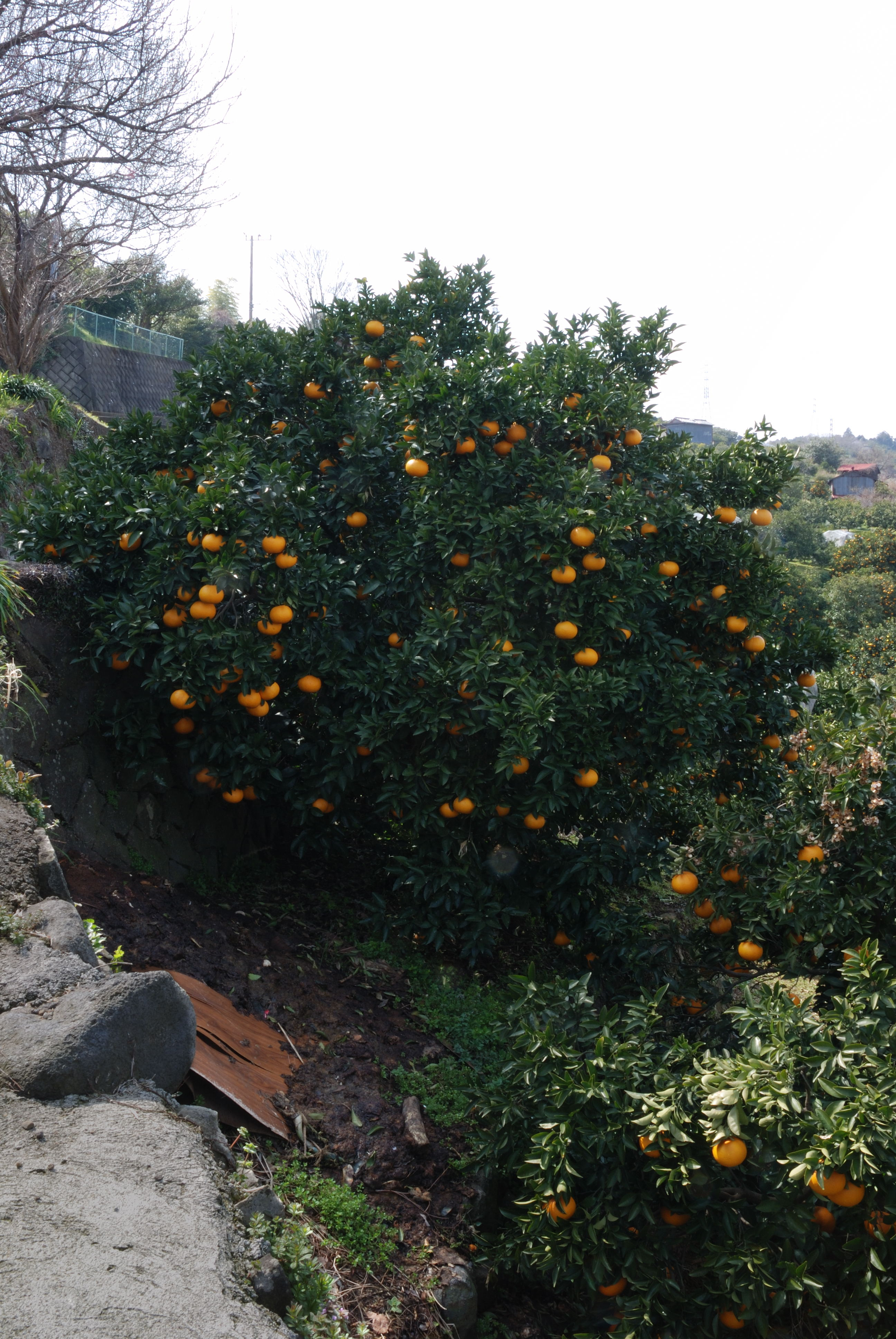
The large bearing tree.

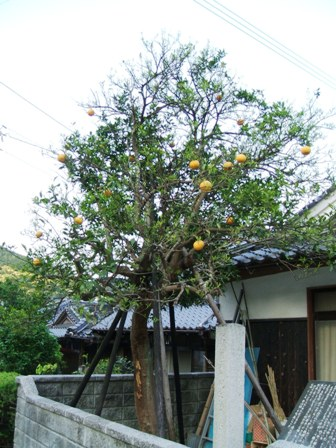
Locally at Nagato, Yamaguchi.

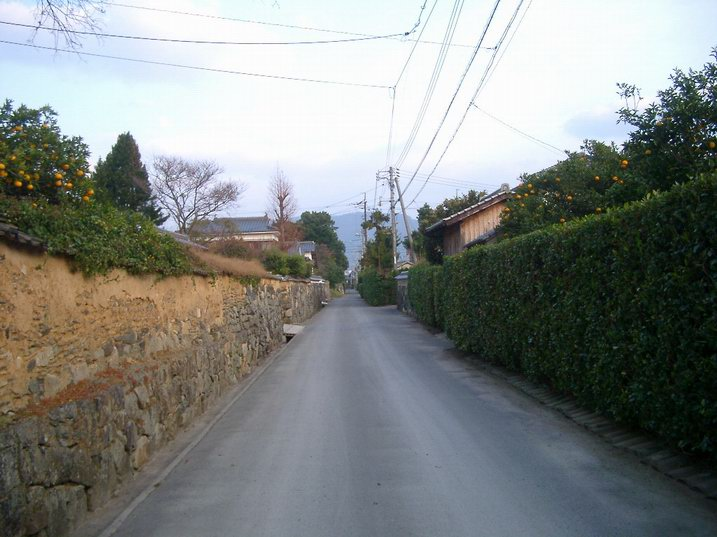
At street side in Hagi, Yamaguchi.

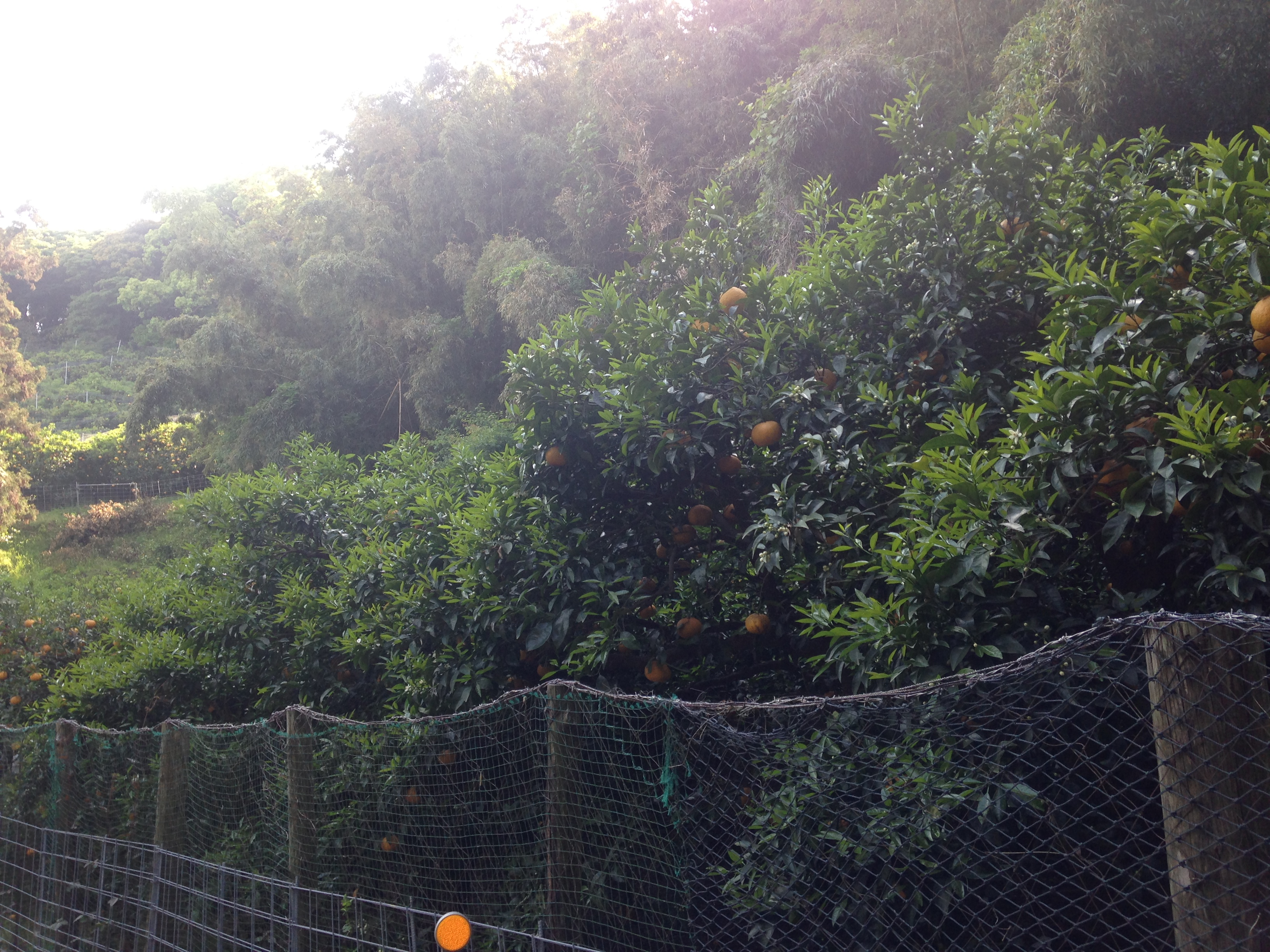
On Nokonoshima Island.

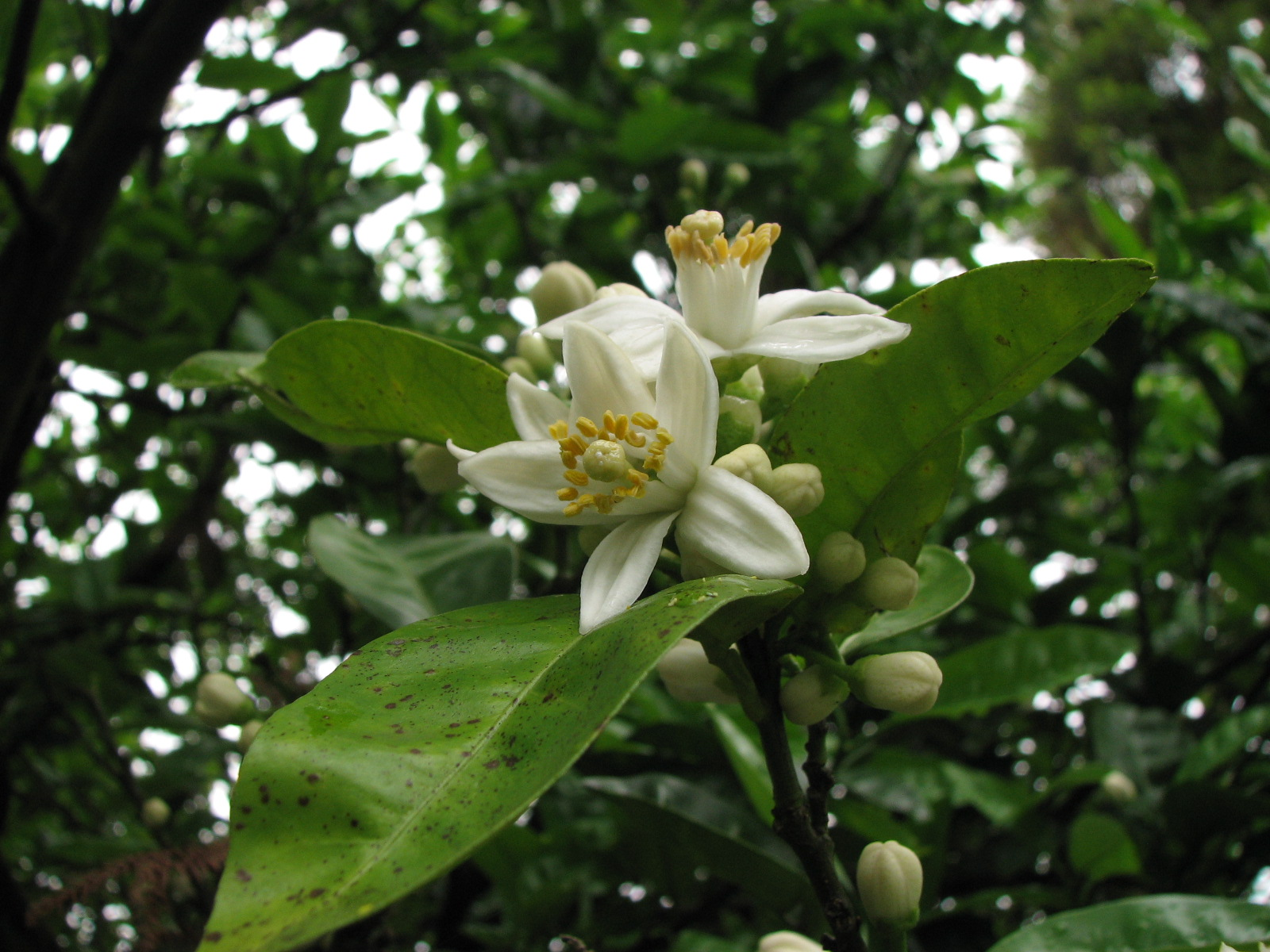
Blossoms.

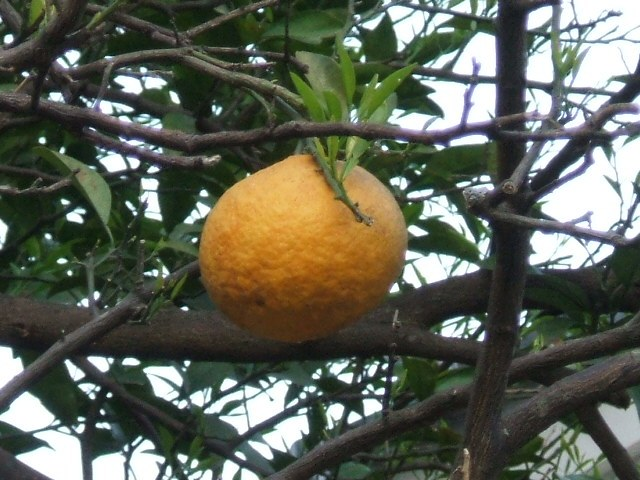
On tree.

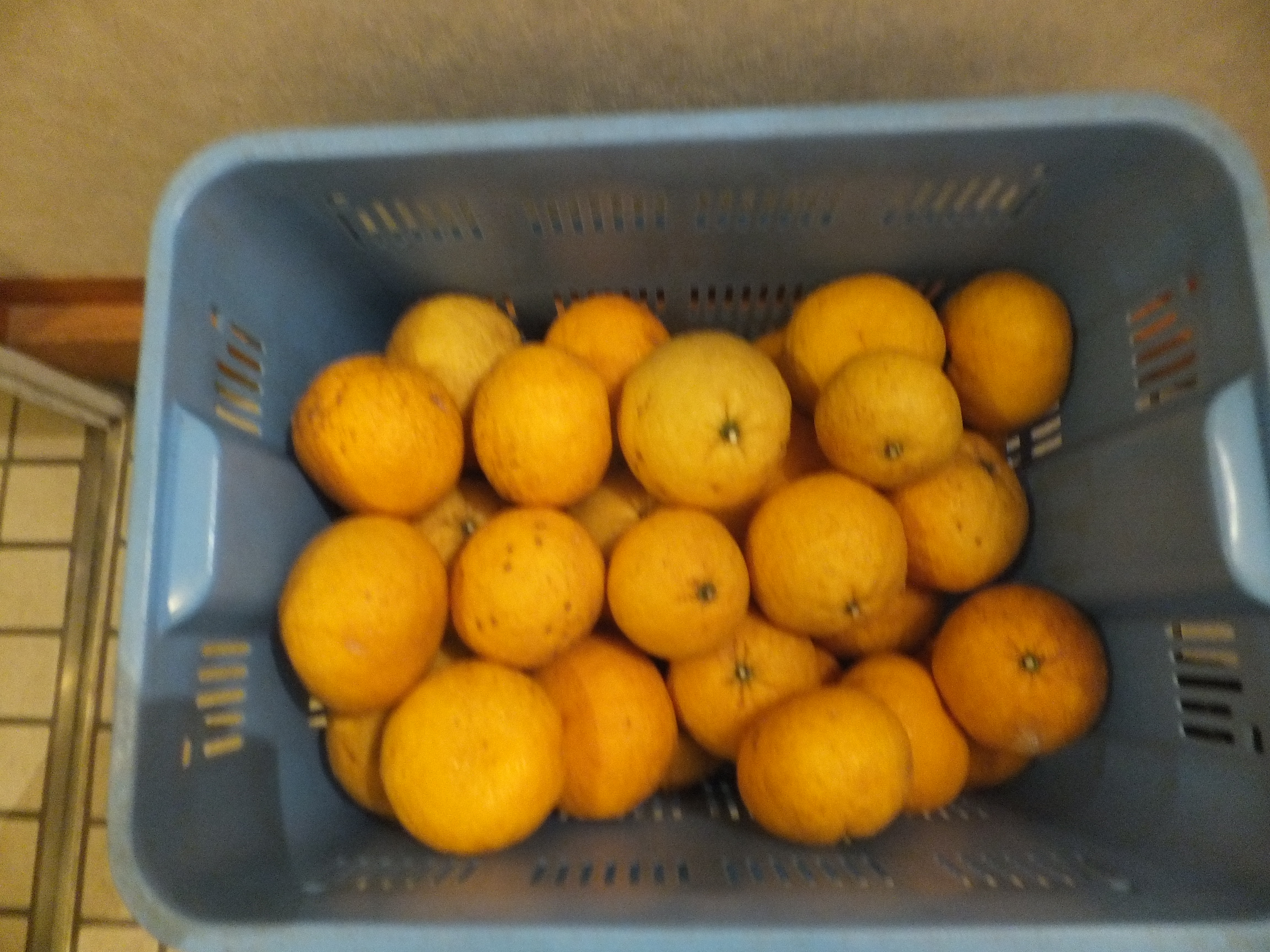
Fruit.

== See also ==
- Citrus tristeza virus
- Daidai
- Japanese citrus
- Mikan
