= Citrus blight =

Tree disease

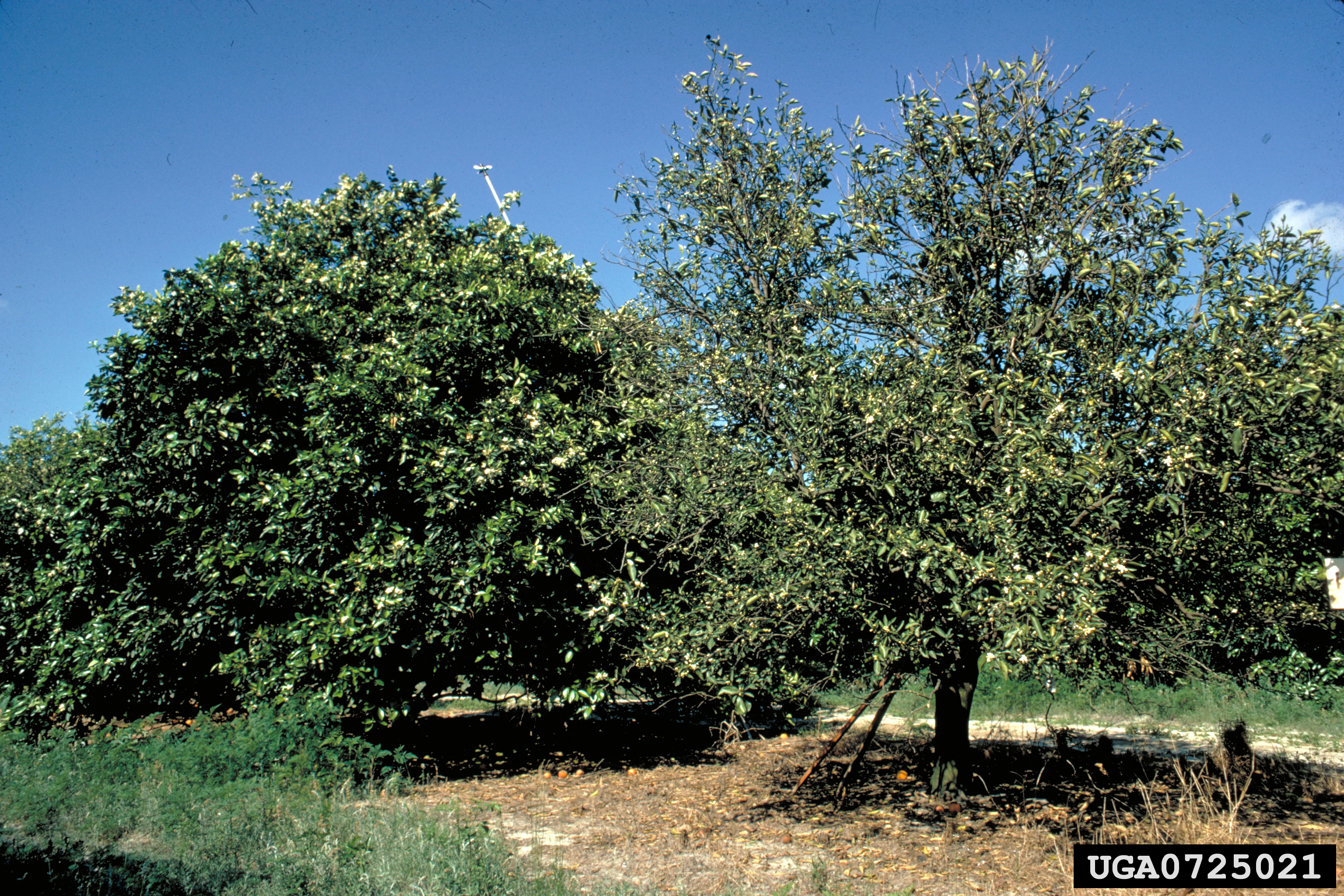
- Healthy tree (left) next to a tree infected with citrus blight (right). Note the infected tree's wilting and sparser foliage.
- Common names: Citrus blight
- Causal agents: Unknown; suspected by some sources to be an endogenous plant pararetrovirus
- Hosts: Citrus trees
- Distribution: North America, South America, South Africa, the Caribbean, and Australia

Citrus blight is a type of blight that occurs in tropical and semi-tropical regions. Specializing in infecting citrus trees, the blight is found in North America, the Caribbean, South America, South Africa and Australia. The blight injures plants by forming blockages in xylem and phloem, inhibiting resource distribution and resulting in plant die-back and smaller fruit yields. As of 2020 there is no cure for the blight, and neither the causal agent nor spreading mechanism is known.

== Description ==
Citrus blight is a type of plant blight. The effects of citrus blight were first documented in the early 20th century. The disease afflicts plants in tropical and subtropical environments; regions impacted by the disease include North America and South America, the Caribbean, South Africa, and Australia. The important citrus-growing regions of California and the Mediterranean have not been affected.

The blight spreads through an infected tree, invading and colonizing the plant's roots, leaves, and trunk. As of 2020, neither the causal agent nor the spreading mechanism of the disease is known. Research by the Citrus Research and Development Foundation posits the blight is caused by an endogenous plant pararetrovirus (EPRV).

Sources imply the blight - having infected a young tree – can go dormant for years before reemerging. Eventually the blight infests the host plant's xylem and phloem, forming plugs that inhibit the plant's ability to transport resources. While these blight-caused blockages cause the decline of an infected tree, the plant rarely dies. Co-infection between citrus blight and citrus greening disease (HLB) is possible, and is so severe a health issue that trees infected by both diseases usually die.

The disease affects trees of all ages and types, including seedlings and rootstocks. Young trees infected by citrus blight grow until the age of 5–6 before their growth is impacted. All citrus scions are susceptible to infection by the blight, though different plants display different tolerances to the disease. Plants with high tolerances include;

- Cleopatra Mandarin (Citrus reshni)
- Sour orange (Citrus × aurantium)
- Sweet orange (Citrus × sinensis)
- Swingle Citrumelo (X Citroncirus) - formerly listed as tolerant to the blight, but seeing an uptick in infected plants as of 2020.

Plants with a lower tolerance include;

- Carrizo citrange (Citrus sinensis × Poncirus trifoliata)
- Rangpur lime (Citrus reticulata × medica)
- Rough lemon (Citrus jambhiri Lush.)
- Trifoliate orange (Poncirus trifoliata)

Even plants with a higher tolerance to the blight can show symptoms after the age of 15.

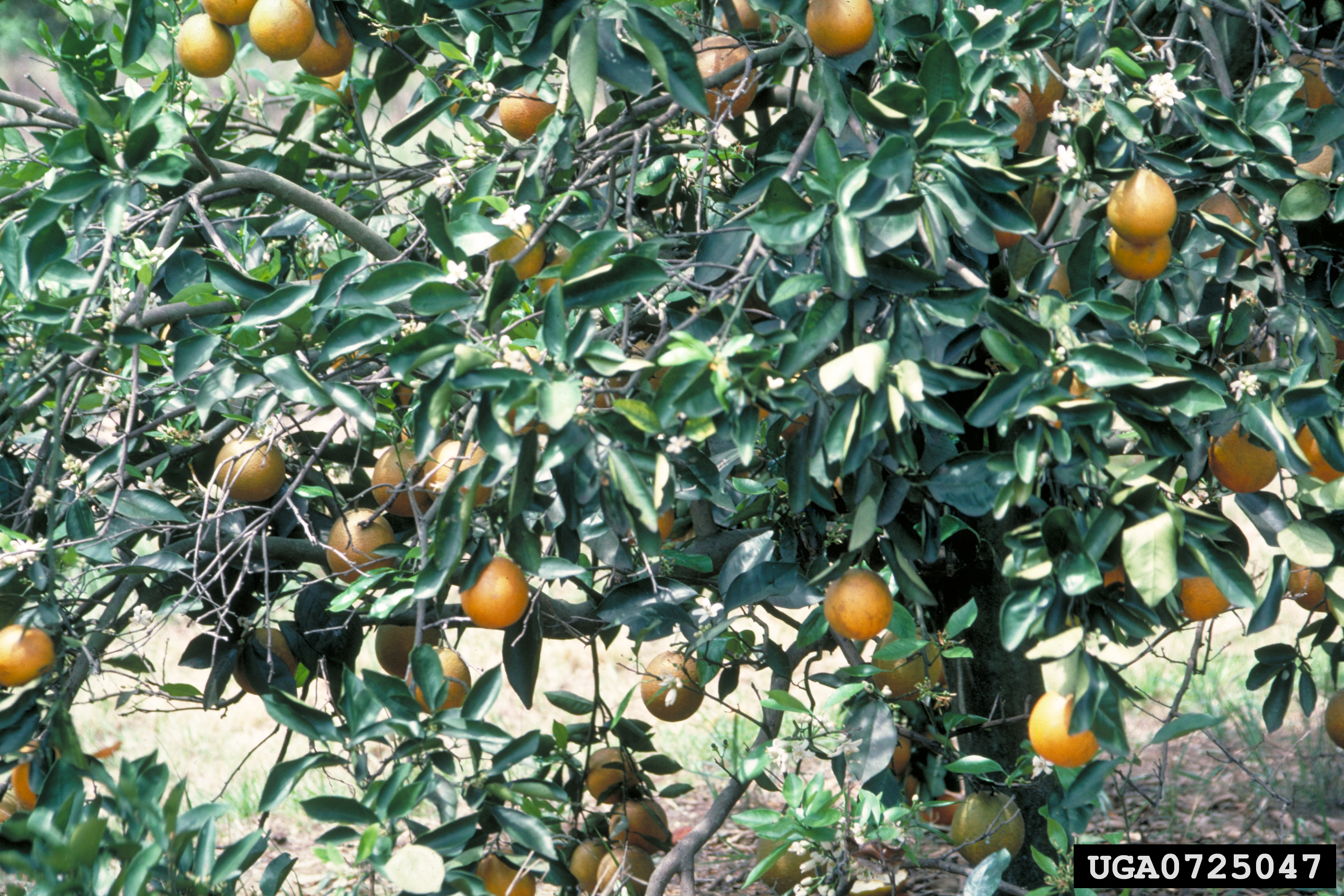
Uninfected citrus fruits (left) compared with infected fruits (right). Such size differences are the result of lower zinc levels in infected fruits, the result of the infected tree transferring additional zinc to its bark to fight the infection

=== Symptoms ===
Trees infected with citrus blight experience a general decline in health; this includes wilting, die-back, loss of foliage, and the production of smaller/discolored fruits. The infection is not uniform—individual sections of an affected plant will go into decline as opposed to a sudden, plant-wide die-off. Though the spreading mechanism of the blight is not known, some sources report trees grown on the same rootstock develop concurrent infections.

Trees infected with citrus blight can be detected by testing the level of zinc in a plant's bark (high levels of zinc indicate an infection) and by testing for anti-viral proteins – produced by the plant to fight the blight – in a plant's roots and leaves. The finding of plugs in a tree's xylem is a strong indication it is infected with citrus blight.

Another effective means of identifying citrus blight is by testing a plant's ability to take in water. While other plant diseases do not obstruct plants from taking in water, citrus blight prevents an infected plant from taking on any water regardless of the amount of pressure applied. The optimal time to test if a plant is able to take on water is in the spring months, namely March, April, and May.

=== Treatment ===
There is no cure for citrus blight. Aggressive pruning of an infected plant will temporarily halt the infection, but the measure is only temporary and the plant will eventually decline. Rates of citrus blight infection can be reduced by growing citrus-bearing trees on rootstocks that are tolerant to the disease.

=== Economic effects ===
Citrus blight reduces the size and quality of citrus crops, and as such can have a detrimental effect on the citrus industry. However, these effects can be mitigated. Trees can be planted on resistant rootstocks to ward off the effects of the blight. As the blight rarely kills trees, it is possible for an infected tree to produce years of profitable yields before the blight renders it uneconomical; for this reason, some sources recommend that citrus trees be planted on nonresistant but high-production rootstocks, the idea being that the rootstock – though susceptible to citrus blight – will allow for a citrus tree to produce enough crops to make it economical before the blight inevitably infects it. YARA, an American fertilizer company, notes that orchards treated with Calcium nitrate lose fewer trees to citrus blight, citing a 1995 study.

A field study published by the University of Florida noted that citrus blight causes $60 million in economic damages annually.

== See also ==
- Citrus greening disease
- Citrus tristeza virus
