= Citrus reticulata × medica =

Citrus reticulata × medica may refer to one of several hybrids between a mandarin orange and citron:

- Rangpur lime, Citrus limonia
- Rough lemon, Citrus jambhiri
- Volkamer lemon, Citrus volkameriana
