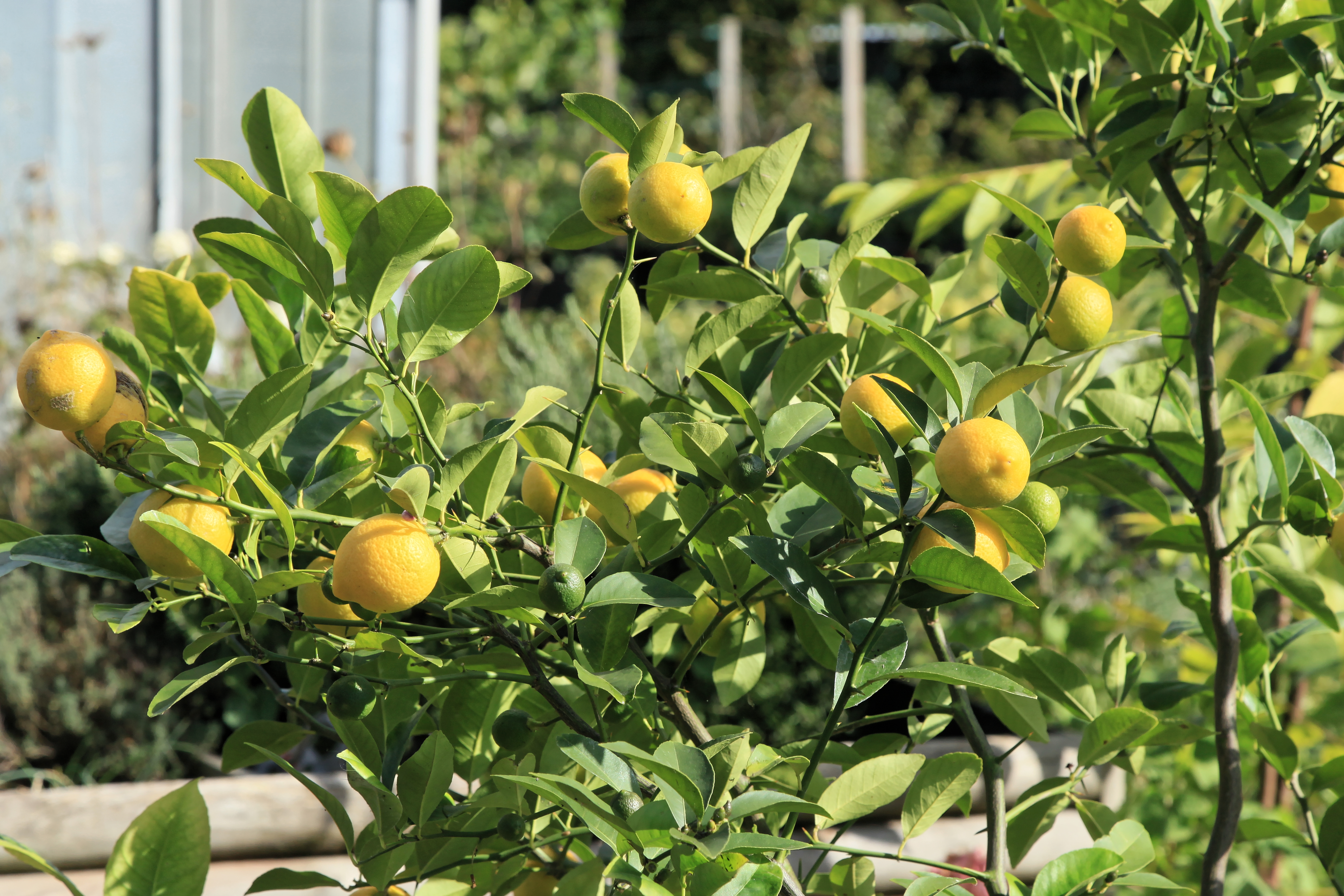
- Citrus volkameriana tree bearing unripe fruit
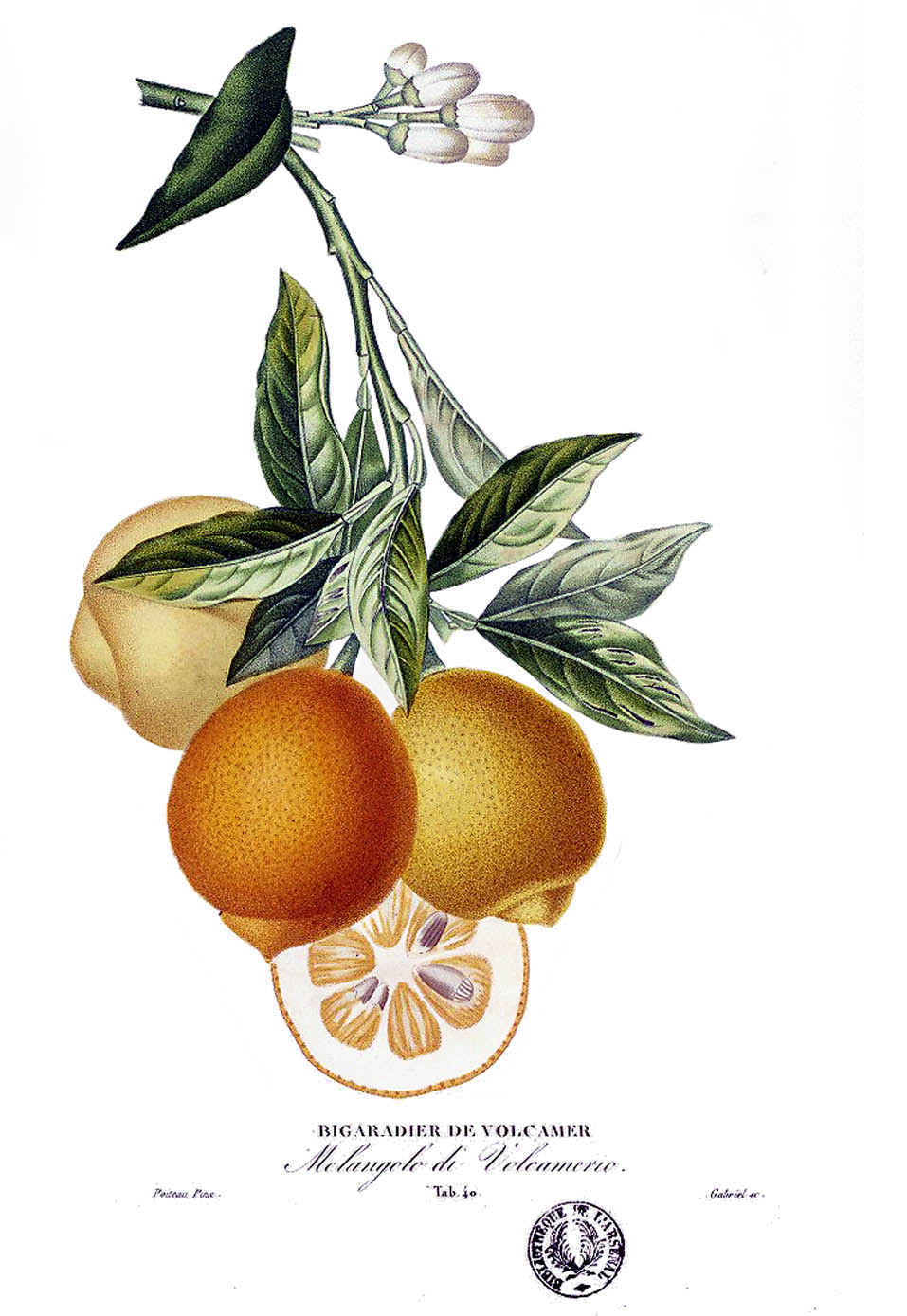
- Illustration of ripe fruit and foliage

Scientific classification
- Kingdom: Plantae
- Clade: Tracheophytes
- Clade: Angiosperms
- Clade: Eudicots
- Clade: Rosids
- Order: Sapindales
- Family: Rutaceae
- Genus: Citrus
- Species: C. volkameriana

Binomial name
- Citrus volkameriana Pasq. (1847)

Synonyms
- Citrus volckameriana; Citrus volkameriana Ten. & Pasq.; Citrus × volkameriana; Citrus limonia 'Volkameriana'; Citrus reticulata × medica

= Volkamer lemon =

Species of plant

Volkamer lemon (Citrus volkameriana), often misspelled Volckamer lemon, is a Citrus hybrid cultivated for its edible fruit. The specific epithet (volkameriana) honors German botanist Johann Christoph Volkamer. It is a taxonomical synonym of Citrus limon.

It is known as 沃 尔卡默柠檬 (wo er ka mo ning meng) in Chinese, citron de Volkamer in French, limone Volkameriano in Italian, and chanh Volkamer in Vietnamese.

== Distribution ==
It likely originated in Italy and is most widely grown in the United States and Europe, and to a smaller extent in eastern Asia.

== Description ==
Like the Rangpur lime and rough lemon, it is a hybrid of a mandarin orange (Citrus reticulata) and a citron (Citrus medica), with the citron being the pollen parent and the mandarin being the seed parent. The fruit is moderately large (around the size of an orange), seedy, round and slightly elongated, and yellow-orange in color. The flavor is said to be pleasant, although acidic and slightly bitter, with a pleasant fragrance. It ripens from winter to early spring. The tree is densely branched and high-yielding, often weighed down because of the fruits. The leaves are elliptical in shape and the flowers have five white petals. It is hardy to USDA zone 9. The tree is fast-growing and adaptable to many soil conditions. It is not susceptible to tristeza virus, exocortis, or xyloporosis viroids, but is susceptible to citrus nematode and phytophthora root rot but less so than the rough lemon.

== Uses ==
It has been cultivated for three centuries and is used as a rootstock for other Citrus cultivars because of its resistance to many diseases that affect members of the genus Citrus.

== See also ==
- List of citrus fruits
