= Citrus rootstock =

Plants used as rootstock for citrus plants

Citrus rootstock are plants used as rootstock for citrus plants. A rootstock plant must be compatible for scion grafting, and resistant to common threats, such as drought, frost, and common citrus diseases.

== Principal rootstocks ==
Five types of rootstock predominate in temperate climates where cold or freezing weather is not probable, especially Florida and southern Europe:

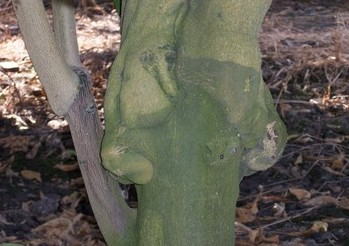
A double graft union of diamante citron upon sour orange rootstock.

- Sour orange: the only rootstock that truly is an orange (the Citrus × aurantium or bitter orange). It is vigorous and highly drought-resistant.
- Poncirus trifoliata: a close relative of the genus Citrus, sometimes classified as Citrus trifoliata. It is especially resistant to cold, the tristeza virus, and the oomycete Phytophthora parasitica (root rot), and grows well in loam soil. Among its disadvantages are its slow growth—it is the slowest growing rootstock—and its poor resistance to heat and drought. It is primarily used in China, Japan, and areas of California with heavy soils.
- Swingle citrumelo: tolerant of tristeza virus and Phytophthora parasitica and moderately resistant to salt and freezing. This rootstock selection was hybridized from the Duncan grapefruit (Citrus paradisi Macfadyen) and the Poncirus trifoliata (L.) Raf. by Walter Tennyson Swingle in Eustis, Florida, in 1907. It was released by the US Department of Agriculture to nurserymen in 1974.
- Troyer citrange and Carrizo citrange: reasonably vigorous rootstocks, resistant to Phytophthora parasitica, nematodes, and tristeza virus and with good cold tolerance. They also are highly polyembryonic, so growers can obtain multiple plants from a single seed. Citrange, however, does not do well in clay, calcareous or high-pH soils, and is sensitive to salinity. It is not feasible as rootstock for mandarin scions, as it overgrows them by producing branches of its own in competition with the grafted budwood. Citranges are hybrids of the Washington navel orange and the Poncirus trifoliata. The original crosses, made in the early 1900s by the U.S. Department of Agriculture with the intention of producing cold tolerant scion varieties, were later identified as suitable for use as rootstocks. The commercial use of these rootstocks began in Australia in the 1960s. The Troyer variety generally is found in California, while the Carrizo variety is used in Florida.
- Cleopatra mandarin: tolerant of salinity and soil alkalinity and also suitable for shallow soils. It is used primarily in Spain, Australia, and Florida. Dade County, for example, has 85% calcareous soil, a typical trait of land that has been under water. The Cleopatra mandarin, originated in India and introduced into Florida from Jamaica in the mid-nineteenth century, has been distributed and tested as a rootstock throughout the world. Nowadays, however, it is considered an inferior rootstock because it is sensitive to many diseases, grows slowly, and is difficult to propagate.

== Other rootstock cultivars ==
- African shaddock X trifoliate hybrid
- Benton citrange trifoliate hybrid
- Borneo Rangpur lime
- Bitters C-22 citrange (X Citroncirus sp. Rutaceae): it was hybridized at the USDA Date and Citrus Station in Indio, California, and developed further by the University of California, Riverside. It is used primarily as rootstock for navel oranges in California. In 2009, a report suggested it also may be useful to replace sour orange rootstock for grapefruit in Texas because it is tolerant of calcareous soil. Its name is not related to the bitter orange: it was named after Willard Paul Bitters, emeritus professor of Horticulture and a curator of the Citrus Variety Collection.
- Carpenter C-54 citrange
- C-32 citrange trifoliate hybrid
- C-35 citrange trifoliate hybrid
- Calamondin kumquat hybrid
- Carrizo citrange trifoliate hybrid
- Citradia trifoliate hybrid
- Citremon trifoliate hybrid (CRC 1449)
- Citrumelo trifoliate hybrid C190
- Citrumelo trifoliate hybrid (CRC 1452)
- Citrumelo trifoliate hybrid (CRC 4475)
- Citrus macrophylla (Alemow)
- Citrus volkameriana (Volkamer lemon)
- Cleopatra mandarin X trifoliate hybrid X639
- Flying dragon trifoliate (CRC 3330A)
- Fraser Seville sour orange
- Furr C-57 citrange
- Goutoucheng sour orange (CRC 3929)
- Goutoucheng sour orange (CRC 4004)
- Grapefruit seedling (CRC 343)
- Pomeroy trifoliate
- Rangpur lime X Troyer citrange hybrid
- Rich 16-6 trifoliate
- Rubidoux trifoliate
- Rusk citrange trifoliate orange hybrid
- Satsuma X trifoliate hybrid
- Schaub rough lemon
- Small-leaf trifoliate
- Smooth Flat Seville sour orange
- Sun Chu Sha Kat mandarin
- US 119 (Grapefruit X trifoliate) X Sweet Orange hybrid
- Vangassay rough lemon
- Yuma Ponderosa lemon pummelo hybrid
- Zhuluan sour orange hybrid (CRC 3930)
- Zhuluan sour orange hybrid (CRC 3981)

== See also ==
- Citrus hybrid
- List of citrus diseases
