= Chinese orange =

Chinese orange may refer to:

- Citrus medica, fragrant citrus fruit
- Poncirus trifoliata, member of the family Rutaceae, closely related to Citrus
- Mandarin orange, small citrus tree with fruit resembling other oranges
