= Citrumelo =

Taxon

- Hybrid parentage: Poncirus trifoliata (Japanese bitter orange) x Citrus × paradisi (grapefruit)

Citrumelo (× Citroncirus spp.) is also called Swingle citrumelo trifoliate hybrid, because it is cold hardy and is a hybrid between a 'Duncan' grapefruit and a trifoliate orange (Poncirus trifoliata (L.) Raf.), developed by Walter Tennyson Swingle.

Citrumelo is widely employed as a citrus rootstock, being resistant to the severe citrus tristeza virus and to phytophthora root rot as well as to blight, cold, and citrus nematode. The trees can survive temperatures into the teens (Fahrenheit); one specimen in North Carolina reportedly survived temperatures below zero Fahrenheit.

The fruit are yellow, and up to 4 inches across in size. Their taste is described as "like a cross between a lemon and a grapefruit", or "if sprinkled with sugar [then] like an ordinary grapefruit, harvested perhaps a bit too early".

== Taxonomy ==
Trifoliate orange, according to Swingle, belongs to a citrus-related genus called Poncirus, while grapefruit equivocally belongs to the genus citrus, hence the botanical name × citroncirus is a hybrid genus, derived from citrus and poncirus.
