= Cold-hardy citrus =

Term describing citrus with increased frost tolerance

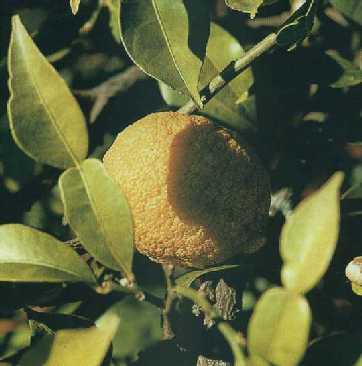
Ichang papeda, a citrus variety known for its cold tolerance

Cold-hardy citrus is citrus with increased frost tolerance and which may be cultivated far beyond traditional citrus growing regions. Citrus species and citrus hybrids typically described as cold-hardy generally display an ability to withstand wintertime temperatures below −5 to −10 °C (23 to 14 °F). Cold-hardy citrus may be generally accepted 'true' species (e.g. Satsuma mandarin, kumquat) or hybrids (e.g. citrange) involving various other citrus species. All citrus fruits are technically edible, though some have bitter flavors often regarded as unpleasant, and this variability is also seen in cold-hardy citrus fruits. Those listed as "inedible fresh" or "semi-edible" can (like all citrus) be cooked to make marmalade.

== Varieties ==
Varieties of true citrus considered cold-hardy, ordered from most to least hardy:

Name	Binomial	Hardiness	Edibility	Notes
Trifoliate orange	Citrus trifoliata	−30 °C (−22 °F)	Inedible fresh	Used as rootstock and will freely hybridize with other citrus
Ichang papeda	Citrus cavaleriei	−18 °C (0 °F)	Inedible fresh	Parent to a number of hybrids, including the yuzu, sudachi, ichang lemon/shangjuan, and others
Jiouyuezao mandarin	Citrus reticulata 'Jiouyuezao'	−13 °C (9 °F)	Edible	Long cultivated in China
Changsha mandarin	Citrus reticulata 'Changsha'	−11 °C (12 °F)	Edible but seedy	Long cultivated in China
Kumquat	Citrus japonica	−10 °C (14 °F)	Edible	Fruit eaten whole with a sweet skin and sour pulp
Desert lime	Citrus glauca	−10 °C (14 °F)	Edible, Used in cooking.	Fruit eaten whole
Satsuma	Citrus reticulata 'Unshiu', syn. Citrus unshiu	short-term −6 °C (21 °F)	Edible; excellent	Long cultivated in China

=== Interspecific hybrids ===
Interspecific hybrid varieties considered cold-hardy, ordered from most to least hardy:

Name	Binomial	Hardiness	Edibility	Notes
Citrandarin	Citrus reticulata × Citrus trifoliata e.g. Cultivar US852	−18 °C (0 °F)	Edible	'Changsha' citrandarin is the hardiest citrus hybrid
Citrange	Citrus × sinensis × Citrus trifoliata	−18 °C (0 °F)	Semi-edible	'Rusk' is considered the most edible citrange
Citrangequat	Citrus japonica × Citrange	−15 °C (5 °F)	Edible	'Thomasville' is considered the most edible citrangequat
Citrumelo	Citrus × paradisi × Citrus trifoliata	−15 °C (5 °F)	Semi-edible	'Dunstan' is considered the most edible citrumelo
Kabosu	Citrus cavaleriei × Citrus x aurantium	−12 °C (10 °F)	Edible, Used in cooking	Long cultivated in Japan
Shuangjuan (Ichang lemon)	Citrus cavaleriei × Citrus maxima	−12 °C (10 °F)	Edible, Used in cooking	Long cultivated in China
Yuzu	Citrus cavaleriei × Citrus reticulata	−12 °C (10 °F)	Edible, Used in cooking	Originally cultivated in China; spread to Japan, where many cultivars have been developed
Sudachi	Citrus x junos × Citrus leiocarpa	−12 °C (10 °F)	Edible, Used in cooking	Long cultivated in Japan
Orangequat	Citrus sinensis × Citrus japonica	−9 °C (16 °F)	Edible	'Nippon' is favored for edibility and hardiness
Rangpur lime	Citrus medica × Citrus reticulata	−9 °C (16 °F)	Edible, Used in cooking	Long cultivated in South Asia
Calamondin	Citrus reticulata × Citrus japonica	−8 °C (18 °F)	Edible, Used in cooking	Long cultivated in the Philippines
Chinotto	Citrus x aurantium var. 'myrtifolia'	−8 °C (18 °F)	Edible. Used in cooking, too bitter to eat raw	Long cultivated in Southern Italy, Malta and Libya

== See also ==
- Citrus rootstock
