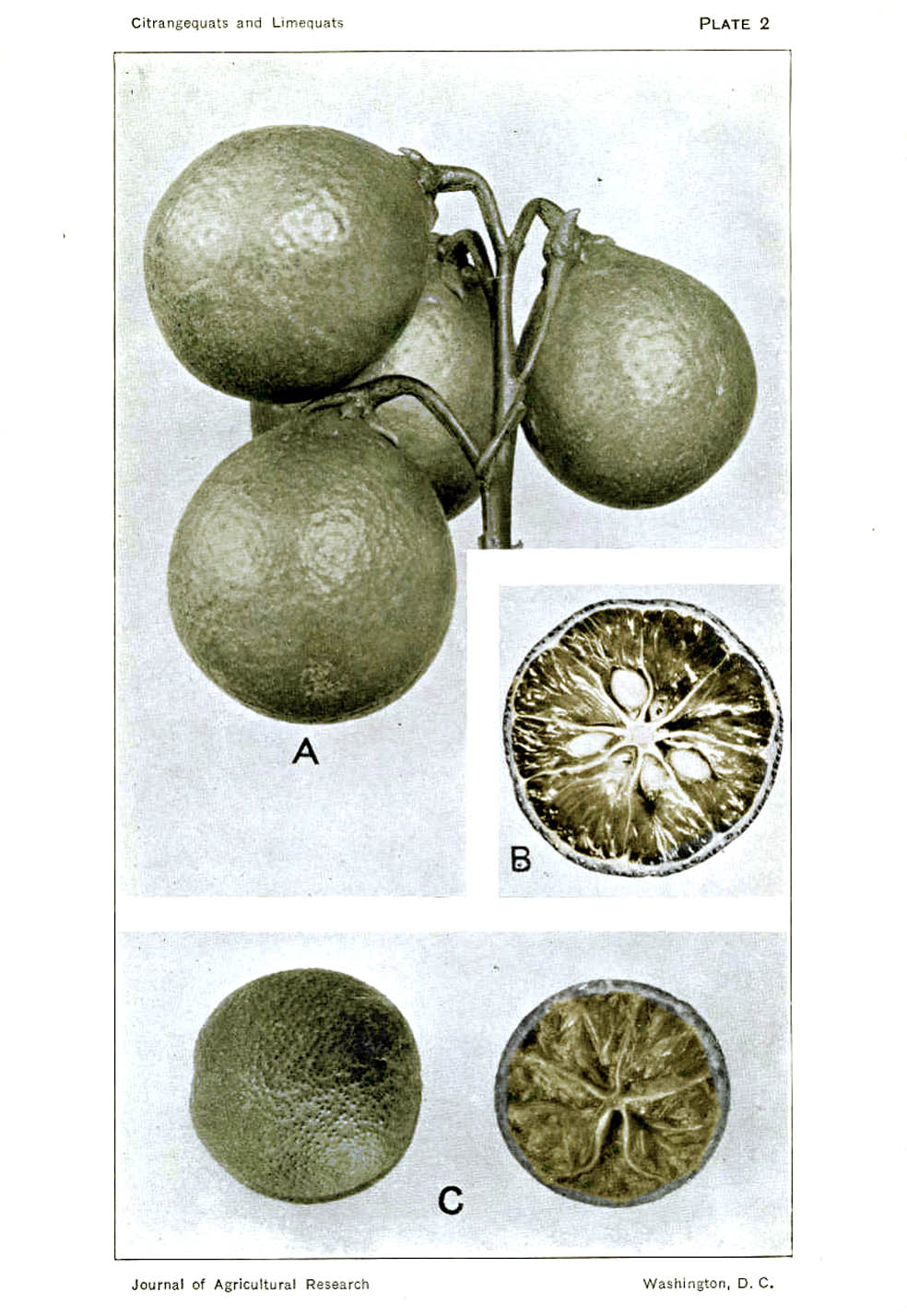
- Citrangequat Thomasville (A and B ) - Citrangequat Telfair (C)

Scientific classification
- Kingdom: Plantae
- Clade: Tracheophytes
- Clade: Angiosperms
- Clade: Eudicots
- Clade: Rosids
- Order: Sapindales
- Family: Rutaceae
- Genus: Citrus
- Species: C. × georgiana

Binomial name
- Citrus × georgiana Mabb.

= Citrangequat =

Citrus fruit and plant

The citrangequat (Citrus × georgiana) is a citrus hybrid of a citrange and a kumquat, developed by Walter Swingle at Eustis, Florida, in 1909. Citrangequats are bitter in taste, but are considered edible by some at the peak of their maturity. Three named cultivars exist:

- 'Sinton' – Nagami kumquat (Fortunella margarita) x Rusk citrange; named for the city of Sinton, Texas
- 'Telfair' – Nagami kumquat x Willits citrange; named for Telfair County, Georgia
- 'Thomasville' – most common citrangequat; named for the city of Thomasville, Georgia. 'Thomasville' is considered the most cold-hardy edible citrus variety. It can tolerate temperatures down to −15 °C (5 °F).
