= Tanqueray =

Brand of London dry gin

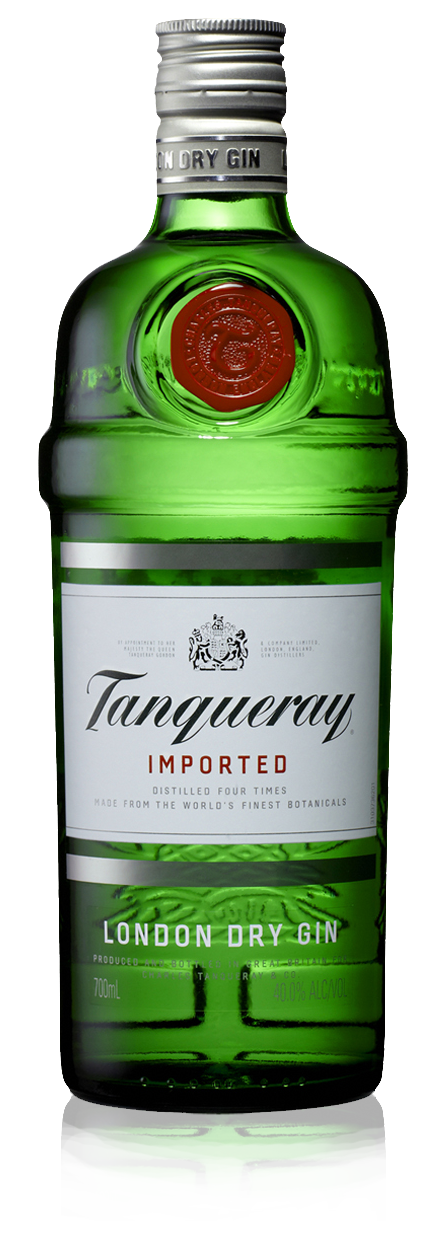
- Tanqueray London Dry Gin
- Type: Gin; Vodka (Tanqueray Sterling Vodka)
- Manufacturer: Diageo
- Origin: England
- Introduced: 1830
- Alcohol by volume: 47.3%, 43.1%, 41.3%, 40%, 0.0%
- Related products: Tanqueray Sterling Vodka
- Website: tanqueray.com

Tanqueray is a brand of gin produced by Diageo plc. It is a London dry gin, reflecting its distillation process and origin in Bloomsbury, London. Tanqueray London dry gin is made by four time distilled grain, with select botanicals added during the second distillation. While the Tanqueray recipe is a closely guarded trade secret, it is known to contain four botanicals: juniper, coriander, angelica root and liquorice, the same four botanicals from the original recipe.

It is one of Diageo's key "strategic brands" earmarked for prioritisation in promotion and distribution worldwide.

== History ==
Tanqueray gin was initially distilled in 1830 by Charles Tanqueray in Bloomsbury. The retail outlet of Edward & Charles Tanqueray & Co was established on Vine Street, London, in 1838. When Charles died in 1868, his son Charles Waugh Tanqueray inherited the distillery, which continued to operate until it was severely damaged during World War II. The only building to survive the Axis bombing, now known as "Old Tom", has since been moved to the Cameronbridge distillery in Fife, Scotland.

In accordance with a report by The Spirits Business, Tanqueray was the highest selling gin in the world for 2016, with nearly three million nine-litre cases sold.

== Products ==
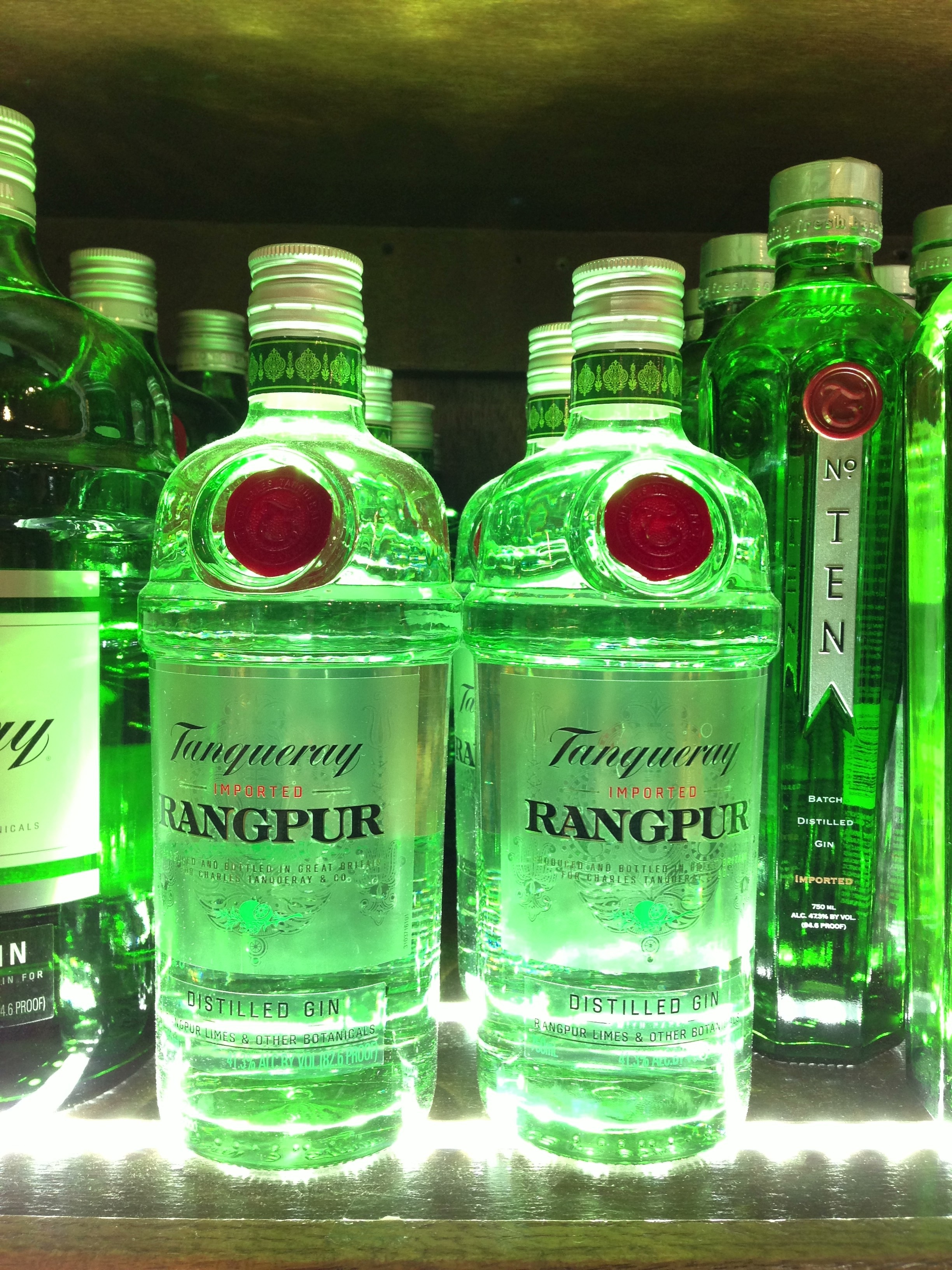
Tanqueray London Dry, Rangpur, and No. Ten

Tanqueray London Dry Gin is the original product that was launched in 1830; its key botanicals are juniper, coriander, angelica root and liquorice. It is variously sold as:

- IMPORTED 47.3% ABV (United States, Canada, Germany and European duty-free shops)
- Export Strength 43.1% ABV (Norway and Sweden)
- 40% ABV (Australia, Canada, and New Zealand)

The United Kingdom had the Export Strength version until 2023, after which it was lowered to 41.3% to avoid increased alcohol duties. The phrase "Export Strength" no longer appears on these bottles.

Tanqueray No. Ten Gin (47.3%) was introduced in 2000 and is targeted at the martini market. It is distilled four times with whole grapefruit, orange, lime and chamomile flowers.

Tanqueray Sterling Vodka debuted in 1989, available in both neutral and citrus flavours with most sales in the U.S.

Tanqueray Rangpur Gin was introduced in Maryland, Delaware, and Washington, D.C. in the summer of 2006. It has a strong citrus flavour, the result of Rangpur limes, ginger, and bay leaves added during the final distillation process. It is produced at 82.6 proof (41.3% abv) and is now available throughout the United States and Canada. It is named after the city of Rangpur in Bangladesh from where the name of the citrus also came.

Tanqueray Malacca Gin was introduced in 1997 as a "wetter" alternative to the London Dry, with more sweetness and a stronger fruit palate (most notably grapefruit). Discontinued in 2001, Diageo announced on 12 December 2012 that a 16,000-case limited edition of Tanqueray Malacca would be relaunched in the US, Great Britain, Canada and Western Europe for February 2013.

Tanqueray Blackcurrant Royale Gin was introduced in 2021. It has a rich fruity flavour with taste of French blackcurrant, vanilla and exotic floral notes.

In 2021, Tanqueray launched a non-alcoholic variety of the original called Tanqueray 0.0, bottled at 0.0% ABV.

Past offerings from Tanqueray also include both orange and lemon gins, produced from 1937 until 1957, when both were phased out.

Notable spirits ratings for Tanqueray included a string of Double Golds (for its basic London Dry) for 2005–2007 from the San Francisco World Spirits Competition. Later years' competitions saw Tanqueray win a string of silver medals and then another double gold in 2012. Wine Enthusiast rated the London Dry in its "96–100" category in 2007 but gave it a "90–95" in 2011.

== Advertising ==
Tanqueray introduced "Mr. Jenkins", a white-haired, well-dressed spokes-character, in print ads in 1994. He was retired a few years later. In 2004 Tanqueray introduced "Tony Sinclair", a younger, foppish hipster socialite spokes-character in television ads created by Conor Sheridan. Sinclair's catchphrase at the end of every commercial was "Ready to Tanqueray?" followed by a manic laugh. He was portrayed by Rodney Mason as a madcap socialite of Black British descent.

In the 2008 Mad Men episode "The Jet Set", Duck Phillips receives a crate of Tanqueray from his British former advertising colleagues as enticement for Duck to initiate their firm's purchase of Sterling Cooper.
