= C19H22O3 =

The molecular formula C_{19}H_{22}O_{3} (molar mass: 298.38 g/mol) may refer to:

- Auraptene, a natural bioactive monoterpene coumarin ether
- Doisynoestrol, a synthetic nonsteroidal estrogen of the doisynolic acid group
- Nematal 105, also known as 4-Pentylphenyl 4-methoxybenzoate
