= Auraptene =

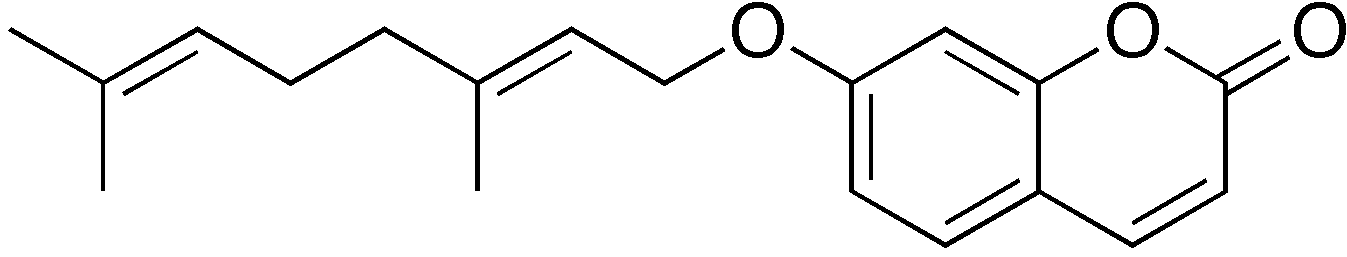

Names
- Preferred IUPAC name 7-{[(2E)-3,7-Dimethylocta-2,6-dien-1-yl]oxy}-2H-1-benzopyran-2-one
- Other names Aurapten; 7-Geranyloxycoumarin

Identifiers
CAS Number	495-02-3
3D model (JSmol)	Interactive image
ChEBI	CHEBI:134355
ChEMBL	ChEMBL307341
ChemSpider	1267148
PubChem CID	1550607
UNII	F79I1ZEL2E
CompTox Dashboard (EPA)	DTXSID80897576
- InChI: InChI=1S/C19H22O3/c1-14(2)5-4-6-15(3)11-12-21-17-9-7-16-8-10-19(20)22-18(16)13-17/h5,7-11,13H,4,6,12H2,1-3H3/b15-11+ Key: RSDDHGSKLOSQFK-RVDMUPIBSA-N; InChI=1/C19H22O3/c1-14(2)5-4-6-15(3)11-12-21-17-9-7-16-8-10-19(20)22-18(16)13-17/h5,7-11,13H,4,6,12H2,1-3H3/b15-11+ Key: RSDDHGSKLOSQFK-RVDMUPIBBL
- SMILES: O=C/2Oc1cc(OC\C=C(/C)CC\C=C(/C)C)ccc1\C=C\2

Properties
Chemical formula	C_{19}H_{22}O_{3}
Molar mass	298.376 g/mol
- Except where otherwise noted, data are given for materials in their standard state (at 25 °C [77 °F], 100 kPa). verify (what is ?) Infobox references

Auraptene is a natural bioactive monoterpene coumarin ether. It was first isolated from members of the genus Citrus.

Auraptene has shown some effect as a chemopreventative agent against cancers of liver, skin, tongue, esophagus, and colon in rodent models.

== See also ==
- C_{19}H_{22}O_{3}
