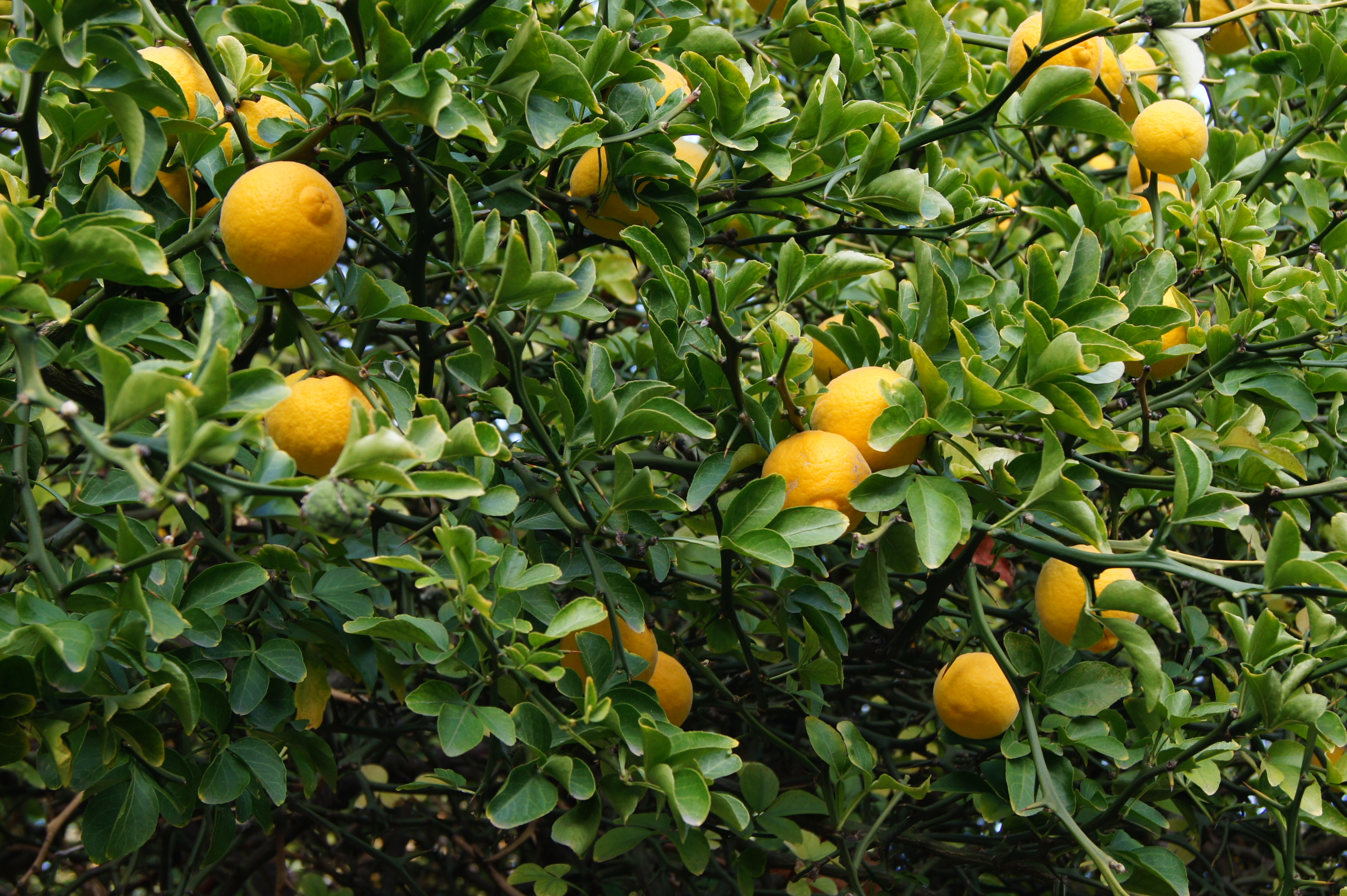
- A fruiting tree in Jardin des Plantes, Paris

Scientific classification
- Kingdom: Plantae
- Clade: Tracheophytes
- Clade: Angiosperms
- Clade: Eudicots
- Clade: Rosids
- Order: Sapindales
- Family: Rutaceae
- Genus: Citrus
- Species: C. trifoliata

Binomial name
- Citrus trifoliata L.

Synonyms
- Aegle sepiaria DC.; Bilacus trifoliata (L.) Kuntze; Citrus trifolia Thunb.; Citrus triptera Desf.; Poncirus trifoliata (L.) Raf; Pseudaegle sepiaria (DC.) Miq.

= Trifoliate orange =

Species of flowering plant

The trifoliate orange, Citrus trifoliata (syn. Poncirus trifoliata), is a member of the family Rutaceae. Whether the trifoliate oranges should be considered to belong to their own genus, Poncirus, or be included in the genus Citrus is debated. The species is unusual among citrus for having deciduous, compound leaves and pubescent (downy) fruit.

It is native to northern China and Korea, and is also known as the Japanese bitter-orange (karatachi), hardy orange or Chinese bitter orange.

The plant is a fairly cold-hardy citrus (USDA zone 6) and will tolerate moderate frost and snow, making a large shrub or small tree 4–8 m (13–26 ft) tall. Because of its relative hardiness, citrus grafted onto Citrus trifoliata are usually hardier than when grown on their own roots.

== Description ==
The trifoliate orange is recognizable by the large 3–5 cm (1.2–2.0 in) thorns on the shoots, and its deciduous leaves with three (or rarely, five) leaflets, typically with the middle leaflet 3–5 cm (1.2–2.0 in) long, and the two side leaflets 2–3 cm (0.79–1.18 in) long. The flowers are white, with pink stamens, 3–5 cm (1.2–2.0 in) in diameter, larger than those of true citrus but otherwise closely resembling them, except that the scent is much less pronounced than with true citrus. As with true citrus, the leaves give off a spicy smell when crushed.

The fruits are green, ripening to yellow, and 3–4 cm (1.2–1.6 in) in diameter similar in size to a lime and resembling a small orange, but with a finely downy surface and having a fuzzy texture similar to a peach. The fruits also have distinctive smell from other citrus varieties and often contain a high concentration of seeds.

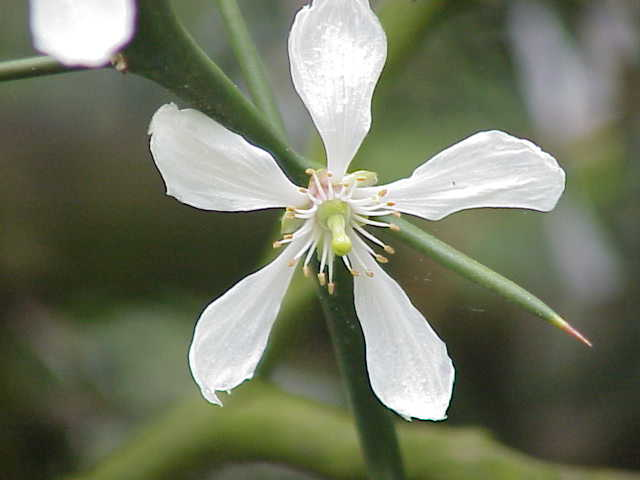
Flower

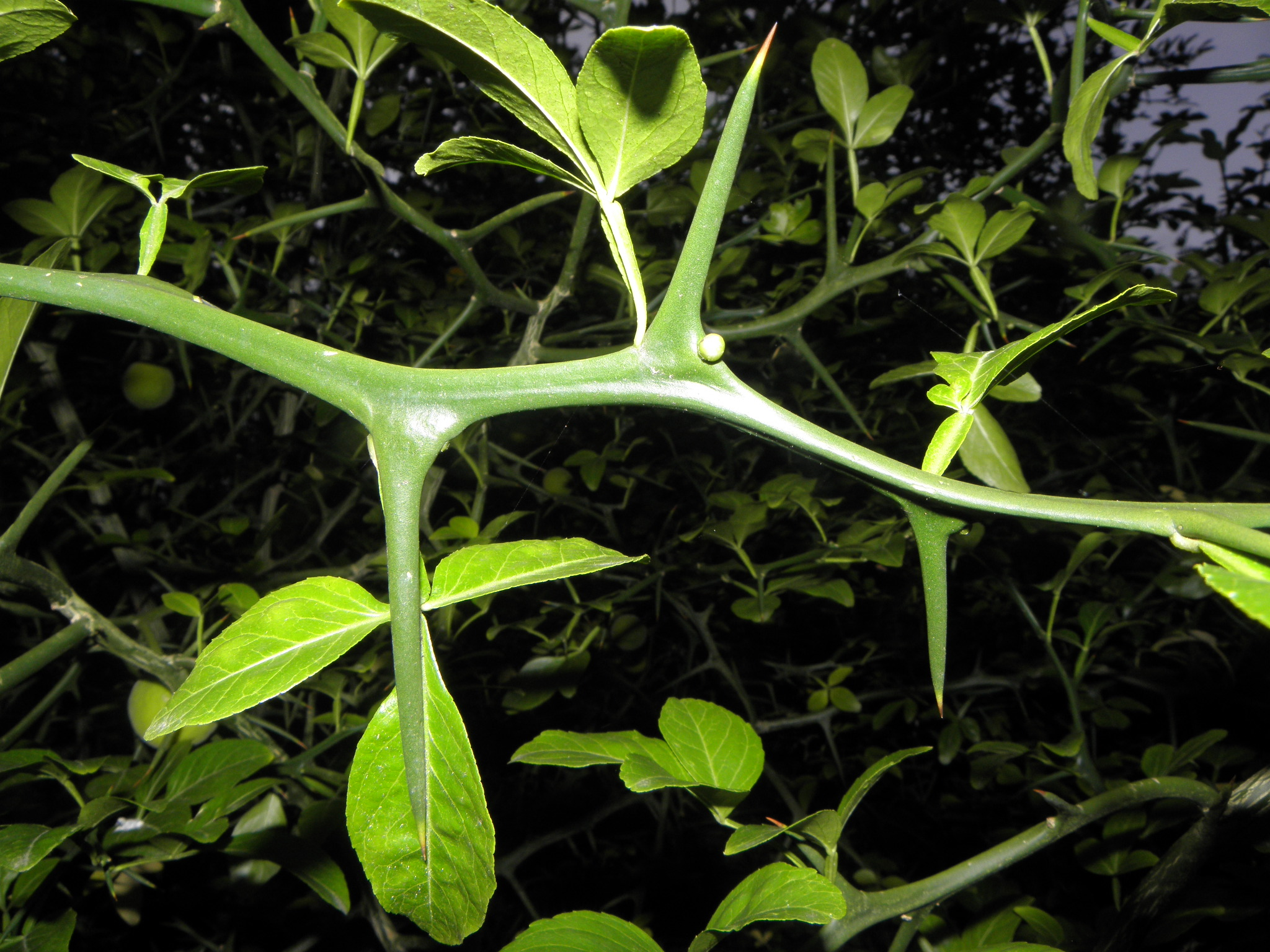
Leaves and thorns

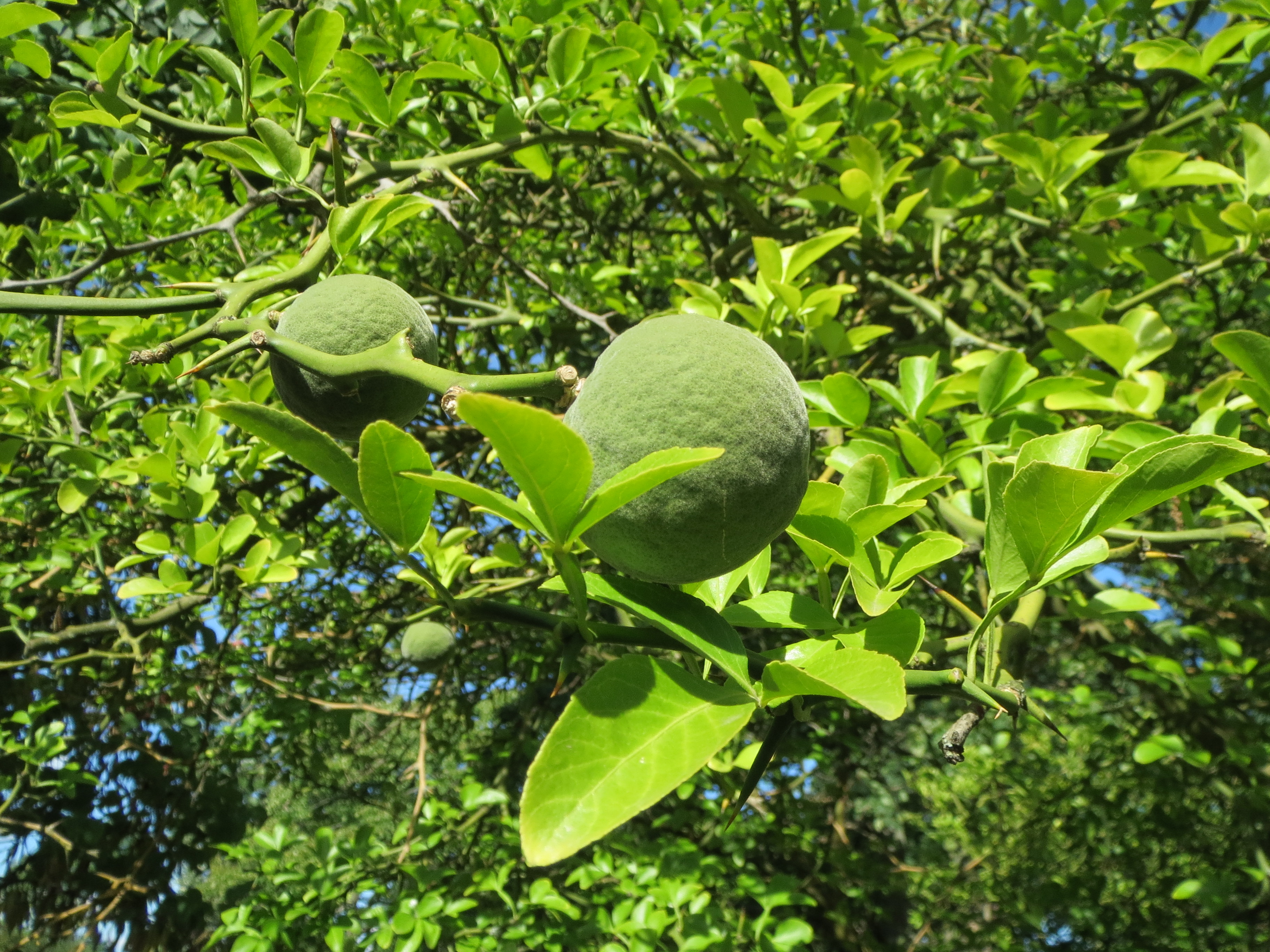
Green fruits

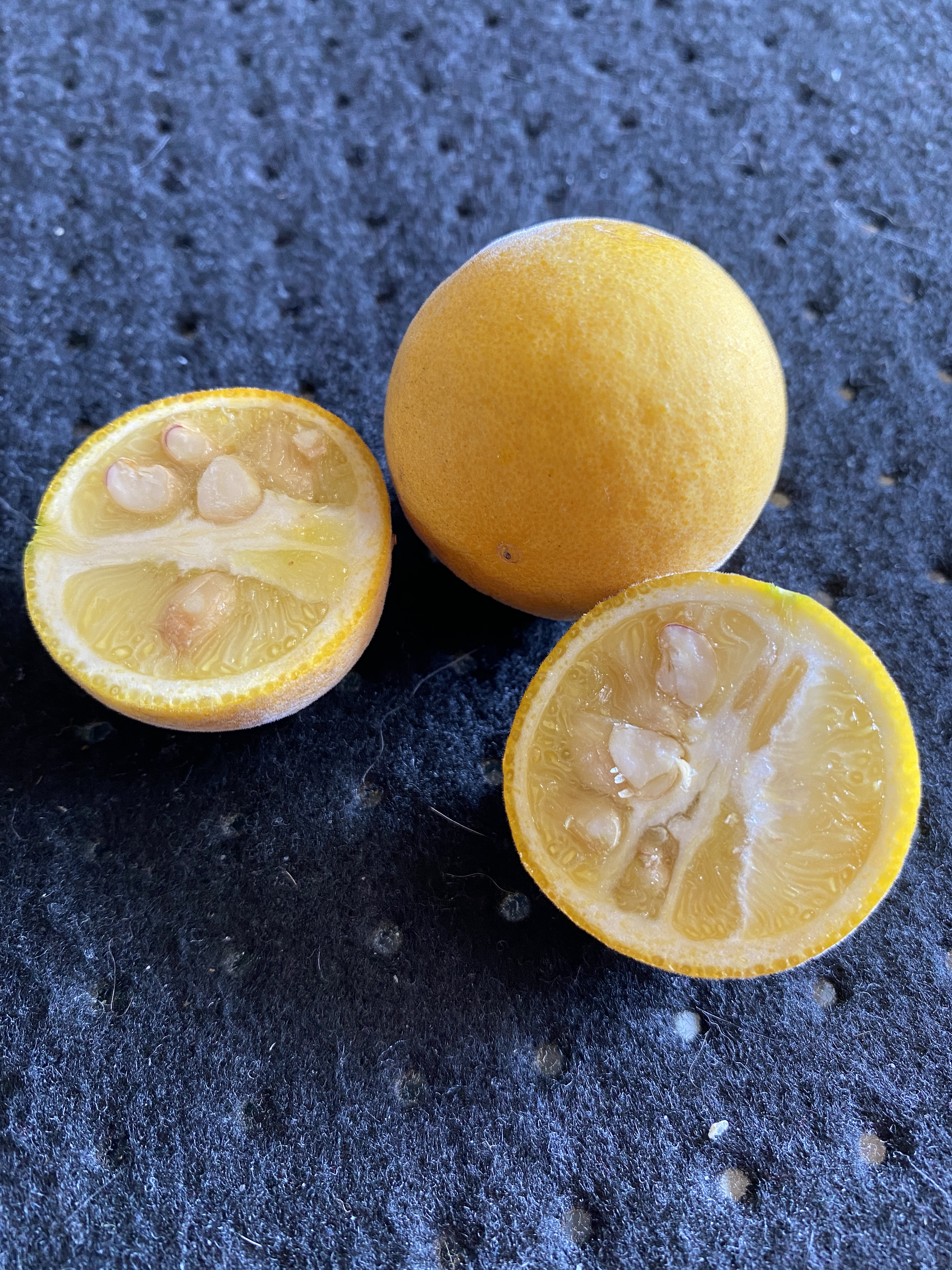
Fruit

== Uses ==
=== Cultivation ===
The cultivar 'Flying Dragon' is dwarfed in size, has highly twisted, contorted stems, and has even stronger thorns than the type. It makes an excellent barrier hedge due to its density and strong curved thorns. Such hedges have been grown for over 50 years at Oklahoma State University in Stillwater, and are highly student-proof. The plant is also highly deer-resistant. In central London, mature specimens of the trifoliate orange can be seen in the gardens of St Paul's Cathedral.

Trifoliate orange and various of its hybrids with other Citrus are widely used as citrus rootstock, which are valued for their resistance to cold, the tristeza virus, and the oomycete Phytophthora parasitica (root rot).

Recent studies have revealed that the trifoliate orange contains auraptene at a high concentration, which is one of the functional components having immunity against citrus tristeza virus (CTV).

=== As food ===
Trifoliate orange fruits are very bitter, due in part to their poncirin content. Most people consider them inedible fresh, but they can be made into marmalade. When dried and powdered, they can be used as a condiment.

=== Other uses ===
The fruits of the trifoliate orange are widely used in medical traditions of East Asia as a treatment for allergic inflammation.

The species has been planted as a security barrier due to its quick, dense growth and sharp thorns.

== Invasive status ==
Trifoliate orange is considered an invasive species throughout the Southeastern United States. While specific management recommendations vary from state to state, the general consensus of regional Agricultural researchers is to avoid ornamental plantings of the trifoliate orange and opt to plant native species instead. Throughout its introduced range, trifoliate orange is easily spread by windfall and through the droppings of animals.

== Taxonomy ==
The trifoliate orange was considered a member of the genus Citrus until Walter Swingle (1871–1952) moved it in 1943 to its own separate genus, Poncirus, based on its deciduous trifoliate leaves differing from other Citrus and as part of a larger reclassification that split the historical Citrus into seven genera. More recently, David Mabberley and Dianxiang Zhang reunited all of Swingle's novel genera back into Citrus in 2008. Early phylogenetic analysis of trifoliate orange plastids nested Poncirus within the citrus, consistent with a single genus, but the sequencing of the nuclear genome by Wu, et al. showed its genome to be most divergent, different enough to justify retention of Poncirus as a separate genus. To explain the conflict between the plastid and nuclear genomic analysis, it was speculated that the trifoliate orange is likely either the progeny of an ancient hybridization between a core citrus and an unidentified more distant relative, or at some time in its history it acquired an introgressed cpDNA genome from another species. Ollitrault, Curk and Krueger indicate that the majority of data are consistent with the enlarged Citrus that includes the trifoliate orange, though they recognize that many botanists still follow Swingle.

A second species of trifoliate orange native to Yunnan (China) has been reported and named Poncirus polyandra. Were Poncirus to be subsumed into Citrus, where C. polyandra is unavailable, the name Citrus polytrifolia has been suggested. Zhang and Mabberley concluded this Yunnan cultivar is likely a hybrid between the trifoliate orange and another Citrus, but recent genomic analysis of P. polyandra showed low levels of heterozygosity, the opposite of what one would expect for a hybrid. This analysis dated its divergence from P. trifoliata about 2.82 million years ago.

The trifoliate orange does not naturally interbreed with core Citrus taxa due to different flowering times, but hybrids have been produced artificially between the trifoliate orange and other citrus. In the Swingle system, where the trifoliate orange is placed in Poncirus, a hybrid genus name has been coined for these intra-generic crosses, "× Citroncirus". The most notable of these are the citrange, a cross between the trifoliate and sweet oranges, and the citrumelo, a hybrid of trifoliate orange and 'Duncan' grapefruit. Placing the trifoliate orange in Citrus would mean these hybrids would no longer be intergeneric, but instead hybrids within Citrus. Genomic analysis of a number of these hybrids showed them all to derive from P. trifoliata and not P. polyandra.
