= Blight =

Specific symptom affecting plants in response to infection by a pathogenic organism

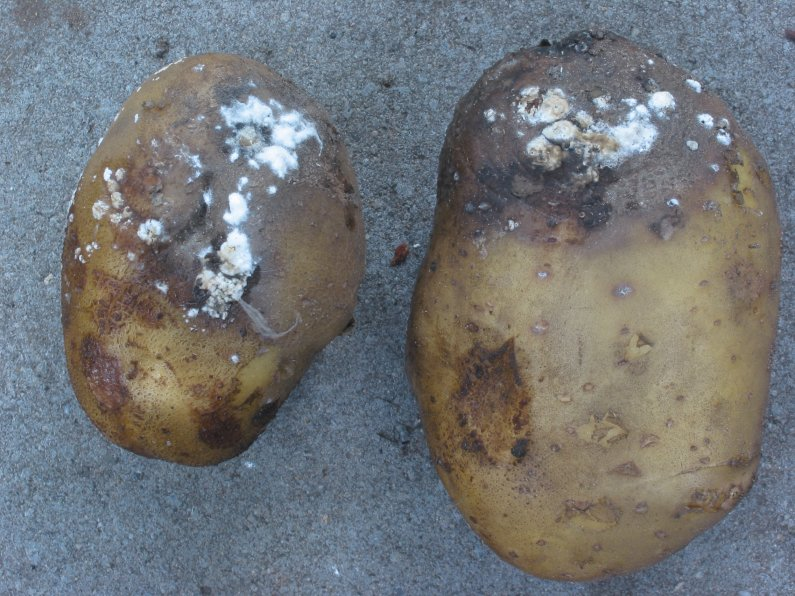
Potatoes destroyed by potato blight

Blight is a group of plant diseases sharing a specific symptom caused by infection by a pathogenic organism, often a fungus.

== Description ==
Blight is a rapid and complete chlorosis, browning, then death of plant tissues such as leaves, branches, twigs, or floral organs. Diseases called blights include:

- Late blight of potato, caused by the water mold Phytophthora infestans (Mont.) de Bary, the disease which led to the Great Irish Famine
- Southern corn leaf blight, caused by the fungus Cochliobolus heterostrophus (Drechs.) Drechs, anamorph Bipolaris maydis (Nisikado & Miyake) Shoemaker, incited a severe loss of corn in the United States in 1970.
- Chestnut blight, caused by the fungus Cryphonectria parasitica (Murrill) Barr, has nearly eradicated mature American chestnuts in North America.
- Citrus blight, caused by an unknown agent, infects all citrus scions.
- Fire blight of pome fruits, caused by the bacterium Erwinia amylovora (Burrill) Winslow et al., is the most severe disease of pear and is found in other fruits such as apple and raspberry.
- Bacterial leaf blight of rice, caused by the bacterium Xanthomonas oryzae (Uyeda & Ishiyama) Dowson.
- Bacterial seedling blight of rice (Oryza sativa), caused by pathogen Burkholderia plantarii
- Early blight of potato and tomato, caused by species of the ubiquitous fungal genus Alternaria
- Leaf blight of the grasses e.g. Ascochyta species and Alternaria triticina that causes blight in wheat
- Bur oak blight, caused by the fungal pathogen Tubakia iowensis.
- South American leaf blight, caused by the ascomycete Pseudocercospora ulei, also called Microcyclus ulei, ended the cultivation of the rubber tree (Hevea brasiliensis) in South America.

Blights are often named after their causative agent. For example, Colletotrichum blight is named after the fungus Colletotrichum capsici, and Phytophthora blight is named after the water mold Phytophthora parasitica.

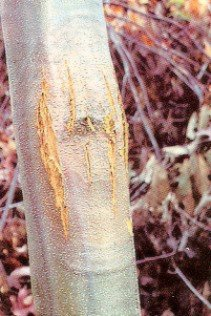
Chestnut blight

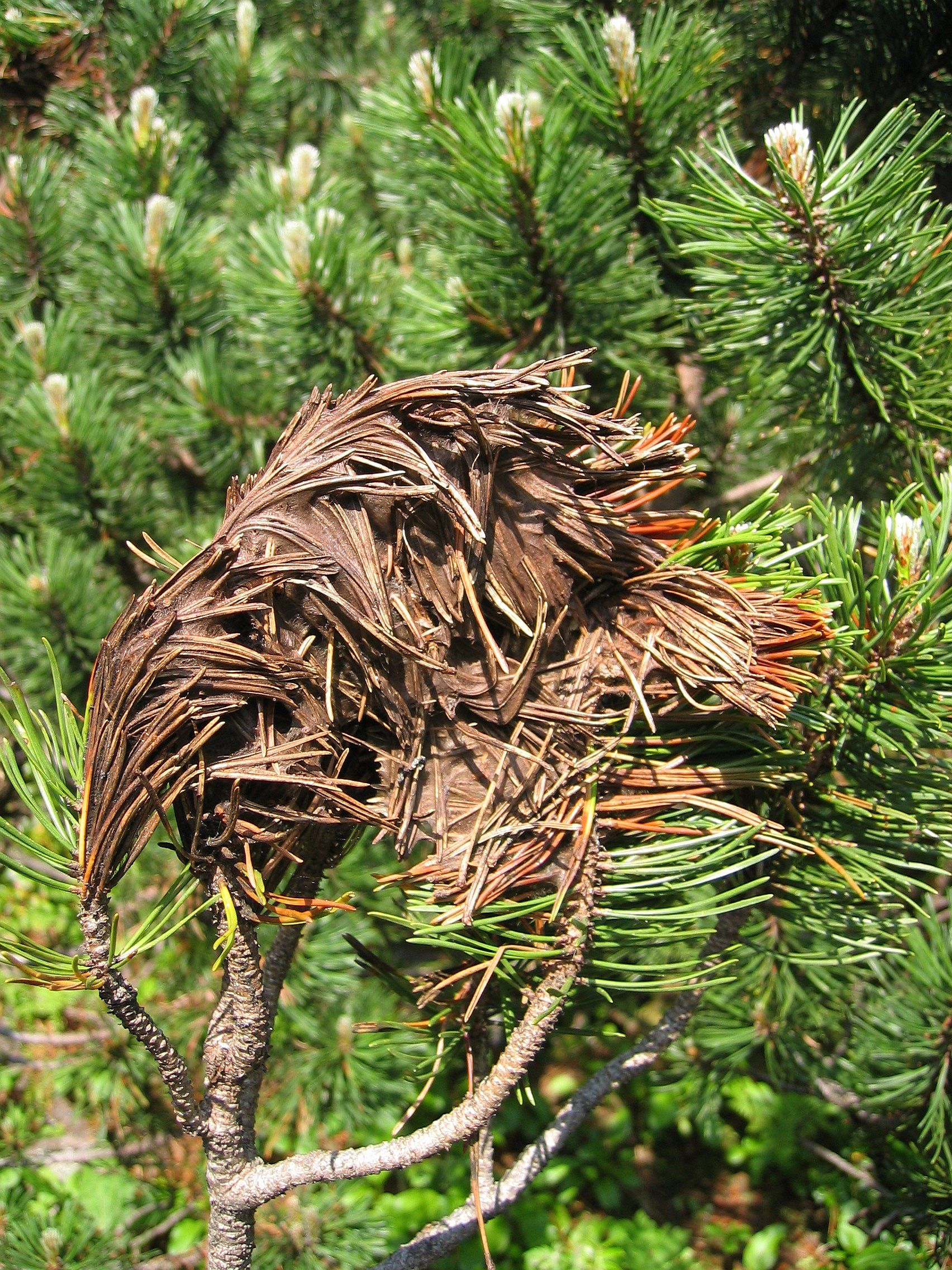
Brown felt blight

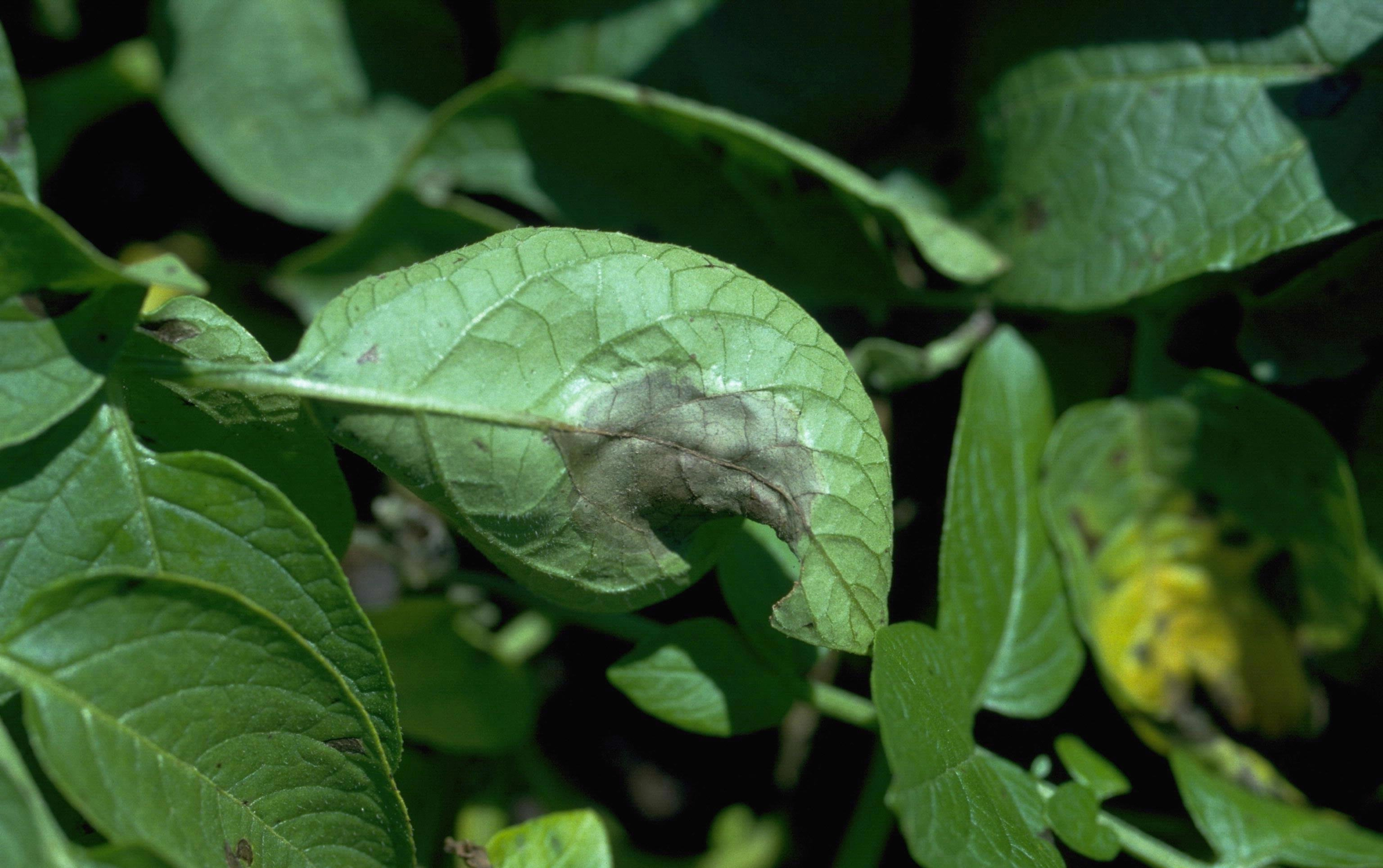
Potato late blight

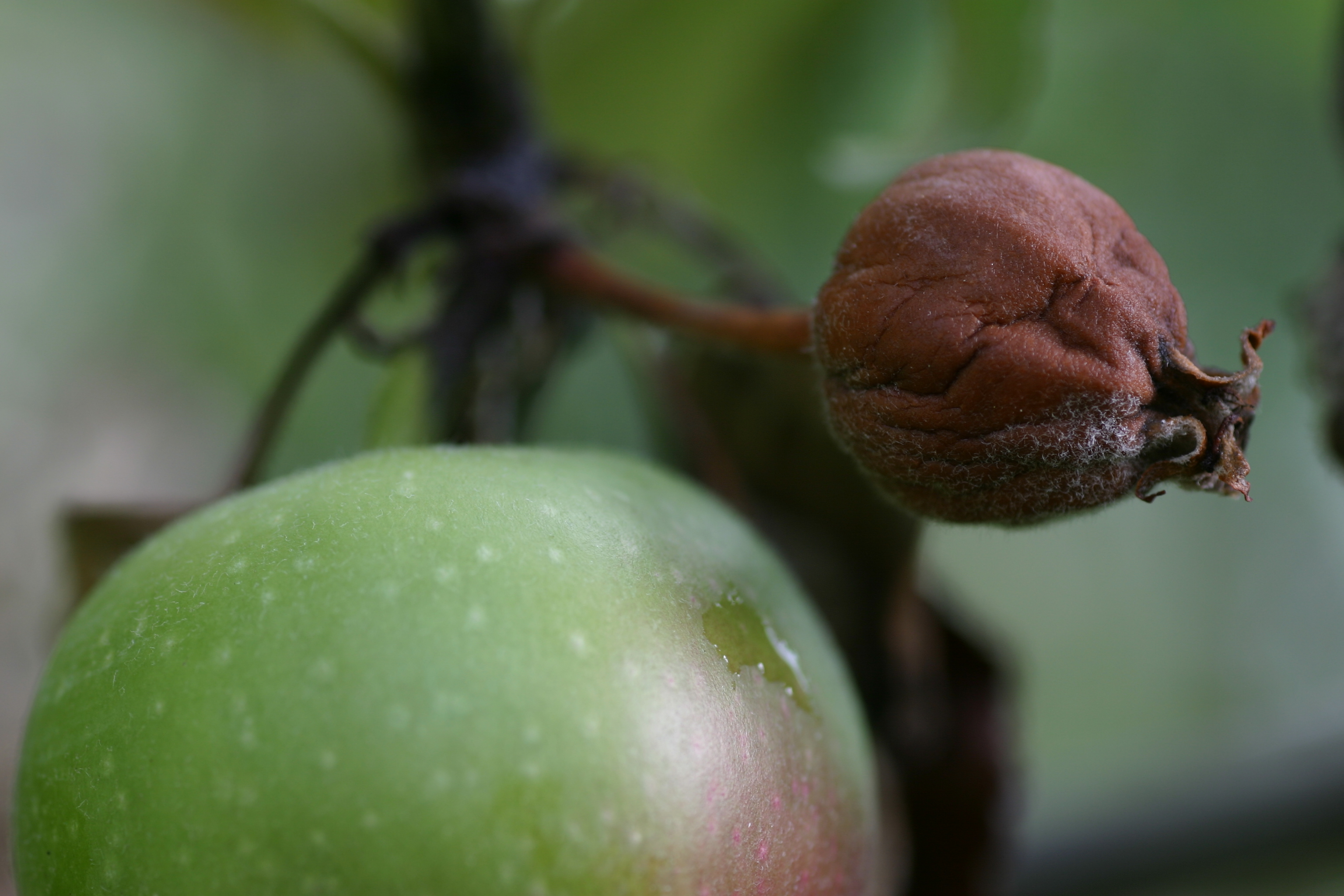
Fire blight on apple

== Historical blight events ==
When blights have been particularly large-scale and consequential in their effects, they have sometimes become named historical events. One such was the 19th Century European Potato Failure, known in Ireland as the "Great Famine". It was caused by a strain of potato blight, Phytophthora infestans.

Another was the near extinction of the Bermuda cedar during the 1940s and 1950s in the event described as The Blight or The Cedar Blight, caused by coccoid scale insects.
