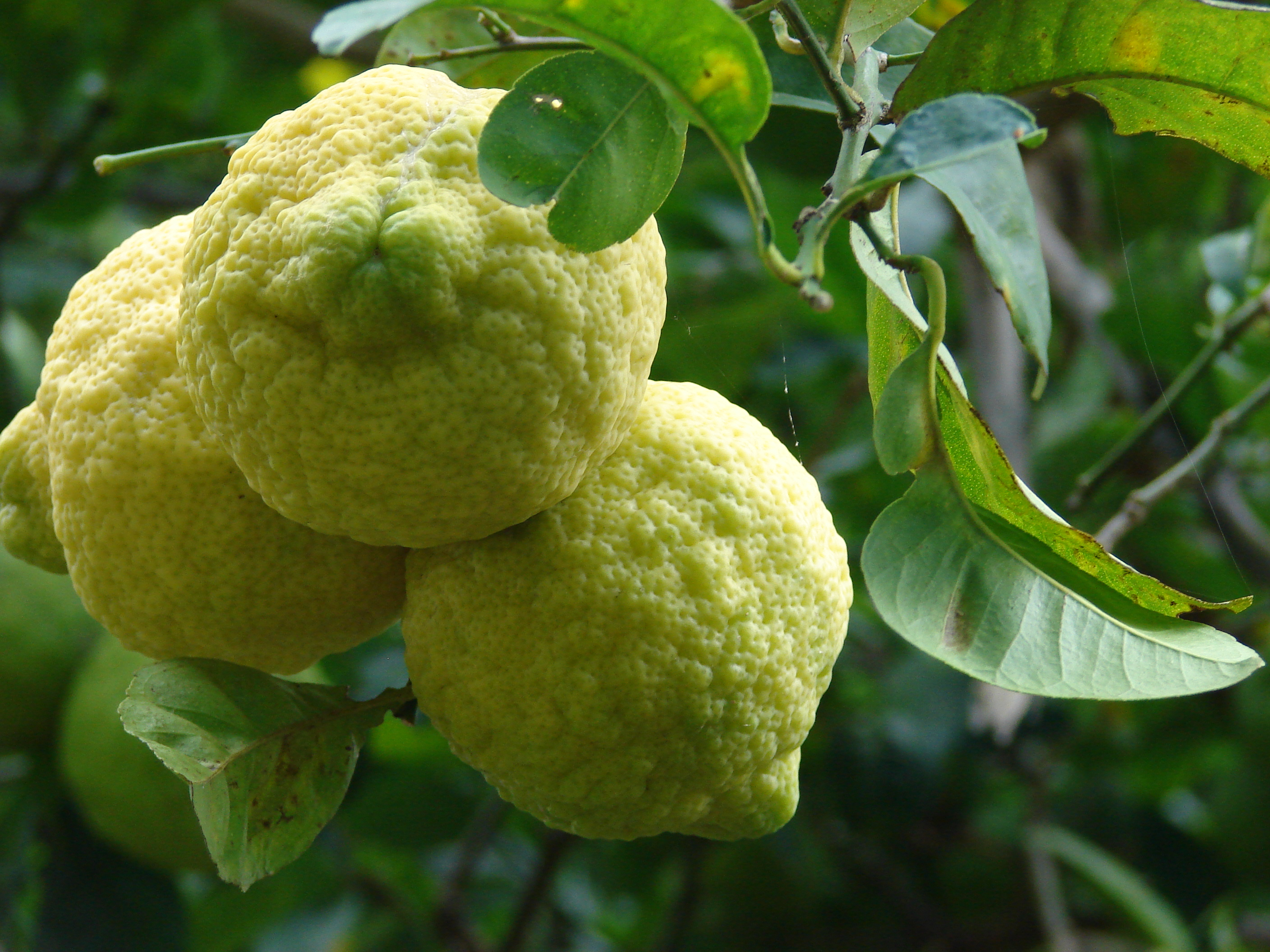

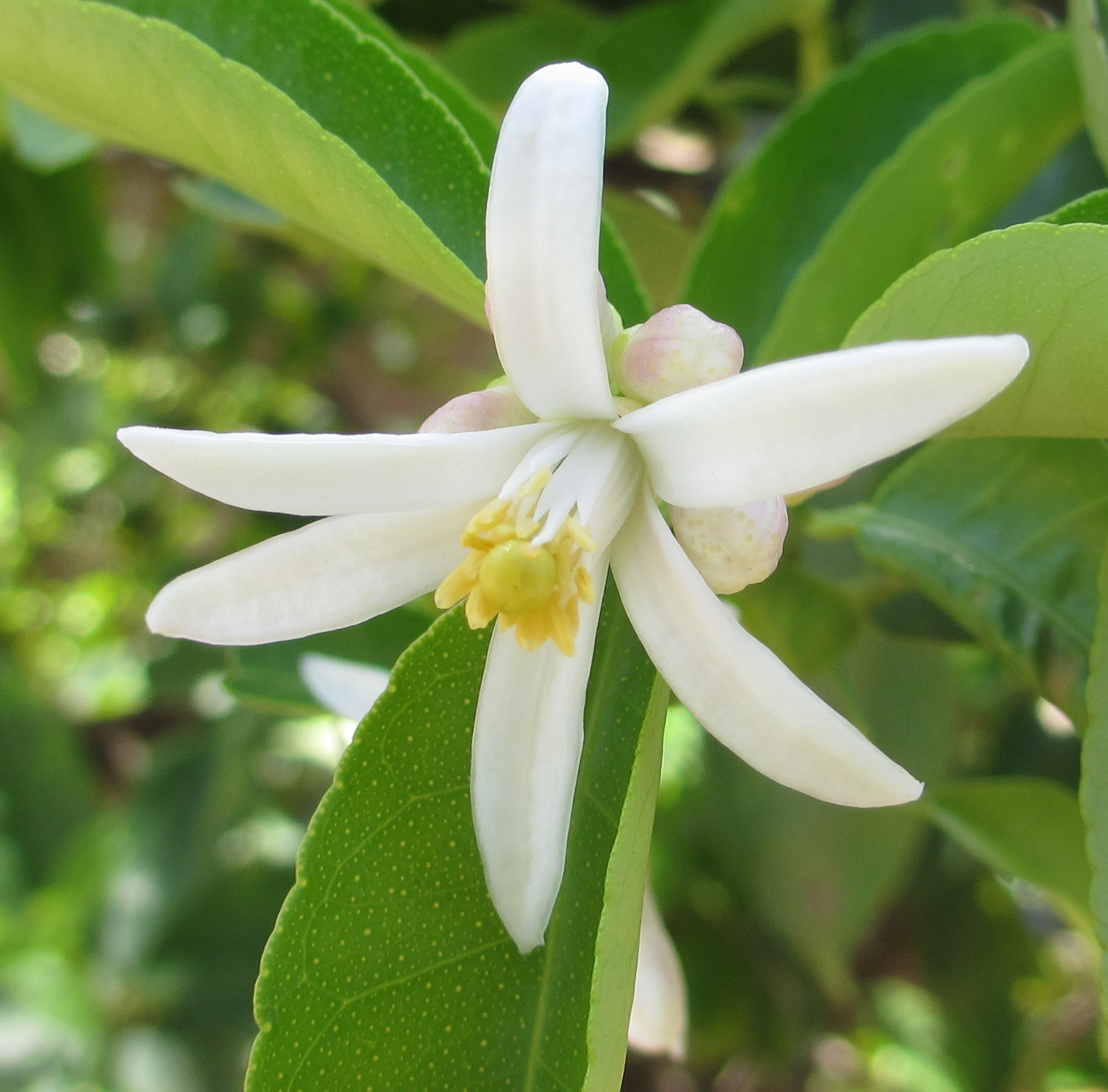
- Flower of Citrus × jambhiri

Scientific classification
- Kingdom: Plantae
- Clade: Embryophytes
- Clade: Tracheophytes
- Clade: Spermatophytes
- Clade: Angiosperms
- Clade: Eudicots
- Clade: Rosids
- Order: Sapindales
- Family: Rutaceae
- Genus: Citrus
- Species: C. × jambhiri

Binomial name
- Citrus × jambhiri Lush.

= Rough lemon =

Citrus × jambhiri

Citrus fruit and plant

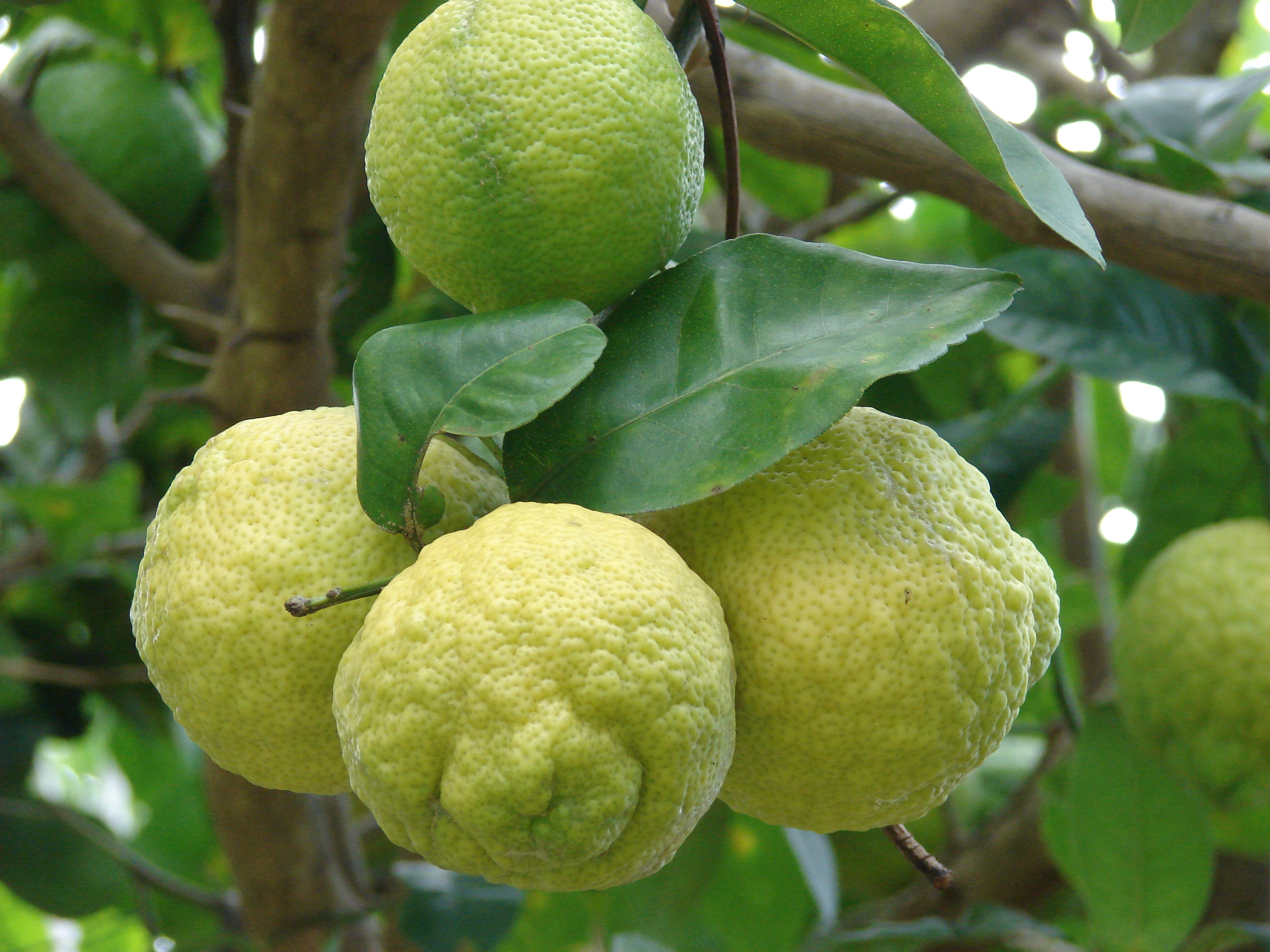
Rough lemon

Rough lemon (Citrus × jambhiri Lush.) is the fruit and the tree of a citrus hybrid. Like the rangpur, it is a cross between mandarin orange and citron.

Rough lemon is a cold-hardy citrus and can grow into a large tree.

The rough lemon is mostly rind, making it less edible than other citrus. As a result, the rough lemon is mainly used for citrus rootstock, however areas of South Africa and India do consume it and is the main lemon variety cultivated on Norfolk Island. There are several cultivars of rough lemon that can serve as a citrus rootstock, including 'Florida', 'Schaub', and 'Vangassay' rough lemon. The process for using the rough lemon as a citrus rootstock would start with mashing up the rough lemons. The mashed up rough lemons would then be put in a furrow, which is a long trench. This yellow mash would produce seedlings, which would end up growing into orange or grapefruit trees through shield budding, also known as T budding.
