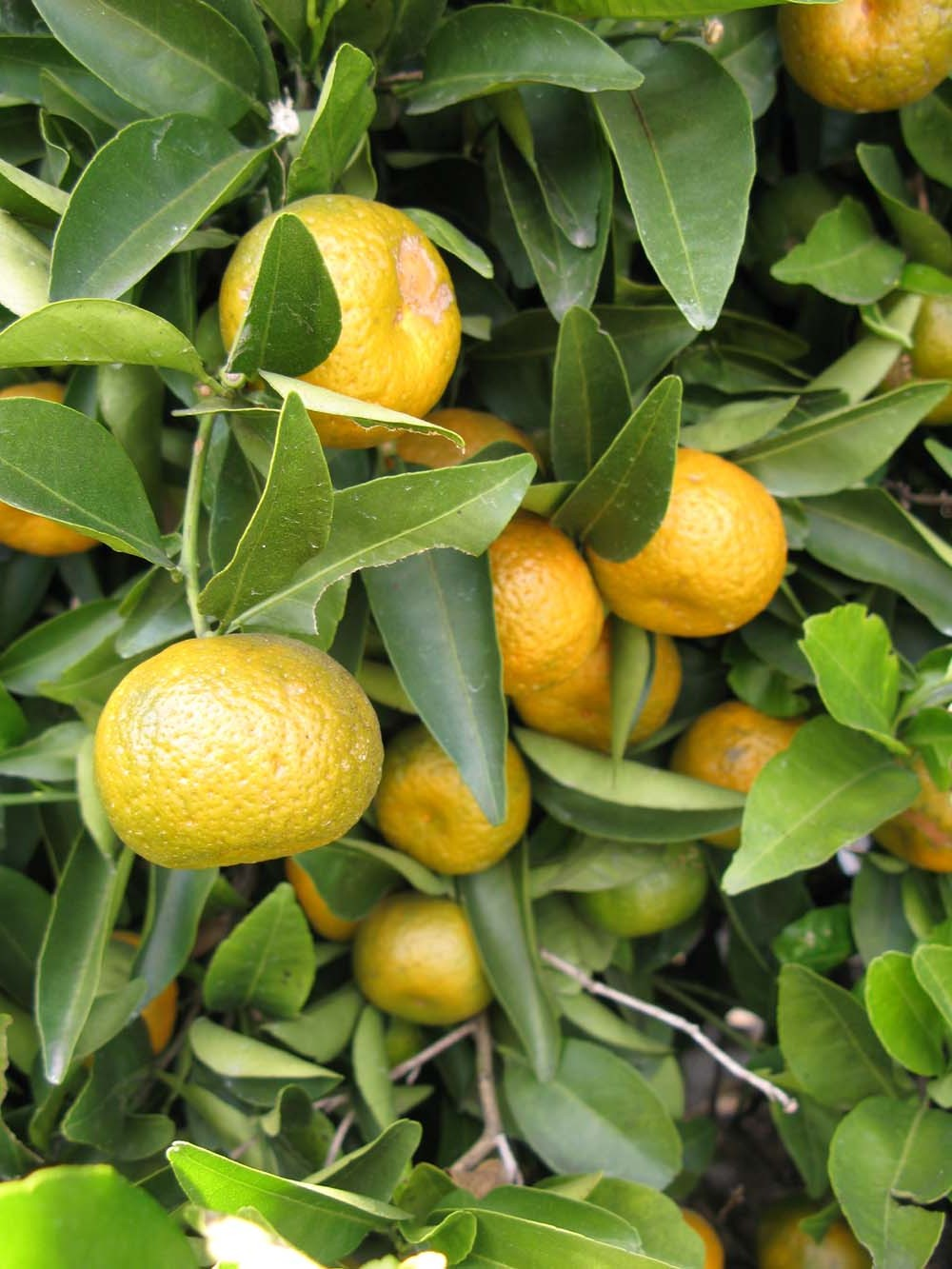
- Citrus reshni

Scientific classification
- Kingdom: Plantae
- Clade: Tracheophytes
- Clade: Angiosperms
- Clade: Eudicots
- Clade: Rosids
- Order: Sapindales
- Family: Rutaceae
- Genus: Citrus
- Species: C. reshni

Binomial name
- Citrus reshni (Engl.) Yu.Tanaka

= Citrus reshni =

Citrus fruit and plant

Citrus reshni also known as Cleopatra mandarin is a citrus tree that is commonly used in agriculture as a rootstock of different cultivated species of citrus, mostly orange, grapefruit, tangerine and lemon. It originated in India and later was introduced to Florida from Jamaica in the mid-nineteenth century.

The Cleopatra mandarin fruit belong to the "acidic" group of mandarins, which are too sour to be edible. When they are grown it is for the rootstock or for juice production. The rootstock can handle multiple soil conditions including tolerance to the presence of limestone, salinity and soil alkalinity along with being suitable for shallow soils. It is resistant to citrus tristeza virus and exocortis but is sensitive to root asphyxia and Phytophthora. One of the down sides to using the rootstock is it grows slow in the early years. In the right conditions it can induce high productivity and excellent fruit quality, although these are usually somewhat smaller than with others.
