= Citrus tristeza virus =

Virus classification
- (unranked): Virus
- Realm: Riboviria
- Kingdom: Orthornavirae
- Phylum: Kitrinoviricota
- Class: Alsuviricetes
- Order: Martellivirales
- Family: Closteroviridae
- Genus: Closterovirus
- Species: Closterovirus tristezae

Synonyms
- Citrus quick decline virus Hassaku dwarf virus Lime dieback virus

Species of virus

Citrus tristeza virus (CTV) is a viral species of the genus Closterovirus that causes the most economically damaging disease to its namesake plant genus, Citrus. The disease has led to the death of millions of Citrus trees all over the world and has rendered millions of others useless for production. Farmers in Brazil and other South American countries gave it the name "tristeza", meaning sadness in Portuguese and Spanish, referring to the devastation produced by the disease in the 1930s. The virus is transmitted most efficiently by the brown citrus aphid.

== The pathogen ==
CTV is a flexuous rod virus with dimensions of 2000 nm long and 12 nm in diameter. The CTV genome is typically between 19.2 and 19.3 kb long and consists of a single strand of (+)-sense RNA enclosed by two types of capsid proteins. The size of its genome makes CTV one of the largest RNA viruses known. The CTV genome contains 12 open reading frames, which could encode at least 17 proteins.

== Hosts and symptoms ==
CTV infects several species of the plant genus, Citrus, including sour orange (Citrus aurantium) and any Citrus grafted onto sour orange rootstock, key lime and Seville orange (C. × aurantifolia), Hassaku and sweet orange (C. × sinensis), grapefruit (C. × paradisi), and mandarin (C. reticulata).

CTV is also known to infect Aeglopsis chevalieri, Afraegle paniculata and Pamburus missionis of the citrus subfamily Aurantioideae, as well as Passiflora gracilis which belongs to an entirely different lineage of rosid plants. CTV is distributed worldwide and can be found wherever citrus trees grow.

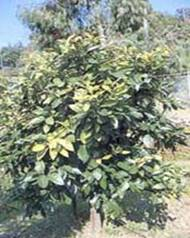
Leaf chlorosis

Symptoms of CTV infection are highly variable and depend on several factors including host, virulence of the particular virus strain, and environmental conditions. The three most common groupings of symptoms are decline (quick and slow), stem-pitting, and seedling yellows.

Decline is generally exhibited with sweet orange, mandarin, or grapefruit when they are grafted on infected sour orange rootstock. This decline includes chlorotic leaves and general dieback of the infected tree. Decline may be slow, lasting several months to years after the first symptoms are noticed. In this case the infected tree will also show a bulge above the bud union and honeycombing on the inner face of the original sour orange root stock bark. The decline may also be quick, resulting in host death just days after the first symptoms are noticed.

Stem-pitting is another symptom of CTV that manifests in most host types under the proper conditions, and especially in Citrus trees grafted onto sour orange rootstock. The host will develop pits in the trunk and stem. This results is decreased tree vigor and reduced fruit yield. This is typically caused by the more virulent strains of CTV.

The third major symptom of CTV infection is seedling yellows. This tends to occur on sour orange, Natsudaidai, lemon and buntan. Symptoms include yellowing of foliage and general dieback.

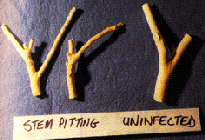
CTV-pitted vs healthy citrus stems

== Diagnosis ==
CTV is classically diagnosed by graft-inoculating a Mexican lime (Citrus aurantifolia) with tissue from a diseased plant. The Mexican lime will develop highly predictable symptoms. Symptoms on the leaves begin as clear veins that turn corky, which is then followed by chlorosis and cupping of the leaf. Particularly severe strains may result in stunting, and stem-pitting may also occur. Alternatively CTV can be indicated by the presence of aggregates of cross-banded inclusion bodies in the phloem of the diseased plant. Other diagnostic procedures include electron microscopy, double-antibody sandwich enzyme-linked immunosorbent assay (DAS-ELISA), tissue-print ELISA, and PCR-based assays. These methods identify signs of the virus, such as its microscopic structure (electron microscopy), the presence of its proteins’ antigens (ELISA) or the presence of its RNA (PCR).

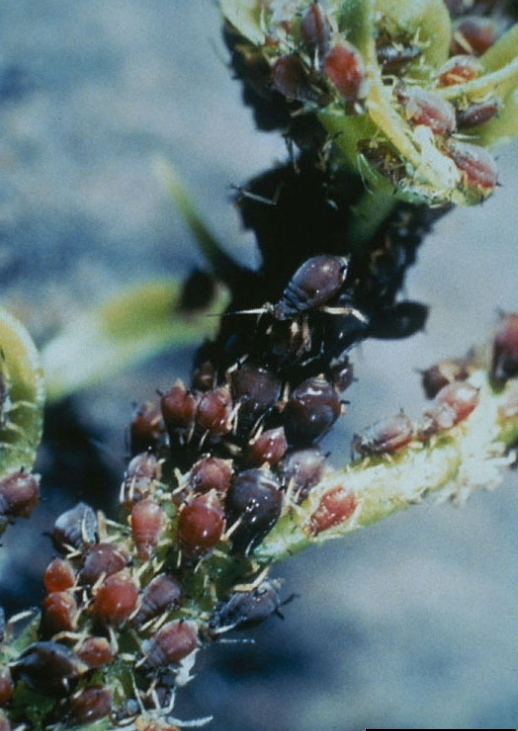
Toxopterax citricida, the most harmful CTV-transmitting vector

== Epidemiology ==
CTV is a virus that is limited to the phloem tissues of its host. It is transmitted semi-persistently by vectors that penetrate the phloem to extract sap, mostly the aphid species that colonize the crop. The brown citrus aphid is considerably more efficient at transmitting the virus than are other aphids that infest citrus. In Florida, it has been shown to be from six to twenty five times as efficient as Aphis gossypii, the most efficient vector found in the state before the introduction of the brown citrus aphid prior to 1995. This efficiency is enhanced by the narrow host range of the brown citrus aphid and its tendency to produce winged forms in order to colonize new growth. A. gossypii has a much wider host range, including hundreds of plant species in Florida, and the transmission of the virus is blocked when it feeds on a different host.

== Environment ==
Aphids are the main vector by which CTV is transmitted. Initially the United States had as vectors only Aphis gossypii (melon-and-cotton aphid), A.spiraecola (green citrus aphid), and the black (or brown) citrus aphid Toxoptera aurantii. These aphids transmit the virus much less efficiently than Toxoptera citricida, the oriental citrus aphid. Toxoptera citricida had been found in East Asia and South America, and had slowly made its way up through Central America and the Caribbean Islands. By 1993 it had reached Cuba, and in 1995 it was found in Florida.

The aphids require at least 30 to 60 minutes of feeding to acquire the virus, and remain viruliferous for at least 24 hours after. T. citricida is much more efficient than the other aphids, and it can transmit CTV strains causing severe stem pitting or decline that the other aphids cannot vector. Even though A. spiraecola is less efficient, it tends to have higher populations and thus can still transfer the virus fairly well. T. aurantii has been shown to only transmit certain strains of CTV. Of the three lesser efficient aphids, A. gossypii has a 78% transmission efficiency, while A. spiraecola and T. aurantii are between 0-6%. There is laboratory evidence that the psyllid Diaphorina citri may also be a relevant vector. The main cultural practice that increases the severity of the CTV is when the citrus trees are grafted onto the sour orange rootstock. Using CTV infected budwood for grafting can transfer the CTV from the original tree to the new one.

== Management ==
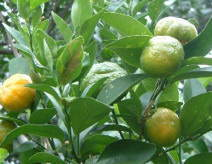
Citrus × depressa used as rootstock suppresses tristeza disease

When CTV was first discovered, quarantine was the best management strategy, now quarantining only works for areas where a small amount of trees are infected. The other approach that was adopted after T. citricida came to the U.S. was destroying any tree in which the budwood was not free of CTV. This is a more drastic measure but must be done due to how fast T. citricida can spread the virus. If there is any CTV in the area, avoid grafting trees on sour orange rootstock and instead graft on tristeza-tolerant rootstock. Since the virus has been in Asia a long time they have used rootstock from trifoliate orange, Sunki, and Shiikuwasha (C. × depressa) for many years. Some hybrids, such as Troyer citrange or Swingle citromelo, show promise as resistant root-stock. Also, using scion varieties tolerant to stem pitting is recommended.

The production of virus-free trees by shoot-tip grafting or heat treatment is very important. If it is possible to keep the field permanently free of CTV, the planting of virus-free trees is practical. In areas where it is difficult to find a virus-free field, preinoculation with a mild CTV strain protects trees against infection with a severe strain of CTV. Bud-stock trees should be inoculated with a mild CTV strain at least four to six months prior to propagation. They should then be kept in a greenhouse, under aphid-free conditions. It is also recommended that nurseries of young plants grown for propagation should be kept vector-free. Top-grafting with pre-inoculated buds onto interstock trees infested with severe CTV is not effective, because the tree has little protection against the disease. It is necessary to spray nursery plants and young trees with insecticide occasionally, to control aphids. This should retard any re-infection with the virus.

A biological approach has been to bring in a parasitoid wasp from Asia that naturally controls A. spiraecola. This approach was stopped when T. citricida arrived due to it not being a parasite of the more important aphid. There is a natural parasite of aphids in Florida in the gall midge family Cecidomyiidae that attempts to keep aphid levels down, however due to the influx in aphid population it has not been able to keep populations down.

== Importance ==
CTV is the most economically important and damaging virus of citrus trees. It can be spread quickly and do damage not only by killing trees with sour orange rootstock, but also by stem pitting normal citrus trees. It has killed more than 80 million trees worldwide, mainly in South Africa since 1910, Argentina (10 million) and Brazil (6 million) since 1970, and the U.S. (3 million) since 1950. With the spreading of T. citricida the severity and impact has increased dramatically in Central America and the U.S. In Spain there has been a progressive decline in production from over 40 million sweet orange and mandarin trees.
