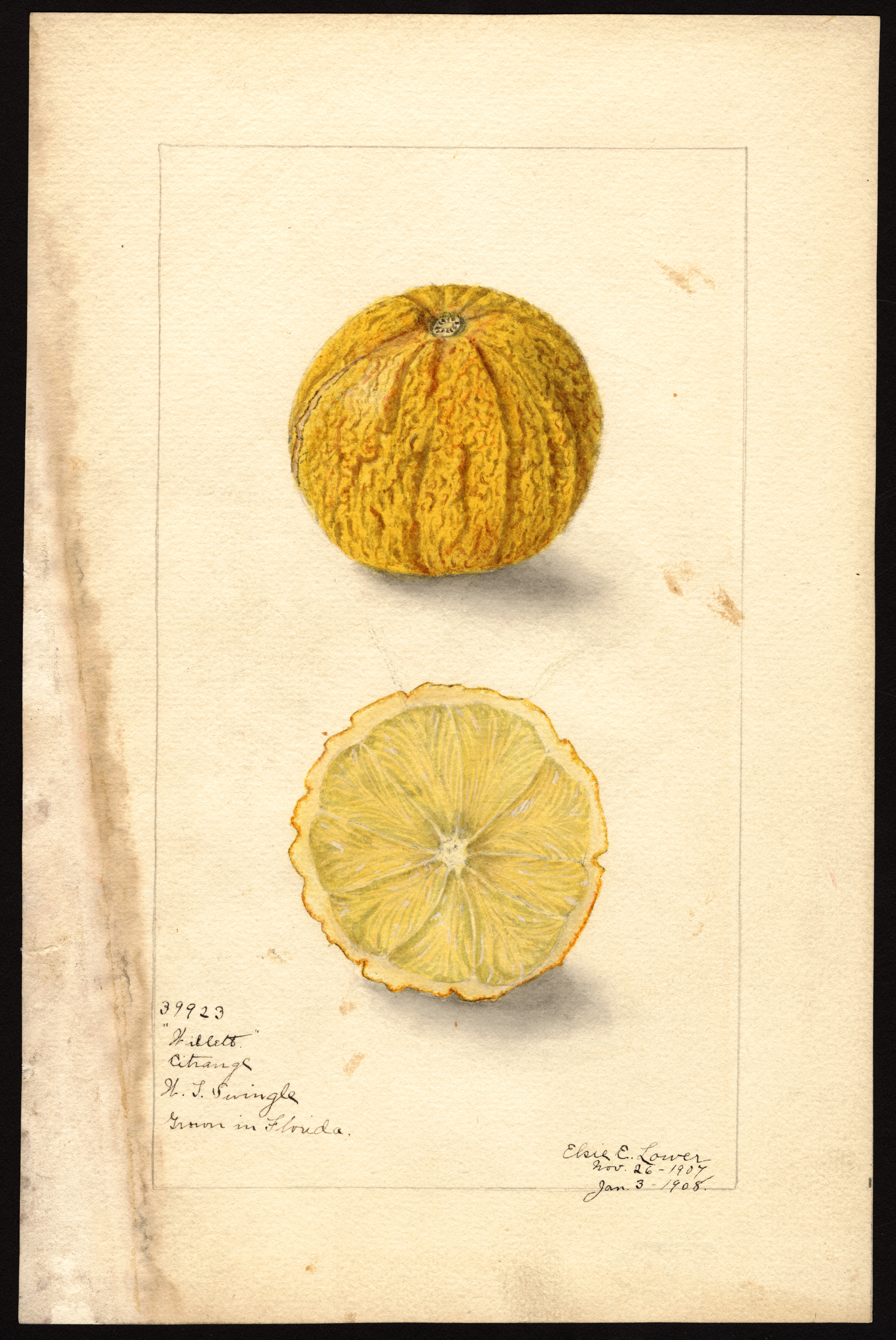
- Citrange cultivar 'Willett'

Scientific classification
- Kingdom: Plantae
- Clade: Embryophytes
- Clade: Tracheophytes
- Clade: Angiosperms
- Clade: Eudicots
- Clade: Rosids
- Order: Sapindales
- Family: Rutaceae
- Genus: Citrus
- Species: C. × insitorum

Binomial name
- Citrus × insitorum Mabb.

Synonyms
- × Citroncirus webberi J.W. Ingram & H.E. Moore 1975

= Citrange =

Citrus fruit and plant

The citrange (a portmanteau of citrus and orange) is a citrus hybrid of the sweet orange and the trifoliate orange.

The purpose of this cross was to attempt to create a cold hardy citrus tree (which is the nature of a trifoliate), with delicious fruit like those of the sweet orange. However, citranges are generally bitter.

Citrange is used as a rootstock for citrus in Morocco, but does not prevent dry root rot or exocortis disease.

== Cultivars ==
There are several named citrange cultivars, including the 'Carrizo' citrange and the 'Troyer' citrange. Both resulted from a hybrid between the trifoliate orange and the Washington navel orange. There is also a cultivar called 'Rusk' which resulted from a cross between a Ruby orange and a trifoliate orange.

== See also ==
- Citrangequat
- List of citrus diseases
- University of California, Riverside Citrus Variety Collection
