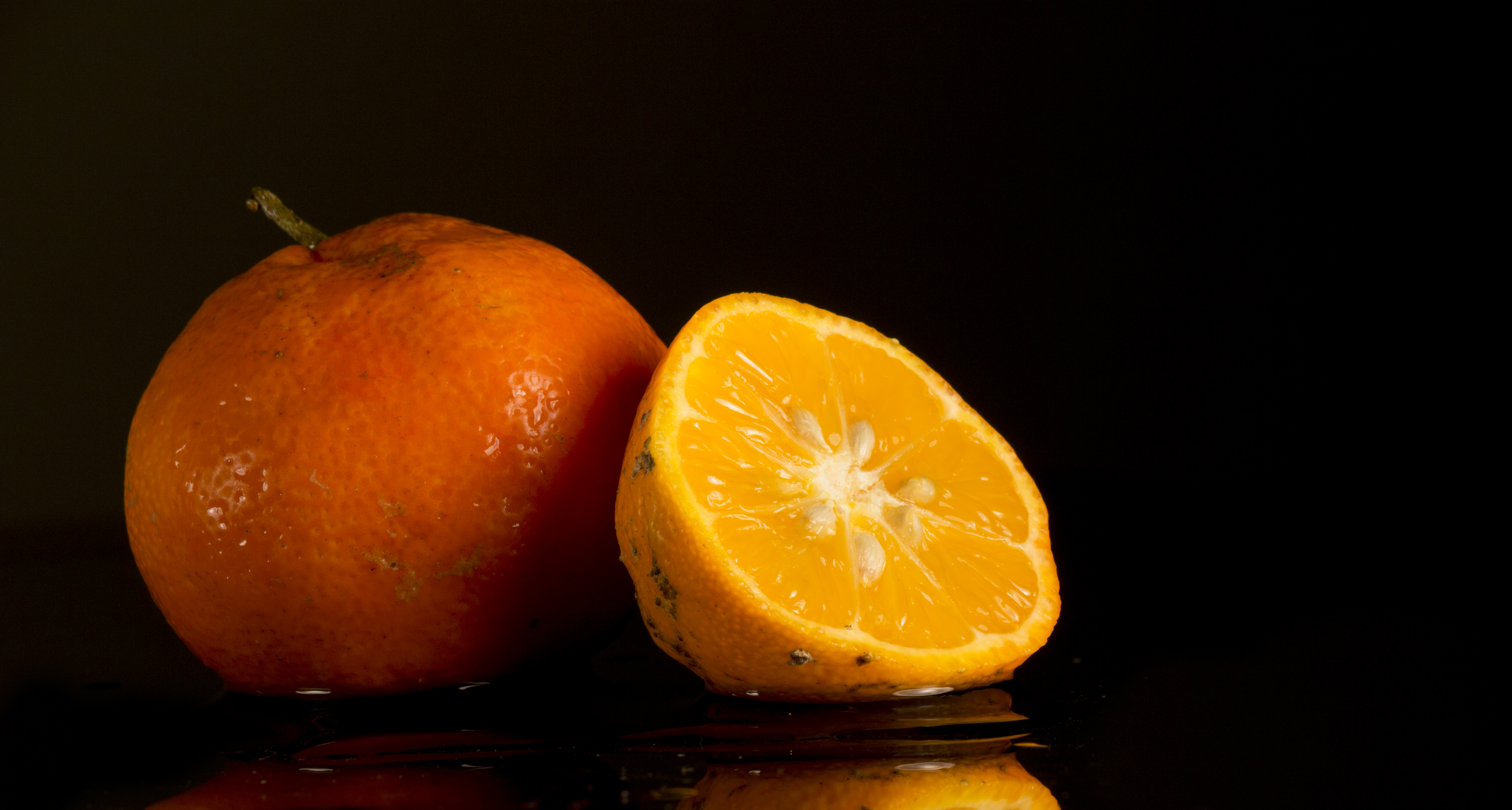
- Rangpur fruit

Scientific classification
- Kingdom: Plantae
- Clade: Tracheophytes
- Clade: Angiosperms
- Clade: Eudicots
- Clade: Rosids
- Order: Sapindales
- Family: Rutaceae
- Genus: Citrus
- Species: C. × limonia

Binomial name
- Citrus × limonia Osbeck

= Rangpur lime =

Rangpur Citrus × limonia

Species of fruit and plant

Rangpur lime, Citrus × limonia or Citrus reticulata × medica, sometimes called the mandarin lime or lemandarin, is a hybrid between the mandarin orange and the citron. It is a citrus fruit with a very acidic taste and an orange peel and flesh.

== Common names ==
It takes its name after Rangpur, a Bangladeshi city. Rangpur is also known in South Asia as Gondhoraj Lebu, Sylhet lime (after another region also now in Bangladesh), surkh nimboo, and sharbati. It is known as a canton-lemon in South China, a hime-lemon in Japan, as limão-cravo in Brazil, and mandarin-lime in the United States.

== History ==
The Rangpur lime (Citrus × limonia) originated in South Asia and was later introduced to the West. Although often mistaken for a lemon hybrid, genomic studies reveal that it is actually an F1 hybrid of a female citron (Citrus medica) and a male mandarin orange (Citrus reticulata). The fruit was widely cultivated in Rangpur, Bangladesh, where it became well known for its sour, lime-like flavor despite its orange skin. In the late nineteenth century, the Reasoner Brothers of Oneco, Florida, introduced the Rangpur lime to the United States, after obtaining seeds from northwestern Bangladesh. Since then, it has been grown not only for its culinary uses but also as a hardy rootstock for grafting other citrus varieties, spreading its influence far beyond its Bangladeshi roots.

== Use ==
Rangpurs are highly acidic and can be used as a substitute for limes. However the name lime in connection with this fruit is misleading, because there are very few similarities between the rangpur and other fruits called limes.

In 2006, Diageo introduced a rangpur-flavored version of Tanqueray gin, known simply as Tanqueray Rangpur.

=== Cultivation ===
Citrus × limonia is cultivated as an ornamental tree for planting in gardens and a container plant on patios and terraces in the United States. Outside the U.S. it is used principally as a citrus rootstock.

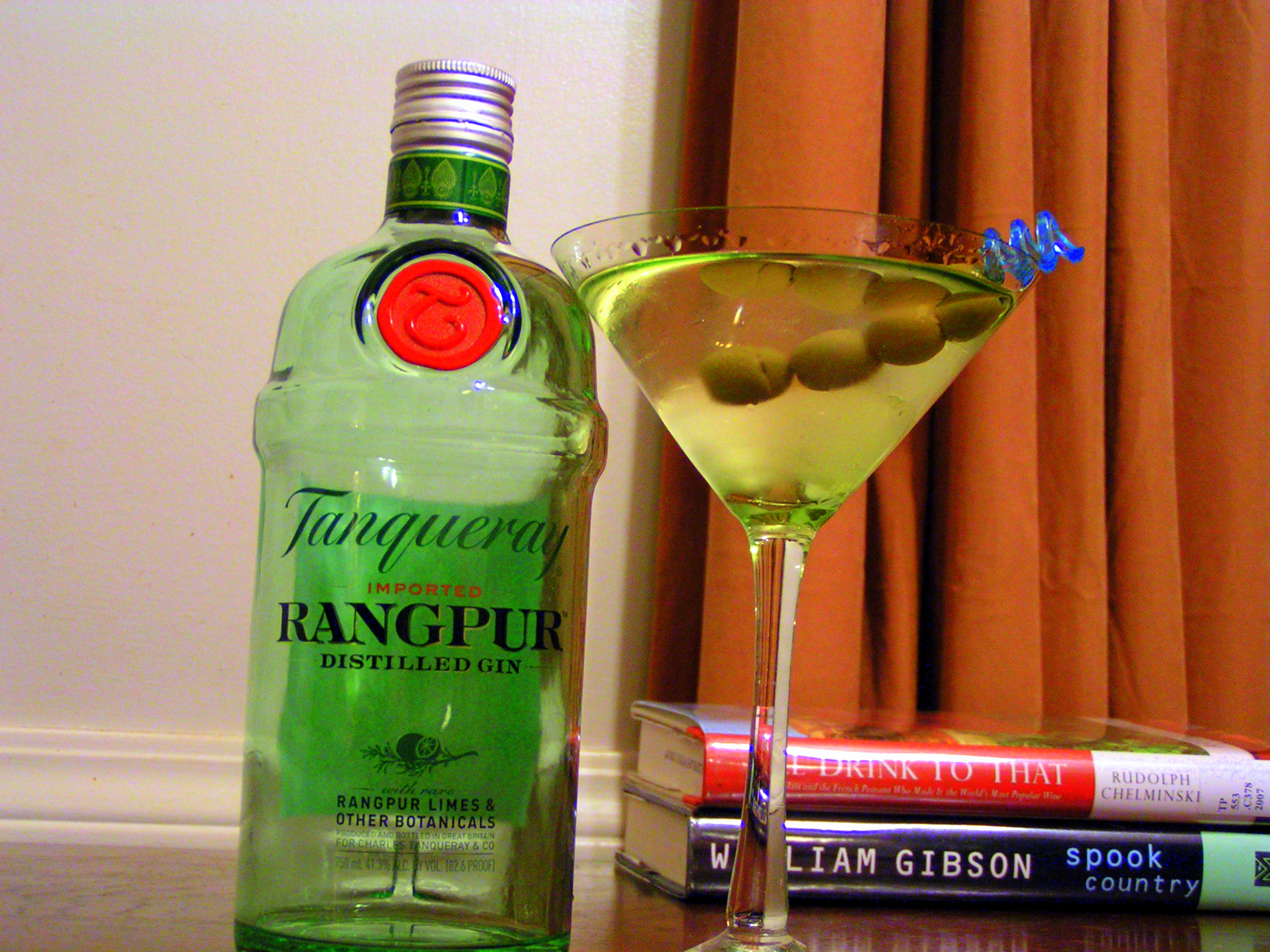
A bottle of Tanqueray Rangpur gin

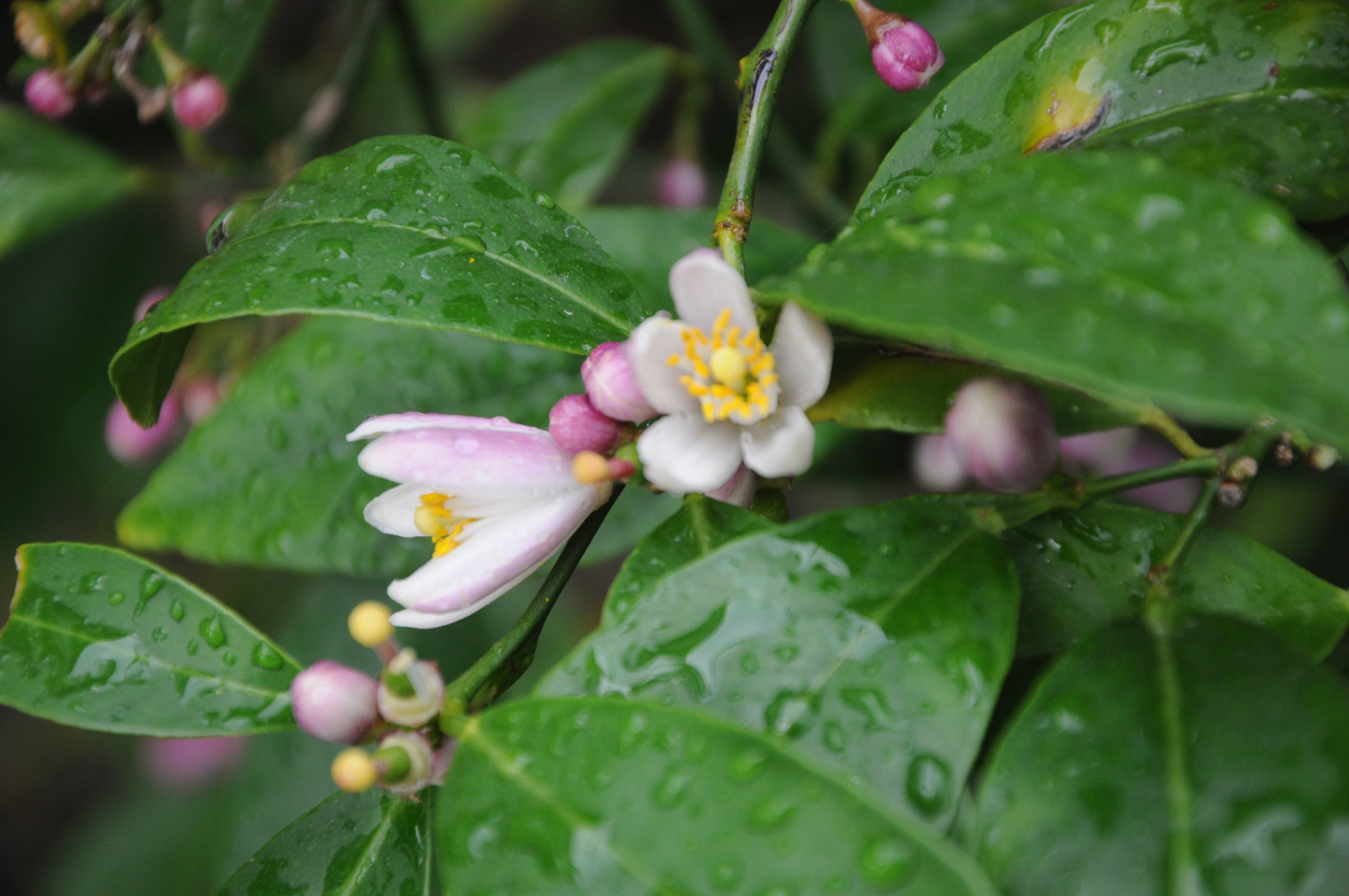
Citrus × limonia - Rangpur, flower and foliage

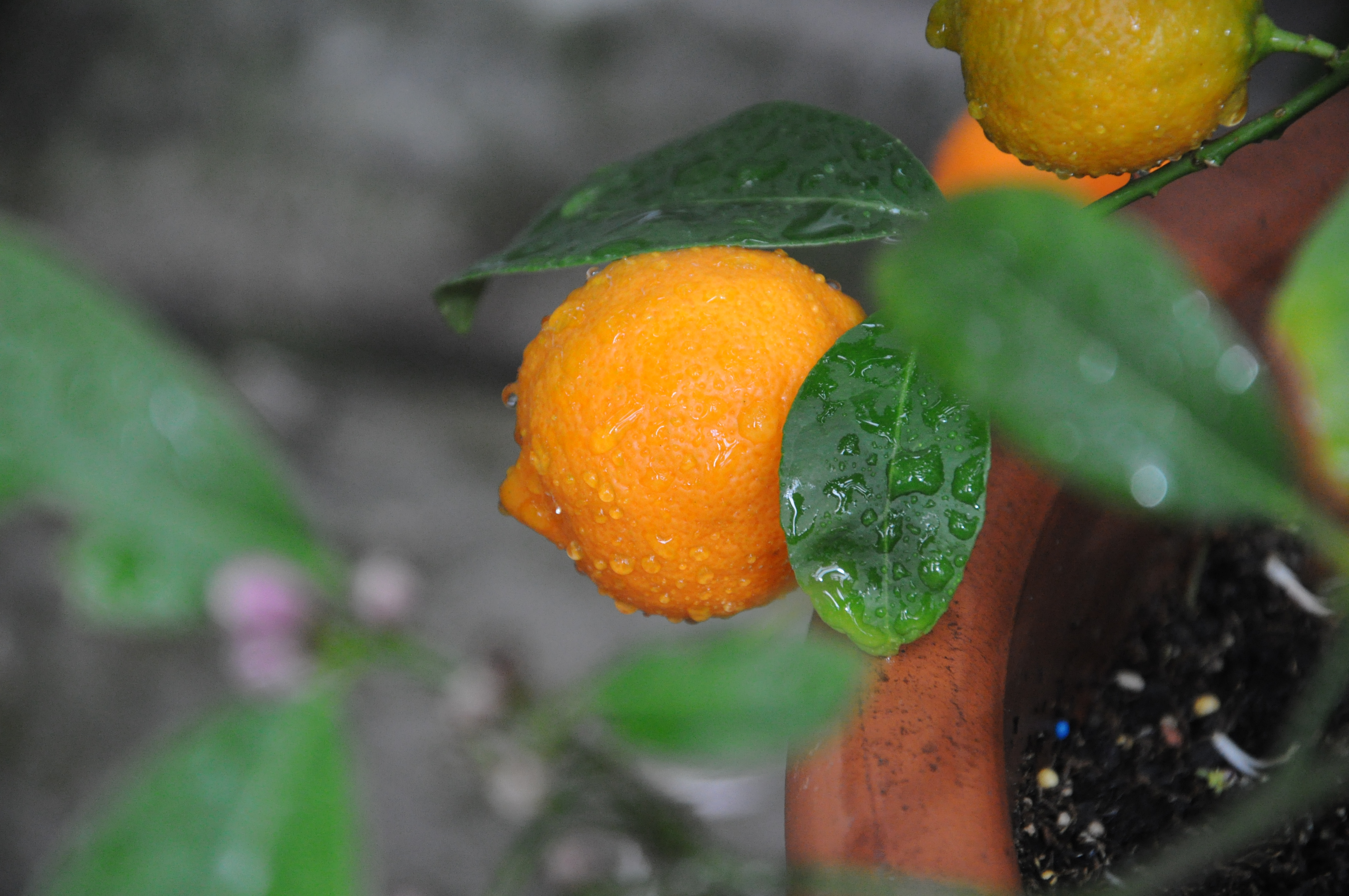
Citrus × limonia - Rangpur, fruit and foliage

== See also ==
- Calamansi
