= Haruka (citrus) =

Citrus fruit

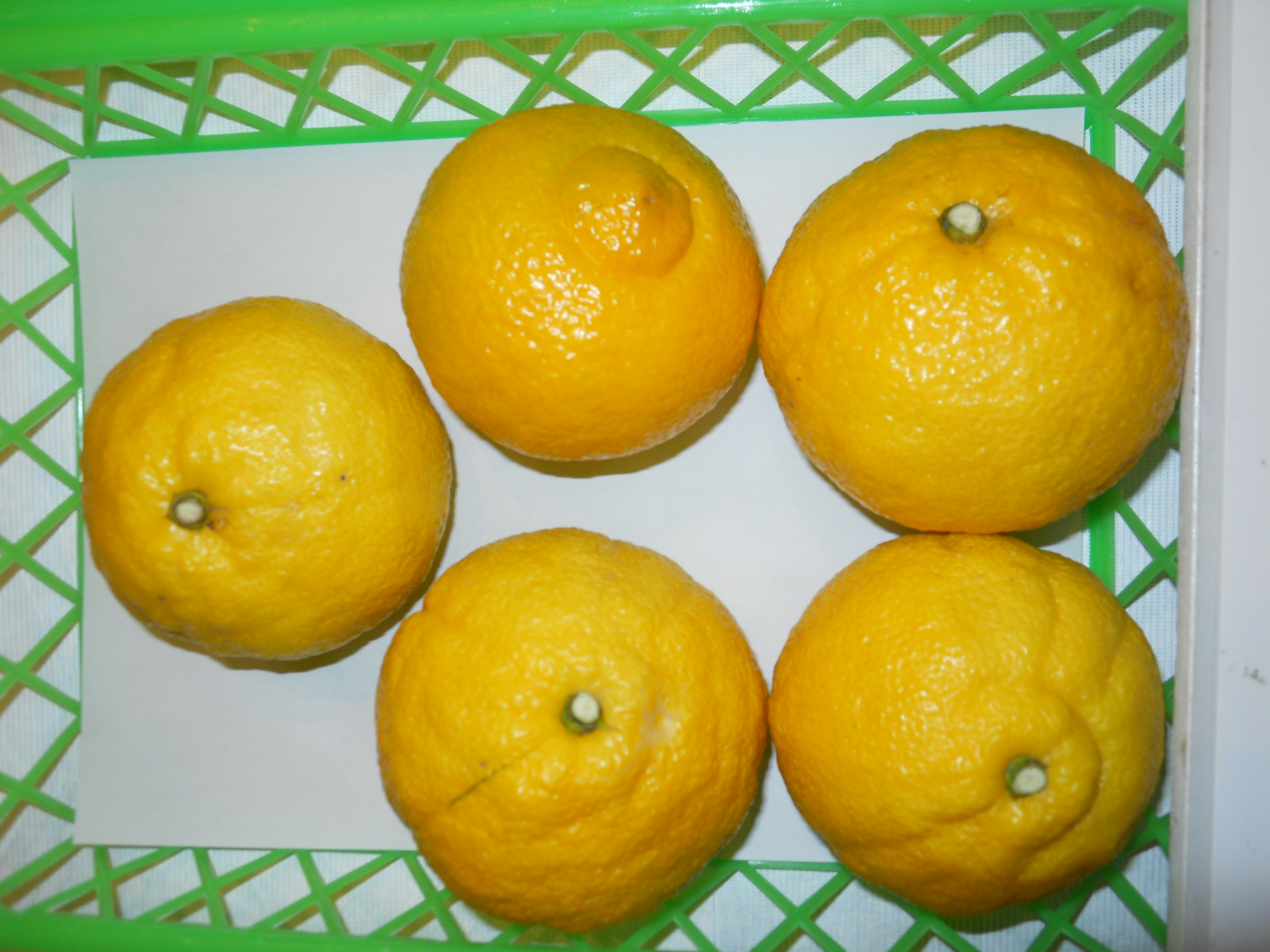
- Haruka citrus fruits
- Genus: Citrus
- Species: Citrus tamurana
- Hybrid parentage: Hyuganatsu × natsudaidai
- Cultivar: Haruka
- Origin: Fukuoka Prefecture, Japan

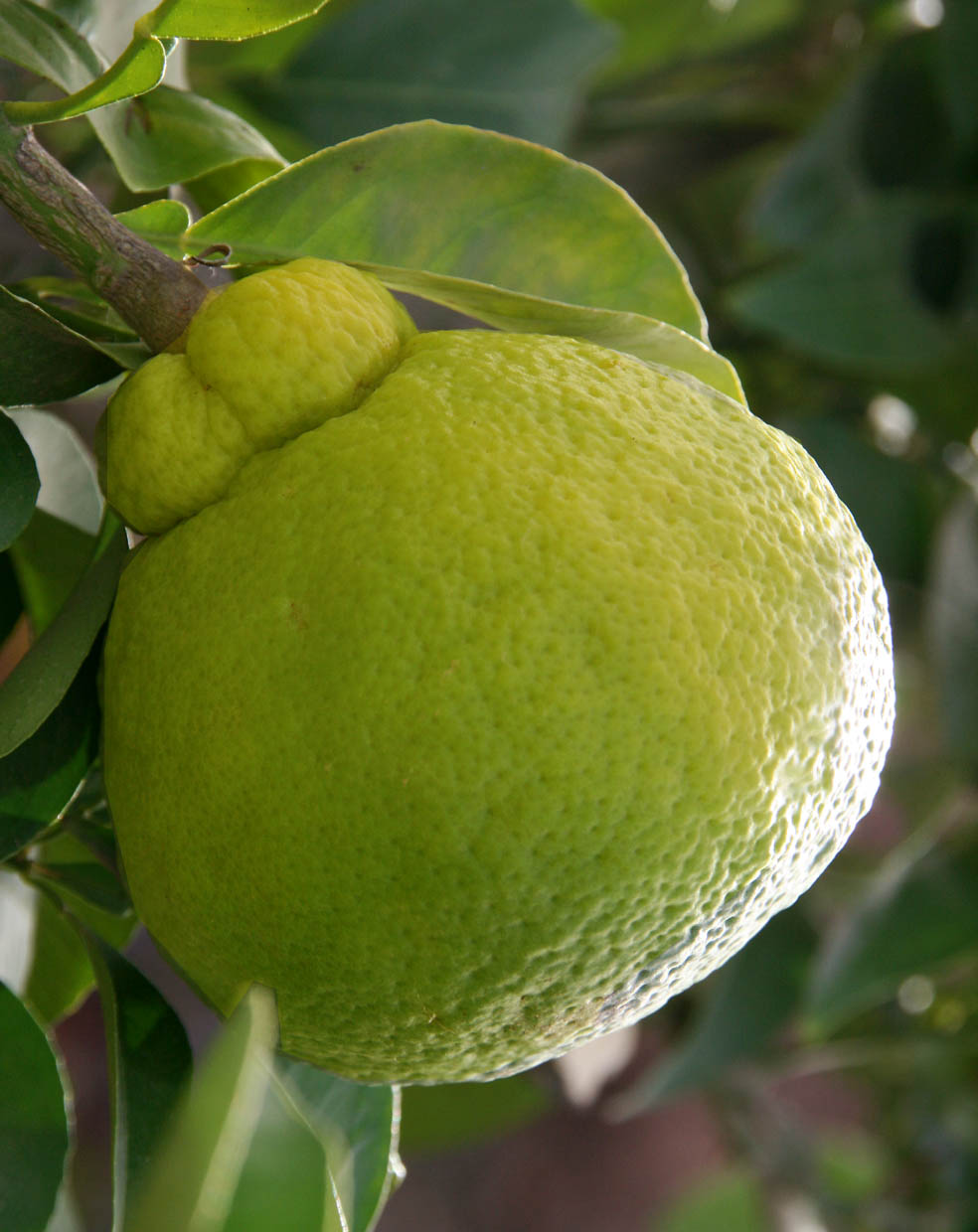
Unripe fruit on tree

Haruka (Citrus tamurana × natsudaidai) is a Citrus cultivar grown in Japan and the Korean Peninsula.

== Genetics and origin ==
In 1980, Tokuo Ishii of Nijo-machi, Itoshima-gun (now Itoshima City), Fukuoka Prefecture, discovered a natural hybrid seedling of "Hyuganatsu" in his garden, which was grafted in 1982 and bore fruit for the first time in 1986. The variety was registered on October 15, 1996. The name of the variety when it was applied for registration was "Enka". Initially thought to be a natural mutation of the hyuganatsu (Citrus tamurana), it is now inferred that the Haruka is a hybrid between the hyuganatsu and natsudaidai (Citrus natsudaidai), with the hyuganatsu being the seed parent and the natsudaidai being the pollen parent.

The 2009 harvest of the fruit in Japan was approximately 1,258 tons, of which 45% came from Ehime Prefecture, 25% from Nagasaki Prefecture, and 21% from Hiroshima Prefecture.

== Description ==
The fruit is small to medium in size (around the size of an orange) and can be round, oblate, or pyriform in shape. It weighs around 200 grams (0.44 pounds). The rind is moderately thick (around the thickness of an orange) and is yellow in color; it is smooth but porous and is fragrant. It is reportedly difficult to peel by hand. The flesh is bright yellow in color and is separated into 10–11 segments by thin membranes. It is moderately seedy. There is a circular protrusion on the non-stem end and there is sometimes a nipple at the stem end. The flavor is said to be very sweet but rather mild. Like the hyuganatsu, the spongy, white pith is sweet and edible. It is most commonly eaten raw and is usually eaten with the pith intact. The sugar content is roughly 13 °Bx and acidity is low. It ripens from late winter to spring and keeps for 1–3 weeks in a refrigerator.

== Nutrition ==
Haruka is rich in vitamin A and C, and contains smaller amounts of vitamin B1 and beta-carotene.

== Distribution ==
It is cultivated in southern Japan, mainly in Ehime, Hiroshima and Nagasaki prefectures. It is sold in markets in Japan and is exported to Singapore, Taiwan, and Hong Kong.

== Confectionery products ==
A flavor of the Japanese candy Puccho is based on the haruka citrus fruit.

== See also ==
- Japanese citrus
- List of citrus fruits
