= Shonan Gold =

Citrus fruit and plant

Shonan Gold (湘南ゴールド)
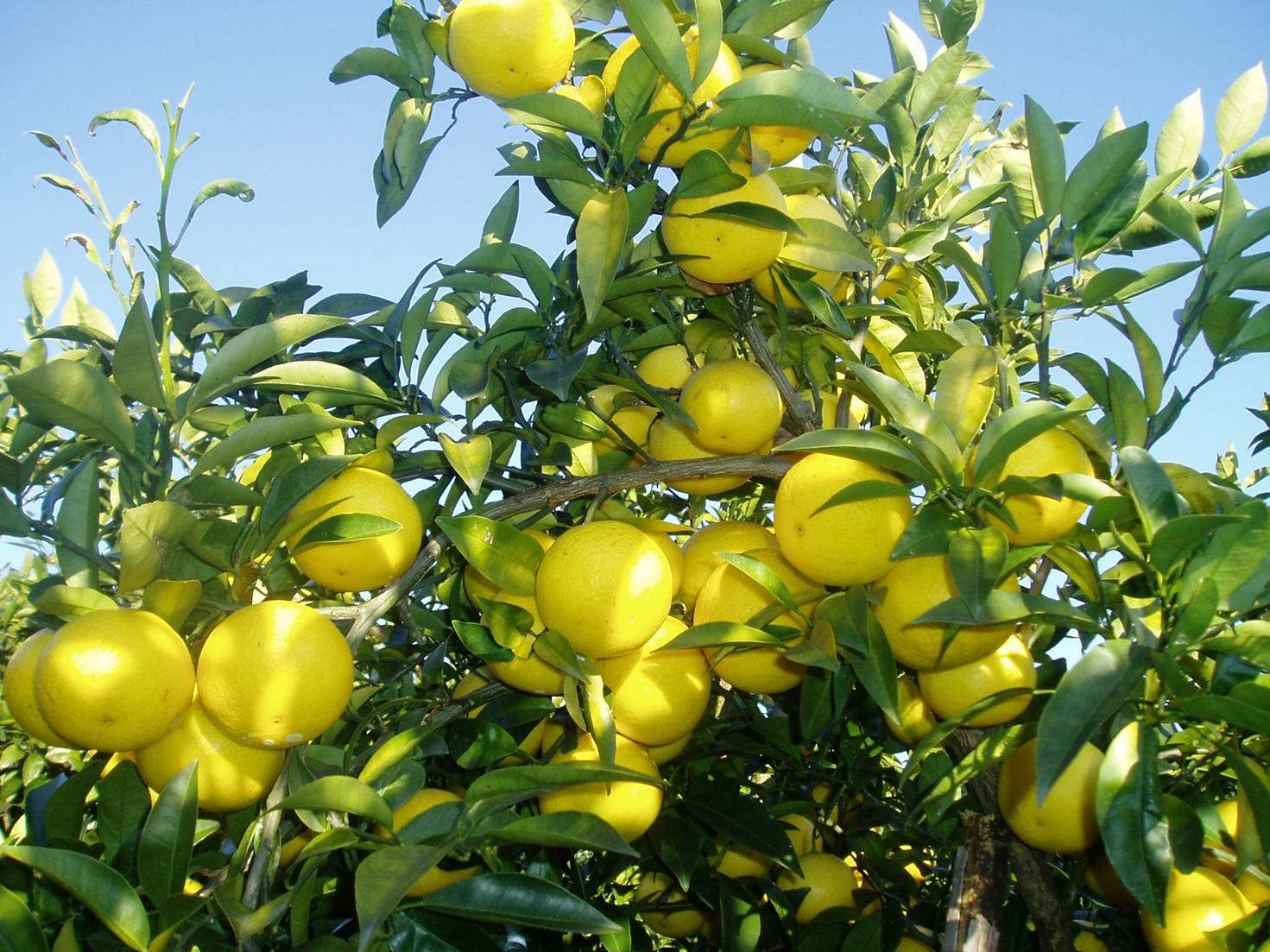
- Hybrid parentage: Citrus flaviculpus hort. ex Tanaka (Ōgonkan) × Citrus unshiu (Swingle) Marcow. cv. Imamura unshiu
- Cultivar: Shōnan Gold
- Origin: Kanagawa Agricultural Technology Center (神奈川県農業技術センター), Japan

Shonan Gold (湘南ゴールド) is a hybrid Japanese citrus, with a characteristic "golden" bright yellow color.

Though not completely seedless, the seeds are few in number. The yellowness is inherited from its mother plant (seed parent), a small-sized variety known as Ōgonkan or "Golden Orange", which has been crossed with the Imamura unshiu variety of satsuma orange for size and other desired traits. The cultivar was developed by an agricultural experiment station run by the Kanagawa Prefecture.

== History ==
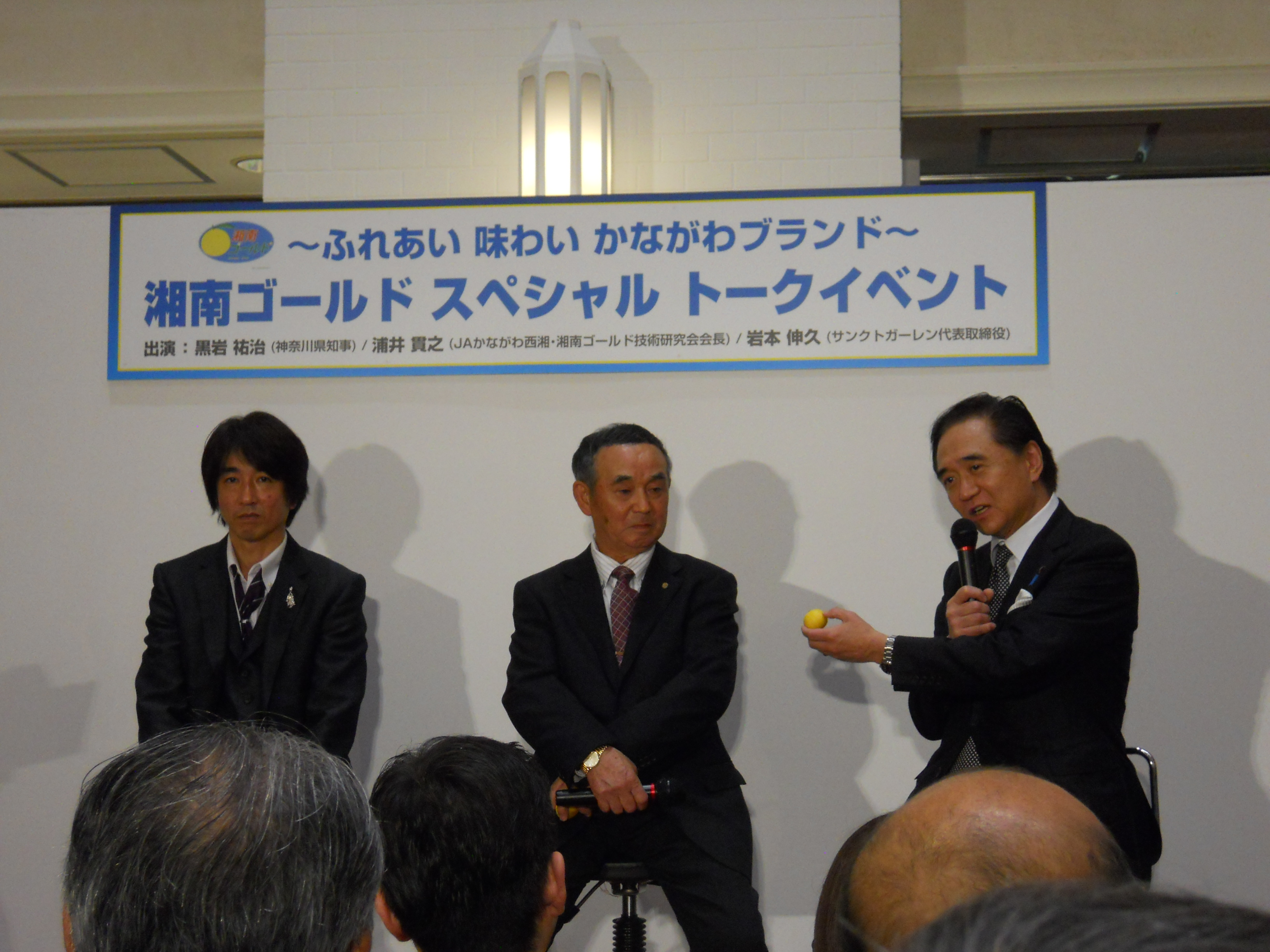
2015 Shōnan Gold Special Talk Event, featuring Iwamoto Nobuhisa, owner of Sankt Gallen Brewery, Urai Tsurayuki, JA Kanagawa Seisho Agricultural Cooperative Association and Kuroiwa Yūji, Governor of Kanagawa Prefecture

Shōnan gold was first cultivated in 1988, by hybrid crossing the Citrus flaviculpus (Ōgonkan (黄金柑, "Golden Orange")) with Citrus unshiu cv. Imamura unshiu (今村温州) (a variety of Satsuma orange). It is thought to be a nucellar seedling of the mother plant Ōgonkan.

The cultivation was first conducted at the Kanagawa Agricultural Research Institute, Nebukawa Experiment Station (神奈川県農業総合研究所根府川試験場) in the city of Odawara, although the station has since been bureaucratically reorganized as the Nebukawas Sub-Office, under the Ashigara-ku Office, Kanagawa Agricultural Technology Center (神奈川県農業技術センター足柄地区事務所根府川分室). Further seed selection and propagation was continued until the 12th year (1999) to establish stability of characteristics. The hybrid was registered with the name "Shōnan Gold" (registration number 11469) at Japan's Ministry of Agriculture, Forestry and Fisheries (MAFF) in 2003, and the first harvest took place that same year. Shipment started in 2006 (FY2005) with about 2.0 metric tons officially entering the market, or about 450 kg according to a newspaper coverage. (Note: The wide margin in numbers cannot be accounted for by fresh fruit vs. total, since the government statistics also has a breakdown column for fruits shipped as processed goods.)

== Description ==
The sphere-shaped fruit averages about 77 g (2.72 oz) each in weight and the rind or peel is yellow. The flesh or pulp is tender, succulent, and sweet, with sugar concentration typically 11–12 °Bx (i.e. 11–12% by mass). It is fragrant like the Ōgonkan, but is smoother-skinned and easier to peel by hand. The fruit ripens during April and retains excellent flavor until May, which exactly targets the months when the unshū (satsuma) oranges run scarce in the Japanese market.

=== Cultivation ===
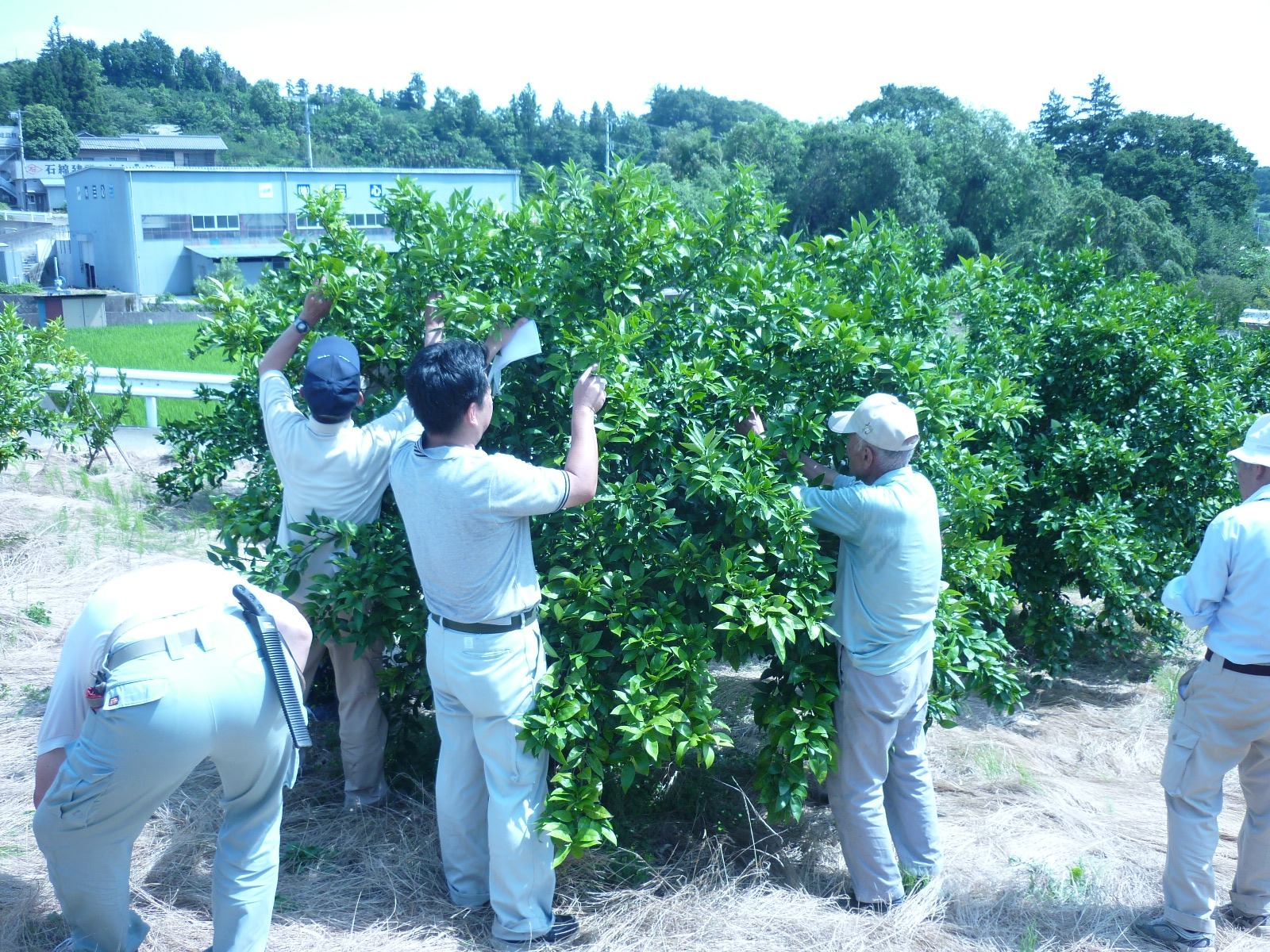
The fruit-thinning symposium held by Kanagawa Agricultural Technology Center and the growers

The young sapling is thorny and grows upright, but as it ages, it loses its thorns and begins to spread its limbs laterally. To encourage earlier fruiting, it is important to train the branches on the young tree so they fan out. Fruiting is bountiful, but has alternate year bearing (biennial bearing) tendencies.

The growers (the JA-kanagawaseisho (かながわ西湘農業協同組合), i.e., the Japan Agricultural Cooperatives of the "West Shōnan" region of Kanagawa) and the agency (Kanagawa Agricultural Technology Center) jointly held a symposium on the proper method of fruit thinning and planted a test tree, to continue to develop improved cultivation techniques and quality.

=== Crop yields ===
The history of planted acreage, annual yields, and shipments, according to the agriculture ministry data are tabulated below.

In statistics up to 2010, Kanagawa prefecture accounted for 100% of Shonan Gold production in Japan. (Note: As of Feb-2013, the latest available online at www.e-stat.go.jp site is FY2010 data) The major producers are the city of Odawara and the town of Yugawara.

Shōnan Gold crop yields
FY	Acreage	Crop yields	Shipments
2005	0.9 ha	2.2 t	2.0 t
2006	0.9 ha	2.2 t	2.0 t
2007	2.7 ha	8.8 t	8.0 t
2008	3.7 ha	11.0 t	10.0 t
2009	3.9 ha	31.1 t	30.0 t
2009	3.9 ha	31.1 t	30.0 t
2010	5.7 ha	41.6 t	40.0 t

The year is fiscal year, so the first shipment, given as FY2005 in the above data, really occurred in 2006. According to an Asahi Shimbun online edition, the first shipment amounted only to 450 kg (990 lb).

== Gallery ==
Original propagating stock tree

Blooming

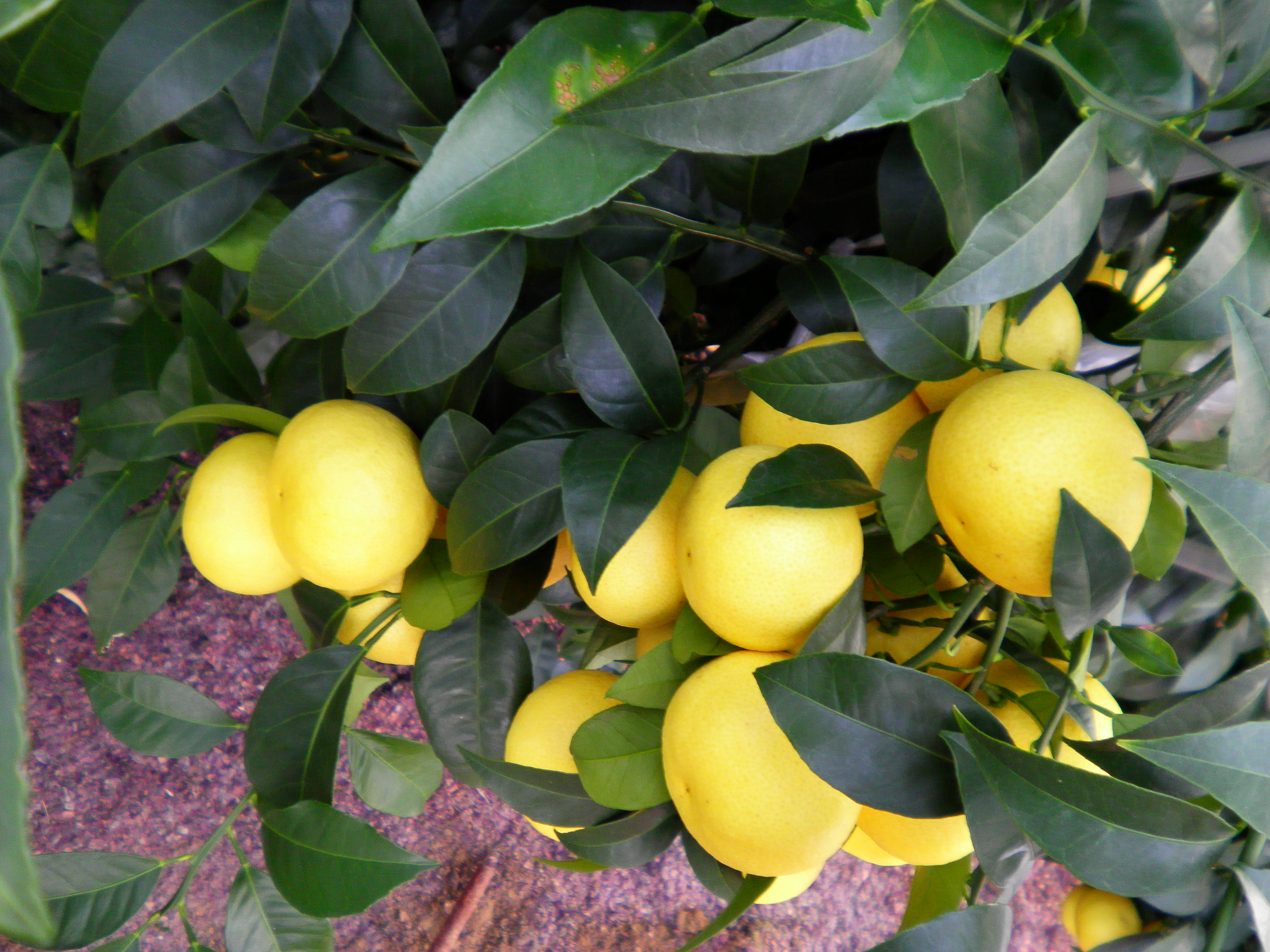
Fruit

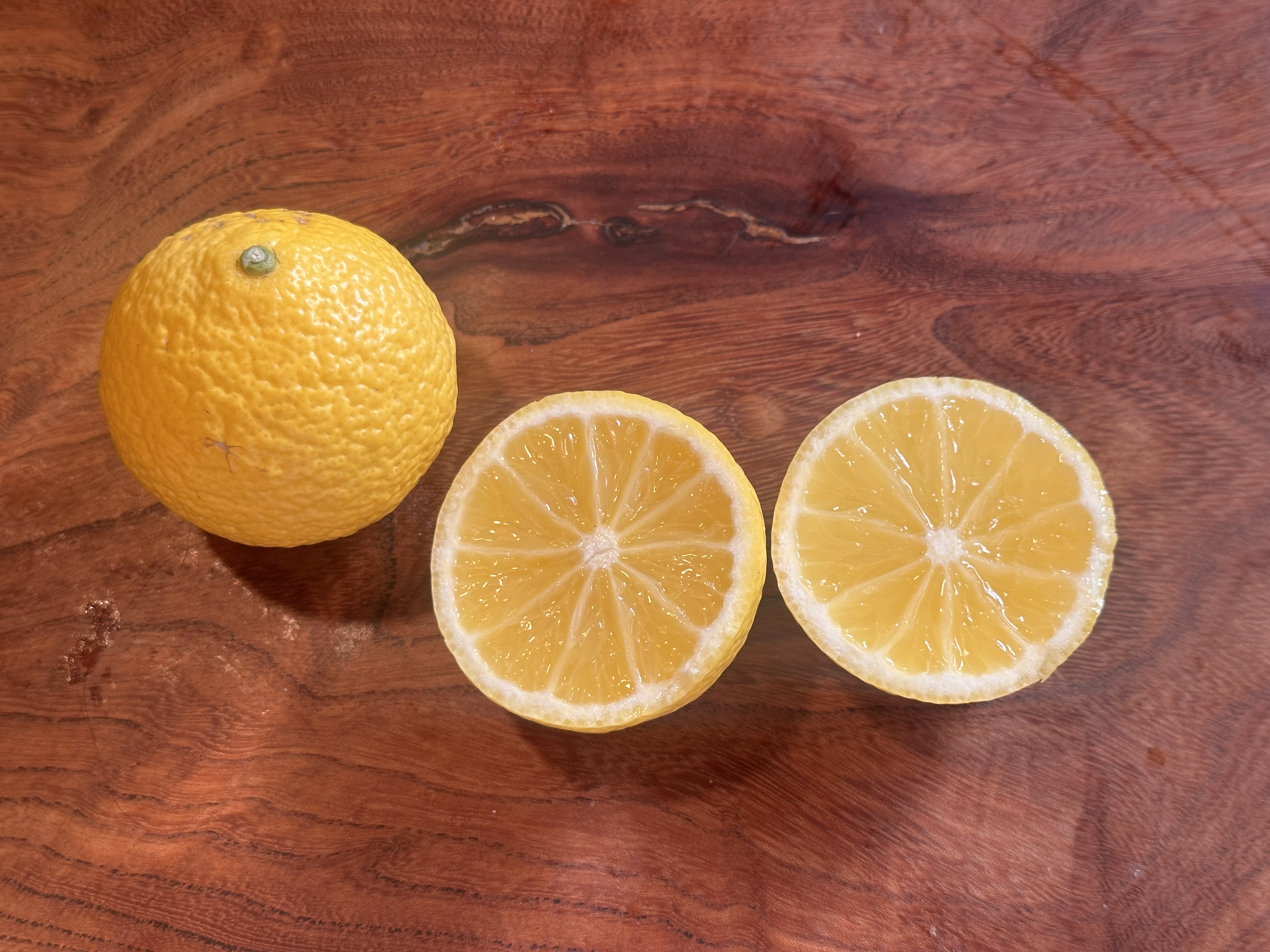
Sliced open

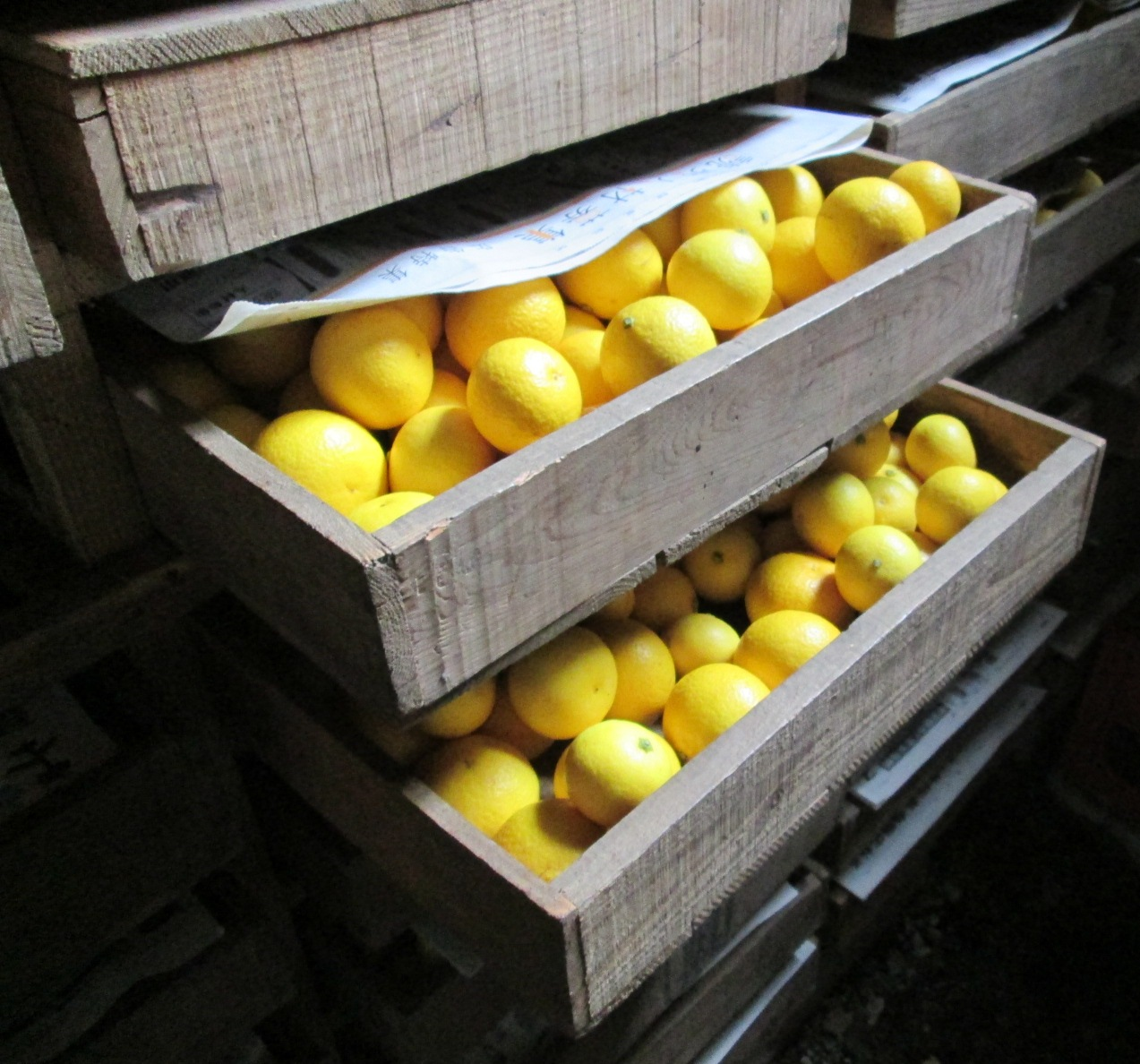
Packing

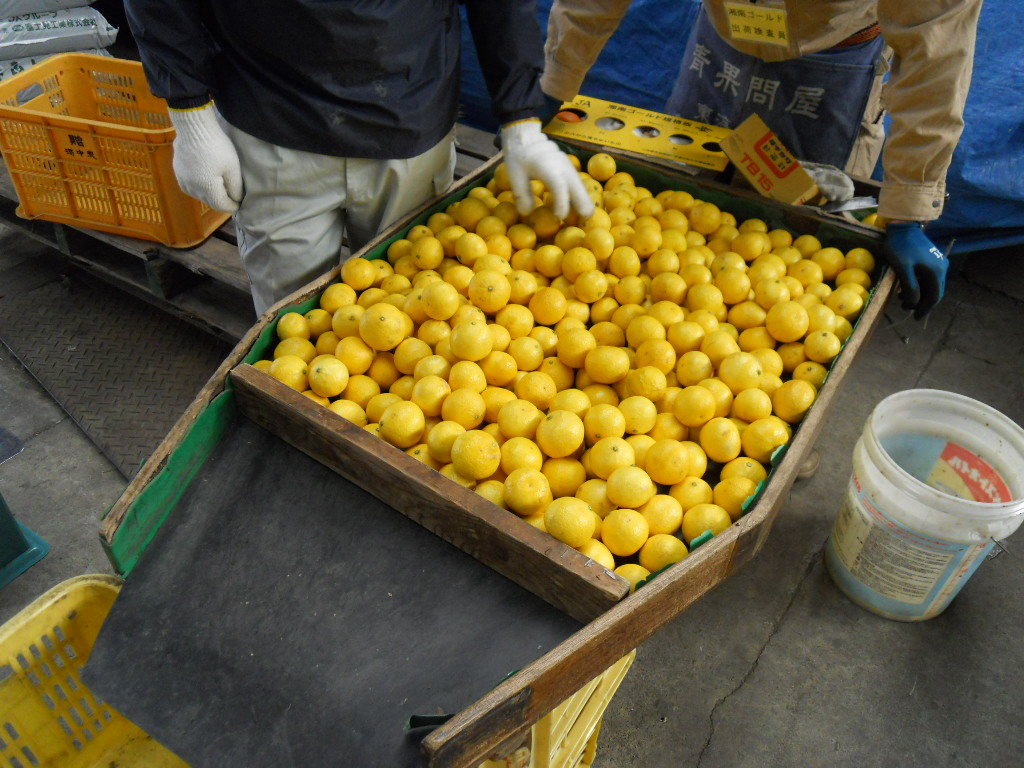
Sorting
