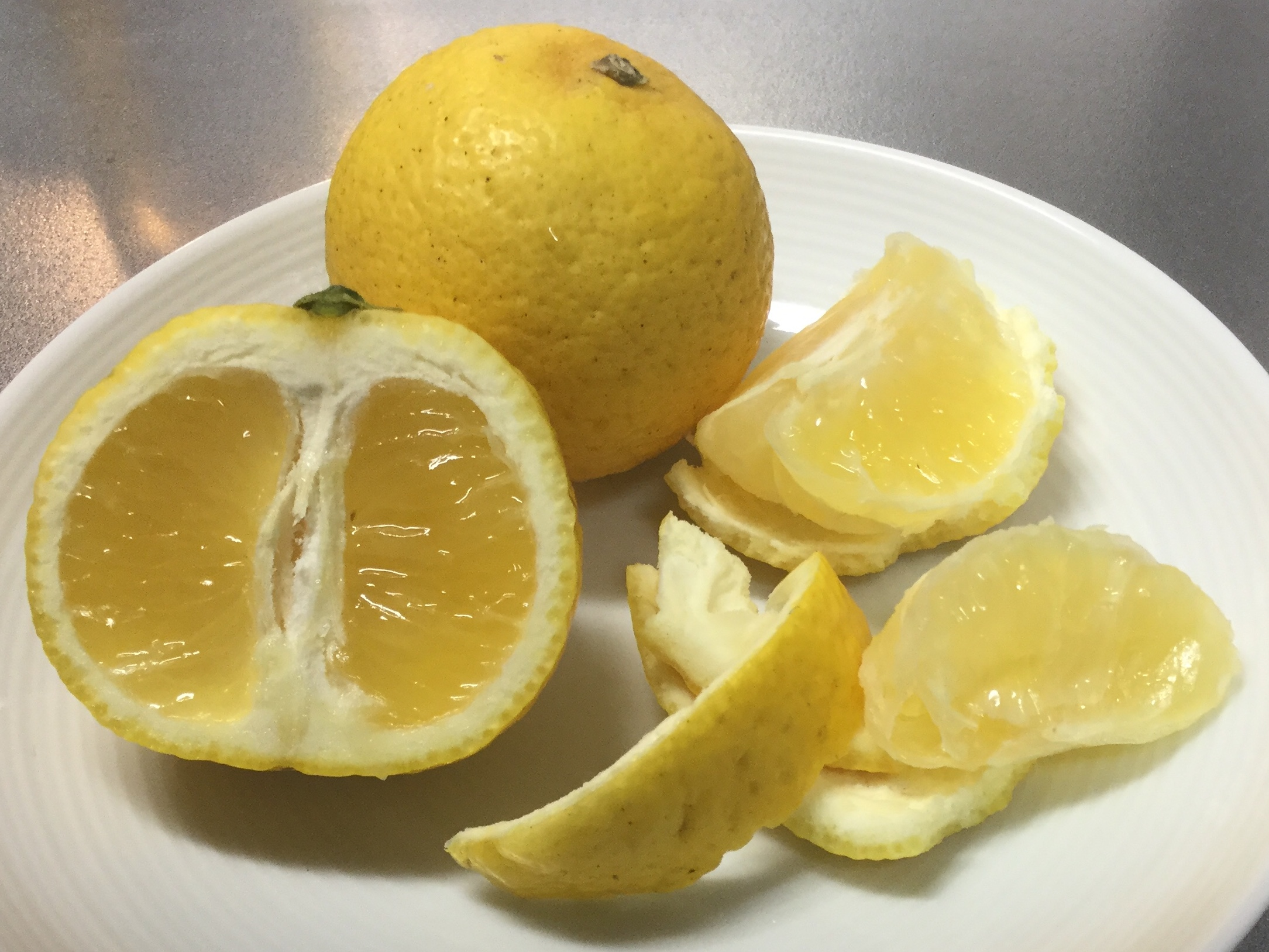
- Ōgonkan grown in Ehime Prefecture

Scientific classification
- Kingdom: Plantae
- Clade: Tracheophytes
- Clade: Angiosperms
- Clade: Eudicots
- Clade: Rosids
- Order: Sapindales
- Family: Rutaceae
- Genus: Citrus
- Species: C. flaviculpus

Binomial name
- Citrus flaviculpus hort. ex. Tanaka

= Ōgonkan =

Ki-mikan (黄蜜柑) or Ōgonkan (黄金柑)

Citrus fruit and plant

Ōgonkan (黄金柑, "golden citrus") or Ki-mikan (黄蜜柑, "yellow mikan") are the common names for a small sized variety of Japanese citrus, whose rind is of a characteristic "golden" bright yellow color.

The variety has been published as the species Citrus flaviculpus by Chōzaburō Tanaka in his 160-species scheme, but this is considered an effort of a "splitter", as opposed to Swingle's classification system which is generally preferred in the West.

Alternate spellings (romanizations) include "Ougonkan" or "Ogon-kan". It has also been called "Golden orange" in Kanagawa Prefecture.

== History ==
The variety has long been known in Kagoshima Prefecture as Ki-mikan (黄蜜柑, "yellow mikan") but, precise origins are unknown.

According to one assertion, it has been known in Higashi-ichiki-chō (ja) and its neighborhood (now Hioki, Kagoshima) since the Meiji Period. Anecdotally in this Hioki area, the variety is said to have been either introduced by the Jesuit Francisco de Xavier, or brought back from the Korean Peninsula during Hideyoshi's invasions of Korea in the late 16th century. It has been suggested that the name "Ōgonkan" was dubbed by Harutarō Muramatsu (村松春太郎) who introduced the variety to Ehime Prefecture, but this too is poorly documented.

== Fruit ==
The small fruit has a diameter of 4 to 5 cm (1.6 to 2.0 in), weighing 60 to 80 g (2.1 to 2.8 oz). The rind, which is bright yellow, can be peeled by hand but with difficulty. It has a distinct fragrance, and a considerably sweet flavour, with some balancing acidity. The fruit is harvested from February to April. Seedless (self-incompatibility) traits have been observed.

Its fragrance is similar to the Hyuganatsu, a larger citrus that is also bright yellow, but somewhat sweeter by comparison. Like the Hyuganatsu, the white pith (albedo) may be eaten.

The rind's cold-pressed oil has been studied for fragrance factors, and was found to contain limonene (roughly 80%), followed by the monoterpene Gamma-terpinene (10%), trans beta-farnesene, and myrcene, showing similarity to Hyuganatsu's peel profile, though with quantitative differences in concentrations.

== Regional production ==
According to government (MAFF) statistics for FY2010, crop yield of the Ōgonkan totaled 137.3 t (metric tons) in all of Japan, with 108.2 t shipped to market, none of it classed as processed goods (i.e., juices, etc.) in the statistics. Kanagawa Prefecture produced 93.4 t, representing 68% of the national total, followed by Shizuoka Prefecture with 25.0 t (18%), Ehime Prefecture with 13.9 t, and Kōchi Prefecture with 5.0 t. Major cultivating areas listed are Odawara and Yugawara-cho (Kanagawa pref.), Numazu, Shizuoka, Uwajima, Seiyo, Imabari (Ehime pref.), and Kōnan, Kōchi.

== Hybrid crossing ==
The Ōgonkan was the pollinating parent for the hybrid cultivar Hime-Koharu (媛小春) developed by Ehime Prefecture, and was the seed parent of Shonan Gold developed by Kanagawa Prefecture.

== See also ==
- Citrus unshiu (Mikan)
