= Satsuma, Texas =

Unincorporated area in Texas, US

Coordinates: 29°54′12″N 95°36′12″W

Satsuma (also Ashford and Thompson Switch) is an area in northern unincorporated Harris County, Texas, United States.

Satsuma is located along U.S. Route 290, southeast of the community of Cypress and northwest of the city of Jersey Village. It was named for the groves of Satsuma mandarin oranges that were to be planted on site. Despite the presence of oil, the town never developed beyond the early 1900s.

== Education ==
Cypress-Fairbanks Independent School District operates schools serving Satsuma.

== History ==
The main intersection of roads near Satsuma are SH 290 and SH 6 (to the south)/FM 1960 (to the north). In the near past, the section of road south of that intersection was renamed SH6 from its former name, FM 1960. From the year 1960 until the road was renamed, the entire north/northeast to south road was known as FM 1960. Some remember, however, before the paving and straightening of the route between Addicks (intersection of I-10 and SH 6 now) and Satsuma (intersection of SH 290/FM 1960 and SH 6), when this was a winding, dirt/gravel road known as Jackrabbit Road. And, a portion of Jackrabbit Road—the original road from Hempstead Highway (SH 290) to SH 90 (I-10) on this west side of Houston—still remains: it begins just south of the intersection of SH 290 and SH 6/FM 1960W and continues straight south for a couple of miles. This section of the road is straight. Before 1960, it turned west where it now deadends and continued west for a bit, turned south again, meandering through the countryside until it arrived at Addicks.
