= Kawachi bankan =

Citrus fruit

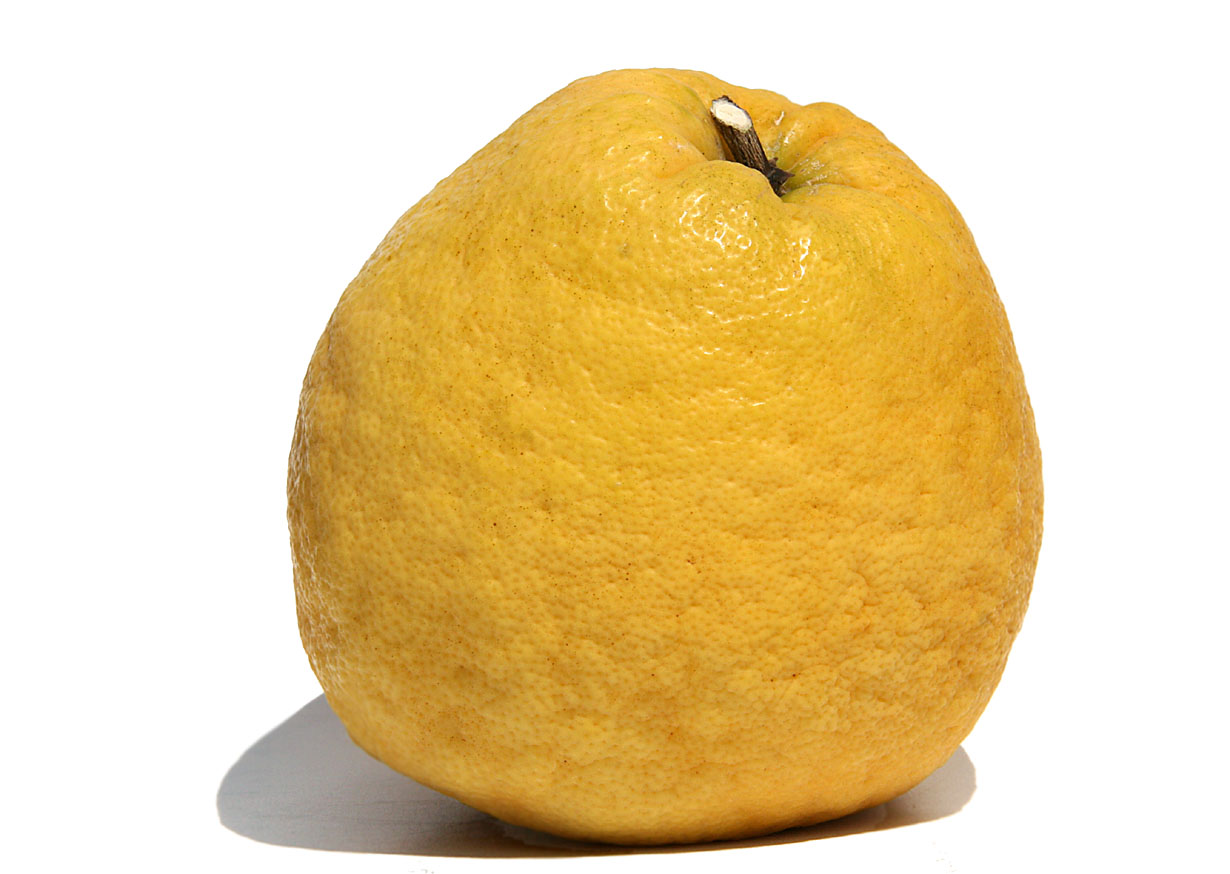
- Genus: Citrus
- Species: Citrus kawachiensis or Citrus maxima
- Cultivar: Kawachi bankan
- Origin: Kumamoto Prefecture, Japan

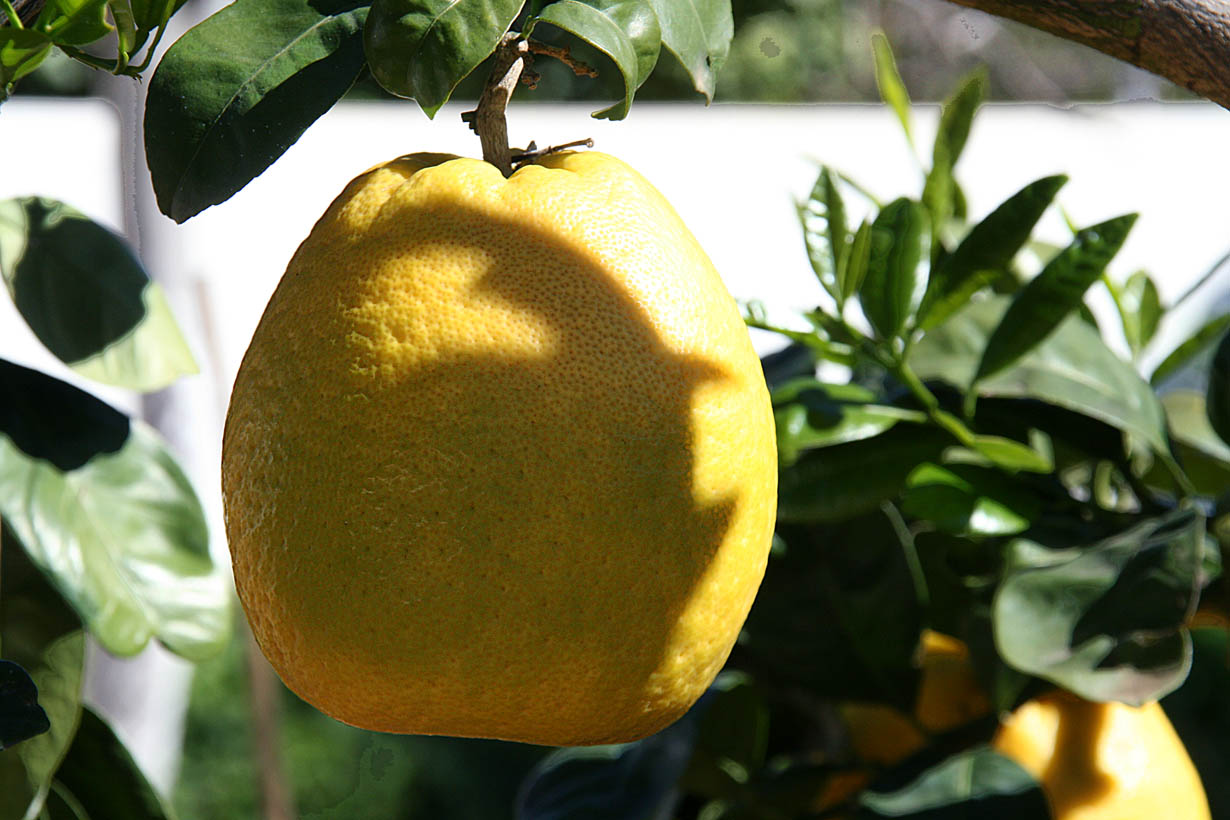
Kawachi bankan fruit on tree

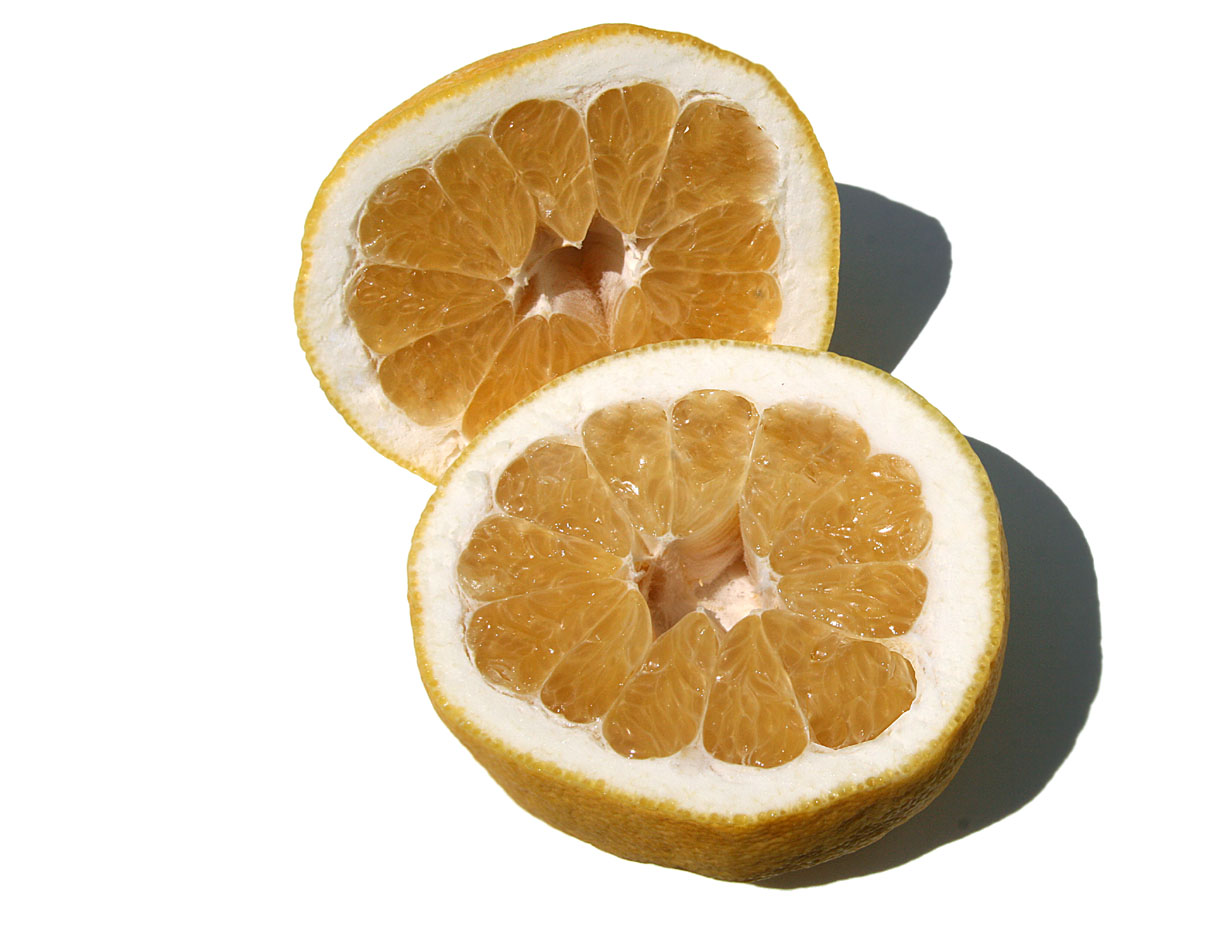
Slices of the Kawachi bankan fruit

Kawachi bankan (Citrus kawachiensis), also called Mishokan and Uwa Gold, is a Citrus hybrid cultivated for its edible fruit.

== Genetics ==
Two varieties of Kawachi bankan have been identified: one, a hybrid between the ujukitsu (seed parent, Citrus ujukitsu) and an unidentified species (pollen parent), and the other, a hybrid between the yuge-hyoukan (seed parent, Citrus yuge-hyokan) and an unidentified species (pollen parent).

== Distribution ==
It originated and is grown in Japan and is also grown in the United States.

== Description ==
The Kawachi bankan was first discovered in Kumamoto Prefecture in 1910. Since the 1980s, the acreage growing this fruit has been increasing. The fruits are large, normally weighing 0.6–1.1 pounds (270–500 grams) and are slightly conical in shape, with most having a nipple at the stem end. They contain few seeds. The rind is thick, somewhat pebbly, and yellow in color; the flesh is also yellow. The flavor is said to be sweet and slightly acidic, and the fruit is very juicy. The tree is densely branched and the leaves are elliptic in shape. The fruit matures late and is shipped at the end of May in Japan.

== Chemistry ==
The peel of the Kawachi bankan fruit contains many biologically active substances including naringin, narirutin, auraptene, and 3,5,6,7,8,3',4'-heptamethoxyflavone. The dried powder of the peel exerts anti-inflammatory and neuroprotective effects against aging in the brain of mice and ameliorates microglial activation, tau hyperphosphorylation, and suppression of neurogenesis in the hippocampus of senescence-accelerated mice. It also ameliorates DSS-induced body weight loss, colon shortening, increased expression of pro-inflammatory cytokines, and decreased expression of colonic tight junctions in colitic mice.

== Confectionery products ==
A limited-edition flavor of the Japanese candy Hi-Chew is based on the Kawachi bankan fruit.

== See also ==
- List of citrus fruits
- Japanese citrus
