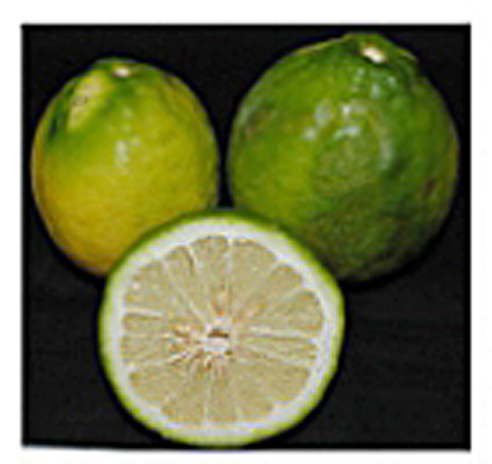
- Fruit

Scientific classification
- Kingdom: Plantae
- Clade: Tracheophytes
- Clade: Angiosperms
- Clade: Eudicots
- Clade: Rosids
- Order: Sapindales
- Family: Rutaceae
- Genus: Citrus
- Species: C. assamensis

Binomial name
- Citrus assamensis R.M.Dutta & Bhattacharya

= Citrus assamensis =

Species of flowering plant

Citrus assamensis, the adajamir or ginger lime, is a species of flowering plant in the family Rutaceae, native to Assam and Bangladesh. It is mainly cultivated in the Sylhet Region. It is locally cultivated for its fruit, which give a very sour juice with an aroma reminiscent of ginger or eucalyptus.

== Culinary use ==
In the Sylhet Region the fruit is used to make tenga/khatta, and is known as adalebur tenga/khatta. Adajamiror khatta is normally cooked with fish.
