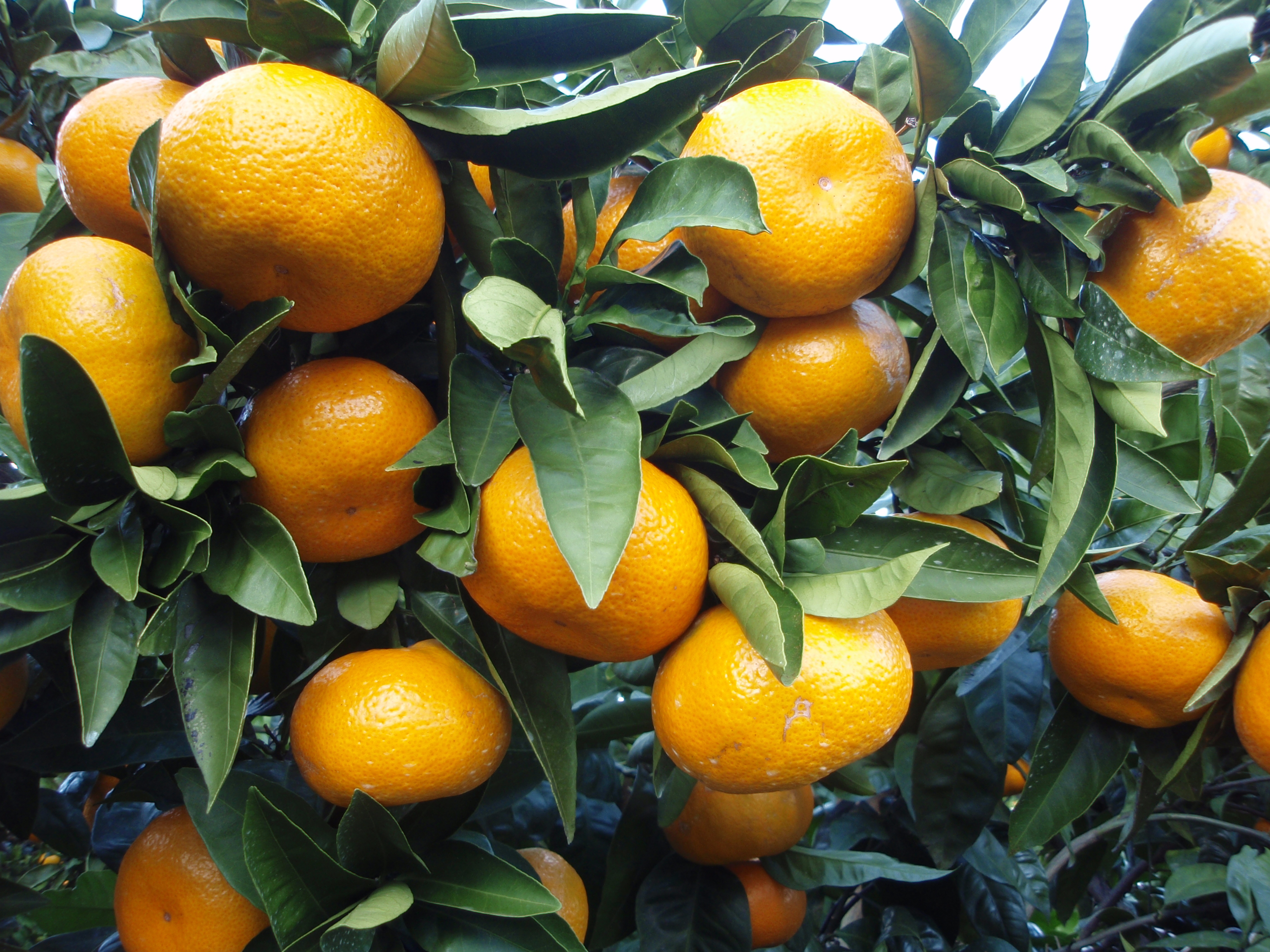

Scientific classification
- Kingdom: Plantae
- Clade: Tracheophytes
- Clade: Angiosperms
- Clade: Eudicots
- Clade: Rosids
- Order: Sapindales
- Family: Rutaceae
- Genus: Citrus
- Species: C. unshiu

Binomial name
- Citrus unshiu (Yu.Tanaka ex Swingle) Marcow.

= Citrus unshiu =

Citrus fruit and plant

Citrus unshiu is a semi-seedless and easy-peeling citrus species, also known as the satsuma mandarin or Japanese mandarin.

== Nomenclature ==
The Chinese name for the fruit is Wenzhou migan (温州蜜柑), which means "Wenzhou honey citrus". The same name is pronounced Unshū mikan (温州蜜柑) in Japanese, which is the origin of the scientific name unshiu. In Japan, the common name mikan usually refers to this species unless otherwise stated.

An alternative Chinese name, wúhé jú (simplified Chinese: 无核橘; traditional Chinese: 無核橘), means "seedless mandarin".

One of the English names for the fruit, satsuma, is derived from the former Satsuma Province in Japan, from which these fruits were first exported to the West.

The Afrikaans name naartjie is also used in South African English. It came originally from the Tamil word nartei, meaning citrus.

== Classification ==
Under the Tanaka classification system, Citrus unshiu is considered a separate species from the mandarin. Under the Swingle system, unshius are considered to be a group of mandarin varieties. Genetic analysis has shown the Satsuma to be a highly inbred mandarin-pomelo hybrid, with 22% of its genome, a larger proportion than seen in most mandarins, coming from pomelo. It arose when a mandarin of the low-pomelo Huanglingmiao or kishumikan variety (placed in C. reticulata by Tanaka) was crossed with a pomelo or pomelo hybrid, then the resulting cultivar was backcrossed with another Huanglingmiao or kishumikan mandarin.

== Characteristics ==
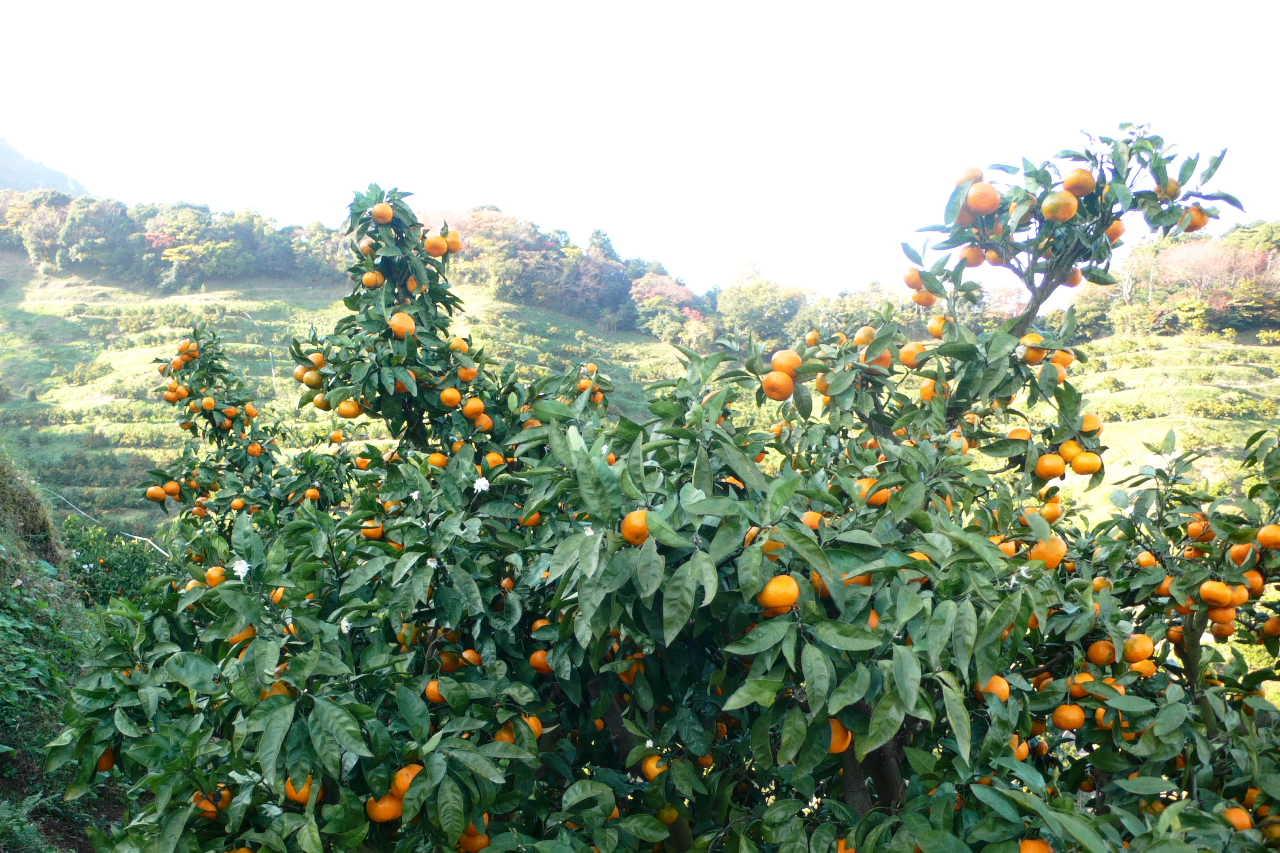
Satsuma orange trees in Izunokuni, Shizuoka Prefecture, Japan

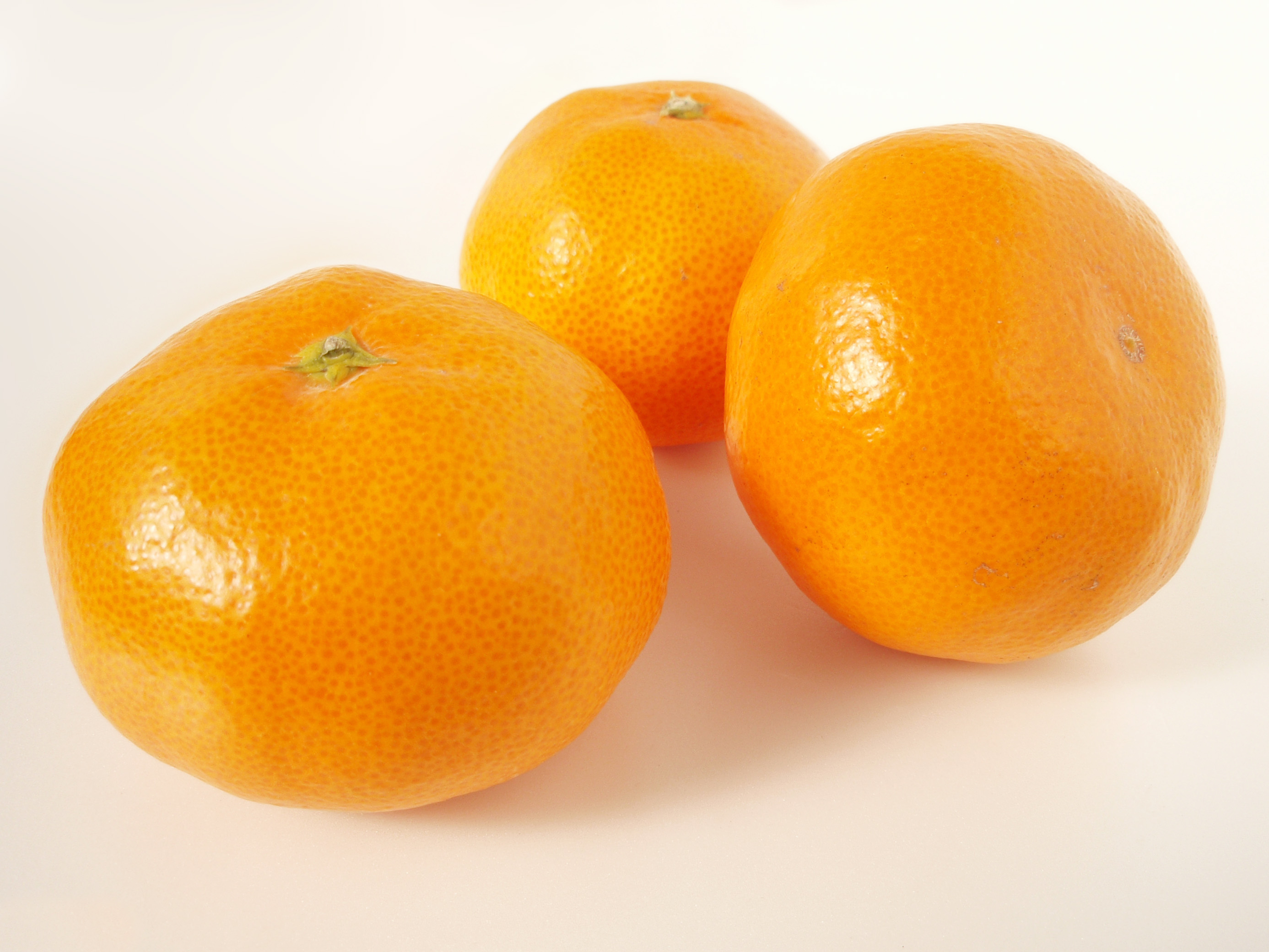
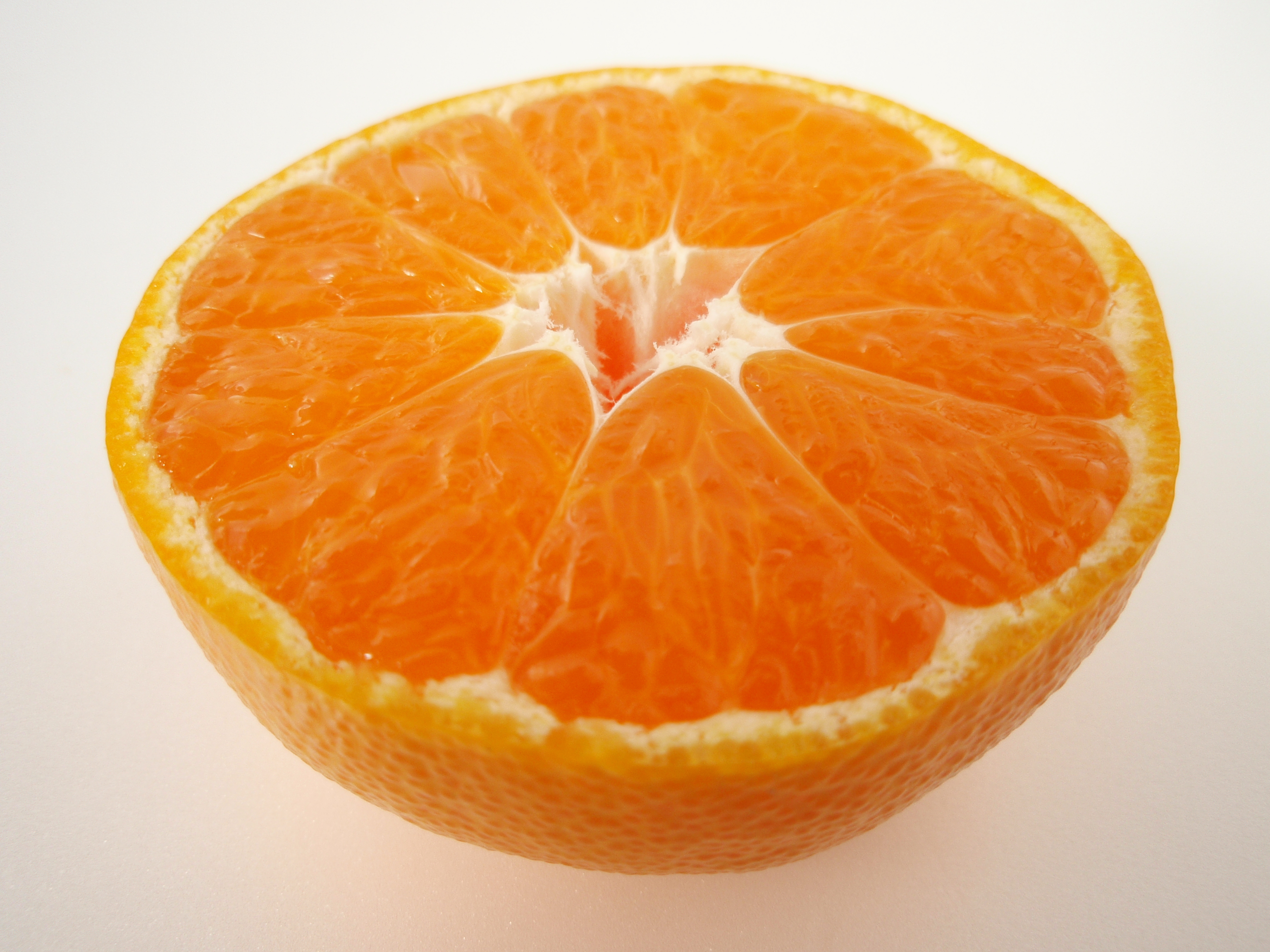
Satsuma orange, whole and halved

Citrus unshiu is one of the sweetest citrus varieties. It is usually seedless, and is about the size of other mandarin oranges (Citrus reticulata). Satsumas are known for their loose, leathery skin; the fruit is very easily peeled in comparison to other citrus fruits. The rind is often smooth to slightly rough with the shape of a medium to small flattened sphere. Satsumas usually have 10 to 12 easily separable segments with tough membranes. The flesh is particularly delicate, and cannot withstand the effects of careless handling. Coloring of the fruit is often dependent on climate; satsumas grown in humid areas may be ripe while the skin is still green while those grown in areas with cool night temperatures may see a brilliant reddish orange skin at peak.

Satsumas are cold-hardy, and when planted in colder locations, the fruit becomes sweeter from the colder temperatures. A mature satsuma tree can survive down to −9 °C (15 °F) or even −11 °C (12 °F) for a few hours. Of the edible citrus varieties, only the kumquat is more cold-hardy. Satsumas rarely have any thorns, an attribute that also makes them popular. They can be grown from seed, which takes about eight years until the first fruits are produced, or grafted onto other citrus rootstocks, such as trifoliate orange.

Various cultivars have been developed based on the Citrus unshiu, and in Japan, three cultivars, namely miyagawa wase, okitsu wase, and aoshima unshu, account for nearly half of the production volume of Citrus unshiu.

== History ==
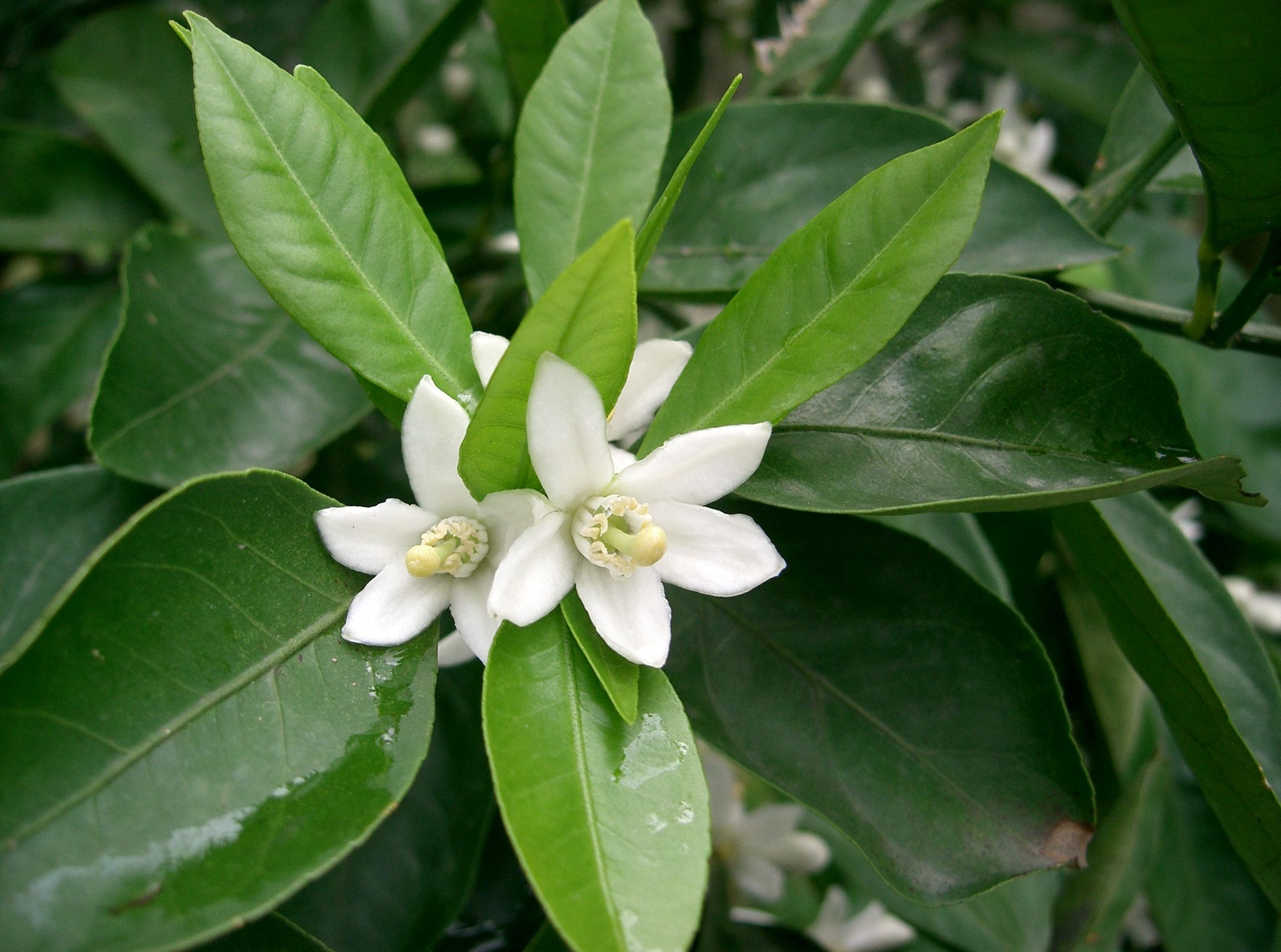
Citrus unshiu flower

=== Origins ===
Historically, there are two main theories regarding the origin of Citrus unshiu: one proposing a Japanese origin and the other a Chinese origin. The species was named after Unshu (Wenzhou), a famous production area of Citrus species in China, in the late Edo period of Japan.

According to the Japanese origin theory, the species citrus unshiu emerged in Nishi-Nakajima, Higo Province (later Nagashima, Kagoshima), in the 1600s as a result of parent species introduced from China. This theory is supported by the Japanese Ministry of Agriculture, Forestry and Fisheries, Ehime Prefecture, and several Japanese scientists. Before the name unshu mikan was established, it was locally known as nakajima mikan or nagashima mikan after the location of its purported birth.

Genetic analyses by Chinese scientists generally support that Citrus unshiu (unshiu mandarin) arose through natural hybridisation among Chinese mandarin lineages. One genomic study inferred 'Ruju' as the seed parent and 'Bendiguang' as the pollen parent, and proposed eastern Zhejiang, especially the Huangyan area of Taizhou, as a plausible origin because related cultivated mandarins have long co-occurred there and the region has a documented history of mandarin cultivation spanning more than 1,700 years.

Genetic studies by Japanese scientists suggest that the maternal parent of Citrus unshiu is kishu (Citrus kinokuni) and the paternal parent is kunenbo (Citrus nobilis Lour. var. kunip).

=== History in Japan ===
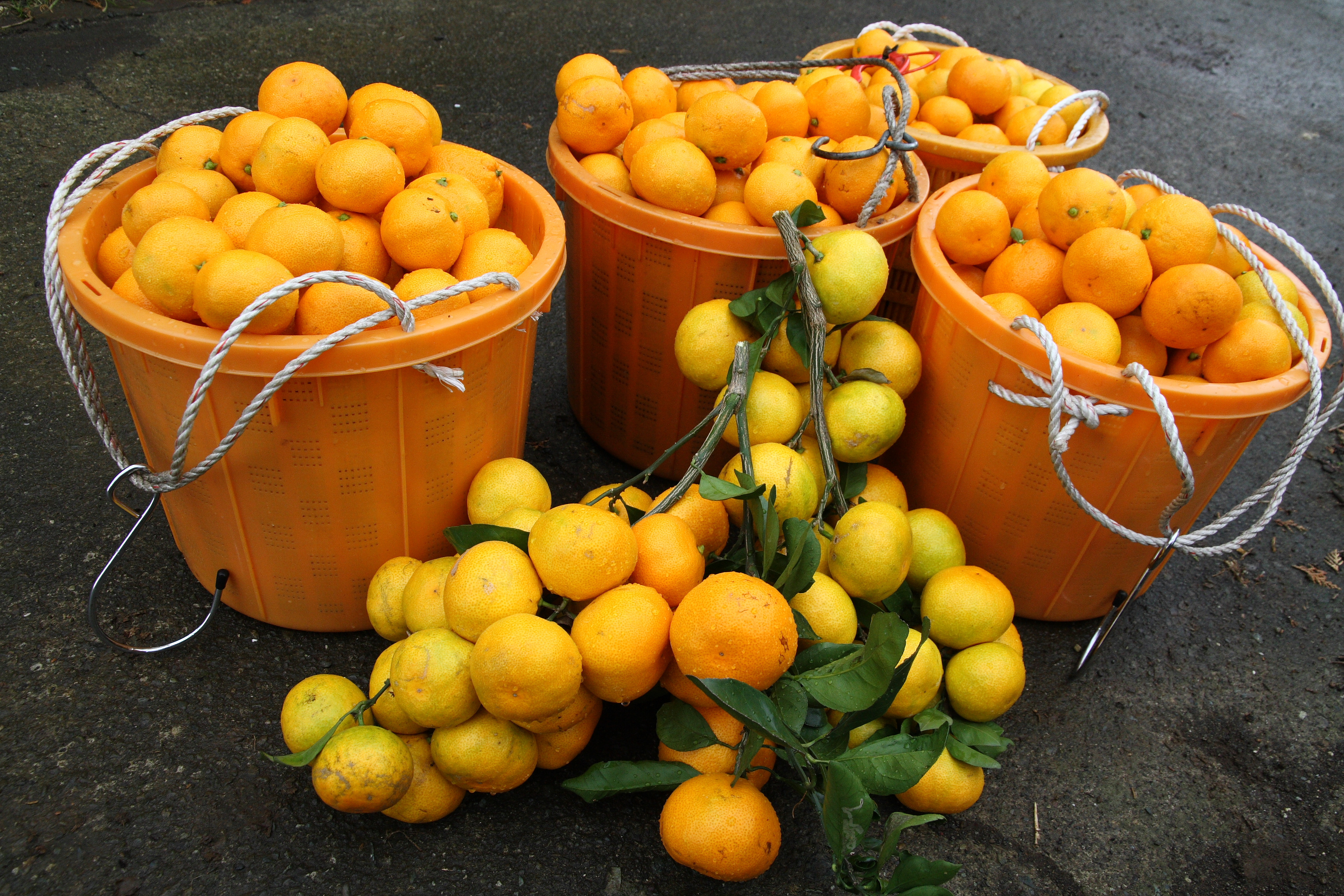
Harvested mikan oranges

After its formation in China, mandarin was probably introduced to Japan through cultural exchange and maritime trade from the Tang dynasty onwards. Historical records and genomic evidence suggest that the cultivar later diversified in Japan primarily through somatic mutations, resulting in the wide variety of modern Satsuma mandarins cultivated today.

During the Edo period, kishu mikans remained the dominant variety due to a popular superstition that consuming the seedless Citrus unshiu made an individual prone to infertility. It was only after the modernisation of the Meiji period that Citrus unshiu surged in popularity, eventually becoming closely associated with Japanese winter culture and the use of kotatsu.

=== Spread to the United States ===
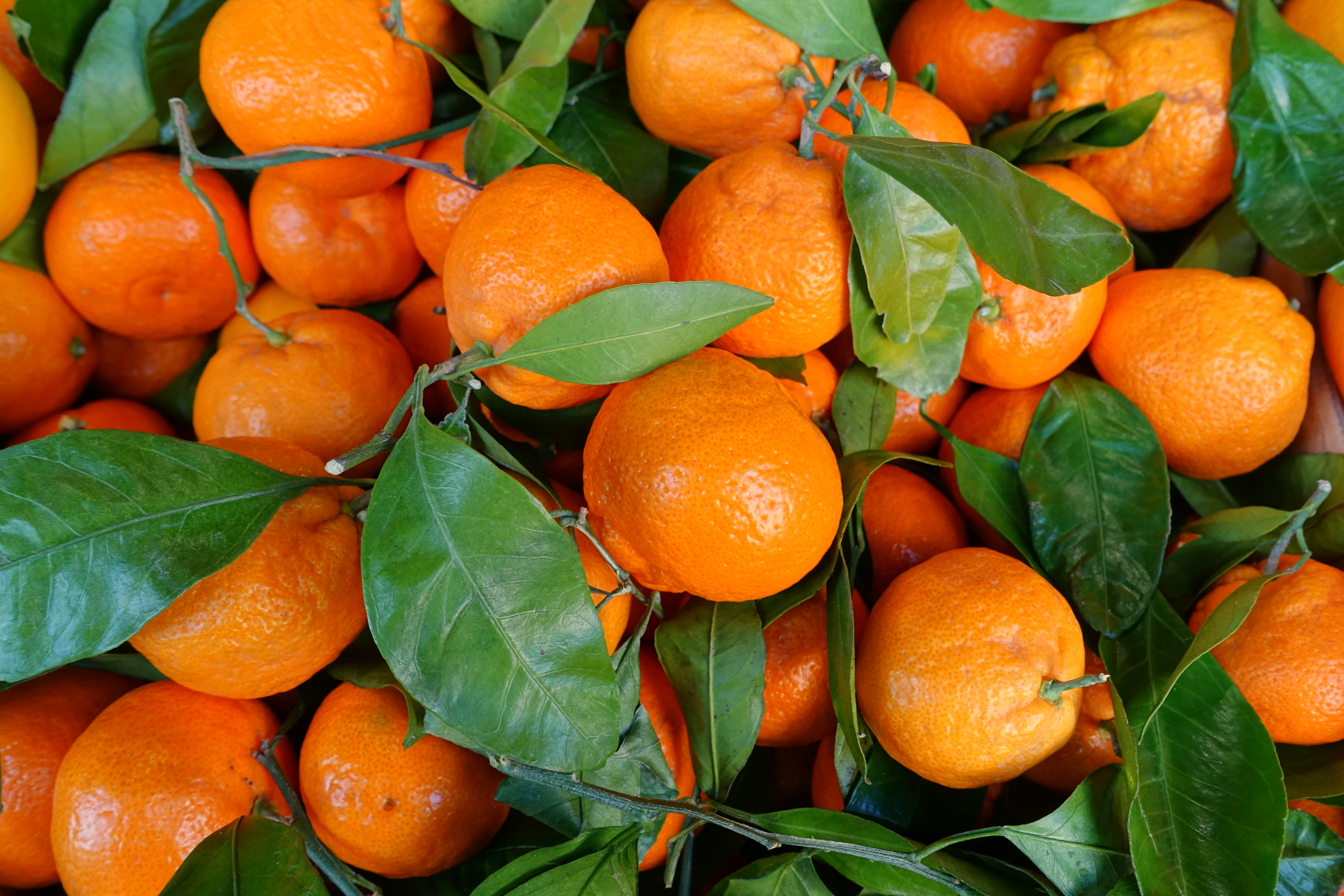
Satsuma oranges being sold in San Francisco, United States

Jesuits brought the fruit from Asia to North America in the 18th century, establishing groves at the Jesuit Plantation upriver from New Orleans, Louisiana (then part of New Spain). The municipal street "Orange" in New Orleans was originally named "Rue Des Orangers" after this site. These groves were later relocated further south to Plaquemines Parish, Louisiana, to provide better protection from frost; the Becnel family remains the largest citrus growers in the region today.

The fruit became significantly more common in the United States during the late 19th century. In 1878, Owari mikans were brought from the Satsuma region of Japan to the United States by Anna Van Valkenburgh, the wife of General Robert B. Van Valkenburgh, the US Minister to Japan. She renamed the fruit "satsumas" after their region of origin. Between 1908 and 1911, approximately one million Owari mikan trees were imported and planted across the lower Gulf Coast states. Owari is still commonly grown in Florida. Several towns, including Satsuma, Alabama, Satsuma, Florida, Satsuma, Texas, and Satsuma, Louisiana, were named after the fruit. By 1920, Jackson County, Florida, had declared itself the "Satsuma Capital of the World". However, the commercial industry suffered major setbacks due to a −13.3 °C (8.1 °F) cold snap in 1911, a hurricane in 1915, and severe freezes in the late 1930s.

== Distribution ==
Citrus unshiu is amongst others grown in Japan, Spain, central China, Korea, the US, South Africa, South America, New Zealand, and around the Black Sea.

== Varieties ==
Unshiu varieties cluster among the mandarin family. There are, however, some hybrids.

=== Possible non-hybrids ===
- Kishu mikan
- Ōgonkan or Ki-mikan
- Komikan

=== Hybrids ===
- Amanatsu (pomelo hybrid)
- Kinkoji unshiu (C. obovoidea(kinkoji) × C. unshiu)
- Kiyomi
  - Dekopon is a kiyomi hybrid
- Kobayashi mikan (C. natsudaidai × C.unshiu)
- Shonan Gold
- Iyokan

== Uses ==
Citrius unshiu is widely eaten, and is used in desserts and confections. In China, the peel is also used as medicine.

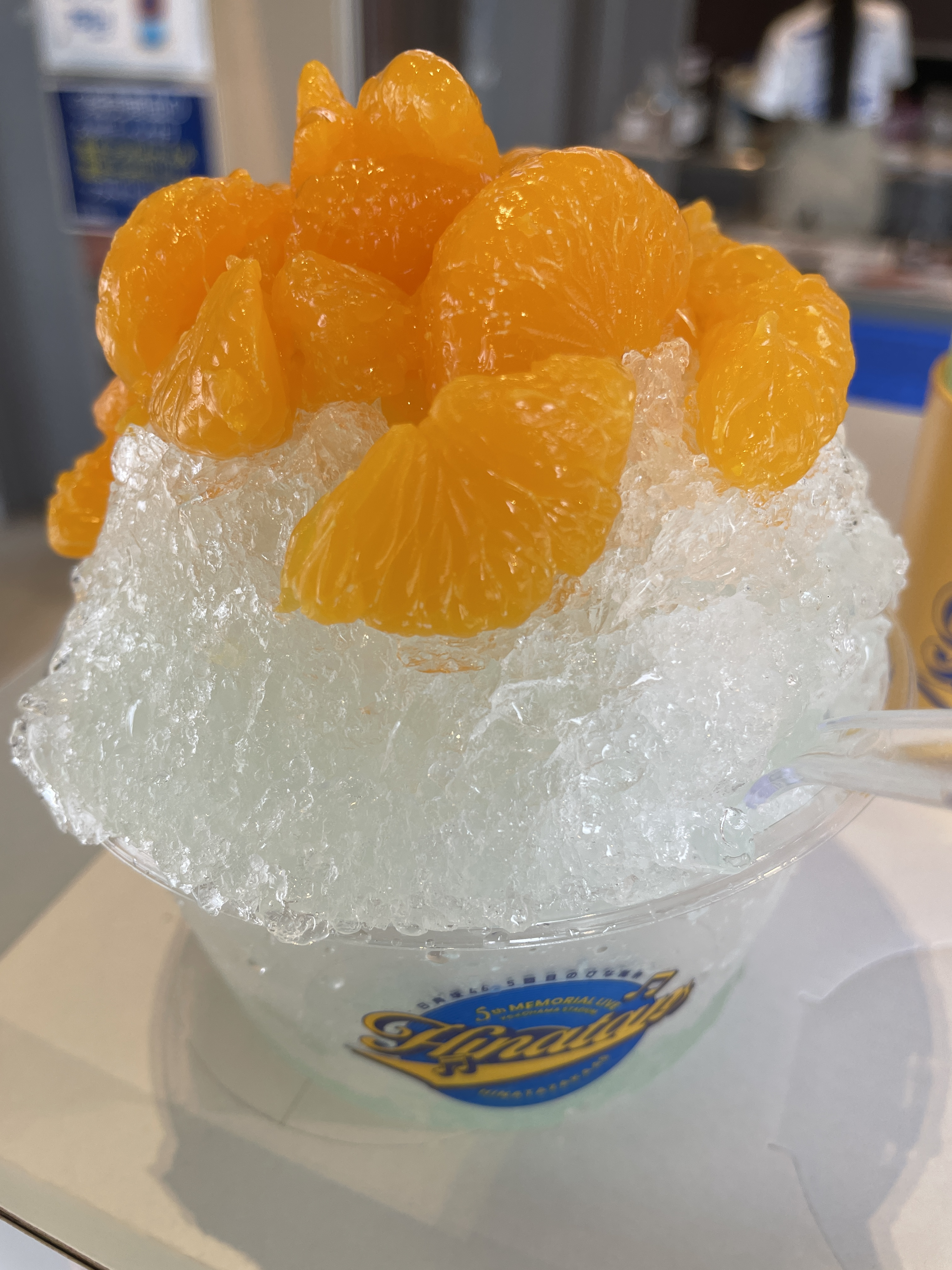
Mikan-gori, Japanese shaved ice with orange pieces

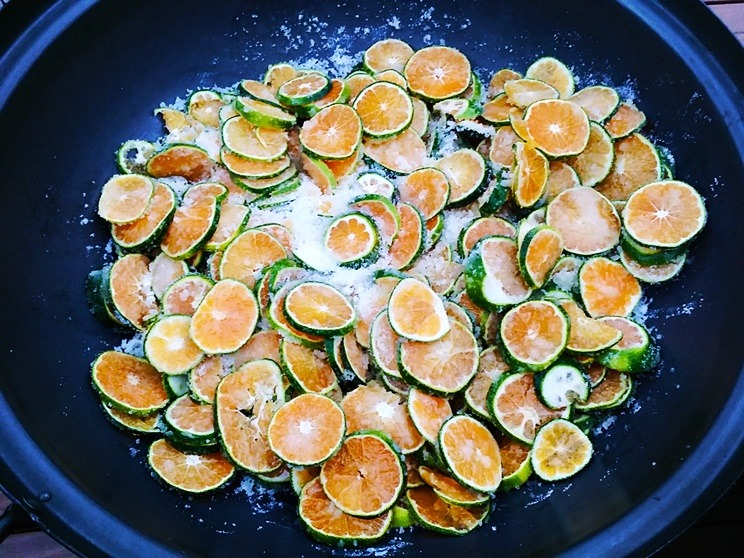
Korean putgyul syrup, made from unripe oranges

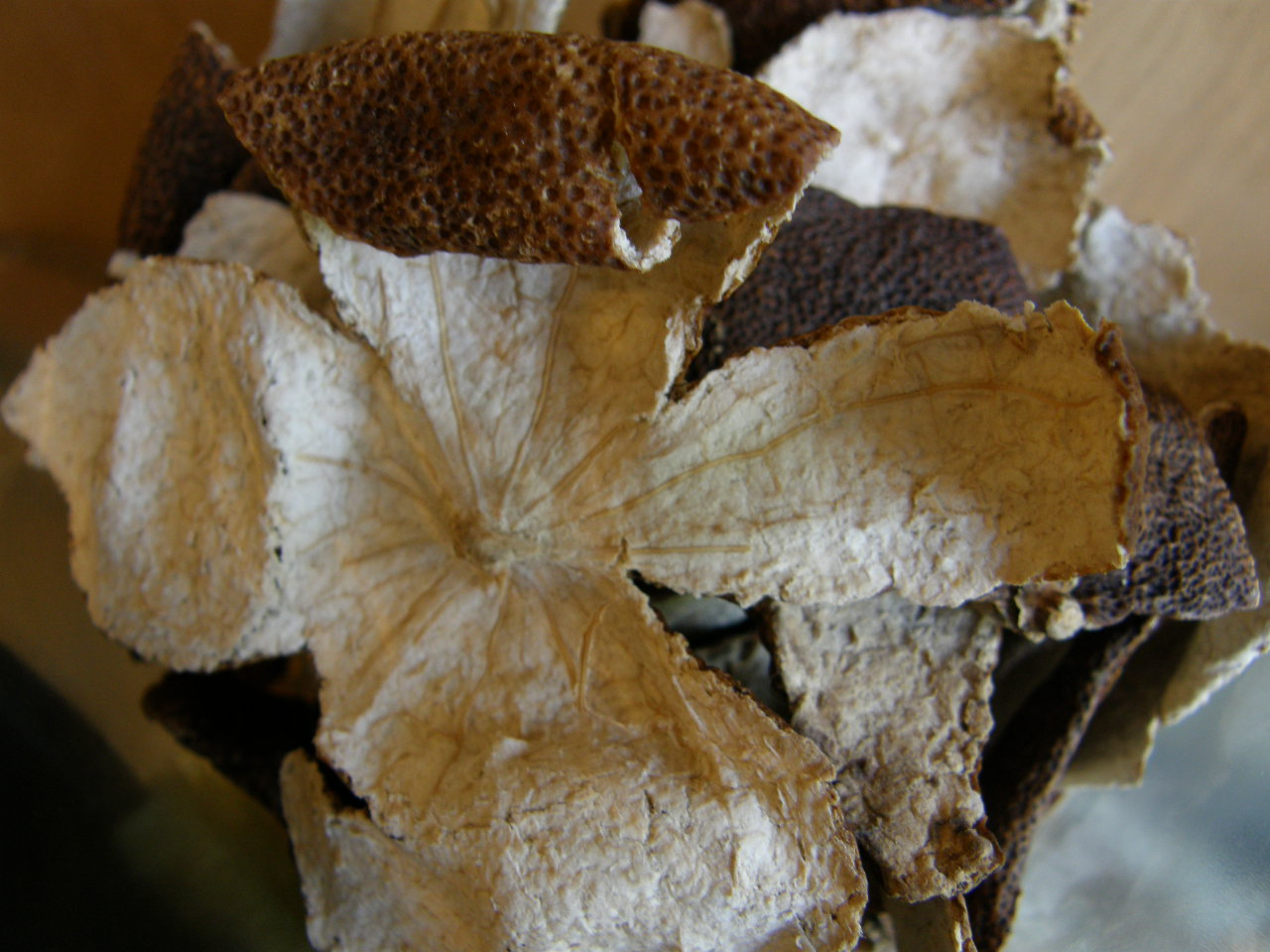
The dried peel is used in Chinese cuisine
