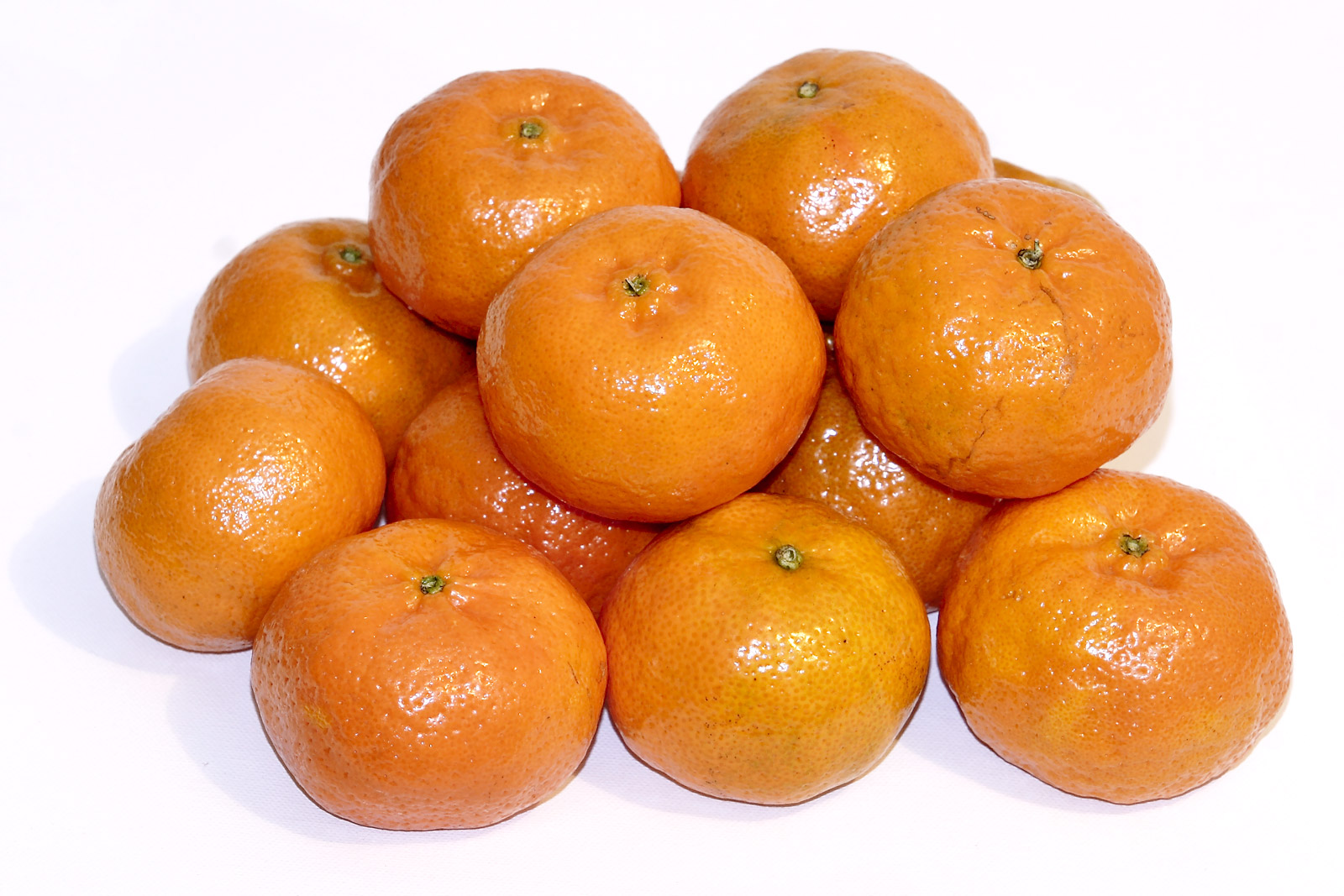
- Koji orange fruits

Scientific classification
- Kingdom: Plantae
- Clade: Tracheophytes
- Clade: Angiosperms
- Clade: Eudicots
- Clade: Rosids
- Order: Sapindales
- Family: Rutaceae
- Genus: Citrus
- Species: C. leiocarpa

Binomial name
- Citrus leiocarpa hort. ex Tanaka (1927)

Forms
- Citrus leiocarpa f. monoembryota Tanaka

Synonyms
- Citrus leiocarpa hort.; Citrus × leiocarpa Yu.Tanaka

= Koji orange =

Species of plant

Koji orange (コウジ) (Citrus leiocarpa), also known as the smooth-fruited orange, is a Citrus species native to Japan. The specific epithet (leiocarpa) comes from the Greek λεῖος leîos 'smooth', and καρπός karpós 'fruit'. It is a taxonomical synonym of Citrus aurantium.

== Distribution ==
Besides Japan, it is grown in the United States, and other parts of East Asia including South Korea and China.

== Description ==
The fruit is oblate in shape, slightly ribbed, bright orange in color, very small, and very seedy, and for the latter two reasons it is not grown for commercial use. It ripens from October through November and has been cultivated since at least 1900. It may be monoembryonic. The tree is densely branched and has a broad crown and a short, straight trunk. The leaves are dark green and elliptical in shape.

== Genetics ==
Citrus leiocarpa is inferred to be a hybrid between a koji-type species (seed parent) and the tachibana orange (pollen parent, Citrus tachibana). Its genotype matches with that of the komikan and toukan varieties.

== Varieties ==
Citrus leiocarpa f. monoembryota, a form of Citrus leiocarpa, was described by Chozaburo Tanaka. Once believed to be a mutation of the koji orange, it has been revealed that it is a hybrid between koji (pollen parent) and kishu (seed parent). In Chinese, it is called 駿河柑子 (jun he gan zi) and is called スルガユコウ (suruga yukō) and 駿河柚柑 (suruga yuzukan) in Japanese.

== See also ==
- Japanese citrus
- List of citrus fruits
