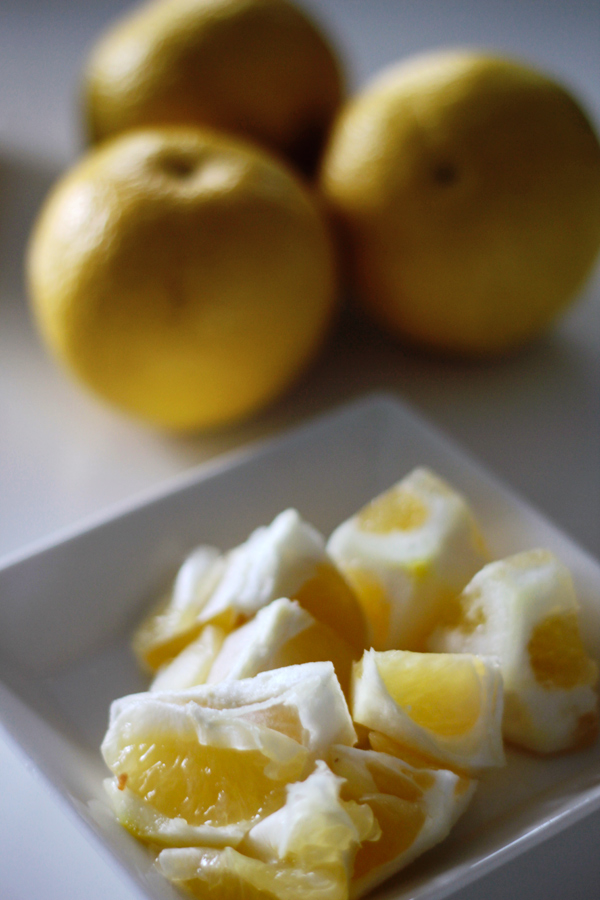

Scientific classification
- Kingdom: Plantae
- Clade: Tracheophytes
- Clade: Angiosperms
- Clade: Eudicots
- Clade: Rosids
- Order: Sapindales
- Family: Rutaceae
- Genus: Citrus
- Species: C. tamurana

Binomial name
- Citrus tamurana Hort. ex Tanaka

= Hyuganatsu =

Citrus fruit and plant

Hyuganatsu (Japanese: 日向夏, Hepburn: Hyūganatsu; species Citrus tamurana) is a citrus fruit and plant grown in Japan. The name comes from Hyūga, the ancient name of Miyazaki Prefecture in Kyushu, where the citrus is said to have originated, while natsu (夏) means summer. Hyuganatsu grown outside Kyushu are sometimes shipped under different names such as Konatsu (小夏), Tosakonatsu (土佐小夏), or New Summer Orange (ニューサマーオレンジ).

== Origin ==
A hyūganatsu sapling was said to have been found in a Miyazaki garden sometime in the 1820s, after which it became widely cultivated throughout the region. It is theorized to be either a mutated yuzu or perhaps more likely, a chance hybrid between yuzu and pomelo.

== Description ==
The fruit is of medium size and its shape is round to slightly oblong. When ripe, it turns a light yellow. Its flesh is juicy and sweet with a slightly sour taste. It is usually eaten cut up, sprinkled with sugar and with most of its rather thick pith intact.

The fruit's oil is higher than other citrus fruits in trans-β-farnesene, l-carvone, and has a higher number of ketones.

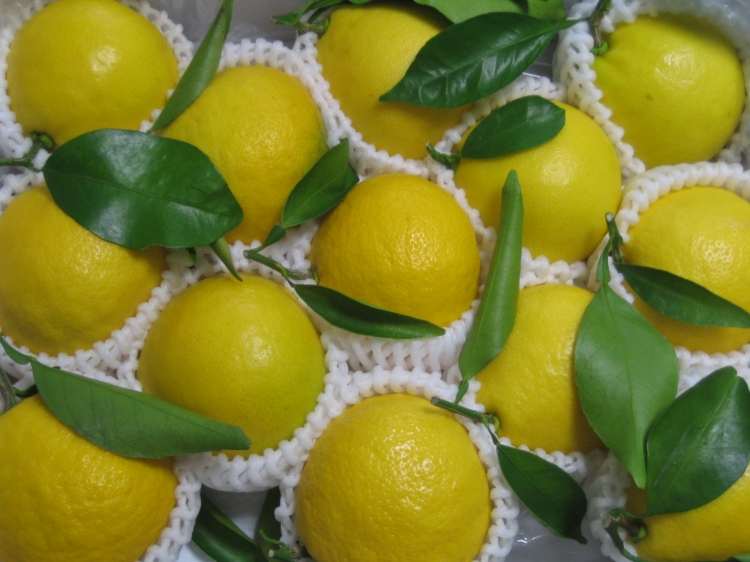

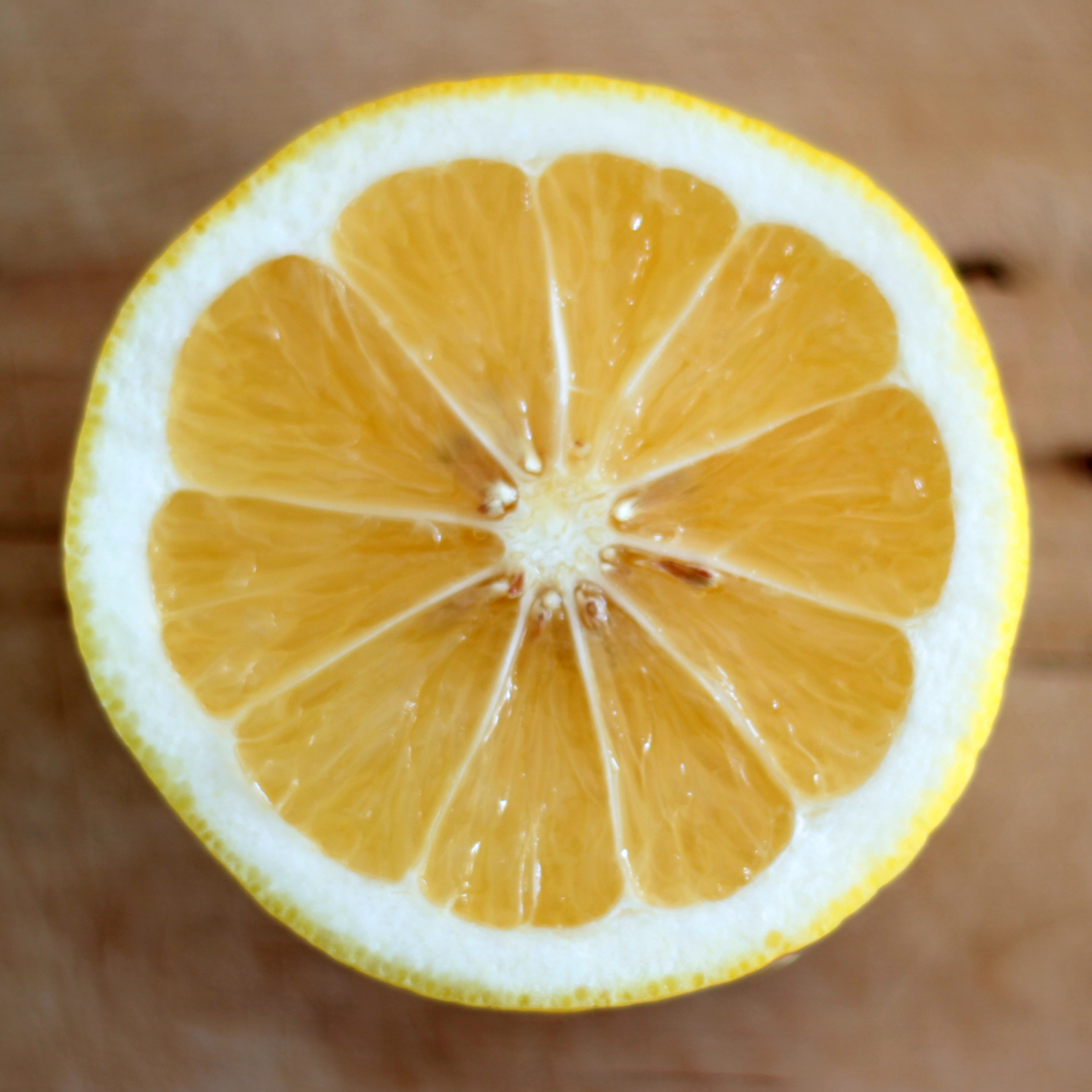

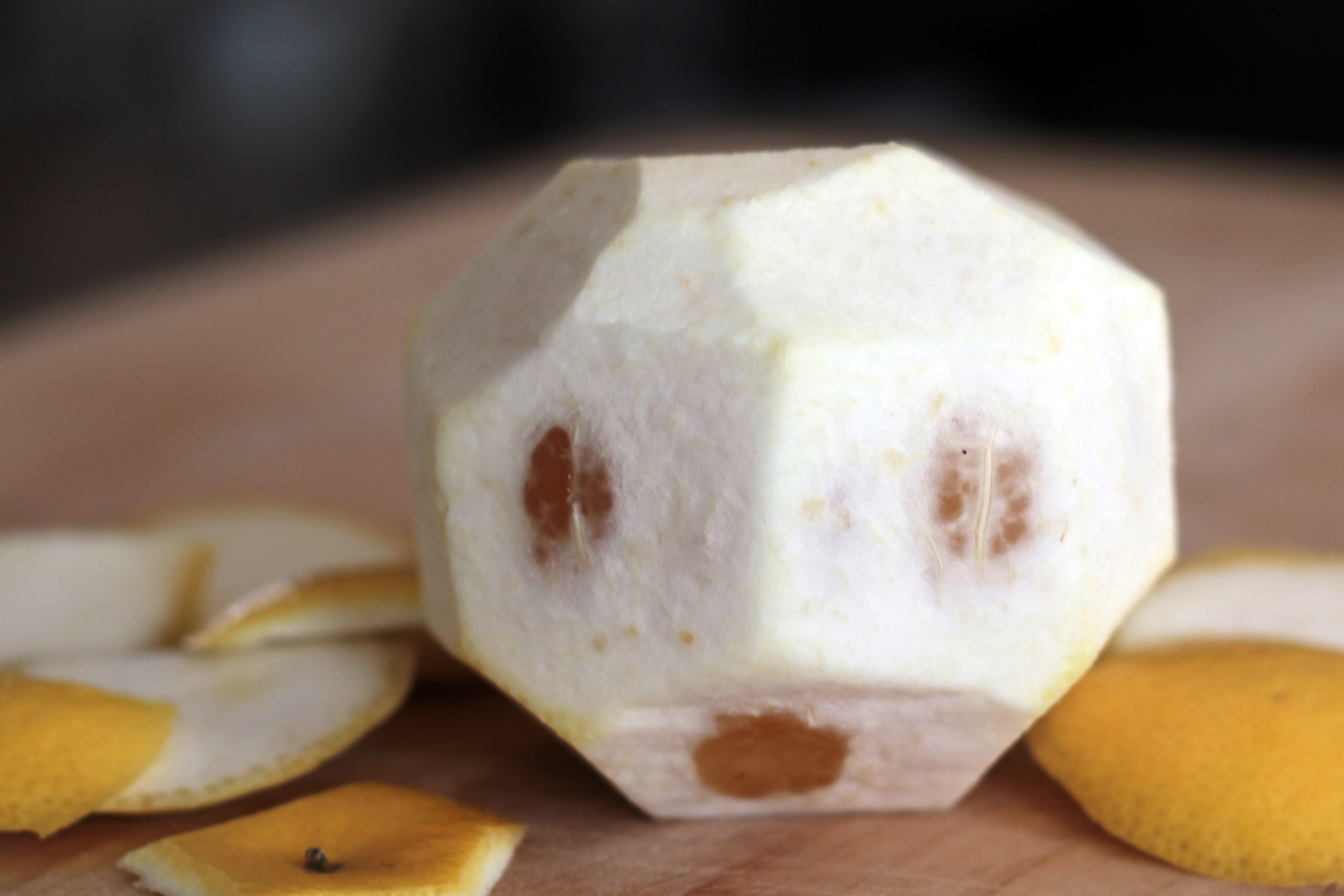

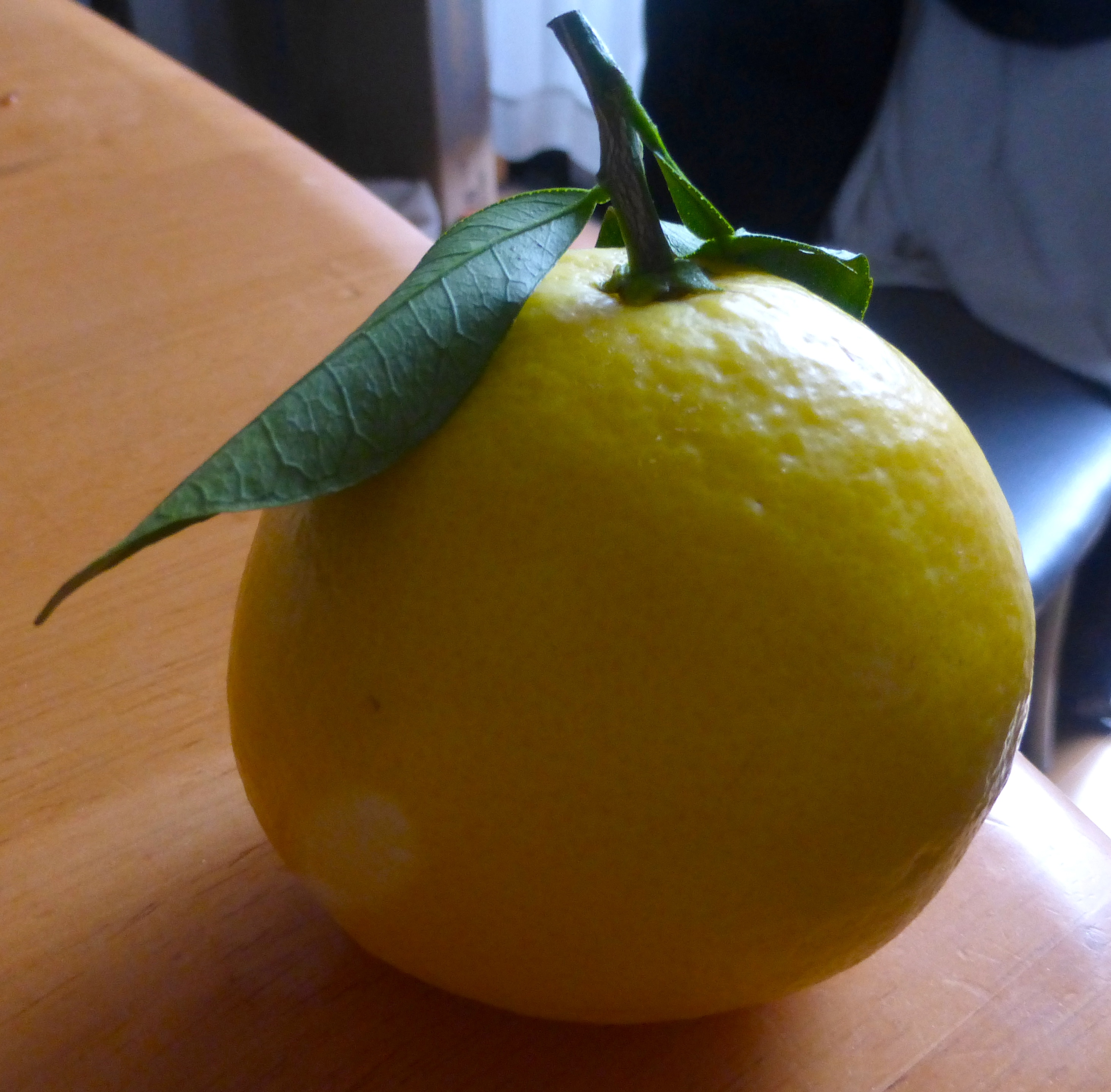

== See also ==
- Amanatsu
- Japanese citrus
- Ōgonkan
