= Etrog (disambiguation) =

Etrog or Esrog is the Hebrew word for the citron fruit or Citrus medica. It may refer to:

- For the Jewish religious rite utilizing the fruit, see Etrog
- For the particular variety of citron bearing this name, see Variety etrog
- Etrog may refer also to the rest of citron varieties which are also employed in the ritual. Some of them are, the Ashkenazic Diamante citron, the Yemenite citron and the Balady citron.
- Etrog (political term)

Etrog and Essrog are also Jewish surnames.

- Sorel Etrog, Canadian sculptor and designer of the statuette for the Canadian Film Awards in use from 1968 to 1978, and for the Genie Awards from 1980 to 2012.
  - Etrog Awards, a nickname for the Canadian Film Awards in use in the 1970s based on their use of Etrog's statuette design.
