= Etrog (political term) =

Israeli political term

Etrog (literally "citron", but has a special meaning in Judaism, see "Etrog") has become an epithet in the Israeli politics for a politician whom journalists prefer not to criticize. The corresponding preferential treatment by journalists is called אתרוגנות, "etrogization", as well as a verb לְאַתְרֵג, "to etrogize": to protect as an etrog.

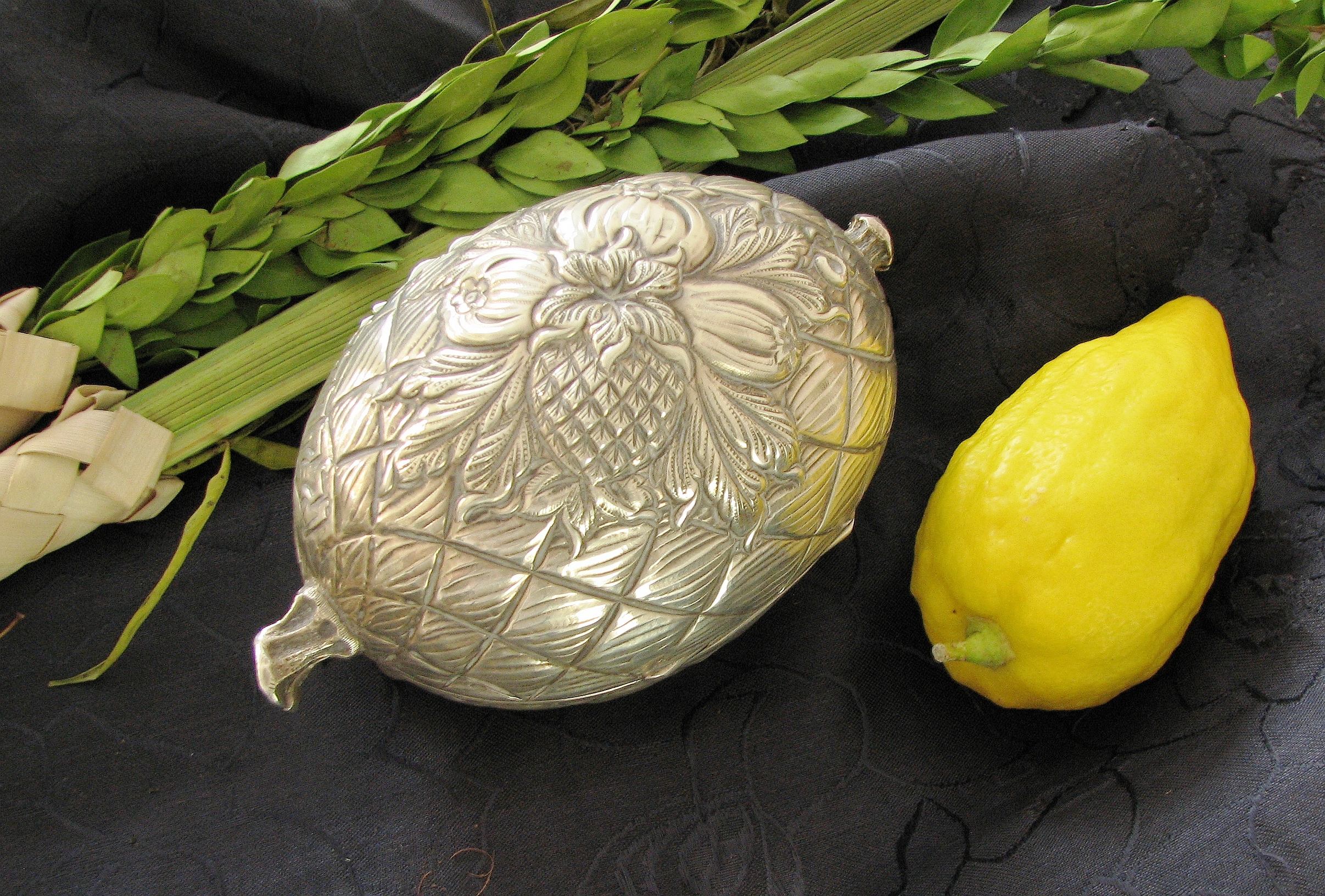
"Should be protected as an etrog"

The first use of this metaphor is attributed to the Israeli journalist Amnon Abramovich. In February 2005, during Ariel Sharon's campaign to promote his disengagement plan, Abramovich (who supported the plan) said that Israeli journalists should protect Sharon like an etrog: as long as the disengagement plan was not completed they should cherish him and refrain from attacking him, but once the plan was carried out they should treat him like an etrog after the holiday [of Sukkot] is over, i.e. stop protecting him.
