= Etrog =

Edible fruit cultivar

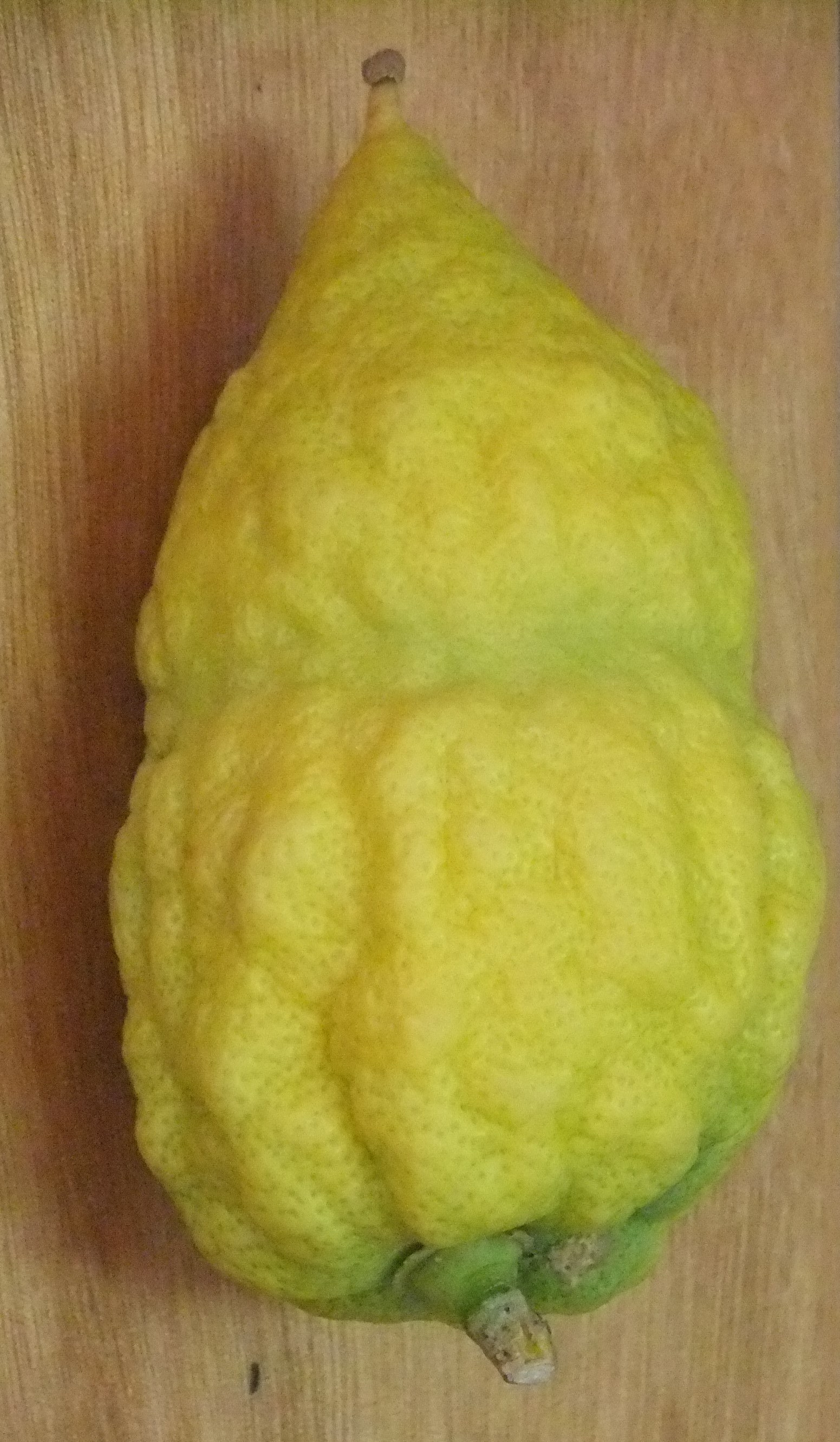
An Israeli etrog, with pitam and gartel (trough around the center)

Etrog (Hebrew: אֶתְרוֹג, plural: etrogim; Ashkenazi Hebrew: esrog, plural: esrogim), also spelled esrog is the yellow citron (Citrus medica) used by Jews during the weeklong holiday of Sukkot as one of the four species. Together with the lulav, hadass, and aravah, the etrog is taken in hand and held or waved during specific portions of the holiday prayers. Special care is often given to selecting an etrog for the performance of the Sukkot holiday rituals.

== Etymology ==
The romanization of the Hebrew as etrog from Sephardi Hebrew is widely used. The Ashkenazi Hebrew pronunciation is esrog or esrig. It has been transliterated as etrog or ethrog in scholarly works. The Hebrew word is thought to derive from the Persian name for the fruit, wādrang, which first appears in the Vendidad. Related words are (Persian: ترنج, romanized: toronj) and Jewish Babylonian Aramaic: אַתְרוּגָּא, romanized: ʾaṯruggā. It has also made its way into Arabic as أُتْرُجَّةِ utrujjah notably in a hadith collected in the Sahih Muslim. A rare Aramaic form, eṯrungā (אֶתְרוּנְגָּא), is significant because it retains the alveolar nasal sound (as indicated by the nun) of wādrang, also observable in the English word 'orange'.

== Taxonomy ==
In Modern Hebrew, etrog is the name for any variety or form of citron, whether kosher for the ritual or not. In general usage, though, the word is often reserved to refer only to those varieties and specimens used ritually as one of the four species. Some taxonomic experts, like Hodgson and others, have mistakenly treated etrog as one specific variety of citron. The various Jewish rites utilize different varieties, according to their tradition or the decision of their respective posek.

== Biblical references ==
On the first day you shall take the fruit of majestic trees, branches of palm trees, boughs of leafy trees, and willows of the brook; and you shall rejoice before the Lord your God for seven days.

— Leviticus 23:40, New Revised Standard Version

According to one study, the biblical phrase peri 'etz hadar (פְּרִי עֵץ הָדָר) (translated above as "fruit of majestic trees") is syntactically and lexically ambiguous, and has been interpreted or translated in at least fifteen distinct ways. Some of the best-known approaches are "fruit from beautiful trees", (Targum Pseudo-Jonathan; Martin Luther; NRSV cited above), "beautiful tree-fruit", (the Samaritans; Septuagint; Abraham ibn Ezra), or "branches of beautiful trees" (King James Version). Most Rabbinic translations directly link peri 'etz hadar to the etrog, e.g., "tree-fruit, that is etrogim" (Targum Onkelos), "etrog fruit from the etrog tree" (Nachmanides), or "fruit of the etrog tree" (Saadia Gaon). Some other approaches to the ambiguity have been "cone of the cedar tree" (Shmuel Tolkowsky), "fruit of the olive tree" (Irving Koller), or "branches of the myrtle tree" (Arnold Ehrlich).

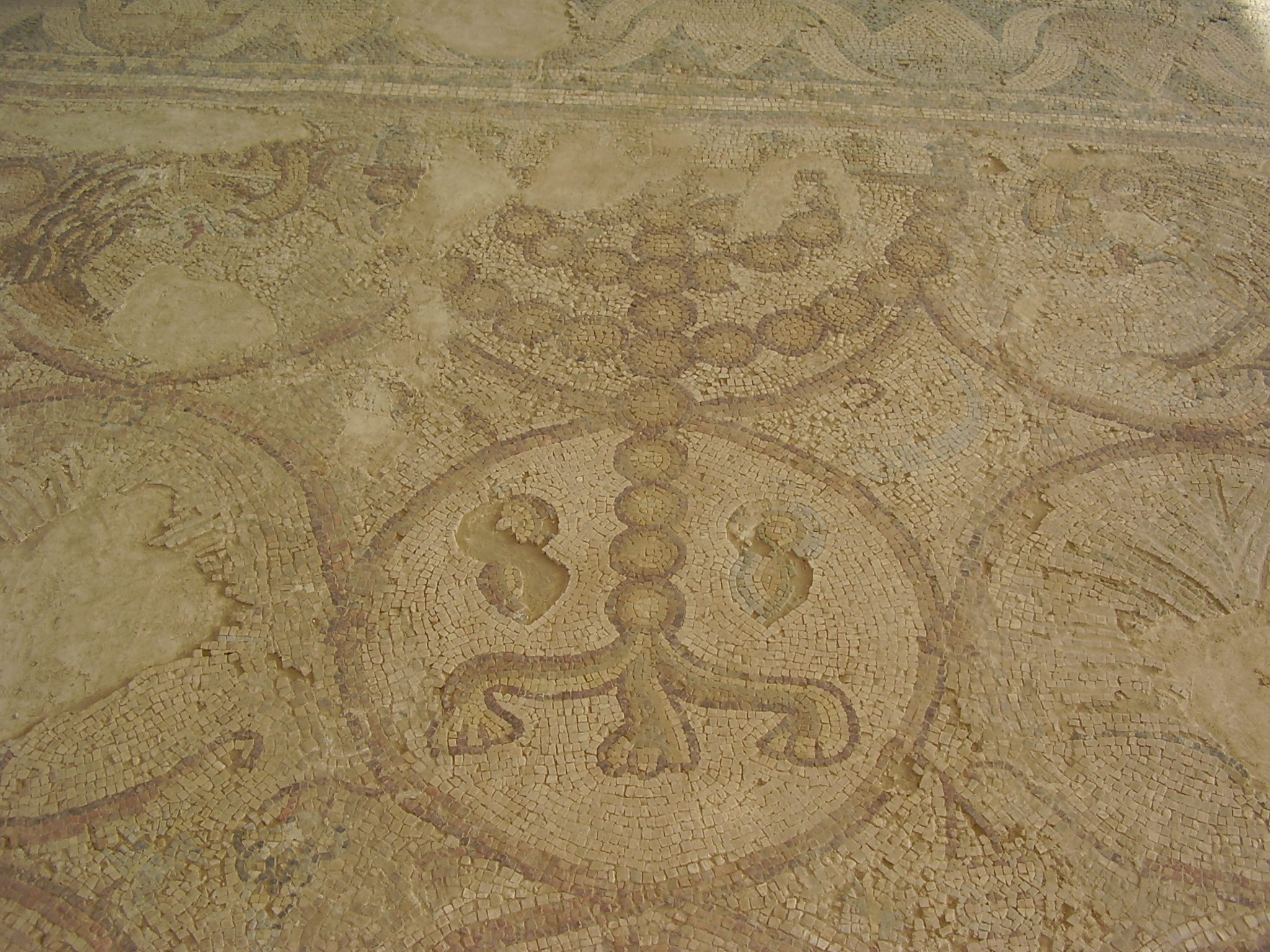
Original mosaic of ancient Maon Synagogue (before the 6th century CE), depicting etrogim at the base of a menorah

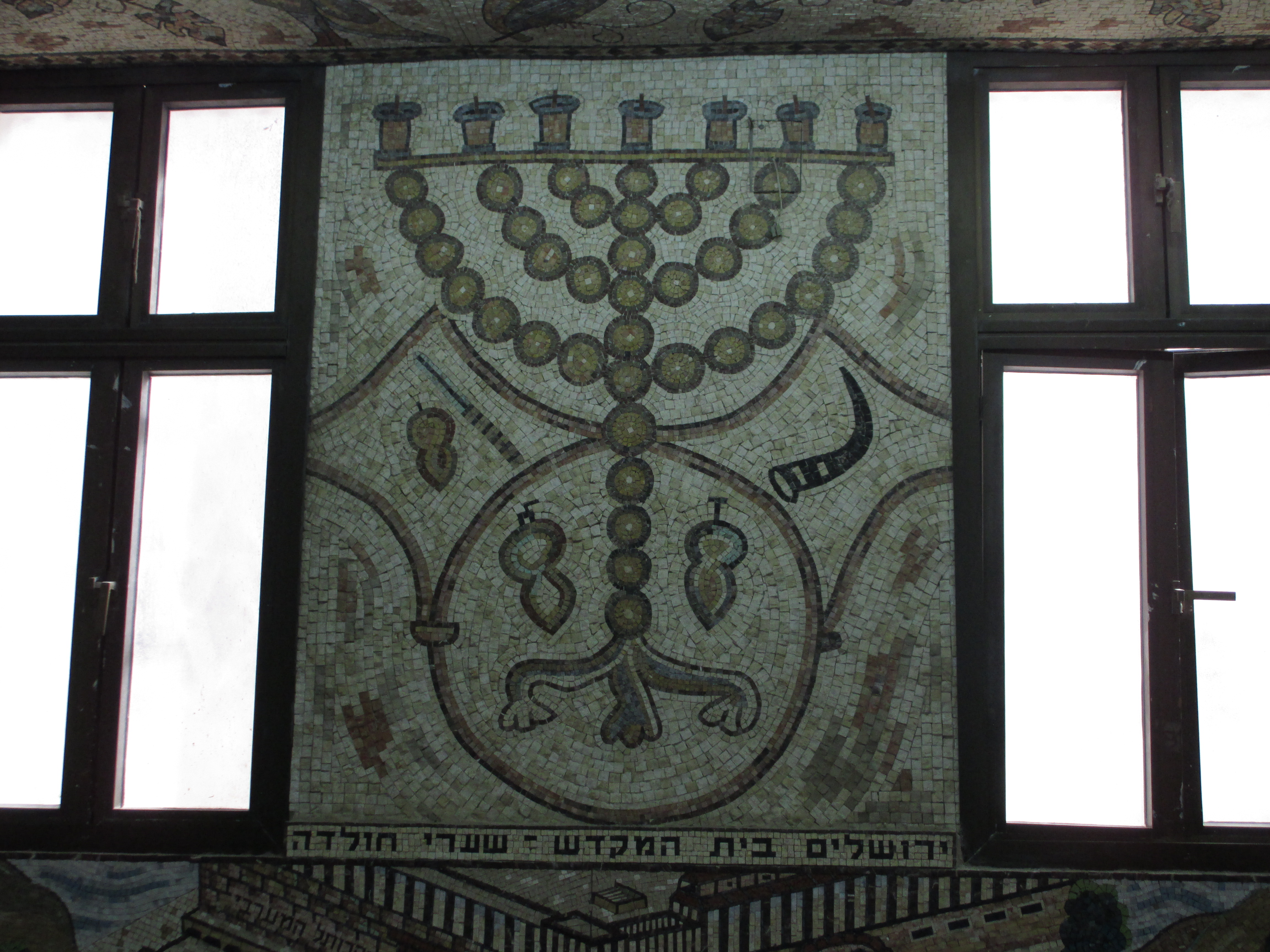
Replica of Maon Mosaic in Or Torah Synagogue. A similar replica is placed at the yard of Yad Ben Zvi.

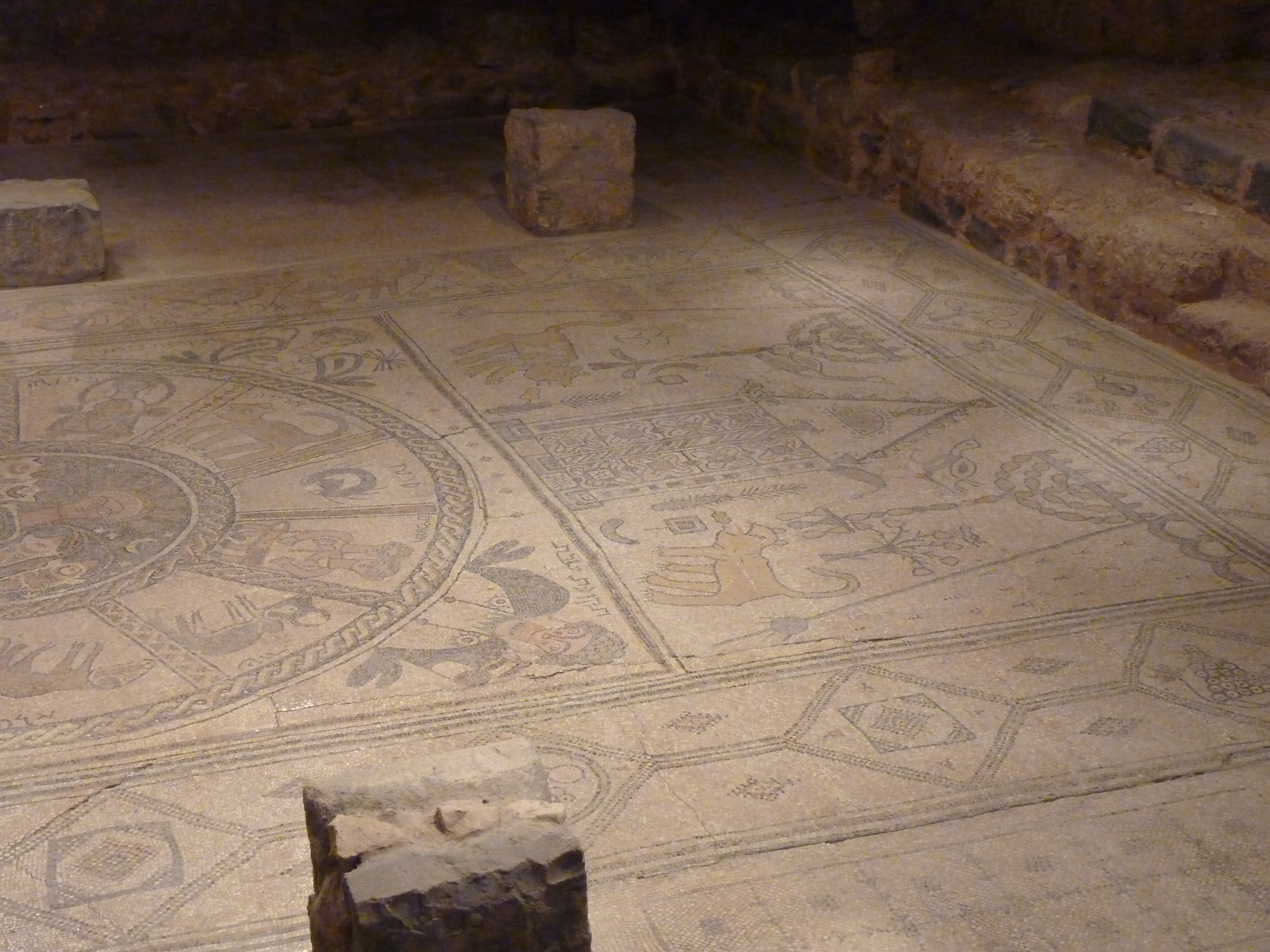
Ancient Mosaic of Beth Alpha Synagogue, depicting etrog alongside a lulav, shofar and a menora

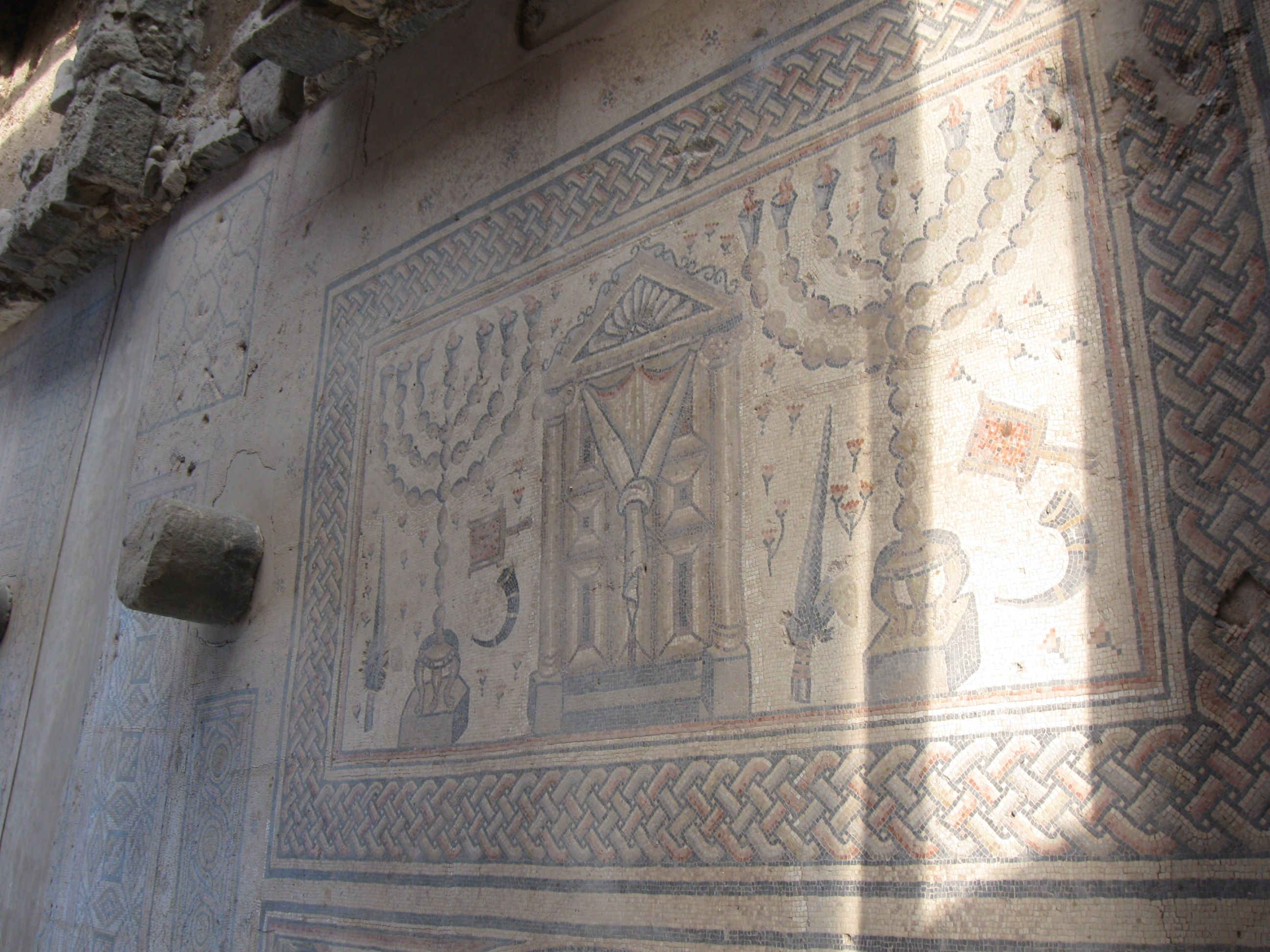
The four species near a Shofar and Menorah, also found in the ancient Hamat Tiberias Synagogue

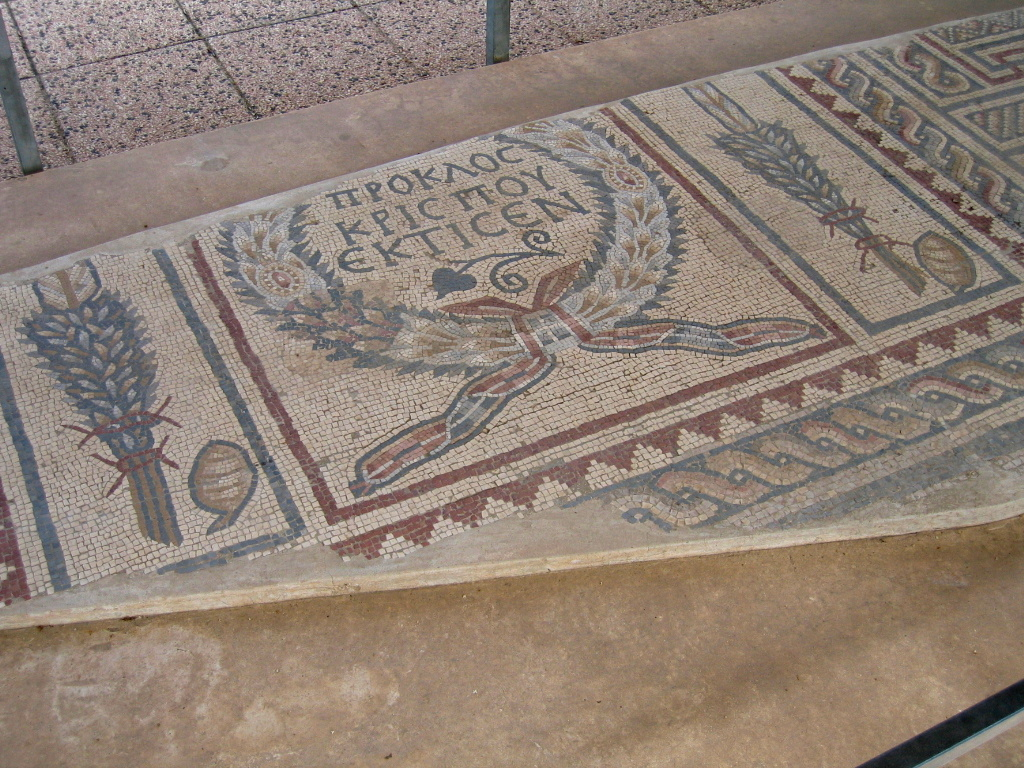
Ancient mosaic of Tiberian Synagogue, today in Eretz Israel Museum

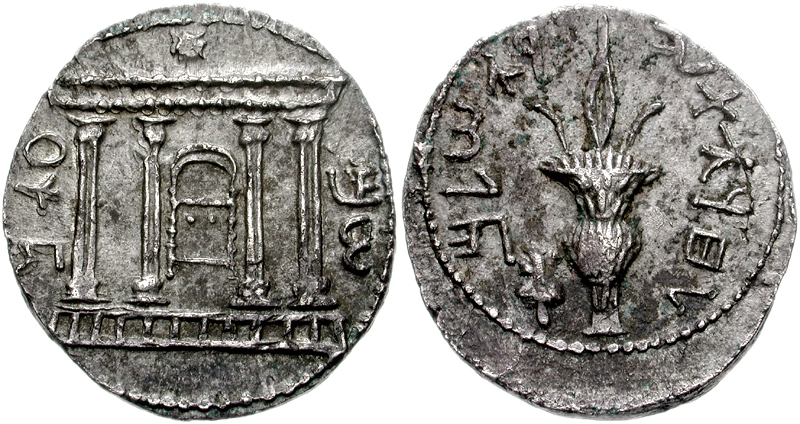
Bar Kokhba silver coins depicting lulav and etrog

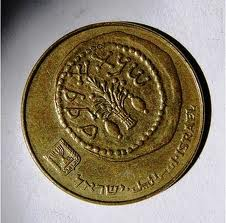
Replica of a coin of The First Jewish-Roman War depicting lulav and two etrogim

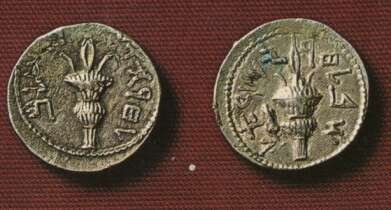
Bar Kokhba silver coins depicting lulav and etrog

In modern Hebrew, hadar refers to the genus Citrus. Nachmanides (1194 – c. 1270) suggests that the word was the original Hebrew name for the citron. According to this view, the word etrog was introduced over time and adapted from Aramaic. The Arabic name for the citron fruit, itranj (اترنج), mentioned in hadith literature, is also adapted from Aramaic.

== Historical cultivation ==
Etrogim were extensively cultivated in the Holy Land at the time of the Second Temple, and images of etrogim are found at many archaeological sites of that era, including mosaics at the Maon Synagogue, Beth Alpha Synagogue, and Hamat Tiberias Synagogue. At all of those sites, the etrog is depicted alongside other important religious symbols, like the shofar or menorah. The etrog is also found on numerous Bar Kokhba coins.

Archaeological evidence for citrus fruits is limited, as neither seeds nor pollen are likely to be routinely recovered in archaeology. The earliest evidence of etrogim in Israel is the 2012 discovery of citron pollen from the second century BCE in excavations at the Ramat Rachel site.

=== In diaspora ===
After the fall of Jerusalem in 70 CE, exiled Jews planted citron orchards wherever the climate allowed: in Southern Europe (Spain, Greece, and Italy) as well as in North Africa and Asia Minor. Jews who settled north of the warmer citron-growing areas depended on imported etrogim, which caused much anxiety given the dangers and uncertainties of sea travel. By the seventeenth century, some of the most popular sources for etrogim were the islands of Corsica and Corfu.

Since the late 1850s, the Fruit of the Goodly Tree Association in Mandatory Palestine represented etrog farmers who marketed their crops to Jews in Europe. Some Jewish communities still preferred citrons from Italy, Greece, Morocco, or Yemen, but many Jews seeking citrons turned back to Eretz Yisrael, the land of Israel.

American Jews continue to import the majority of their holiday etrogim from Israel, except during shmita when there are halachic complications in exporting the produce of Israel. The only commercial grower of etrogs in the United States is John Kirkpatrick, the former chairman of the Citrus Research Board, on a ranch in the town of Exeter in the San Joaquin Valley of California. Kirkpatrick, who is not Jewish, began growing etrogs in 1980 following a phone call with Yisroel Weisberger, an employee at a Judaica store in Brooklyn. In 1995, Weisberger's brother, Yaakov Shlomo Rothberg, became involved in the operation and has since become Kirkpatrick's business partner. As of 2010, Kirkpatrick has 250 etrog trees and produces 3,000 suitable etrogs per year, with 9,000 that do not qualify due to halakhic requirements. While there are other growers in California, such as Inga Dorosz and David Sleeth in the town of Gorda near Big Sur, these are not rabbinically supervised and are therefore not kosher.

== Cosmetic requirements ==
=== Pitam ===
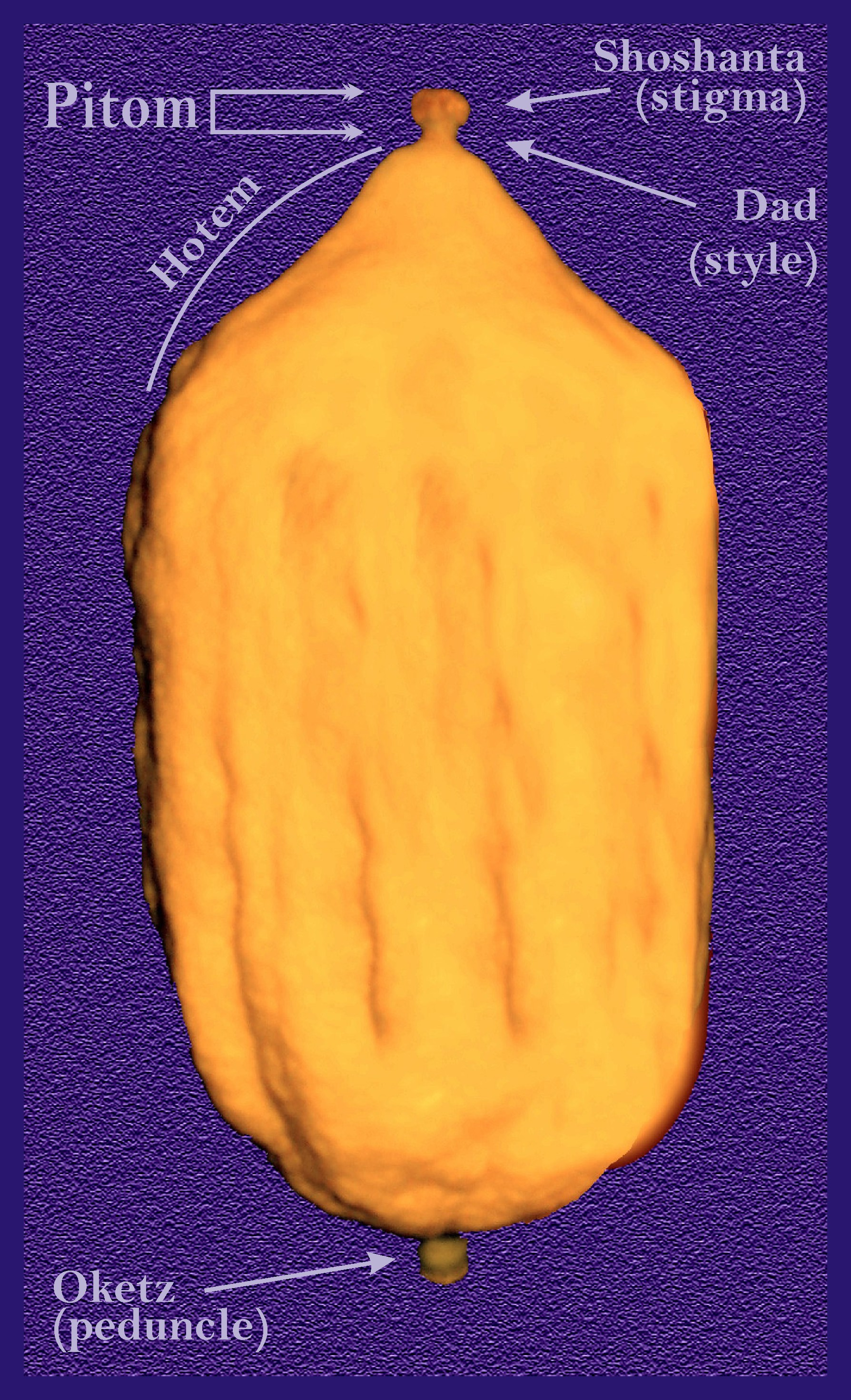
Diagram of the Halachic properties of an etrog

A pitam or pitom (Hebrew: פיטום; plural pitamim) is composed of a style (Hebrew: דַד; dad), and a stigma (Hebrew: שׁוֹשַׁנְתָּא; shoshanta), and usually falls off during the growing process. An etrog with an intact pitam is considered especially valuable, but varieties that naturally shed their pitam during growth are also considered kosher. When only the stigma breaks off, even post-harvest, the citron can still be considered kosher as long as part of the style has remained attached. If the whole pitam, i.e. the stigma and style, are unnaturally broken off in their entirety, the etrog is not kosher for ritual use.

=== Pitam preservation technique ===
Many more pitamim are preserved today due to an auxin discovered by Eliezer E. Goldschmidt, emeritus professor of horticulture at the Hebrew University. While working with the picloram hormone in a citrus orchard, he unexpectedly discovered that some of the Valencia oranges found nearby had perfectly preserved pitamim. Citrus fruits, other than an etrog or citron hybrid like the bergamot, usually do not preserve their pitam. On the occasions that they do, their pitamim tend to be dry, sunken and very fragile. In Goldschmidt's observation, the pitamim were all fresh and solid like those of the Moroccan or Greek citron varieties.

Experimenting with picloram in a laboratory, Goldschmidt eventually found the correct "dose" to achieve the desired effect: one droplet of the chemical in three million drops of water.

== Purity ==
In order for a citron to be kosher, it must be neither grafted nor hybridized with any other species. Only a few traditional varieties are therefore used. To ensure that no grafting is performed, preferred plantations are kept under strict rabbinical supervision.

=== Genetic research ===
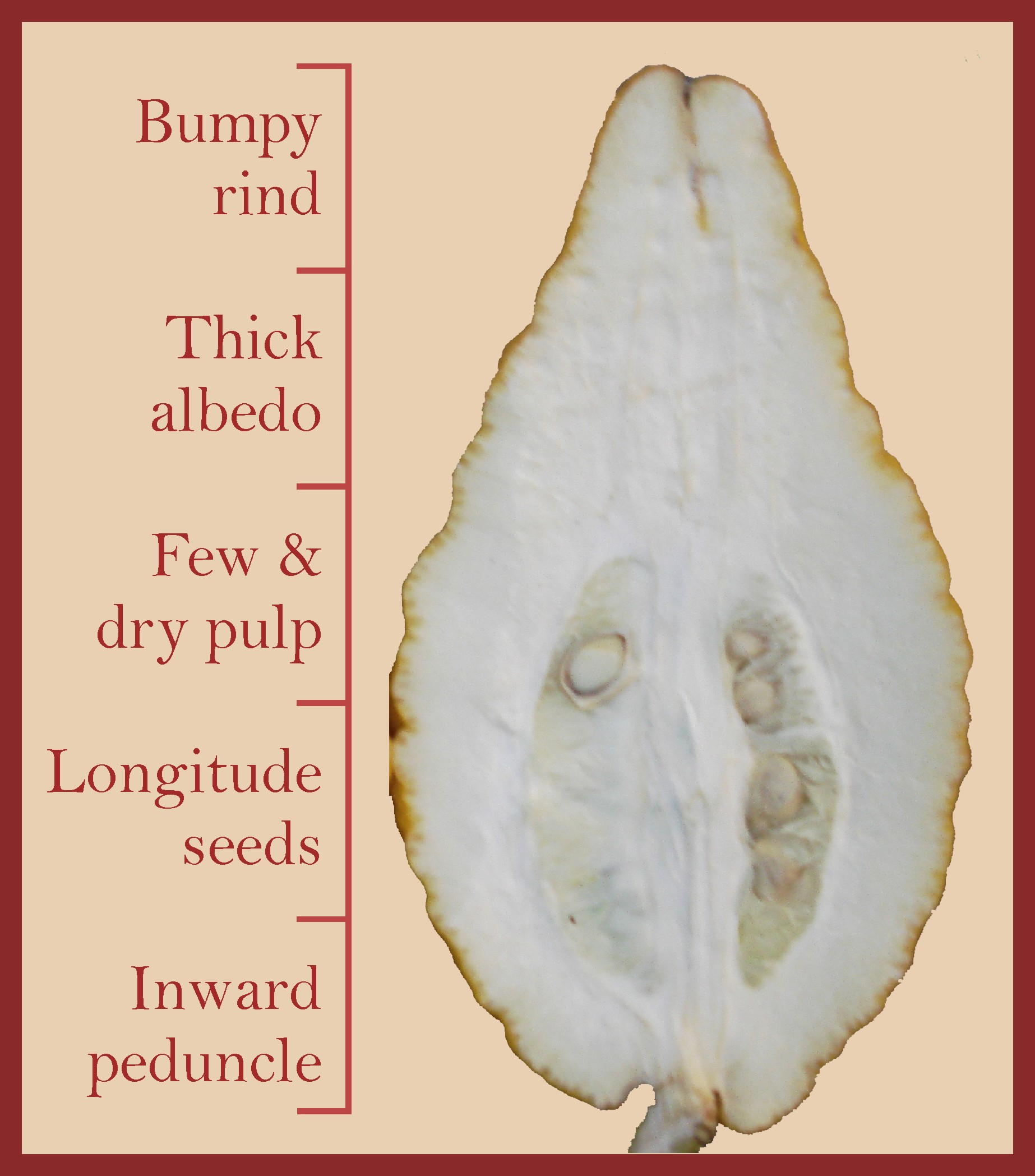
Cross section of the Balady citron showing the signs for purity

The citron varieties traditionally used as etrog are the Diamante citron from Italy, the Greek citron, the Balady citron from Israel, the Moroccan and Yemenite citrons.

A general DNA study was conducted by Eliezer E. Goldschmidt and colleagues which tested and positively identified twelve famous accessions of citron for purity and being genetically related.

The fingered and Florentine citrons, although they are also citron varieties or maybe hybrids, are not used for the ritual. The Corsican citron fell into disfavor but has recently been reintroduced for ritual use.

=== Selection and cultivation ===
In addition to the above, there are rabbinical indicators used to distinguish pure etrogim from possible hybrids. These traditional indicators have been preserved by continuous selection performed by professional farmers.

The most accepted indicators are: 1) a pure etrog has a thick rind, contrasting with its sparing pulp segments which are also almost dry, 2) the outer surface of an etrog is ribbed and warted, and 3) the etrog peduncle is somewhat buried inward. By contrast, a lemon or different citron hybrid is missing one or all of the specifications.

A later and not as widely accepted indicator is the orientation of the seed. In a pure etrog, the seeds are oriented vertically, unless crowded by neighboring seeds; in lemons and hybrids, the seeds are oriented horizontally even when they are not crowded.

The etrog is typically grown from cuttings that are two to four years old. The tree begins to bear fruit about four years after planting the cuttings. If the tree is germinated from seed, it will not bear fruit for about seven years, and there may be some genetic change to the tree or fruit.

== Customs ==
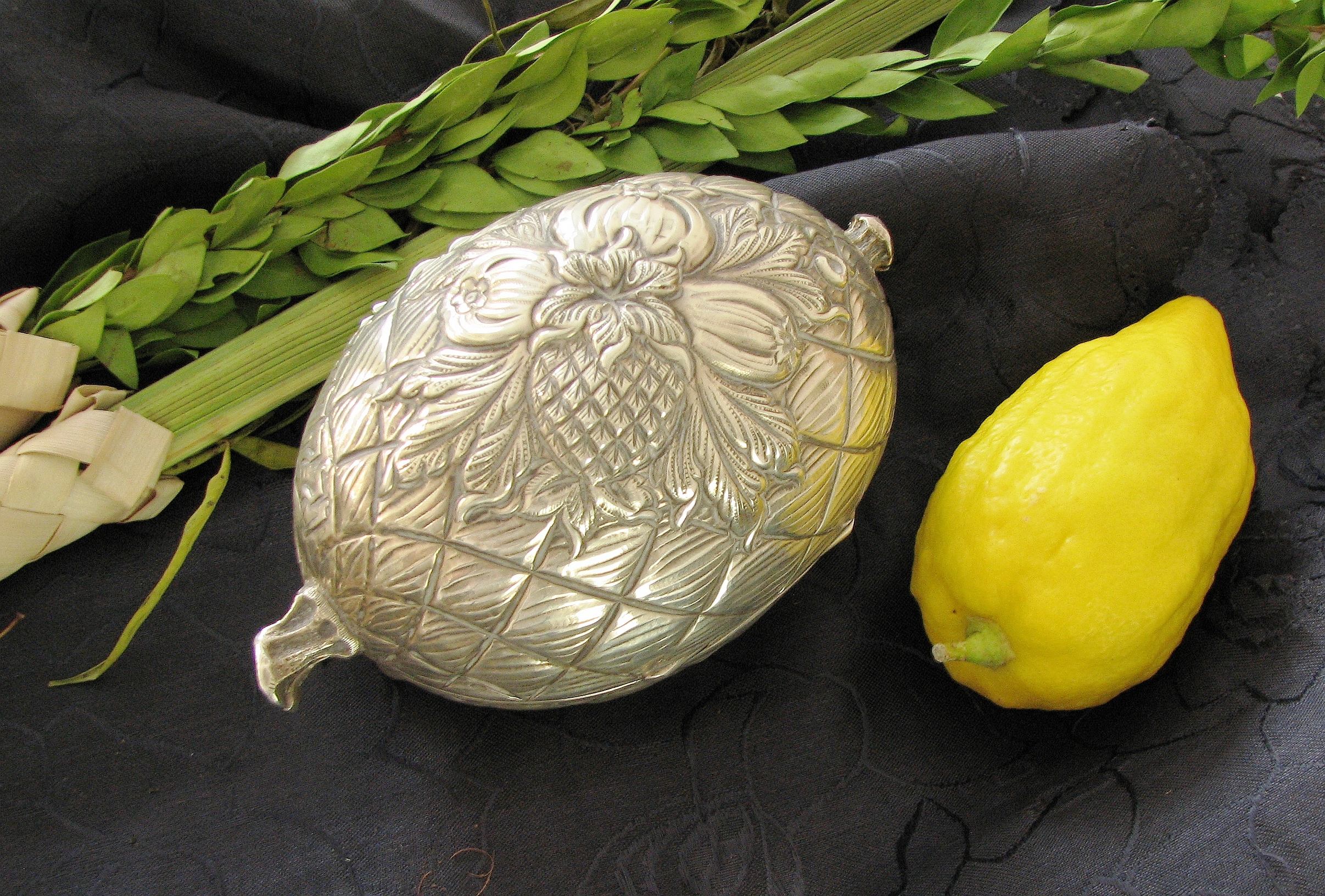
On the right: An etrog (citron) next to its etrog carrier

To protect the etrog during the holiday, it is traditionally wrapped in silky flax fibers and stored in a special decorative box, often made from silver.

After the holiday, eating the etrog or etrog jam is considered a segula (efficacious remedy) for a woman to have an easy childbirth. A common Ashkenazi custom is to save the etrog until Tu BiShvat and eat it in candied form or as succade, while offering prayers that the worshipper merit a beautiful etrog next Sukkot. Some families make jam or liqueur out of the etrog or make a pomander by inserting cloves into the skin for use as besamim at the havdalah ceremony after Shabbat.

Etrogim grown in Israel are not classified as food and are therefore not recommended to be eaten due to the large amount of pesticides used in their agriculture.

== Gallery ==
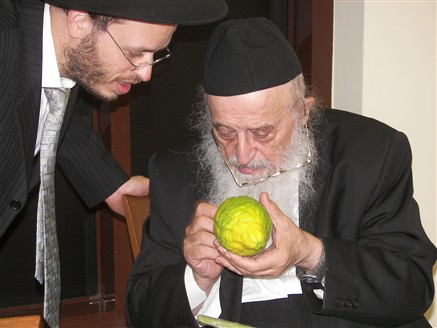
Rabbi Bergman re-examines an etrog for a student.

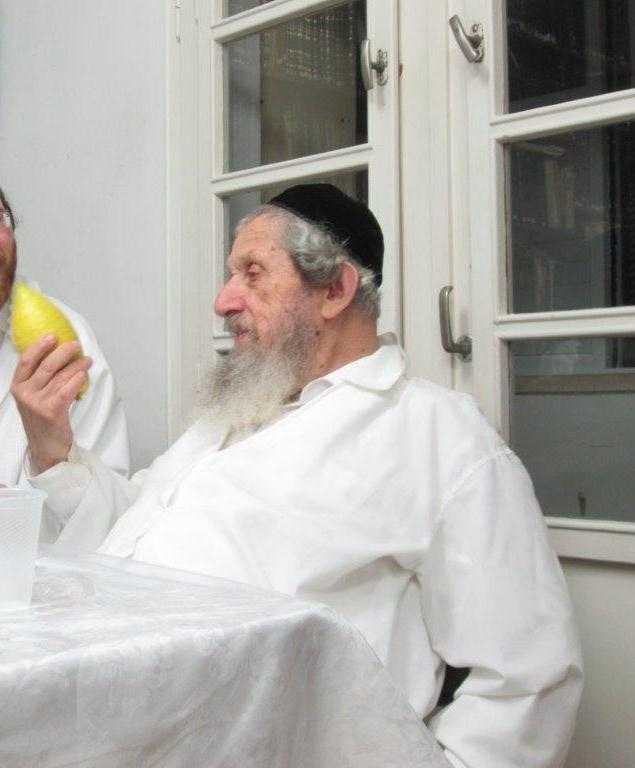
Rabbi Dov Landau inspecting an etrog

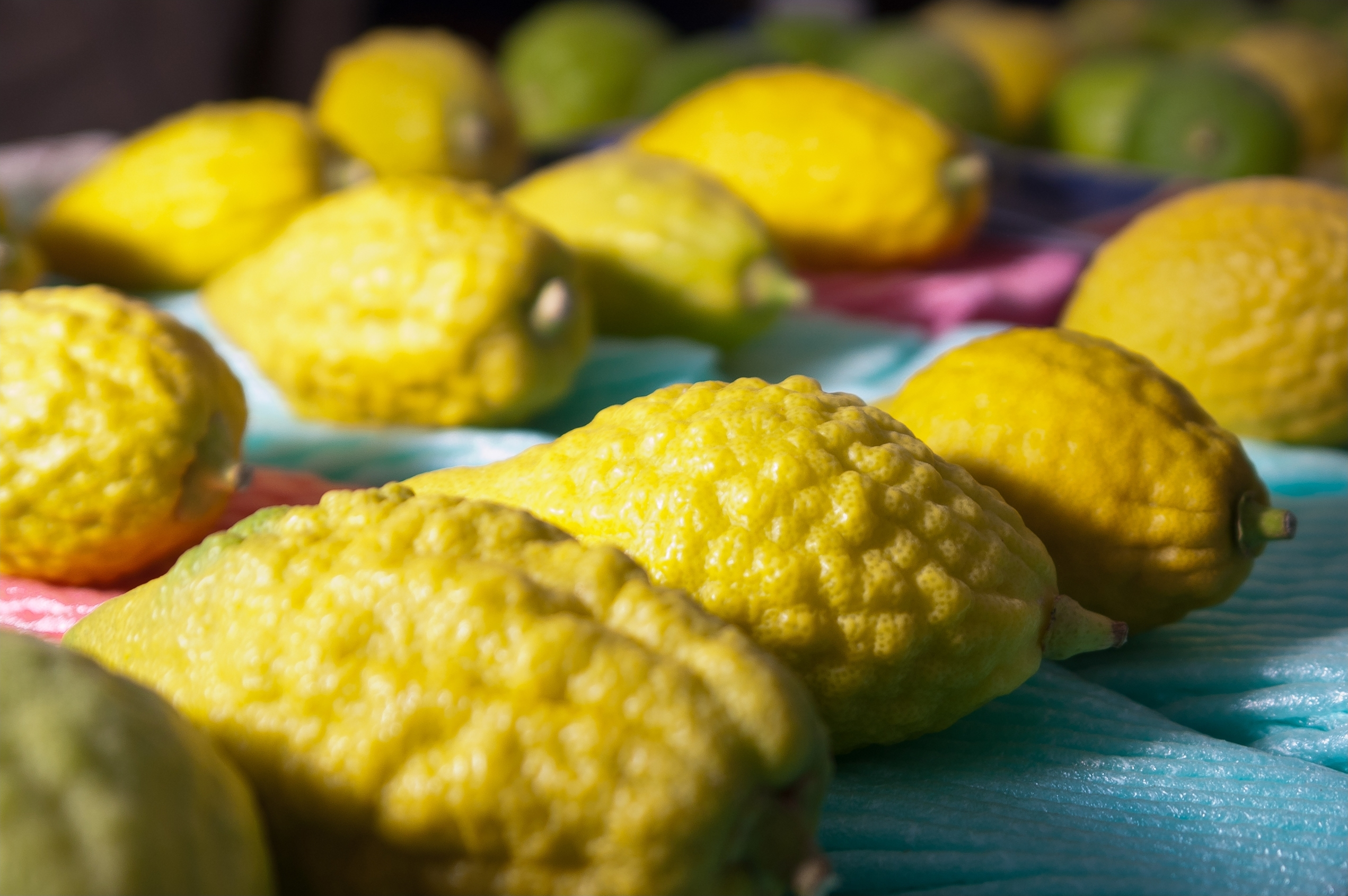
Balady citron in Bnei Berak market

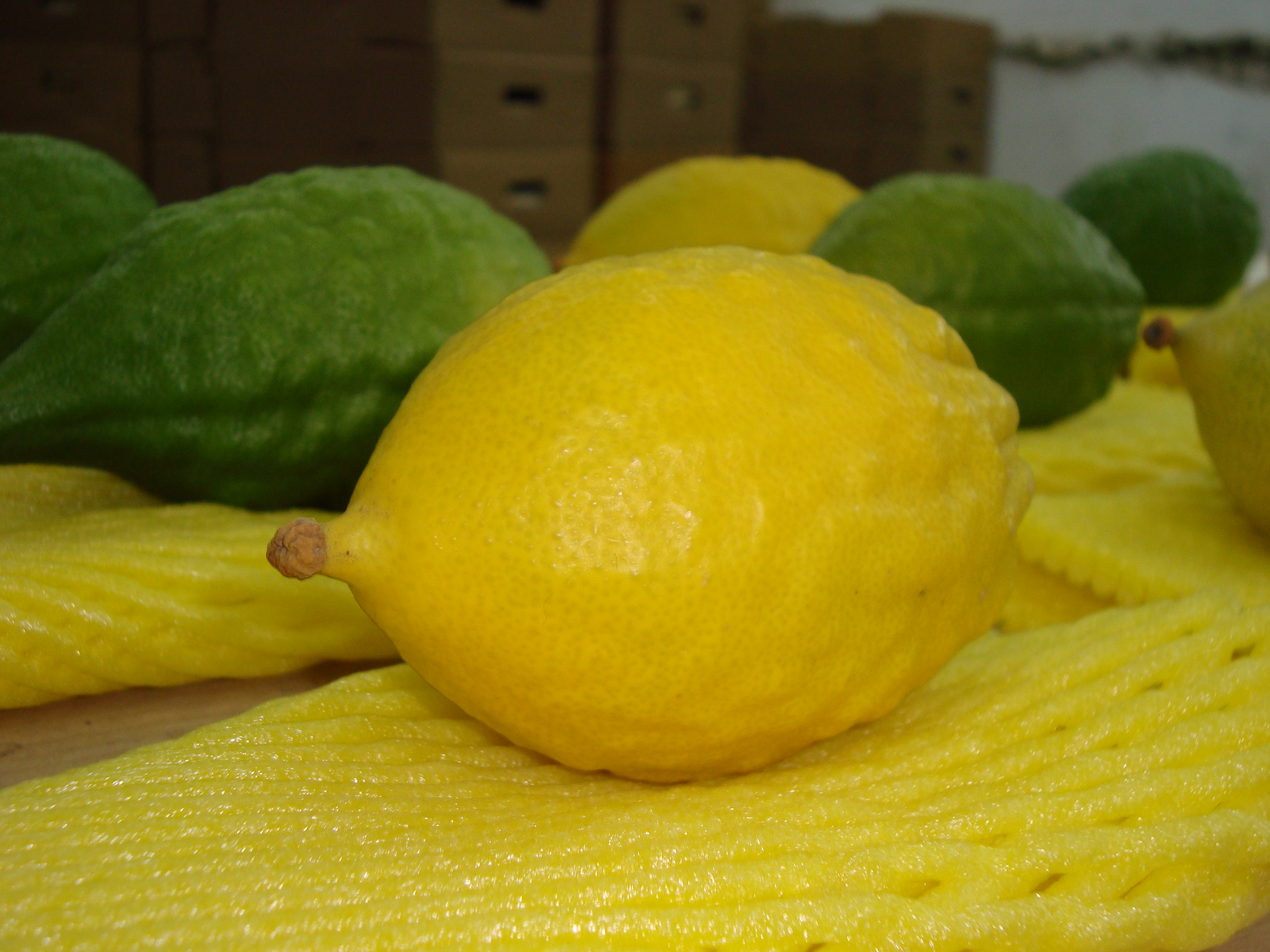
Yanova etrog for sale

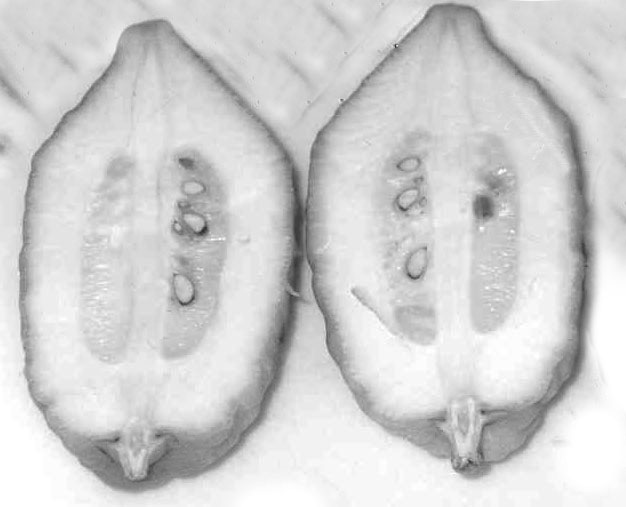
Cross section of Diamante citron, to check for genetic purity

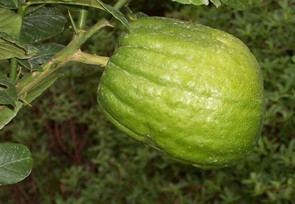
Mature fruit of Yanover etrog

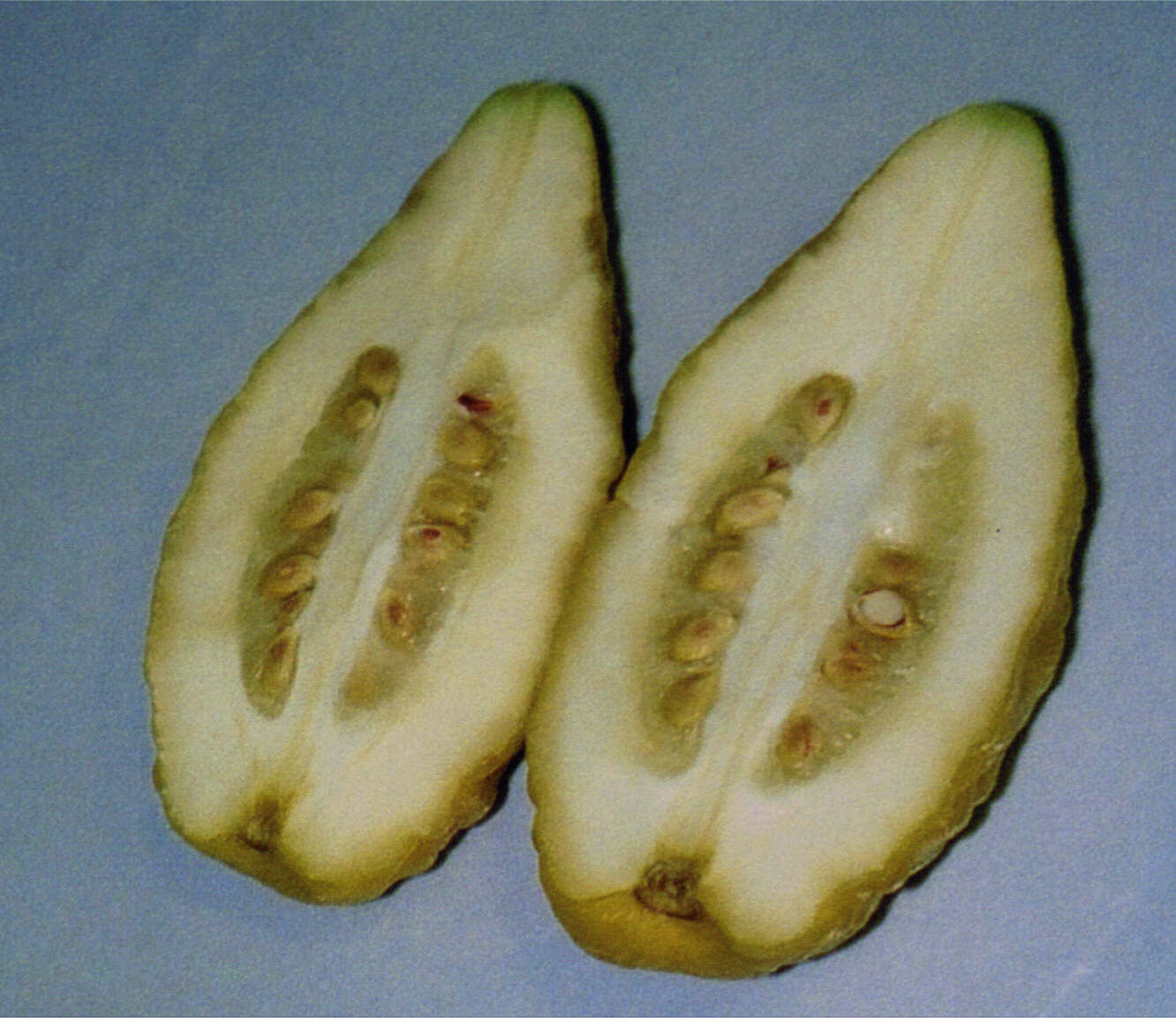
Cross section of Braverman etrog

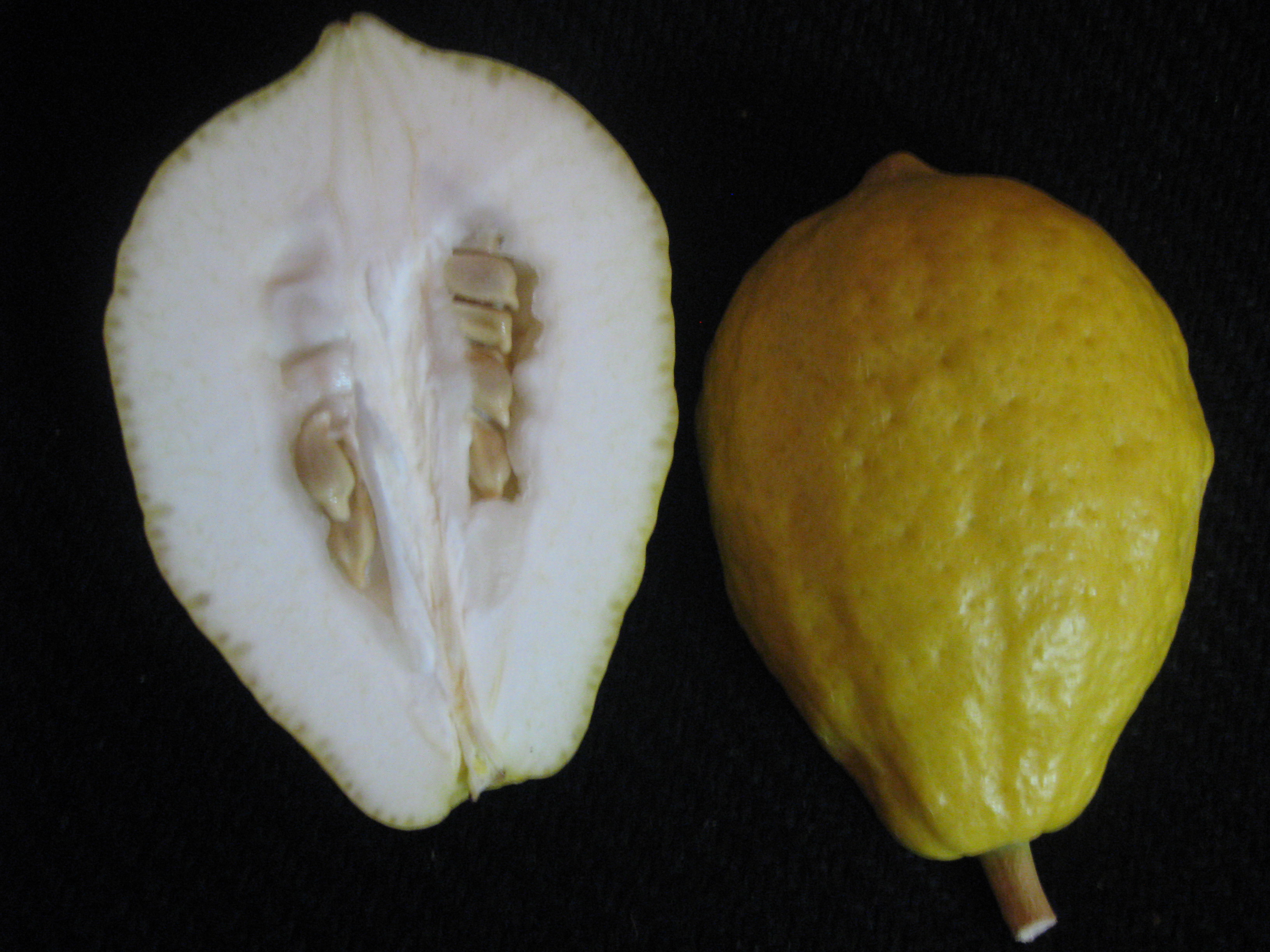
Cross section in Yemenite citron

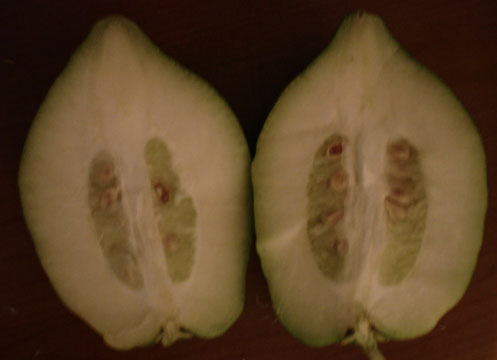
Cross section of Greek citron

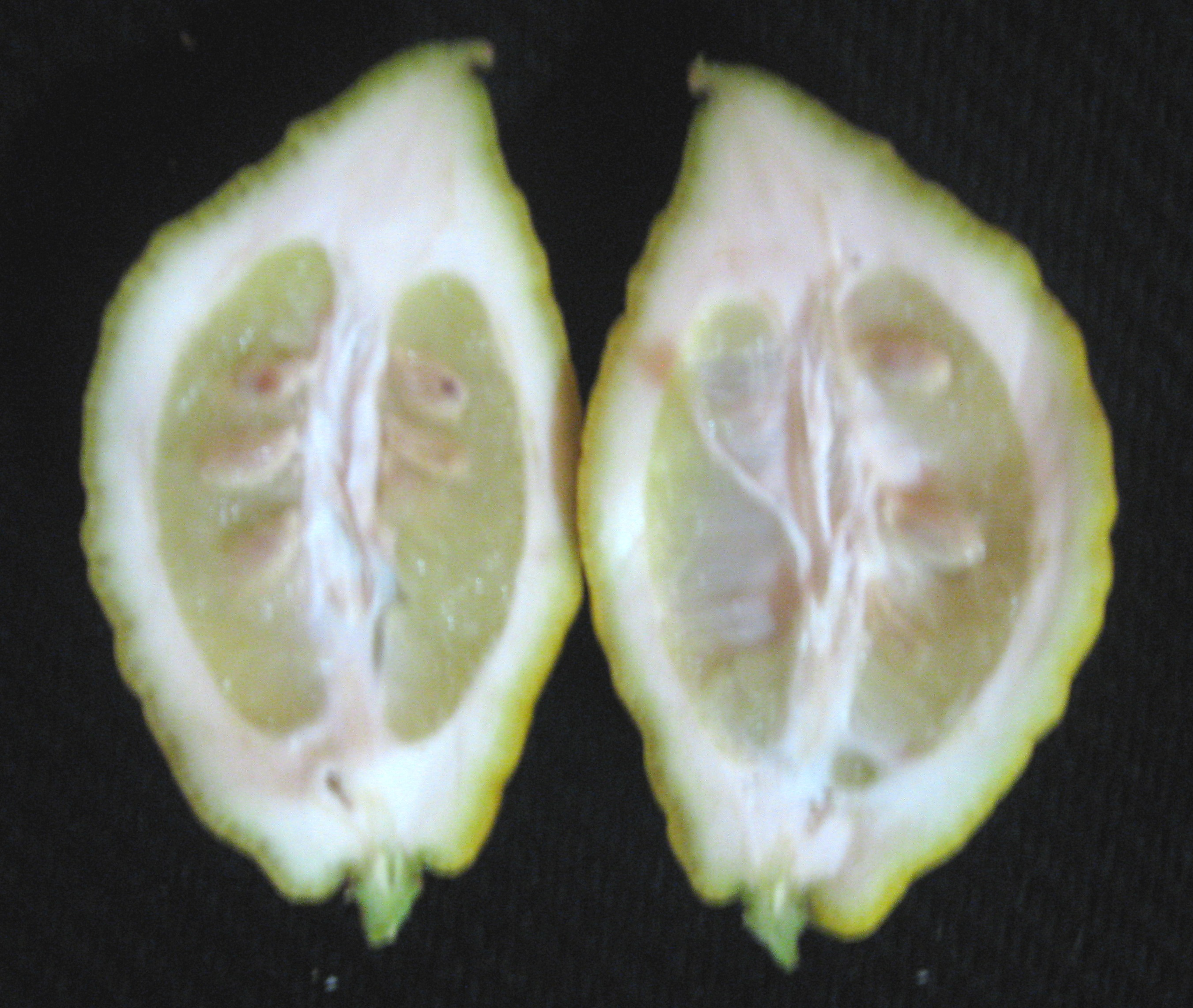
Cross section of Balady citron

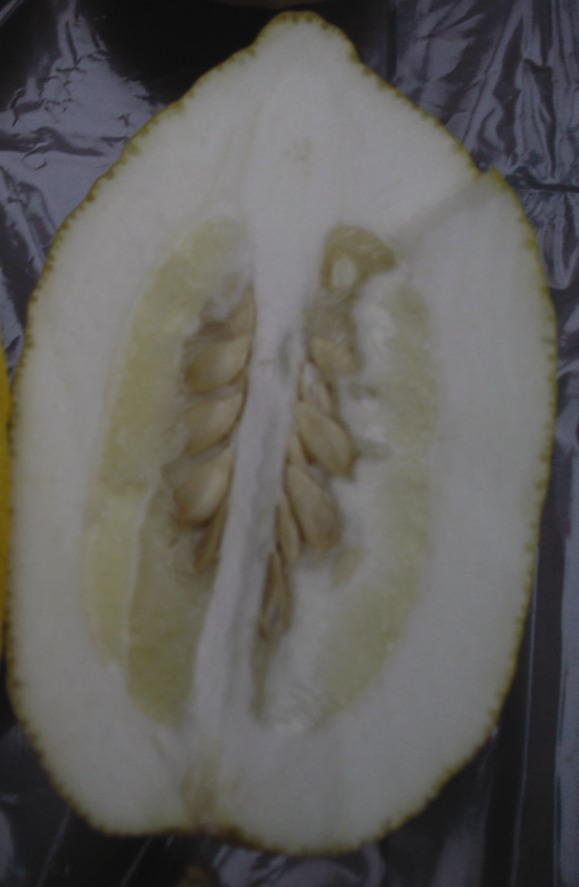
Cross section of a Moroccan citron

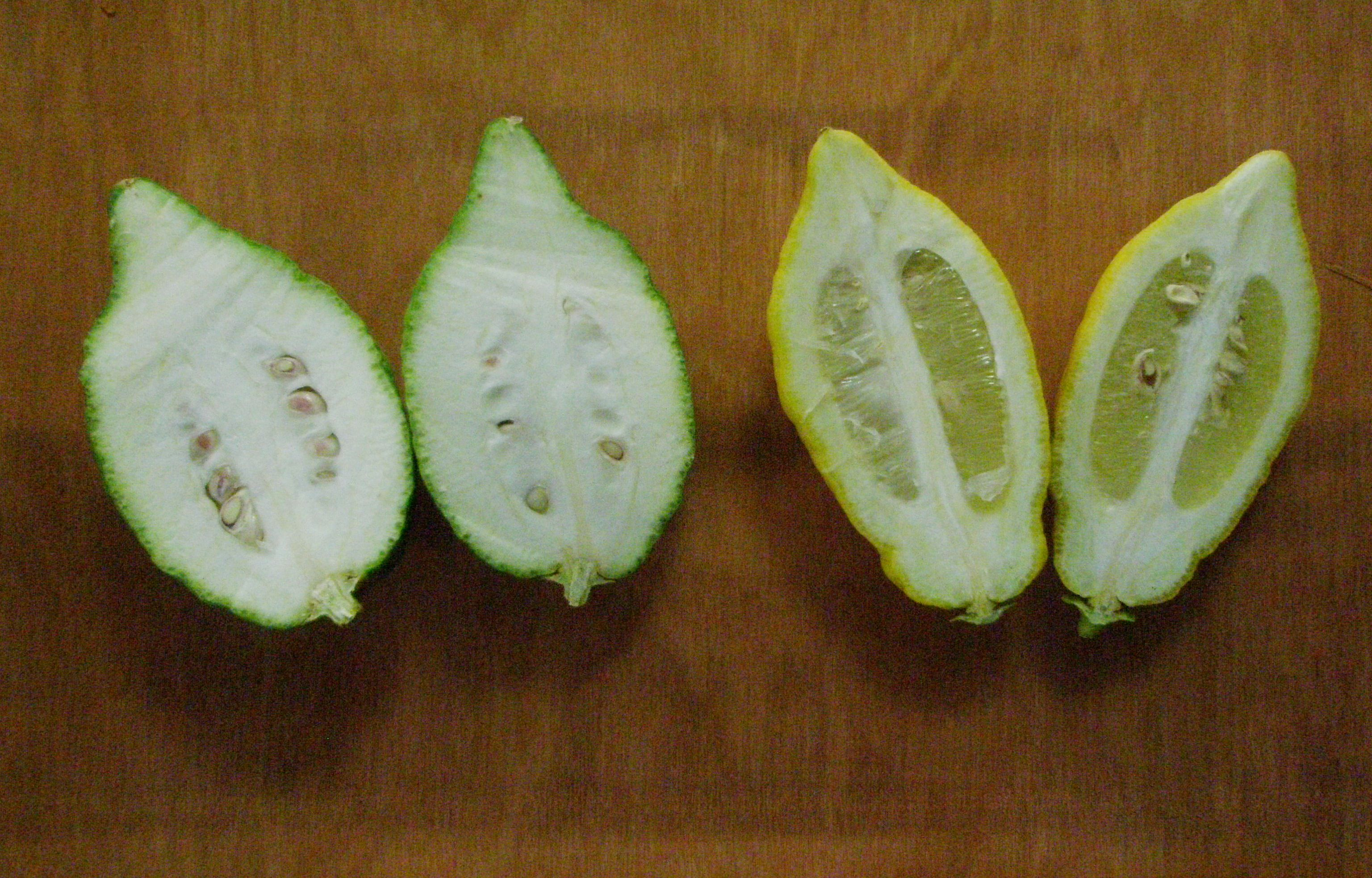
Yemenite citron (left) and a Balady citron (right)

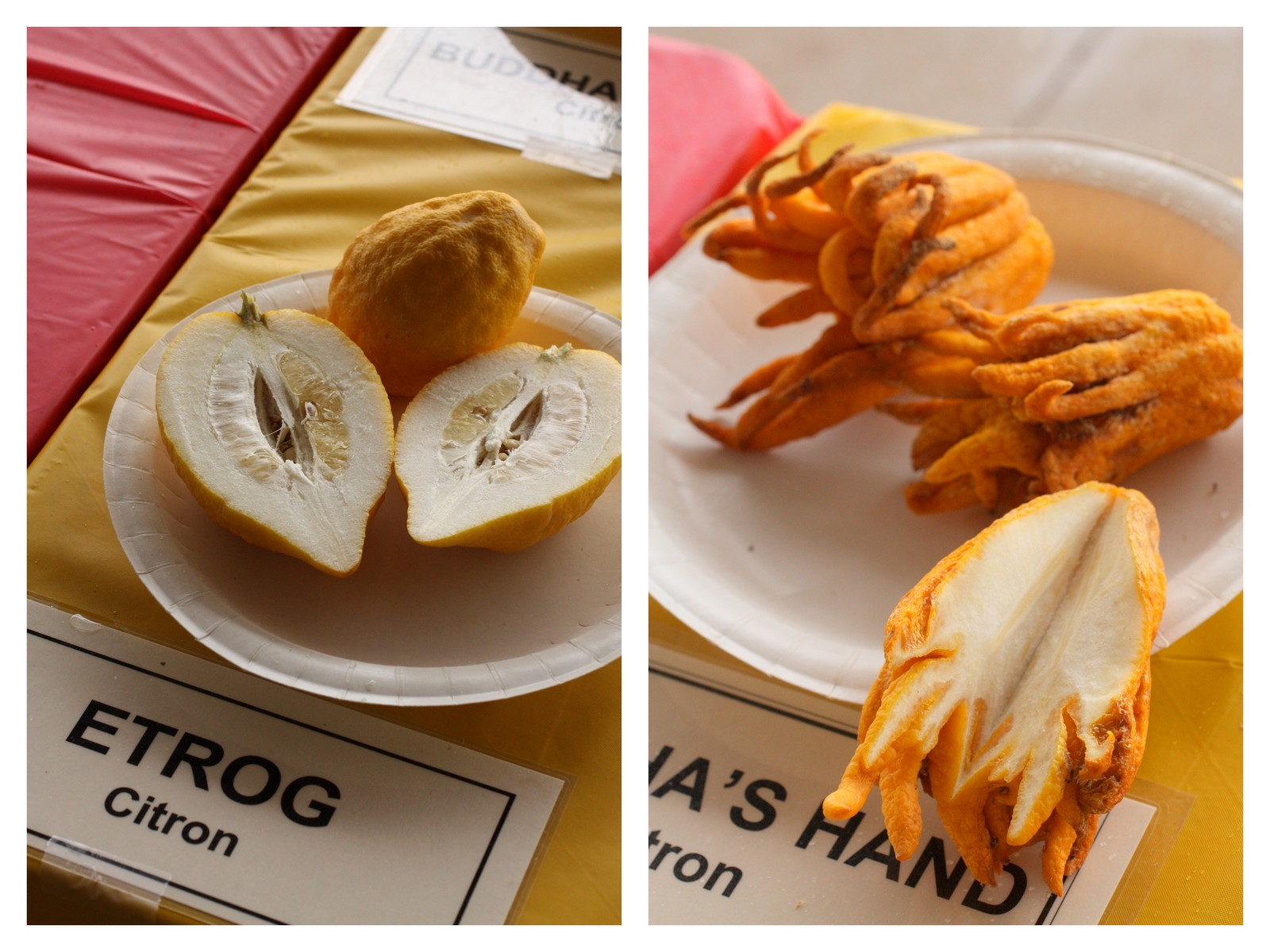
Cross section of variety etrog citron, and in fingered citron

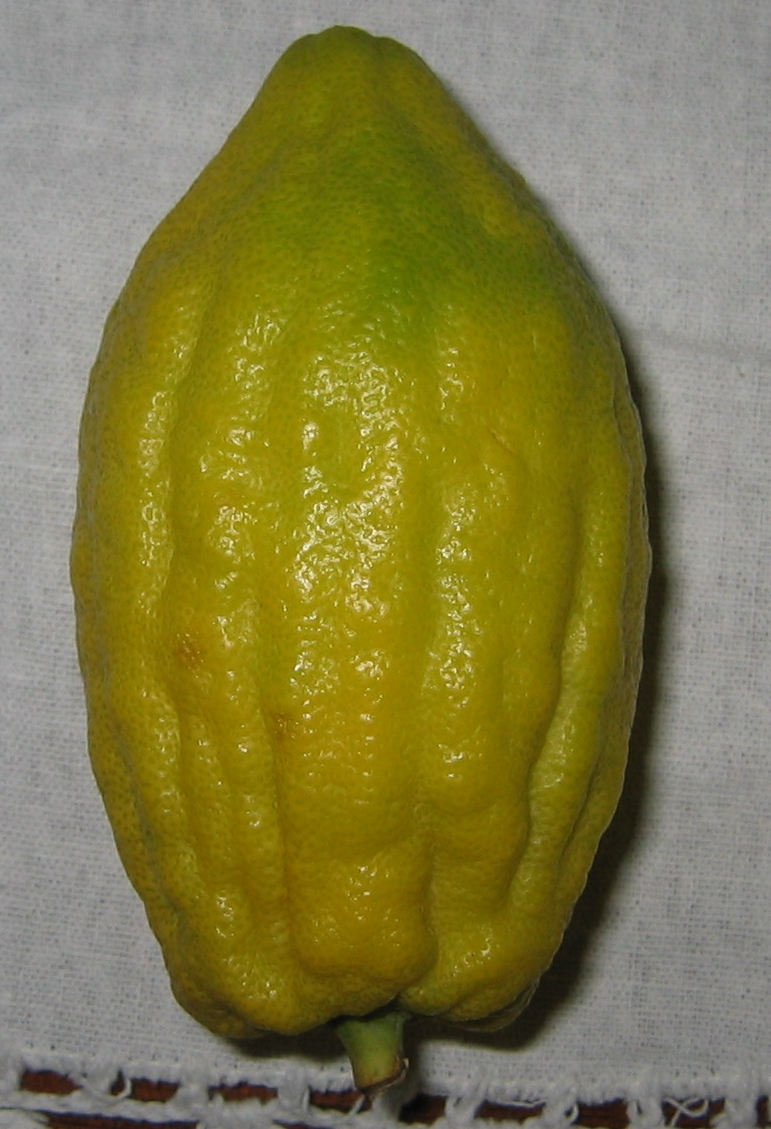
Diamante citron without pitam

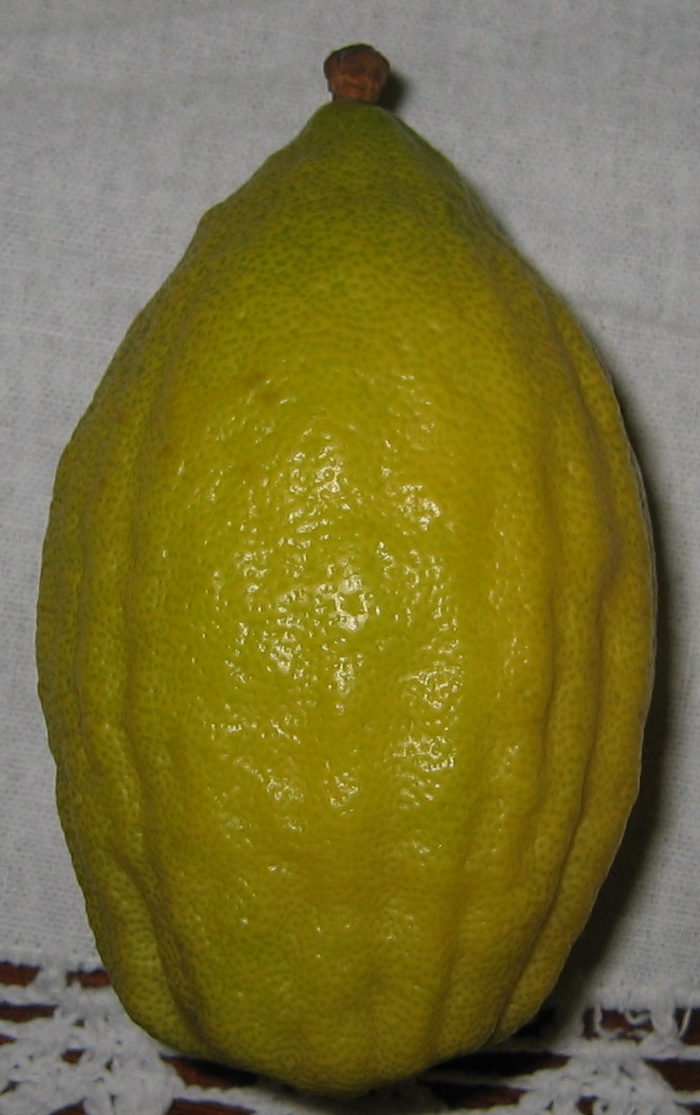
Diamante citron with pitam

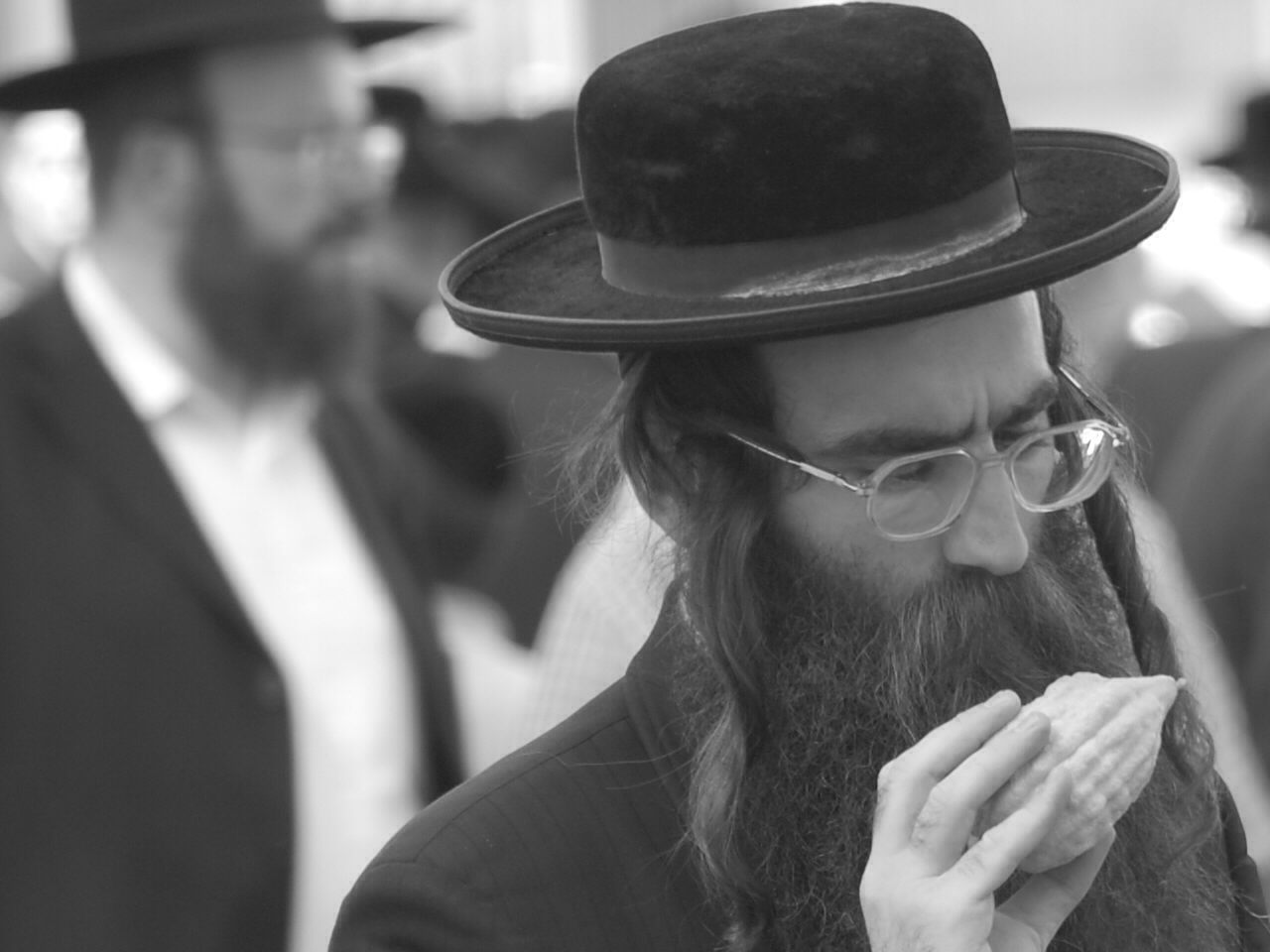
Inspecting an etrog for flaws

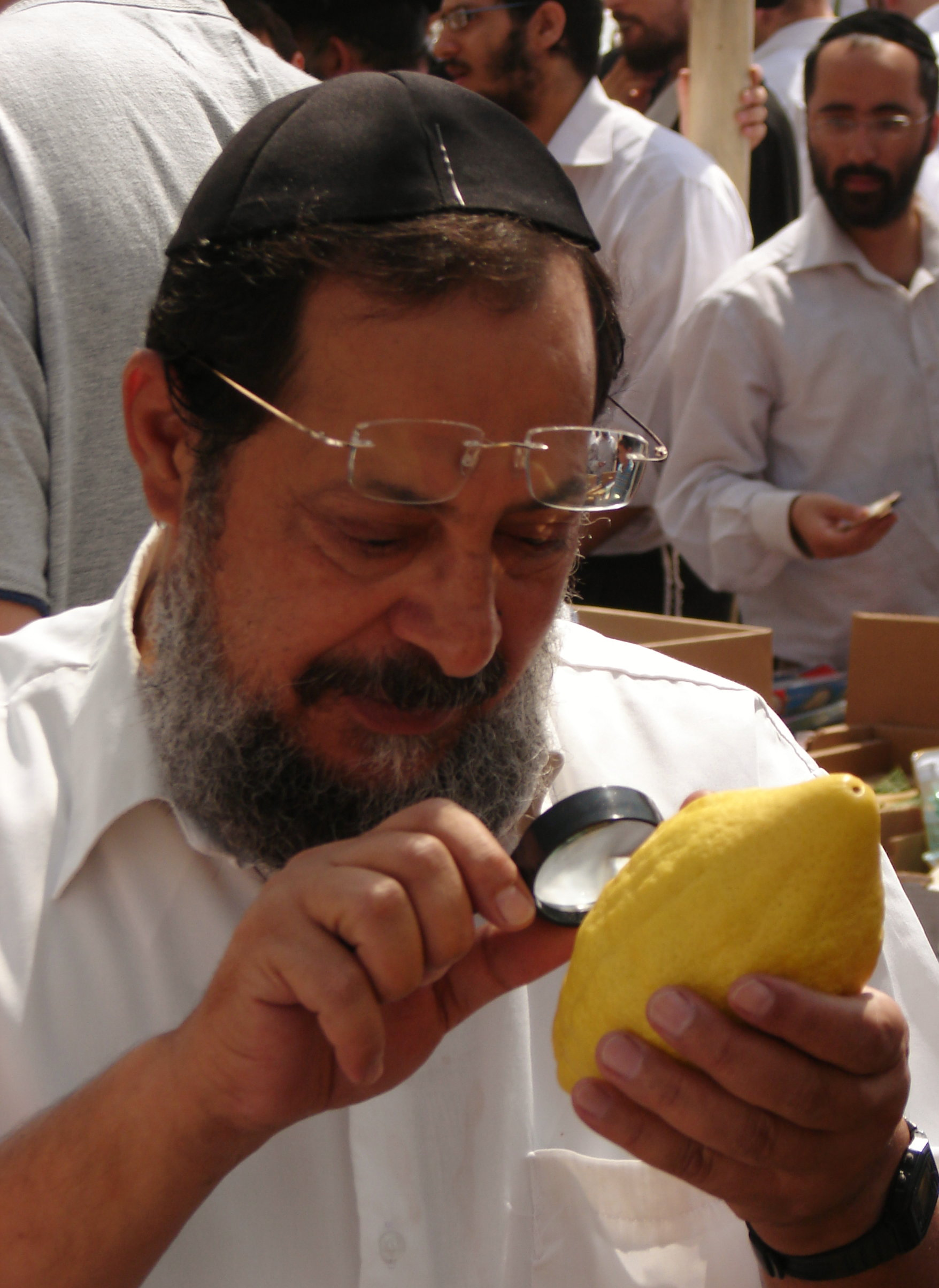
Inspecting a Yemenite citron

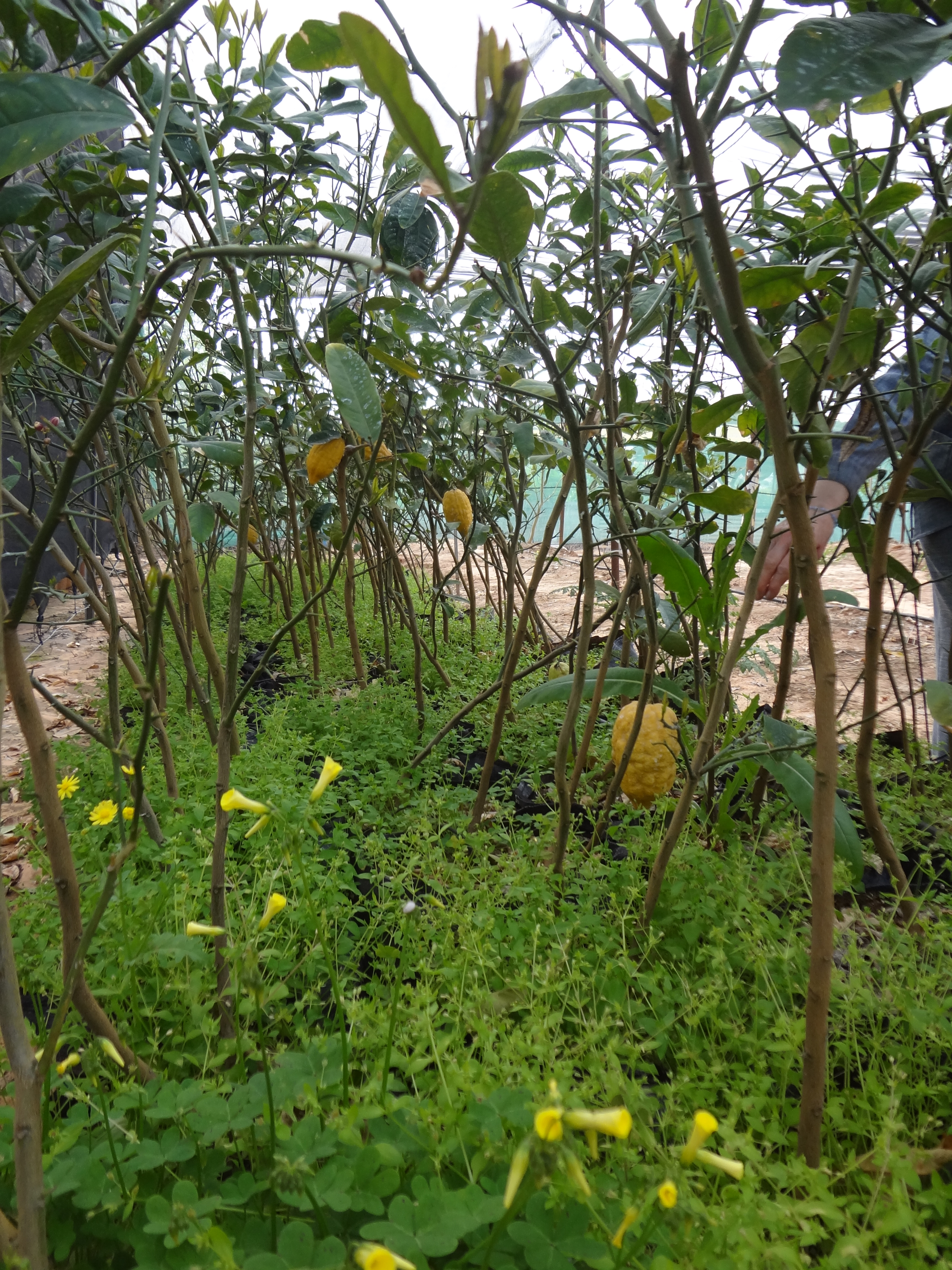
Shmita in Kefar Chabad, orchard left untended

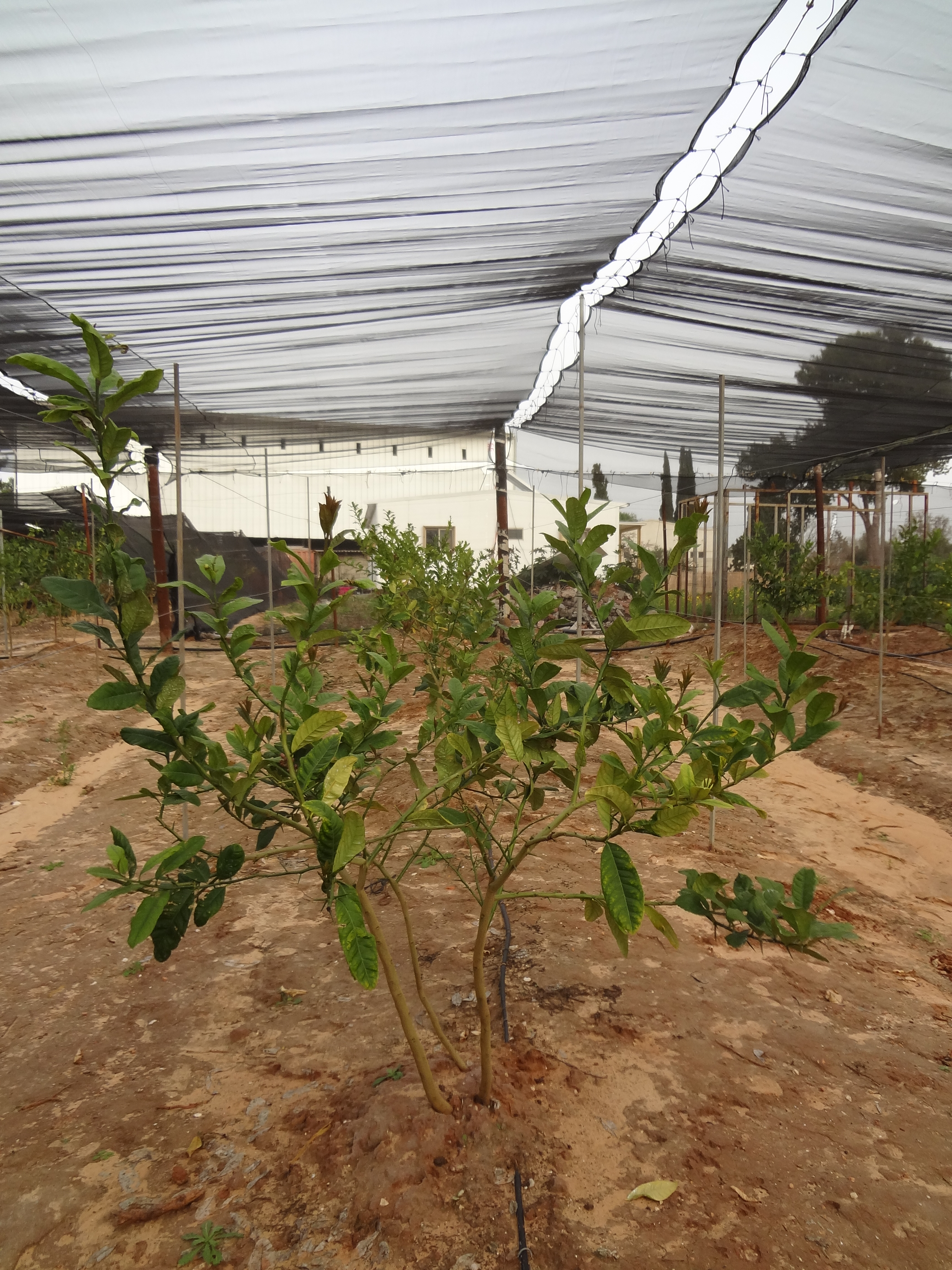
Young plants in Kefar Chabad

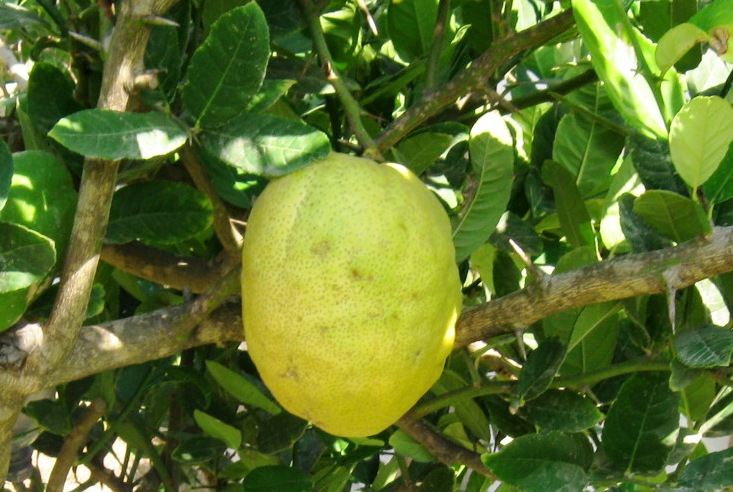
Yemenite citron on tree

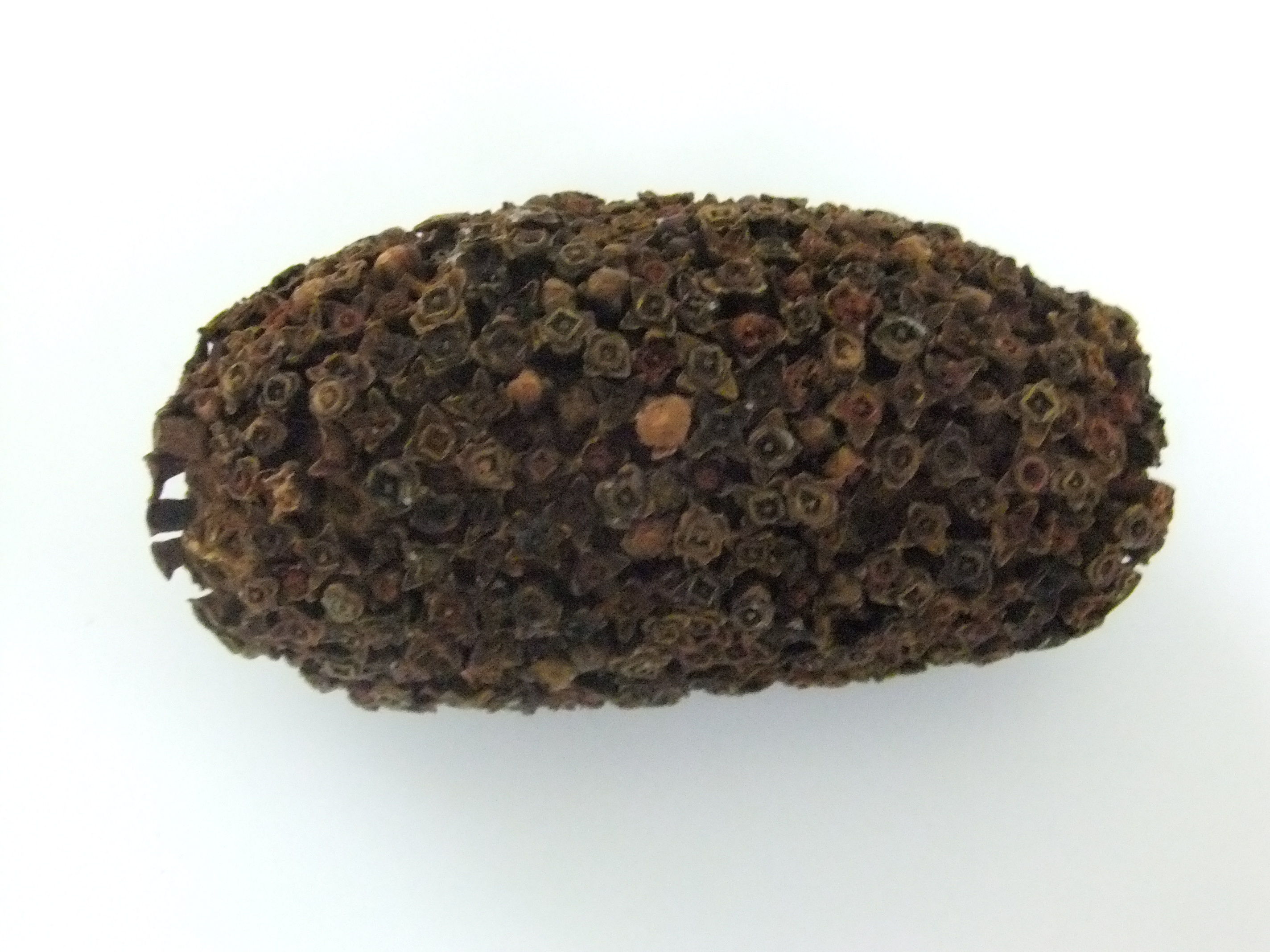
Etrog covered with cloves

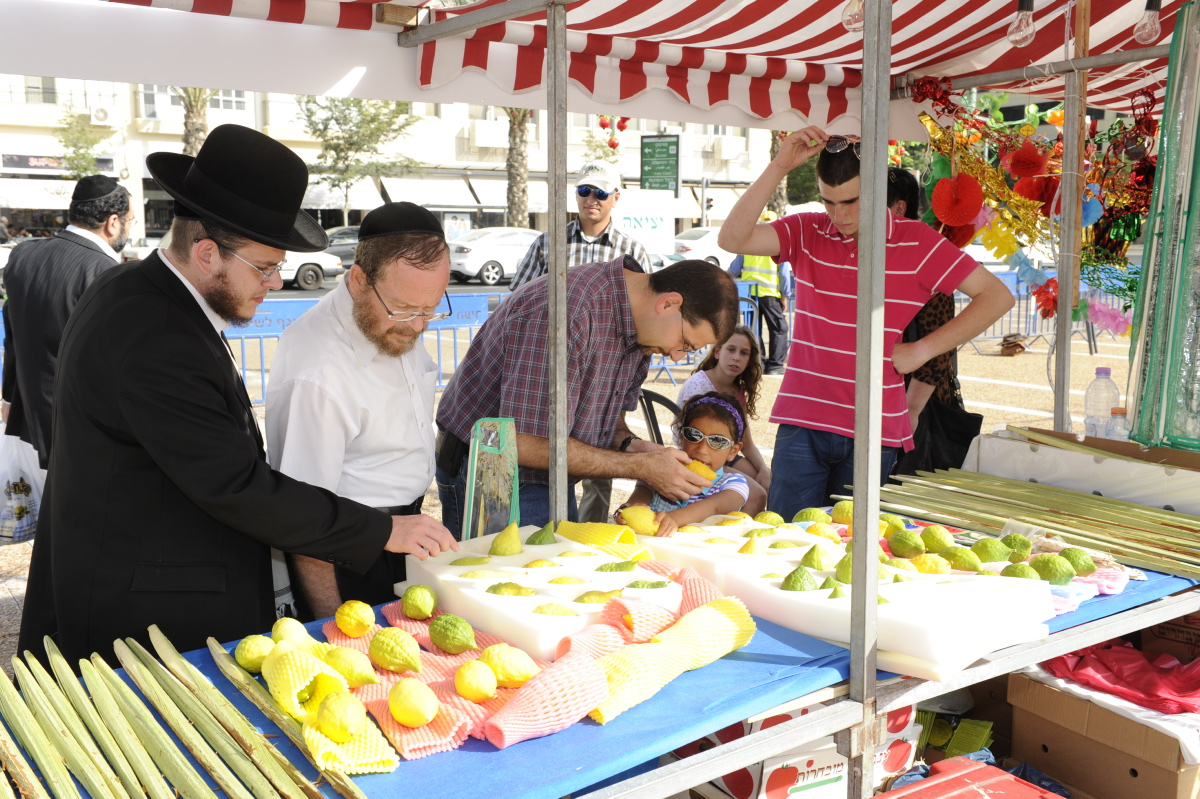
Four species market in Tel Aviv

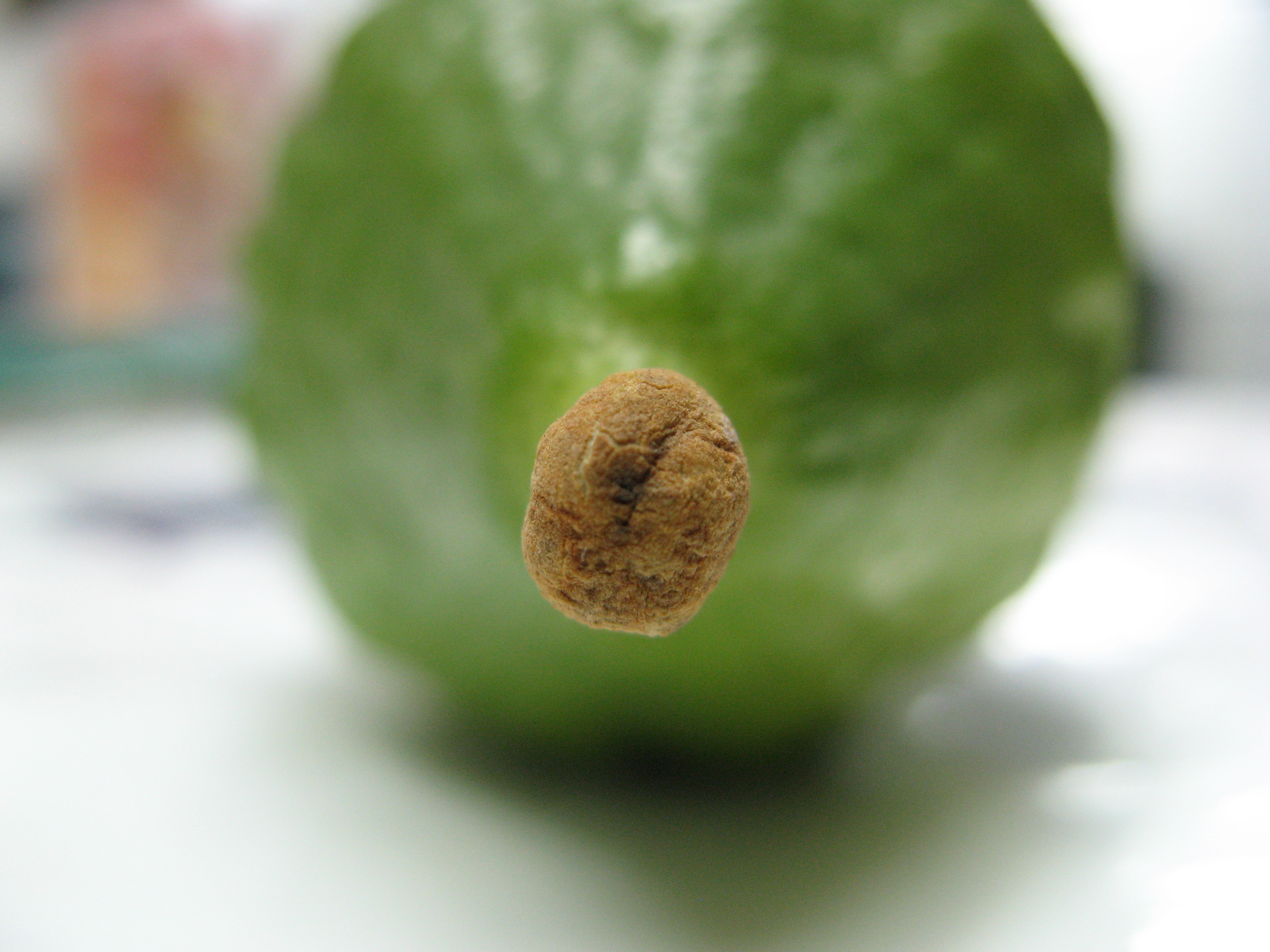
Pitam close-up

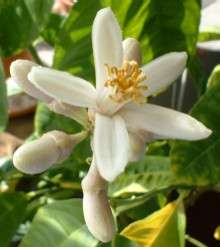
Etrog blossom

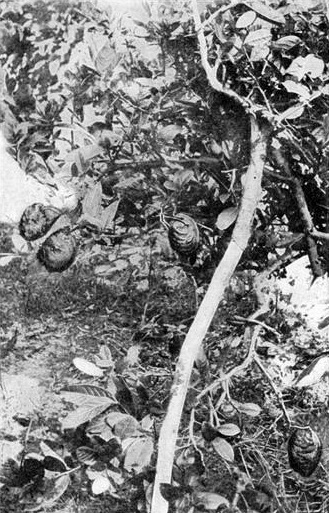
Etrog tree from Jewish Encyclopedia

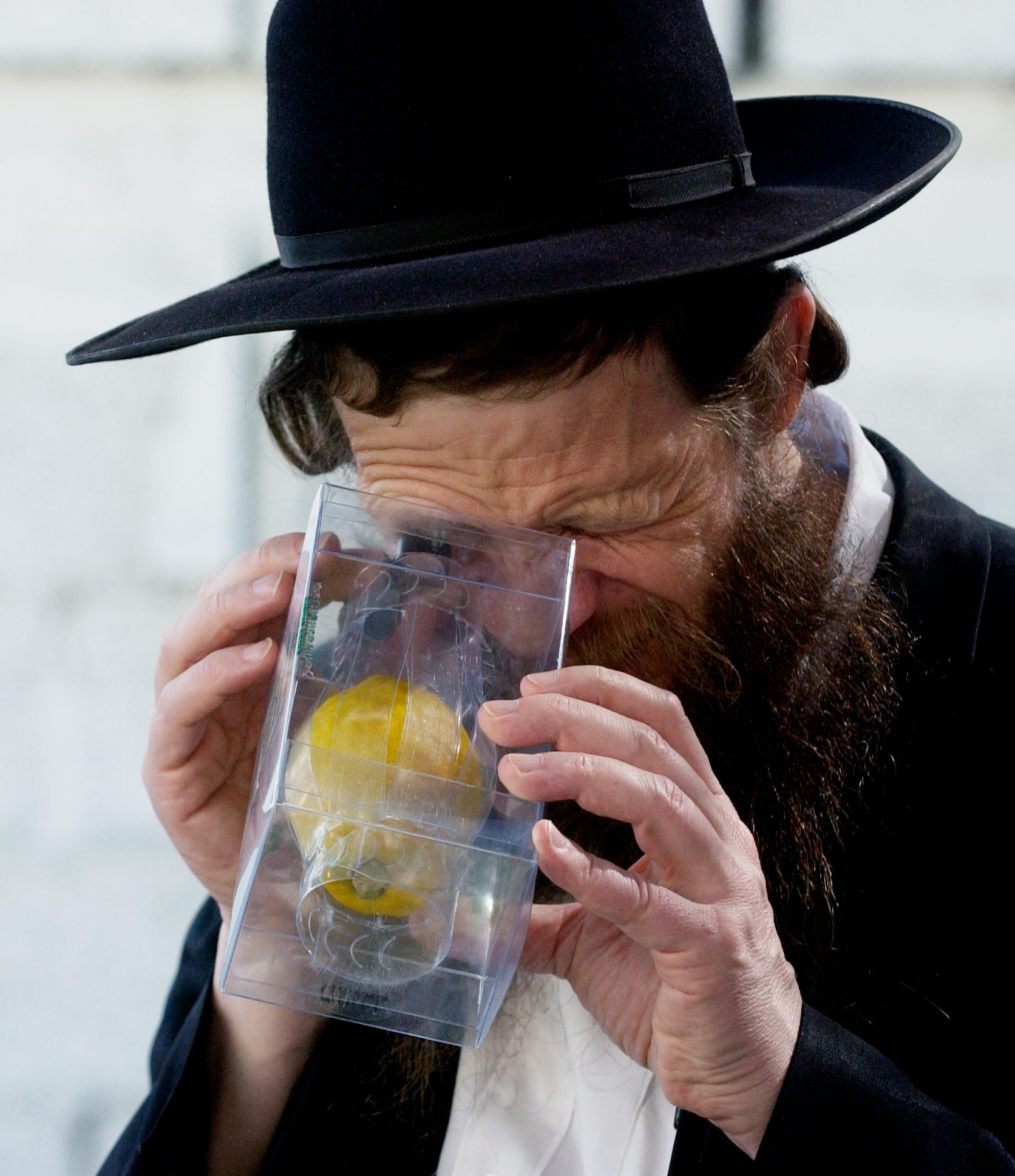
Man in Mea Shearim inspecting etrog

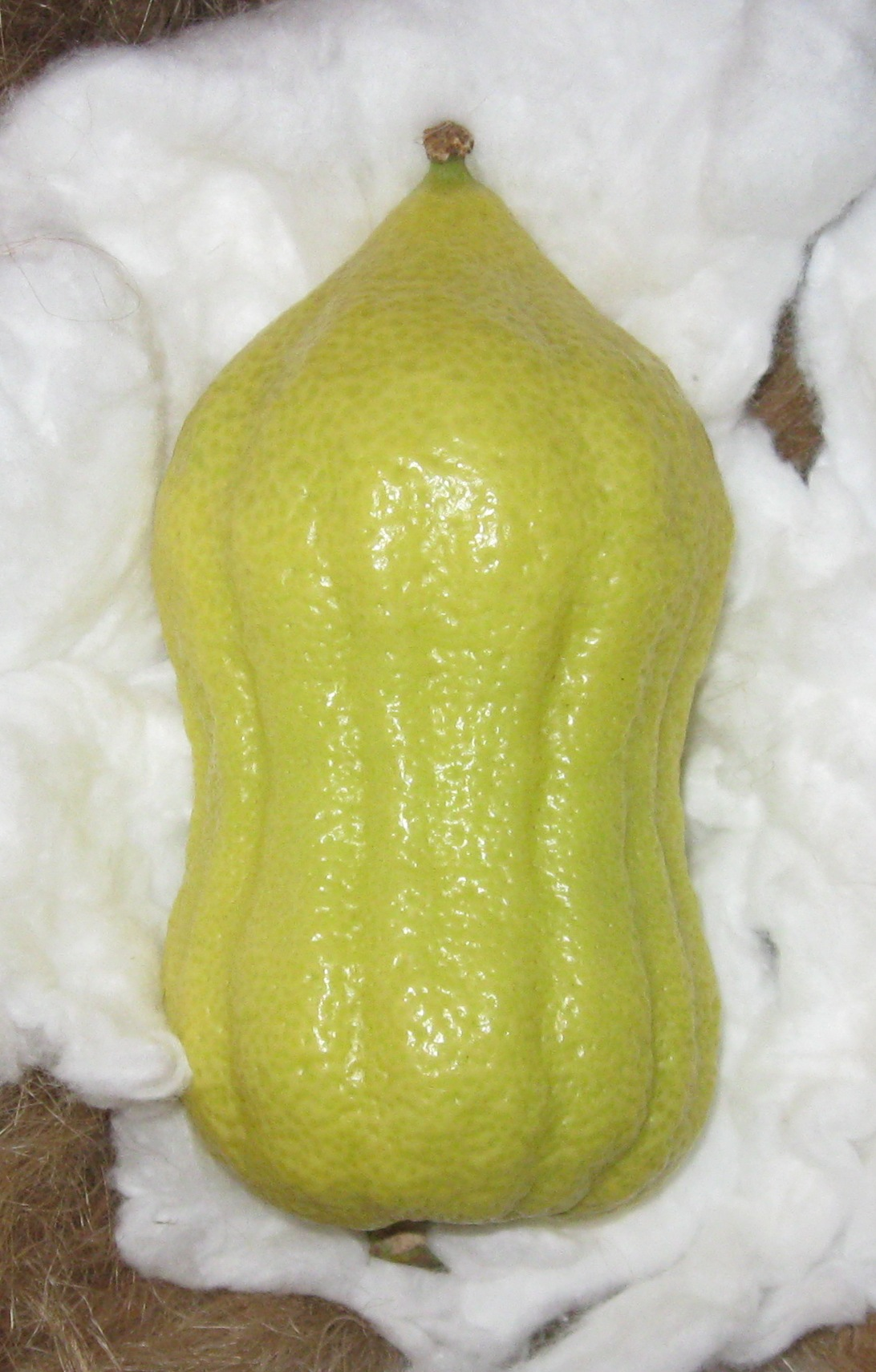
Moroccan etrog with prominent gartel

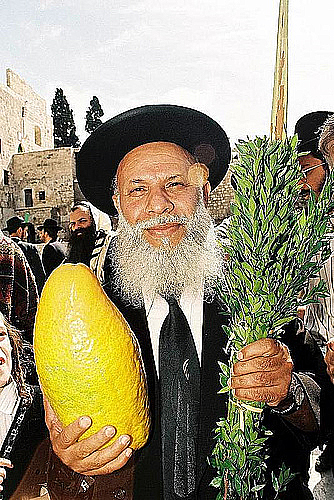
At the Western Wall

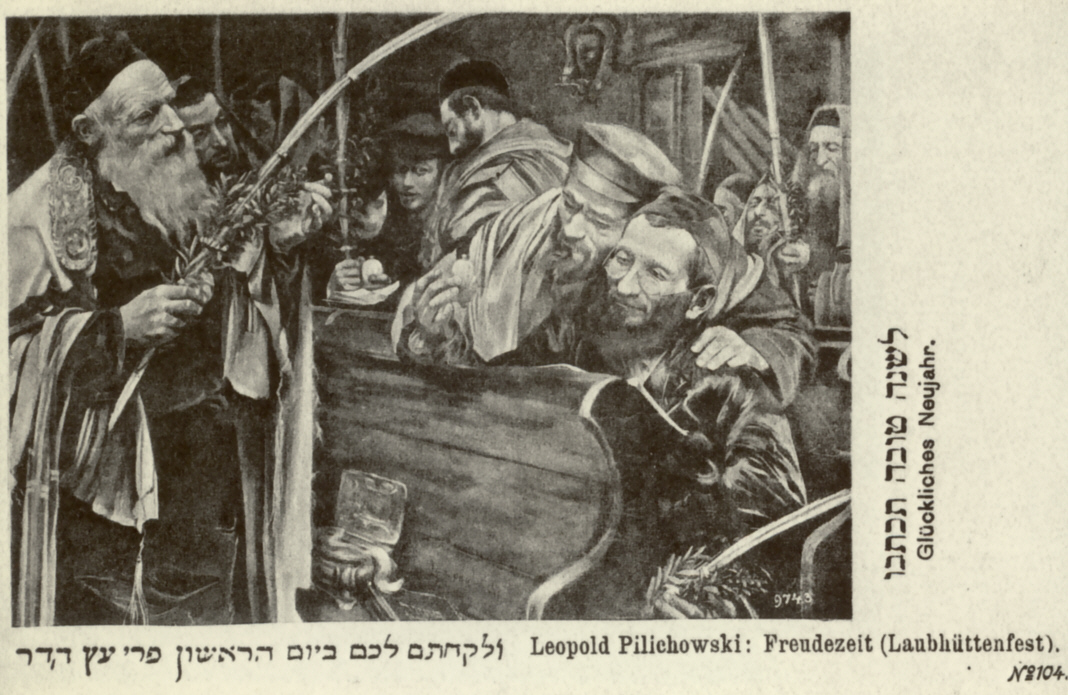
German painting

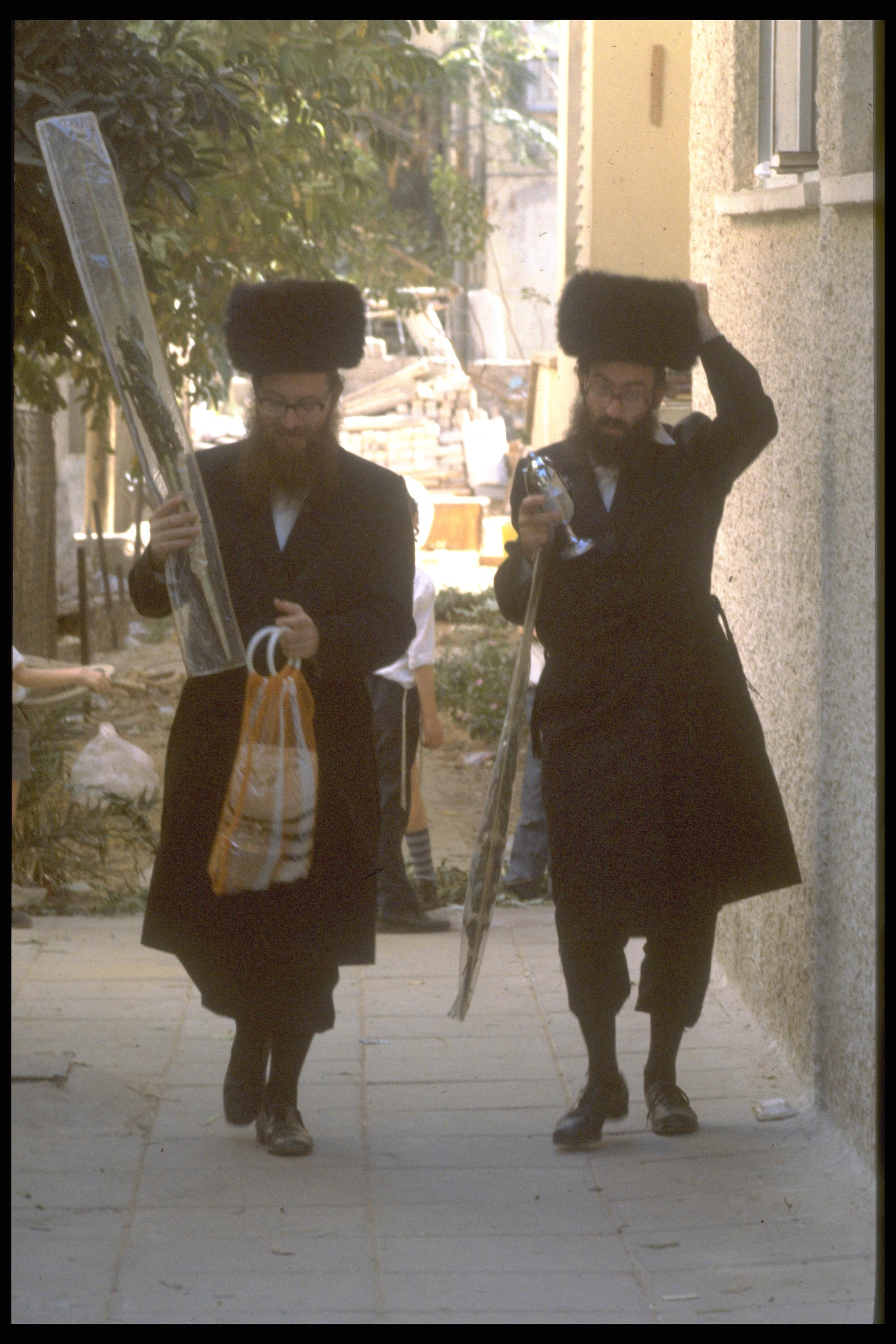
Two Hasidim in Bnei Berak

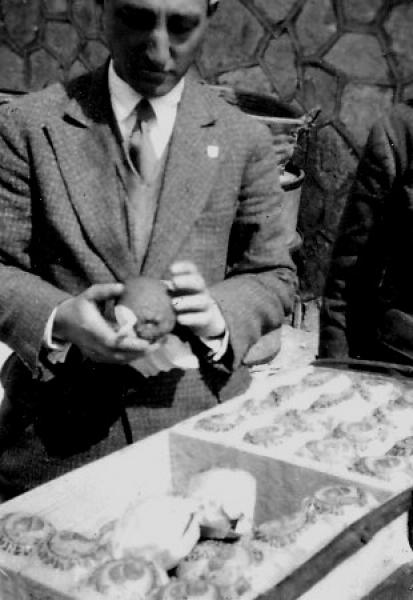
Old photo of grower

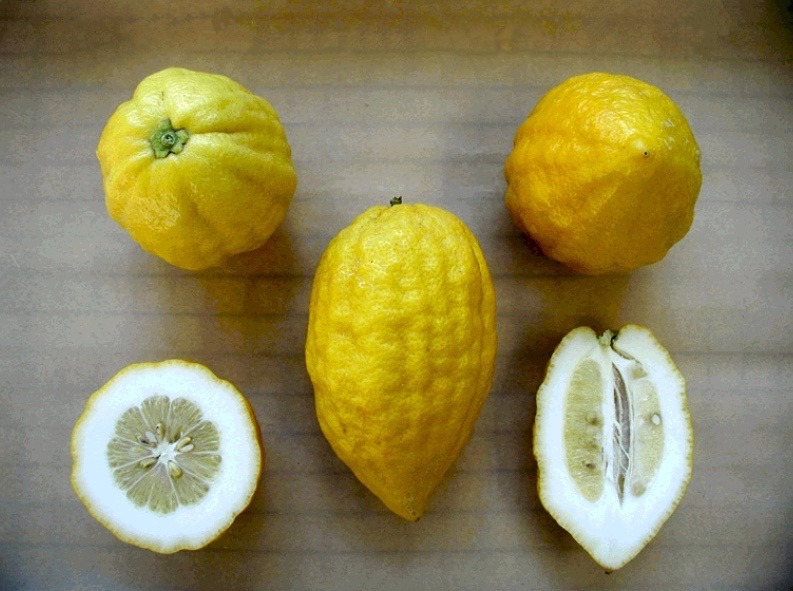
An etrog from many angles

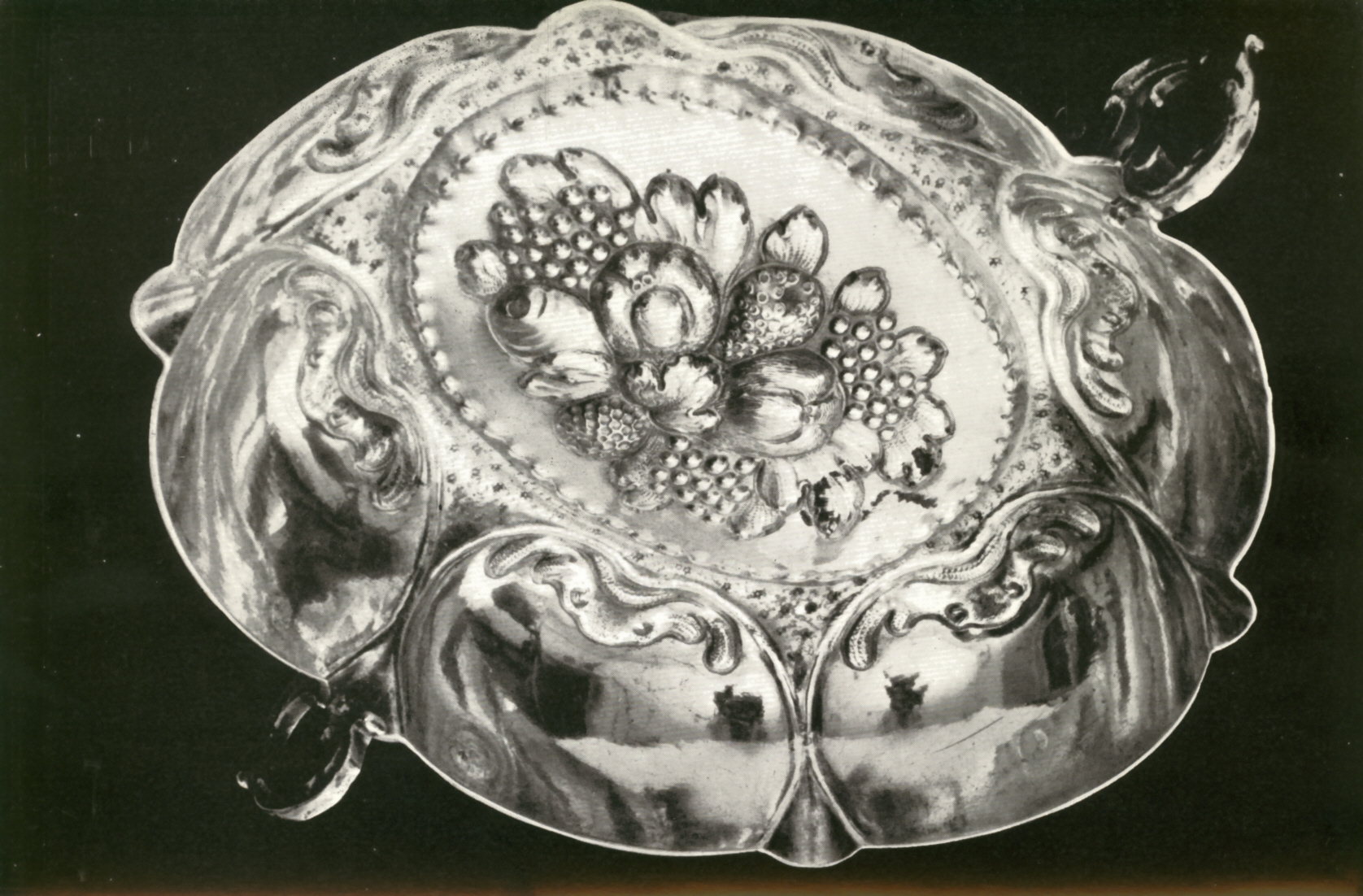
Round silver etrog box

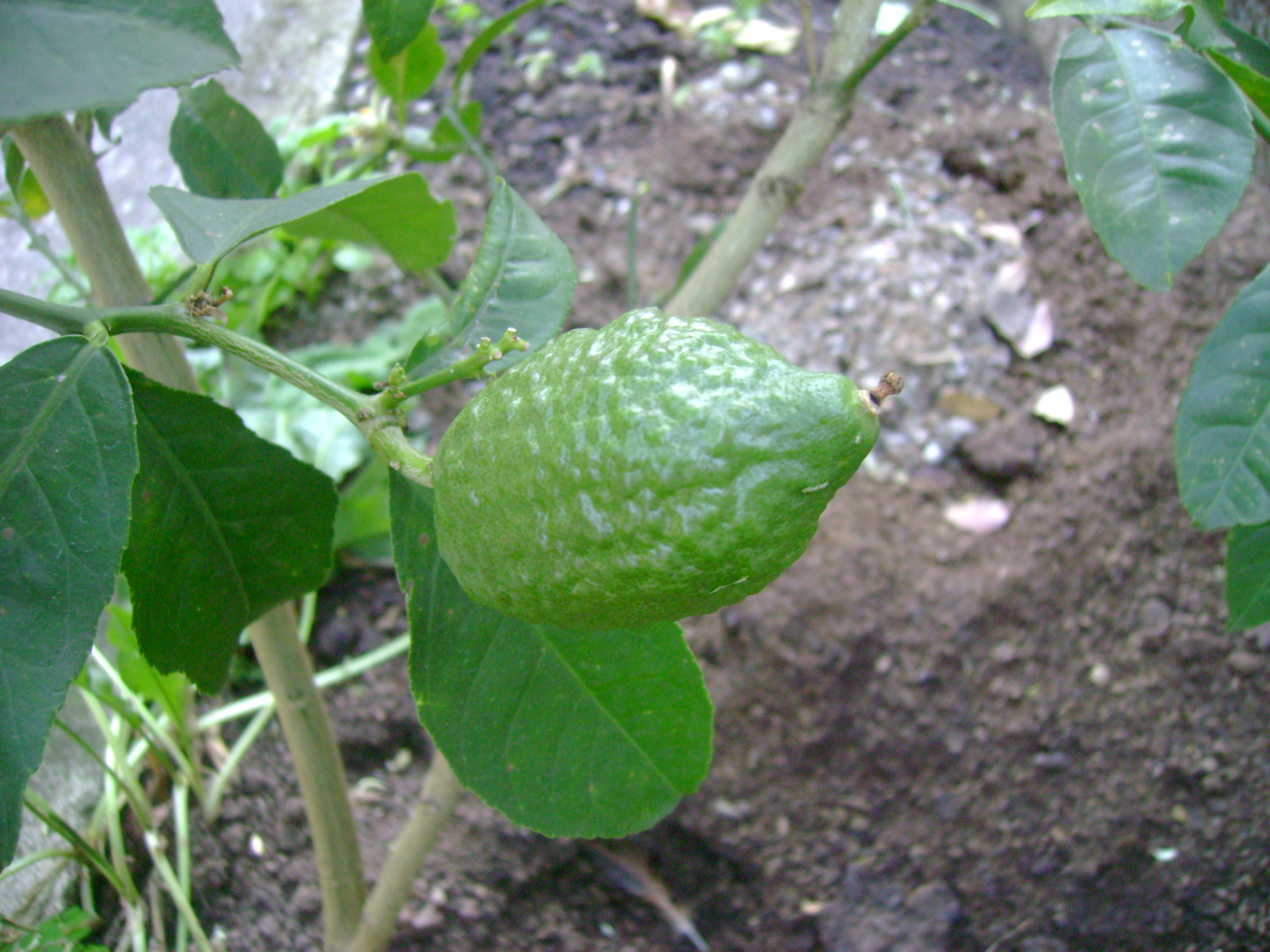
Etrog with half-dried pitam

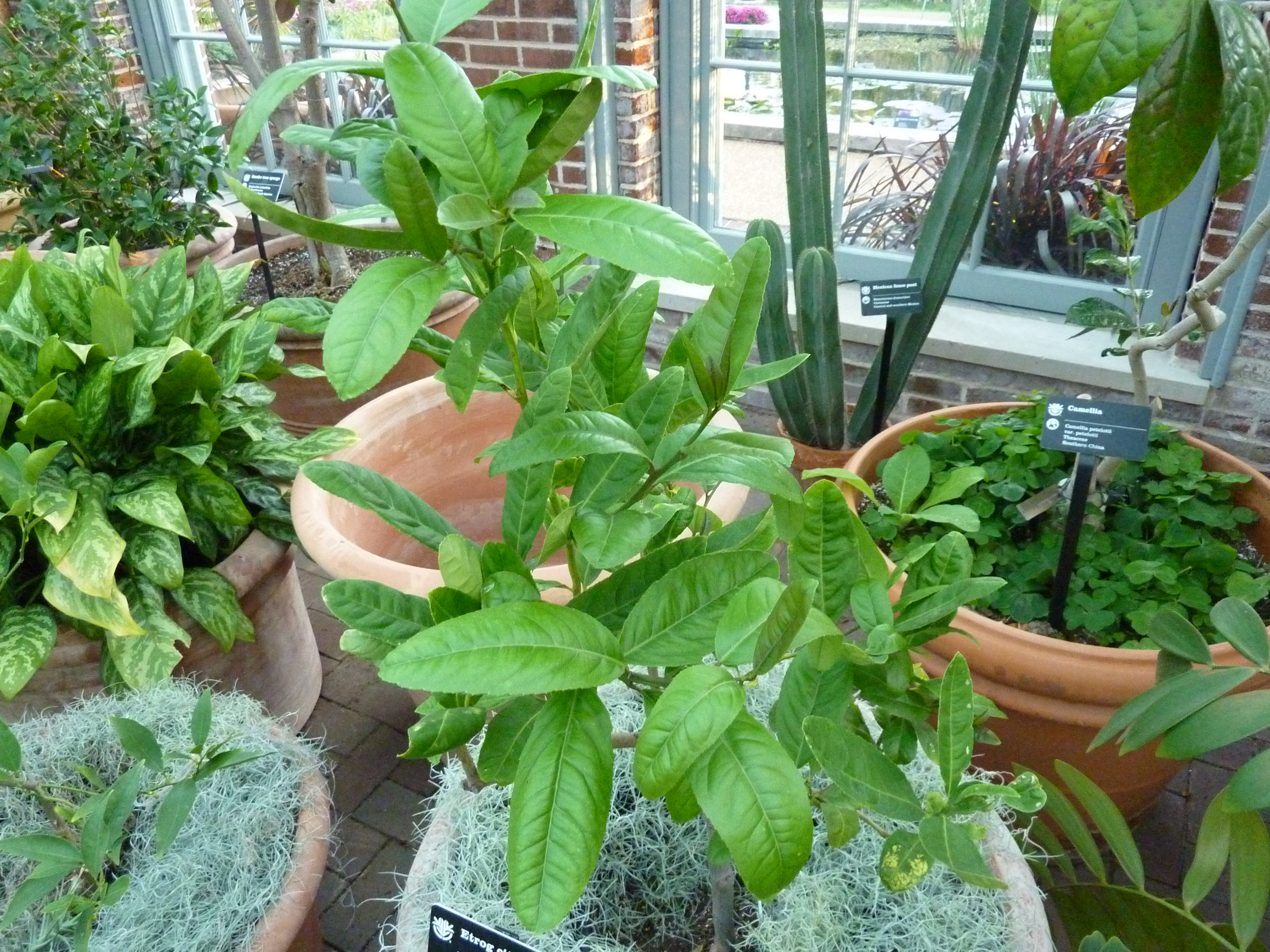
Etrog plants in nursery

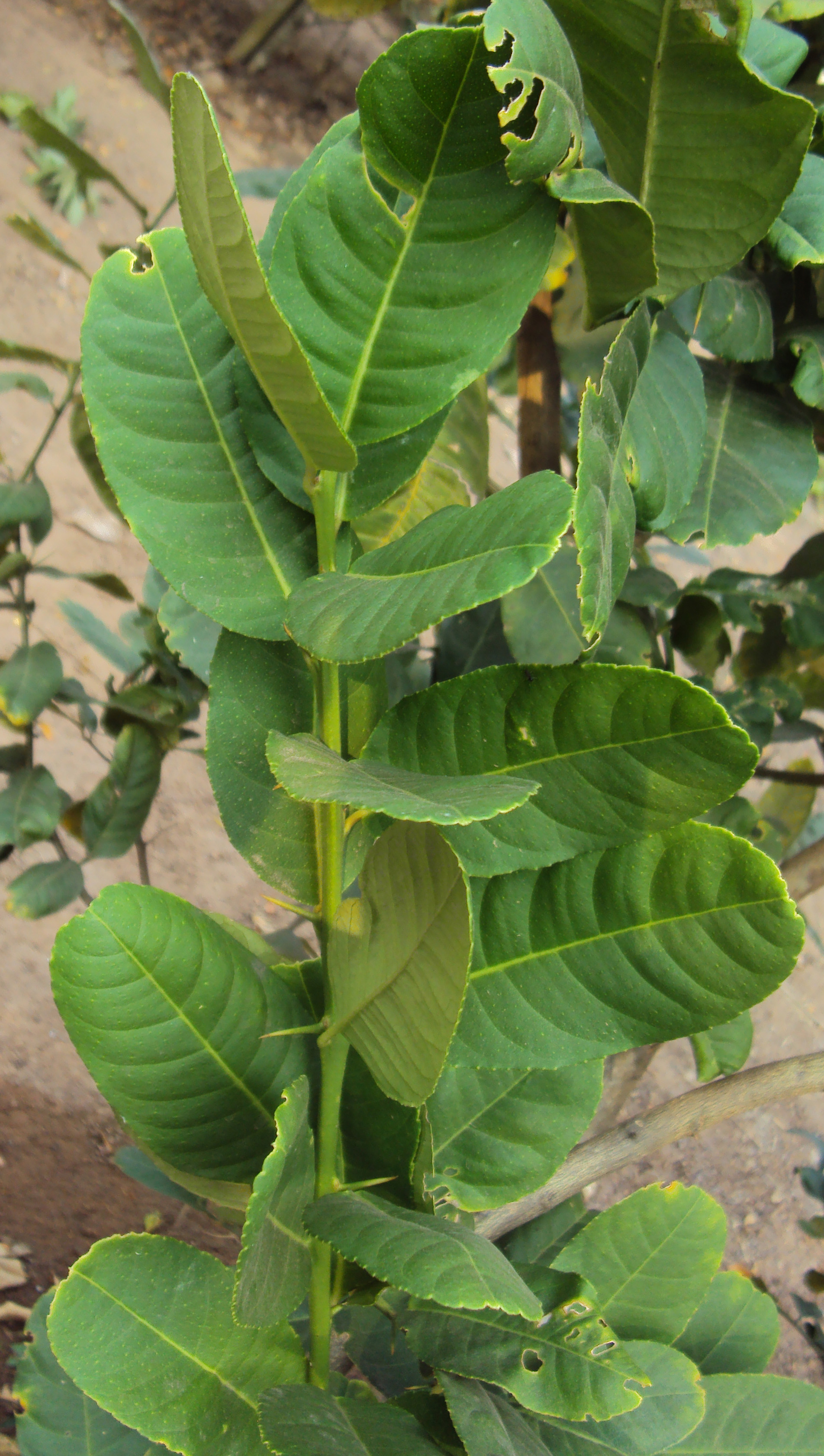
Etrog leaves

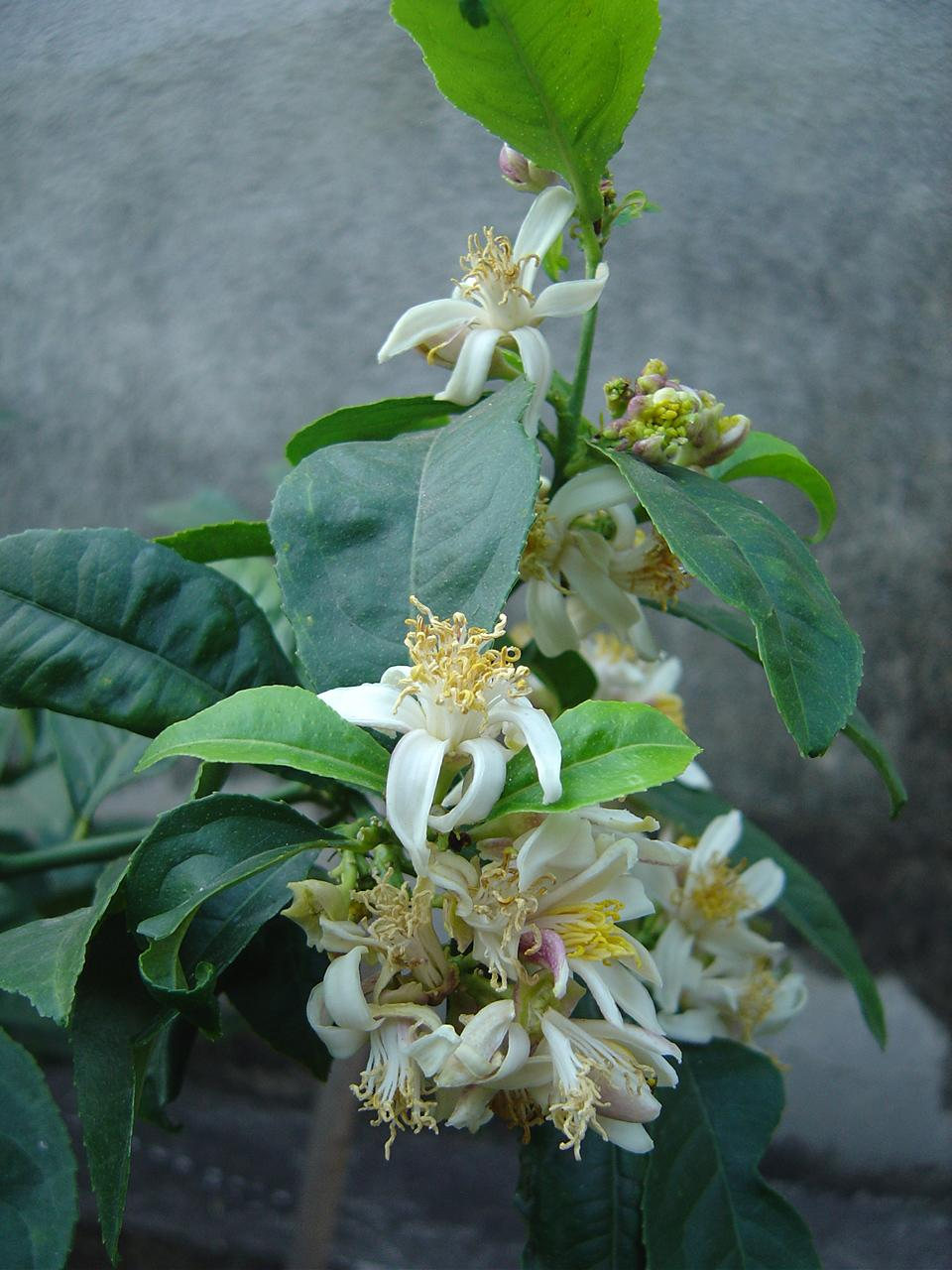
Citron (etrog) flowers

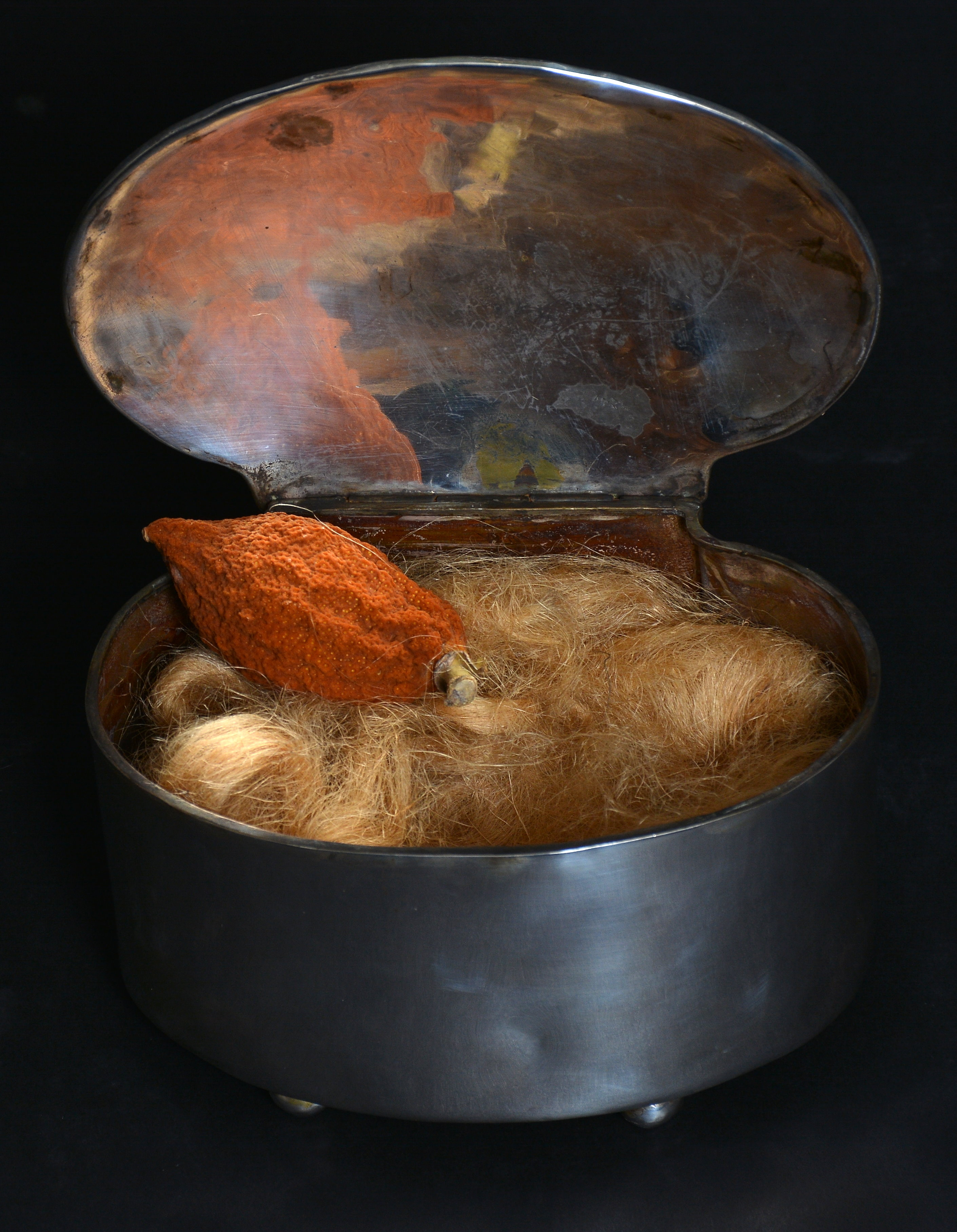
Silver etrog box designed by Rabbi Chaim-Joseph-Meyer Elefant (1897–1976) in the early 1950s

== See also ==
- Citrus taxonomy
- Etrog box
- Meir Auerbach
