= List of citron cultivars =

This is a list of all citron cultivars. Varieties are not included on this list. The formal cultivar name of citron cultivars will always be Citrus medica 'Cultivar Name' (for example: Citrus medica 'Corsican').

Common name	Description
'Bajoura'	Also known as the musk citron, this is a small, acidic, aromatic, lemon-shaped variety with yellow, rough skin. Possibly a hybrid between citron and lemon.
'Balady'	It resembles, and is used as an etrog.
'Brain'	Has a very thick, lumpy peel that makes it resemble a brain.
'Braverman'	Cone-shaped and has a rough peel.
'Cedruna'	Large and sour, but very susceptible to the cold.
'Chhangura'	Small and lacking any pulp, this cultivar can be found naturally and is believed to be the wild form of citron.
'Corsican'	This cultivar is the most popular citron on Corsica. It is large with a yellow, lumpy peel. The pulp is crisp and non-juicy as well as non-acidic, but very seedy.
Diamante	Small, yellow, lemon-shaped citron.
'Florentine'	Yellow, rough skin. Elongated shape with a long, pointed, tapering end.
'Greek'	Bumpy, yellow skin. Elongated shape with a tapering point at the end. Inner pulp is dry and sour.
'Italian'	A high-yielding cultivar with relatively large fruits, the juice and rind have a pleasant flavor.
'Kabbad'	Large variety with acidic flesh. Shape resembles a pear.
'Lumia'	Mostly smooth, yellow skin. Shape resembles a pear. Peel is thick and the pulp is mostly dry.
'Madhankri'	Known to have a sweet pulp, this is also a large fruit.
'Mexican'	A citron with a lemon shape, it has no acid or juice, and a rough, thick rind that tastes bitter. The flesh is slightly sweet, and it has many seeds.
'Moroccan'	A sweet, non-acidic cultivar.
'Odorata'	Its size and shape varies. The skin is almost smooth, and the rind is dense and sweet. The flesh is dry and moderately seedy, with very little flavor or acidity.
'Rhobs el Arsa'	Round and flat in shape. Skin smooth. Pulp is acidic and fruity. It is a hybrid between a citron and sour orange.
'Sicilian'	Its skin is partially smooth and partially bumpy and the rind has medium thickness. The flesh is highly juicy, but sour and tart along with being very seedy.
'Turunj'	A large cultivar with a dense peel, the pulp is dry and acidic, but the fruit is known to be sweet.
'Yemen'	Its size varies and the fruit has a sweet flavor. It contains no juice and the rind is very rough and thick.
'Yunnan'	Cultivated in China, it is seedless and has light yellow, sour flesh. It is very fragrant and juicy.
