= Moroccan citron =

Variety of fruit

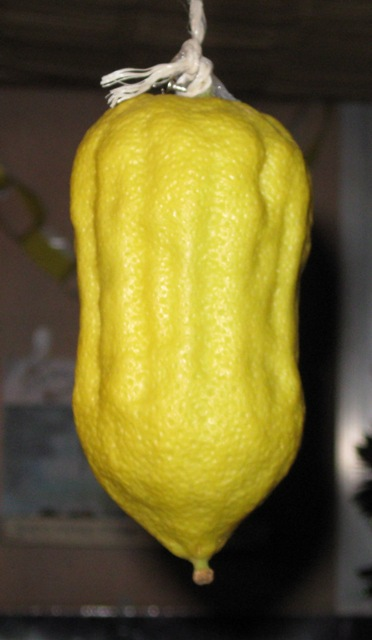
- Species: Citrus medica

The Moroccan citron (Hebrew: אֶתְרוֹג מָרוֹקָנִי) is a true citron variety native to Assads, Morocco, which is still today its main center of cultivation.

== Sweet citron ==
The Moroccan citron was described by the Moroccan professor Henri Chapot, as being a sweet citron, meaning that its pulp is low in acid. He discovered that the acidity in the more common citrons or lemons, is represented by red on the inner coat of seeds specifically on the chalazal spot, violet pigmentation on the outer side of the flower blossom, and also by the new buds that are reddish-purplish. The Moroccan citron which is acidless is completely lacking the red color. This designation was cited by Herbert John Webber and Leon Dexter Batchelor the editors of the fundamental treatise on citrus, namely The Citrus Industry, which was published by the University of California, Riverside in 1967.

Chapot was probably first to describe this variety of citron in detail, along with illustrations of many forms of the fruit, and all the properties of the shrub, leaves and blossoms. He also mentions that the true citron of Morocco, which is traditionally only grown in the region of Assads, for the sake of the mitzva of four species, and is oblong, acidless and rather dry, is much different than the rounded citron hybrid, Rhobs el Arsa, that is more commonly grown for food in the entire country of Morocco, and its taste is acidic and fruity.

The only other known sweet citron is the Corsican.

== Use as etrog ==
The exact date when the variety came into use for etrog is unknown. According to the local Jewry, it was with them since they were exiled to Morocco after the destruction of the Second Temple. From then on it was highly revered by all the rabbis and communities of North Africa, without any interruption or controversy. During time, it got accepted also by Ashkenazi communities all over Europe.

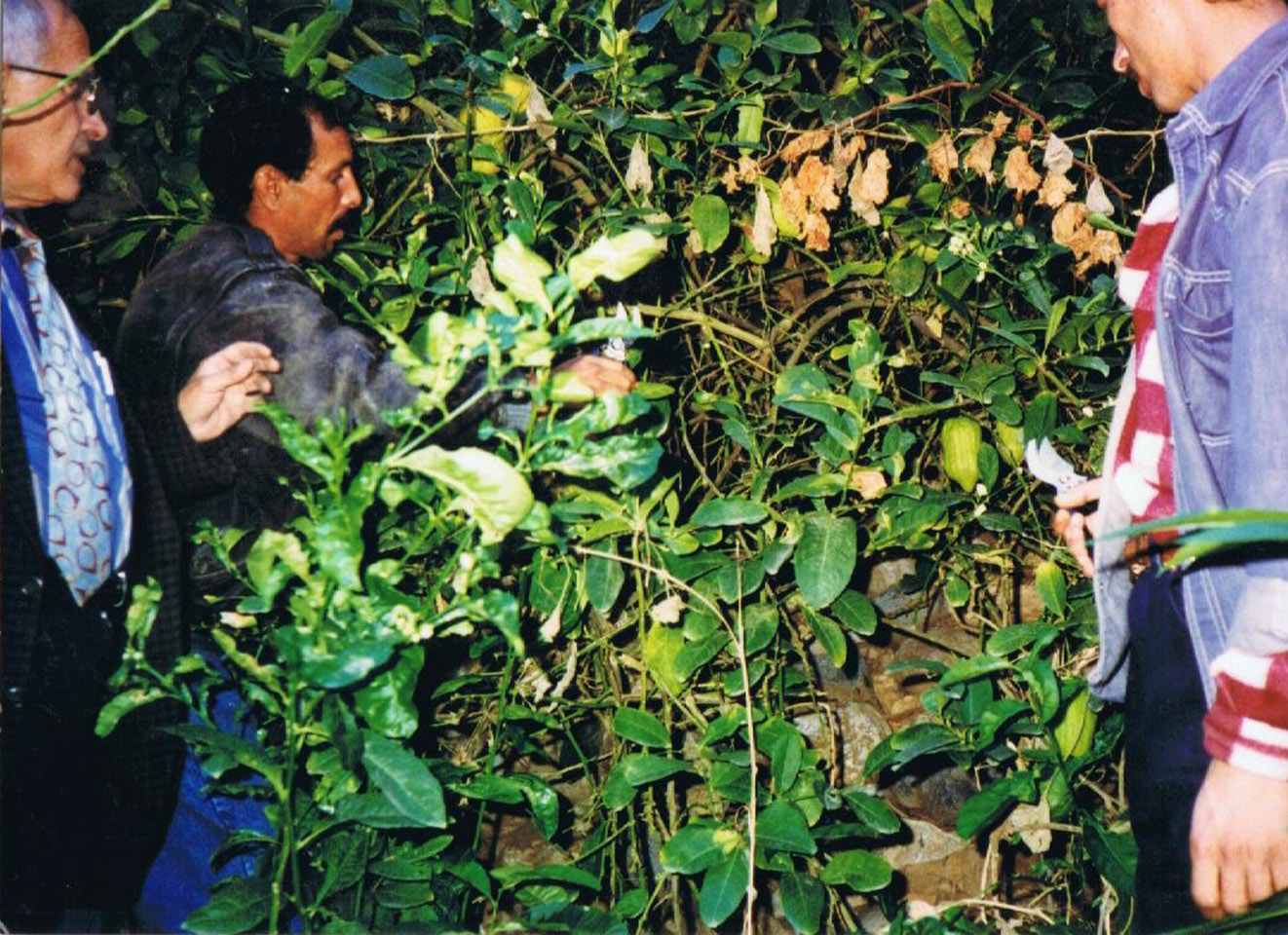
Berbers at their etrog plantations

=== Location of cultivation ===
The precise location of cultivation is at the village Assads in the Taroudant Province, and a 100 km east of Agadir, as was numerously reported by rabbinical and secular sources.

=== Graft free ===
Citrons grown by grafting onto another citrus species are not kosher for ritual use on the biblical Jewish holiday Sukkot, according to most interpretations of Jewish religious laws, (halakha). Some adherents prefer to search for etrog citrons none of whose ancestors had been grafted.

In 1995, professor Eliezer E. Goldschmidt together with a delegation of rabbis were hired by rabbi Yosef Shalom Eliashiv of Jerusalem, Israel, to check out if Morocco is still in the same state of kashrut, and if any grafted etrog is to be found over there. Goldschmidt asked the Moroccan professor of horticulture, namely Mohamed El-Otmani from Agadir, to assist.

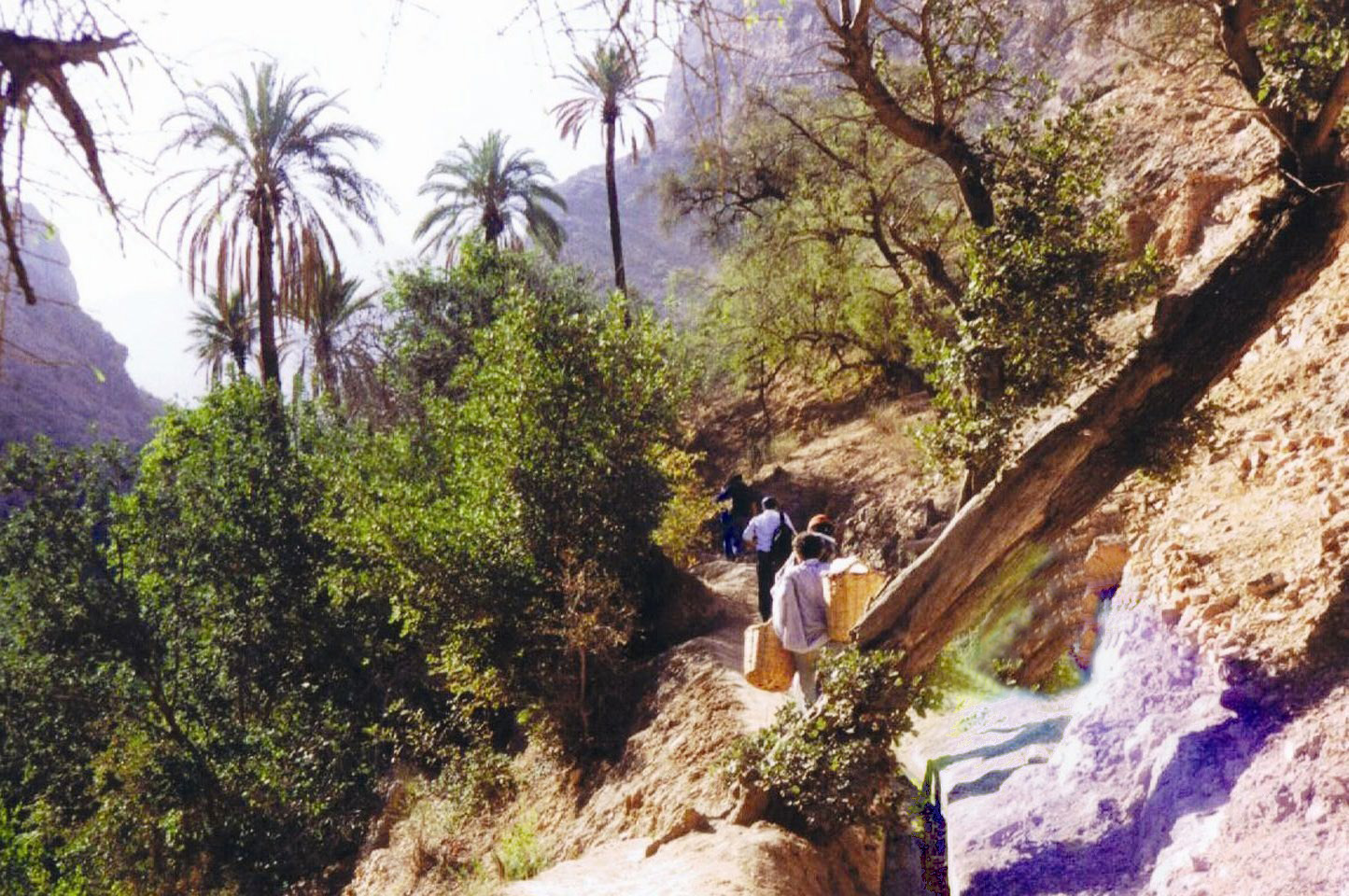
Berber peasants climbing up the steep mountain at the way to their orchards.

All together they climbed up the Anti-Atlas canyon, where the local Berbers have been cultivating the Moroccan citron for centuries, and they were impressed by the old tradition which is practiced there, finding not one grafted citron tree.

The delegation presented their findings to Eliashiv, who was very happy about the information that the Moroccan wilderness still presents the unbroken lineage, of a non-grafted etrog.

=== The lack of seeds ===
However, in 1960, Schraga Schlomai, a renowned etrog grower recounted the misfortunes of all the used etrog types besides the one he was growing, which he claimed to be a descendant of the Balady citron from Umm al-Fahm.

As to the Diamante citron (Yanova) and the Greek citron (Corfu), he argued based on the booklet from the Salant partners, that since some of them are proven to be grafted, no certification may be granted to the rest, since it is impossible to determine if the non-grafted citrons are not descendants of the grafted ones.

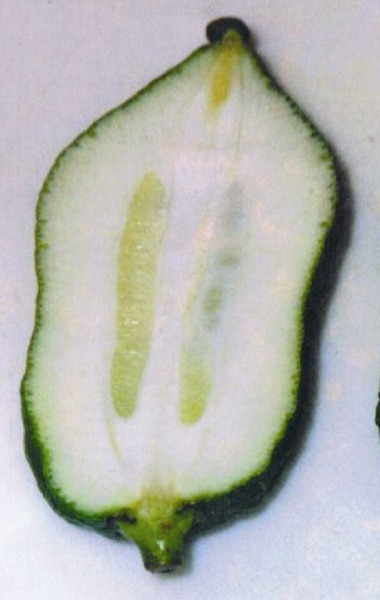
A halved seedless Moroccan citron (Etrog)

As to the Moroccan and Yemenite citrons he argued, that although there were no grafted trees ever discovered among those kinds, they should be unfit, in light of the differentiation from the Ashkenazi types. The Moroccan citron is allegedly noted for its seedlessness, and the Yemenite for its pulplessness, both are too much different in morphology from the traditional Yanova and Israeli etrogs.

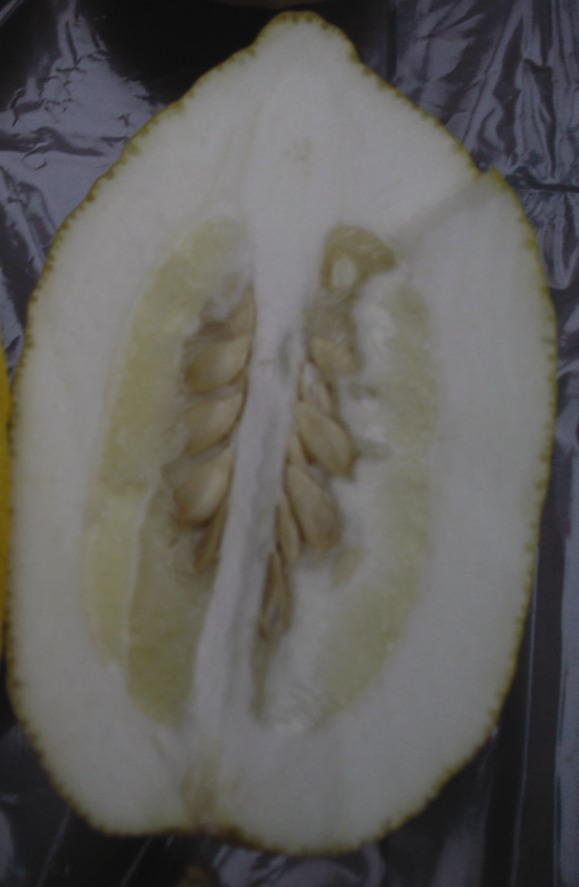
A Moroccan citron with vertically pointing seeds

In 1980, when the market in New York City changed very much in favor of the Moroccan citron, Rabbi Yekusiel Yehudah Halberstam, the Klausenberger Rebbe, reconsolidated the claims of Schraga Schlomai and carried out a banning of the Moroccan for religious use. His ruling was based on the fact that some of them have no seeds, and seeing that the Shiyurei Kneseth haGedola (Orach Chaim 648) discuses what direction the seeds should be facing to prove their purity, he concluded that an authentic citron should always be seedy.

The seeds of the Moroccan citron when present, are actually facing utmost vertically as required, and the partial seedlessness cannot be a result of graft, as the trees were already checked various times, as being completely free of any grafting.

=== Genetic purity ===
As to natural hybridization that may have occurred to certain types of citron, and should result in genetic and morphological changes, it is very unlikely in light of the DNA comparison conducted by Elizabetta Nicolosi from University of Catania, Italy and a group of researchers from around the globe, where it was found to be completely pure citron and extremely similar to the rest of kosher etrogs.

== See also ==
- Minhag Morocco
- Moroccan Jews
- Maghrebi Jews
- Berber Jews
- History of the Jews in Morocco
