= Diamante citron =

Variety of fruit

Diamante Citron
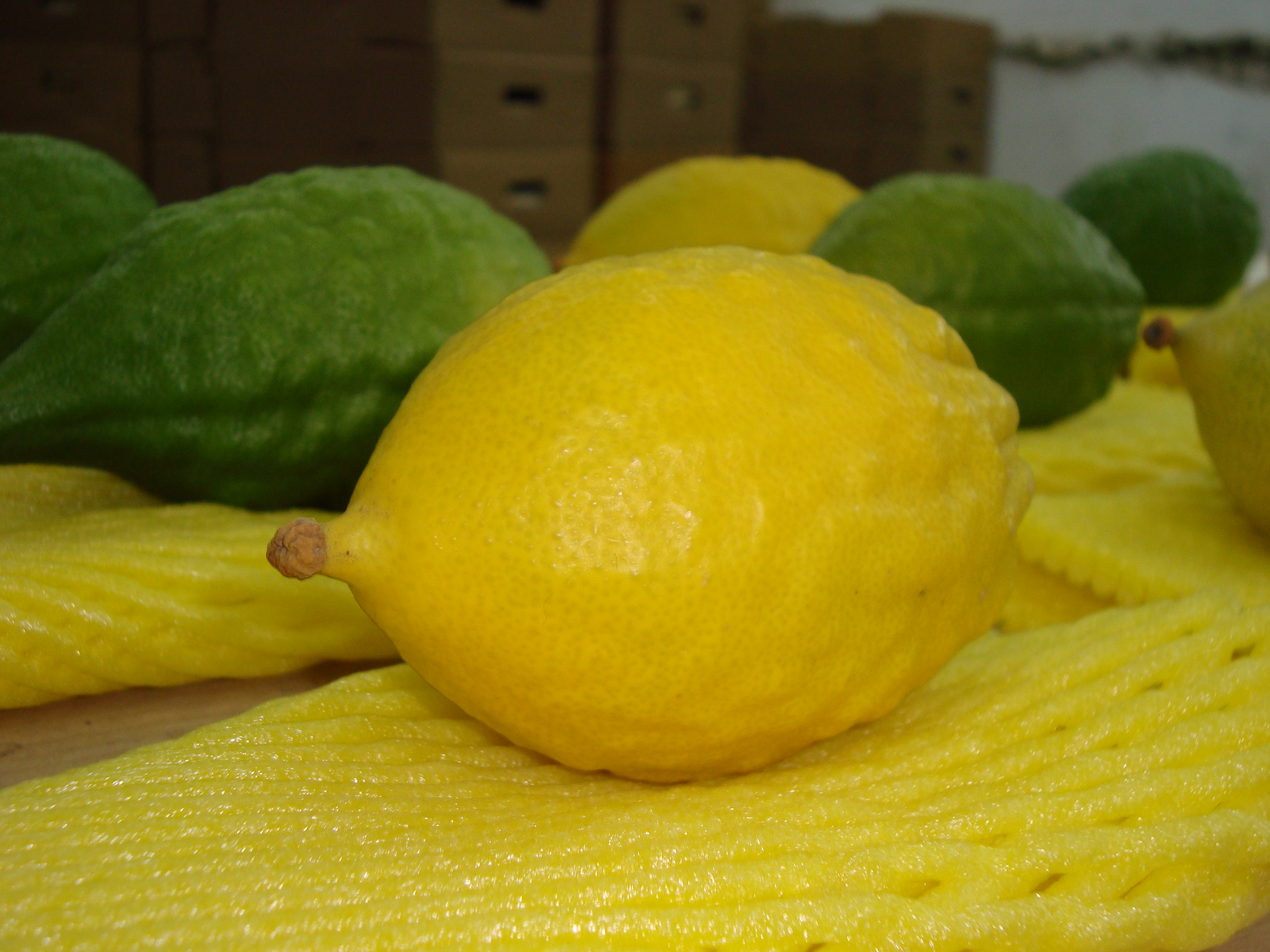
- Species: C. medica
- Cultivar: var. cedro di Calabria
- Marketing names: Yanover esrog

The Diamante citron (Citrus medica cv. diamante − cedro di diamante is a variety of citron named after the town of Diamante, located in the province of Cosenza, Calabria, on the south-western coast of Italy, which is its most known cultivation point. This is why this variety is sometimes called the "Calabria Esrog". "Esrog" is the Ashkenazi Hebrew name for citron.

diamante ('Cedro liscio'; possibly the same as 'Italian' and 'Sicilian')–of unknown origin but the leading cultivar in Italy and preferred by processors elsewhere; long-oval or ellipsoid, furrowed at base, broadly nippled at apex; peel yellow, smooth or faintly ribbed; very thick, fleshy; pulp crisp, non-juicy, acid; seedy. Tree small, spreading, thorny as 'Corsican'. Very similar is a cultivar called "Earle" in Cuba. – The Purdue University website

== History ==
The Diamante citron was one of the most important varieties candied by the largest factories at Livorno, Italy; it was gathered from Liguria, Naples, Calabria & Sicily and then shipped to England and the United States.

=== Association with Genoa ===
Many religious Jews call it Yanover Esrog (Genoa citron), because of a long association of the fruit with the trading port of Genoa in northern Italy, that exported it to other countries.

Genoa was known to supply citron for the Jews since the times of the Tosafists, along with surrounding municipalities Sanremo, Bordighera, and the rest of Liguria. The city is located in the region of Liguria, which itself has a long history of citron cultivation, thanks to the massive mountain chain (Apennines) which protects it from turbulent winds.

Genoa has also a known history of banking, and they may have also traded the citron grown in the rest of the country, including from Corsica and Calabria, being a well established seaport as well. Therefore, the Calabrian citron is also considered to be of oldest Ashkenazic tradition for the Jewish ritual during the Feast of Tabernacles.

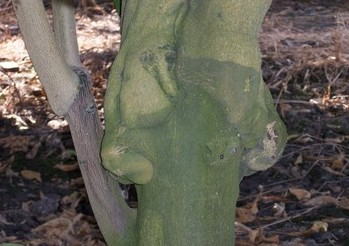
A double graft union, one at the stem and one at the branch.

Most adherent to the diamante variety of Calabria are Chabad Hasidim, whose late Rebbes were always in support of this traditional variety, even claiming by virtue of a legend that Moses himself obtained his esrog from this location. Among the other Hasidic sects, it is most used by the Satmars.

== Kashrus supervision ==
The citron in Calabria was celebrated by poets like Byron and D'Annunzio, but is only saved from extinction thanks to the Jewish tradition.

Because Calabria is at the southern point of Italy, and its climate most Mediterranean, it is the most suitable for the citron. Despite the milder climate, during the winter it is still too cold for the citron; this is why the farmers need to protect them with blue or green plastic covers. Most of the citron trees in the area are grafted onto foreign citrus rootstock, in order to save them from frost and disease. This practice renders their fruits non-kosher for the Sukkot ritual, and therefore in order for mashgichim to certify a citron as kosher, they must first carefully inspect the tree to confirm it was not grafted.

A Jewish delegation comes from Israel to Santa Maria del Cedro every year between July and August to choose the best fruit to be used in the holiday for the Jewish community. The selection of the best fruit is a virtual ritual. The mashgichim, each followed by a worker carrying a box and a pair of scissors, go to the citron farms at five in the morning. The mashgiach or machgicha proceeds slowly looking left and right. Then they stop and look at the base of the tree, right where the trunk comes up from the ground. A smooth trunk means the tree has not been grafted and the fruit can be picked. The mashgiach or mashgicha lies down on the ground to better examine the lower branches between the leaves.

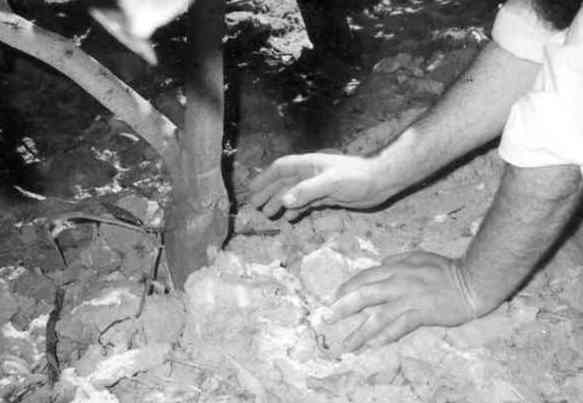
Each tree is inspected for signs of grafting.

Once a suitable fruit is found, the mashgiach or mashgicha shows it to the worker who cuts it off leaving a piece of the stalk. Then the mashgiach or mashgicha analyses the picked citron one more time and if they decide it is worthy they wrap it in oakum and puts it in the box. The farmer receives the agreed sum for each picked fruit. Then the boxes are sealed and sent to the Lamezia Terme International Airport, their final destination Tel Aviv.

Although diamante is also grown in Puerto Rico, Sicily and Sardinia, their citrons are not used for the Jewish ritual, since no kashrut certification was present at transplantation. Seeds and cuttings of inspected trees were planted in the Israeli village of Kfar Chabad, with the hechsher certification by major kashrut organizations.

The methods for tree checking to verify if the tree is grafted or not were established by a board of rabbis in Israel by 1877 as described in Kuntres Pri Etz Hadar which was published in Jerusalem a year after.

== Other citron varieties ==
- Citron of Calabria
- Different Citron varieties used as Etrog, are the Greek Citron, the Balady Citron, Moroccan Citron and Yemenite Citron
- Citron varieties, or hybrids not used for the ritual, are the Fingered Citron and Florentine Citron

== See also ==
- History of the Jews in Calabria
