= Fernandina =

Fernandina may refer to:

- Fernandina Beach, Florida
  - Original Town of Fernandina Historic Site
- Fernandina Island, Galapagos Islands
- Fernandina (fruit), a citrus fruit
