= Candied fruit =

Fruit preserved with sugar

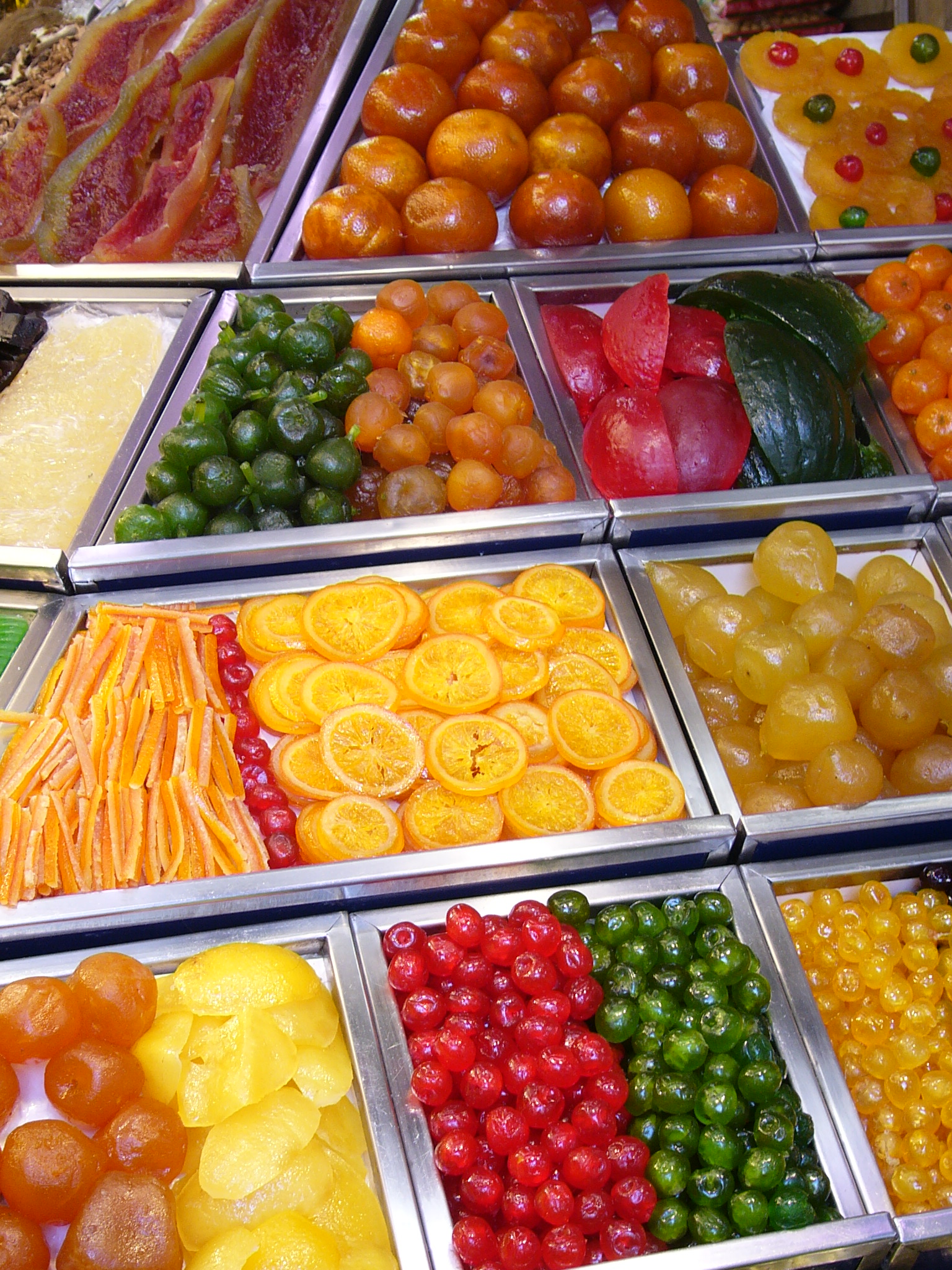
- Candied fruit displayed at La Boqueria in Barcelona
- Alternative names: glacé fruit
- Type: Confectionery
- Main ingredients: Fruit or peel, syrup

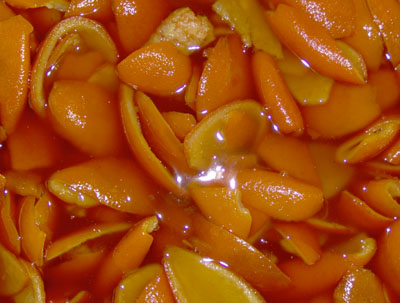
Candied orange peel

Candied fruit, also known as glacé fruit, is whole fruit, smaller pieces of fruit, or pieces of peel, placed in heated sugar syrup, which absorbs the moisture from within the fruit and eventually preserves it. Depending on the size and type of fruit, this process can take from several days to several months. This process of preservation, which has been used since the 14th century, allows the fruit to remain edible for up to a year.

Fruits which are commonly candied include cherries, pineapple, greengages, pears, peaches and melon, as well as ginger root. The principal candied peels are orange and citron; these, together with candied lemon peel, are the usual ingredients of mixed chopped peel. Vegetables such as pumpkin, turnip, carrot, and Angelica archangelica stems can also be candied.

Though recipes vary, the general principle is to boil, then steep fruit in increasingly stronger sugar solutions for a number of weeks, then dry off any remaining water. The continual process of drenching the fruit in syrup causes the fruit to become saturated with sugar, preventing the growth of spoilage microorganisms due to resulting osmotic pressure.

Candied fruits such as cherries and candied peels are eaten as snacks and used in fruitcakes or pancakes.

== See also ==
- Confit – Type of food preservation
- Maraschino cherry – Preserved, sweetened cherry
- Mostarda – Condiment from Italy made of candied fruit and mustard
- Succade – Candied citrus peel
- Tanghulu – Skewers of glazed fruit
- Sugar panning
- Sugar plum
