= Chenpi =

Traditional Chinese seasoning and medicine

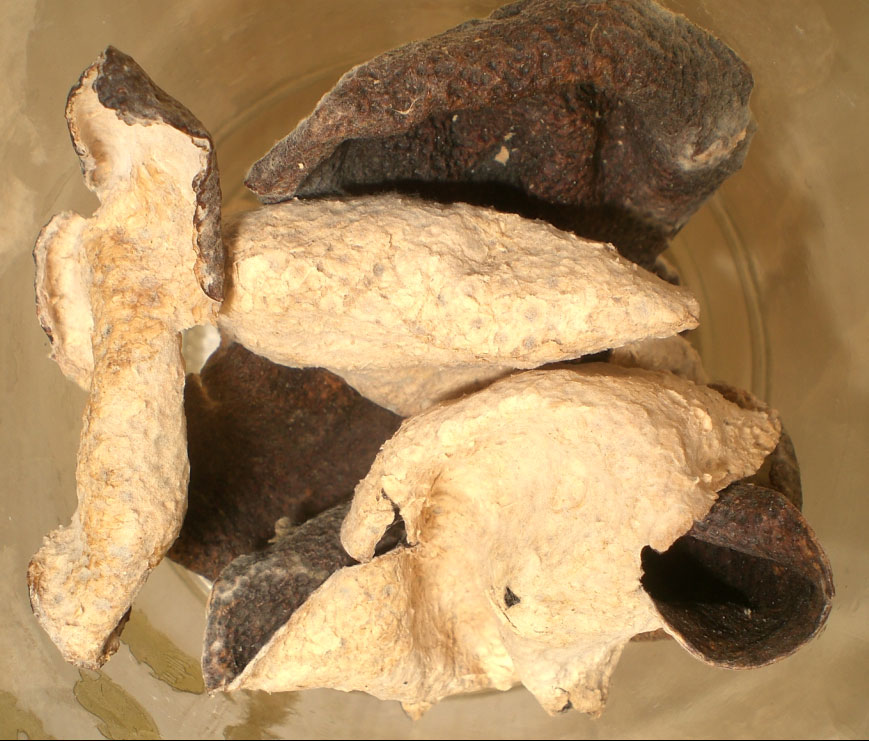
- Traditional Chinese: 陳皮
- Simplified Chinese: 陈皮
- Literal meaning: preserved peel
Transcriptions
Standard Mandarin
- Hanyu Pinyin: chénpí
- Bopomofo: ㄔㄣˊ ㄆㄧˊ
Hakka
- Romanization: cen² pi²
Yue: Cantonese
- Yale Romanization: chàhn pèih
- Jyutping: can⁴ pei⁴
Southern Min
- Hokkien POJ: tîn-phî

Gwo Pei
- Traditional Chinese: 果皮
- Literal meaning: fruit peel
Transcriptions
Yue: Cantonese
- Yale Romanization: gwó pèih
- Jyutping: gwo² pei⁴

Second alternative Chinese name
- Traditional Chinese: 橘皮
- Simplified Chinese: 桔皮
- Literal meaning: orange peel
Transcriptions
Standard Mandarin
- Hanyu Pinyin: júpí
Yue: Cantonese
- Yale Romanization: gwāt pèih
- Jyutping: gwat¹ pei⁴

Chenpi, chen pi, or chimpi is sun-dried mandarin orange peel used as a traditional seasoning in Chinese cooking and traditional medicine. It is aged by storing the peels dry. The taste is first slightly sweet, but the aftertaste is pungent and bitter. According to Chinese herbology, its attribute is warm. Chenpi has a common name, 'ju pi' or mandarin orange peel.

Chenpi contains volatile oils which include the chemical compounds nobiletin, hesperidin, neohesperidin, tangeretin, citromitin, synephrine, carotene, cryptoxanthin, inositol, vitamin B_{1}, and vitamin C. Traditional Chinese herbal medicine uses the alcohol extracts of several citrus peels, including those extracted from mandarin orange and bitter orange.

== Identification ==
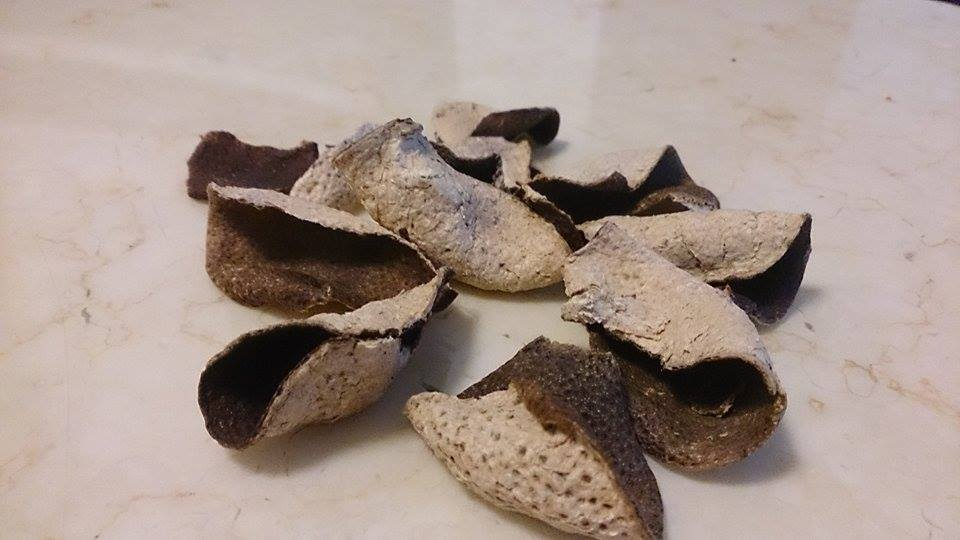
Sun-dried tangerine peels (chenpi)

Since the products produced in Xinhui are purported to be the best quality, it is often called Xinhui Pi (新會皮) or Guang Chen Pi (廣陳皮). It is normally cut into shreds before serving and presenting in the raw form.

== History ==
The practice of using citrus peels in traditional Chinese medicine originated in the Song dynasty and has lasted for seven hundred years. Chenpi was of high popularity through the Ming and Qing dynasties. It was shipped to foreign provinces by businessmen from Xinhui in Guangdong. A famous Qing doctor named Ye Gui (1667–1746) prescribed chenpi as one of the ingredients in 'Erchen Tang', a decoction consisting of two old drugs. Chenpi business brought wealth to Xinhui peasants and it also extended to food processing logistics areas which form part of the food production chain. However, chenpi business declined in the 1990s until late 2002 when chenpi farmers helped set up the Chenpi Industrial Association with support from Xinhui Agriculture Bureau and Business Federation, and chenpi has regained its popularity since.

== Production method ==
Xinhui chenpi is famous for its special production technique, where emphasis is put on peeling and storage methods. People can also do it at home.

== Preparation ==
Prior to consumption, chenpi is soaked and rinsed with cold water until it becomes soft; the recommended soaking time is no longer than half an hour with a view to retaining its flavor. Afterwards, the white pith is gently scraped off from the softened peel.

== Uses ==
=== Cuisine ===
Some tong sui desserts such as red bean soup use this ingredient. Chenpi is used to make the dish orange chicken. It can also be used for other kinds of food and beverages such as porridge, duck, pigeon, mooncakes, green bean soup, jam, and wine. Chenpi-infused tea can also be prepared.

In Japanese cuisine, chenpi (pronounced ちんぴ "chimpi" in Japanese) is a common ingredient in shichimi tōgarashi, a traditional spice mix.

=== Folk medicine ===
Chenpi is a common ingredient in Chinese folk medicine, where it is believed that it regulates qi, fortifies the spleen, eliminates dampness, improves abdominal distension, enhances digestion, and reduces phlegm. There is a well-known chenpi-derived medicine named 'snake gallbladder and tangerine peel powder'. The powder is used for heart disharmonies.

== Availability ==
Whole citrus peel is readily available from most herbal markets and specialty food stores. Some stores also sell citrus peel powder or capsules.

Starting from around 2010, extensive land development for commercial and residential use in China has caused the decrease of farmland, especially in Xinhui, affecting the supply of Xinhui citrus and consequently chenpi production. This in turn has contributed to a steep increase in the price of chenpi. Based on data in late 2014, Xinhui chenpi aged one year costs around 140 HKD per kilogram while those aged 10 years cost 600 to 800 HKD per kilo. Chenpi stored for more than 20 years can reach nearly 24,000 RMB per kilogram. 65-year chenpi even costs 23,000 RMB per tael. Wholesale price of chenpi costs 40 to 70 HKD per pound.

== See also ==
- Shichimi, a seasoning mix containing dried mandarin peel
- Jujube
- List of dried foods
- Prune
- Succade
- Zest (ingredient)
