= Assads, Morocco =

Assads
- Rural commune and town
- Location within Morocco
- Coordinates: 30°14′0″N 8°52′0″W
- Country: Morocco
- Region: Souss-Massa-Drâa
- Province: Taroudant Province

Population (2004)
  - Total: 5,512
- Time zone: UTC+0 (GMT)

Assads is a small town and rural commune in Taroudant Province of the Souss-Massa-Drâa region of Morocco. At the time of the 2004 census, the commune had a total population of 5512 people living in 939 households.

Assads is the home place for the Moroccan citron.
