= Succade =

Candied citrus peel

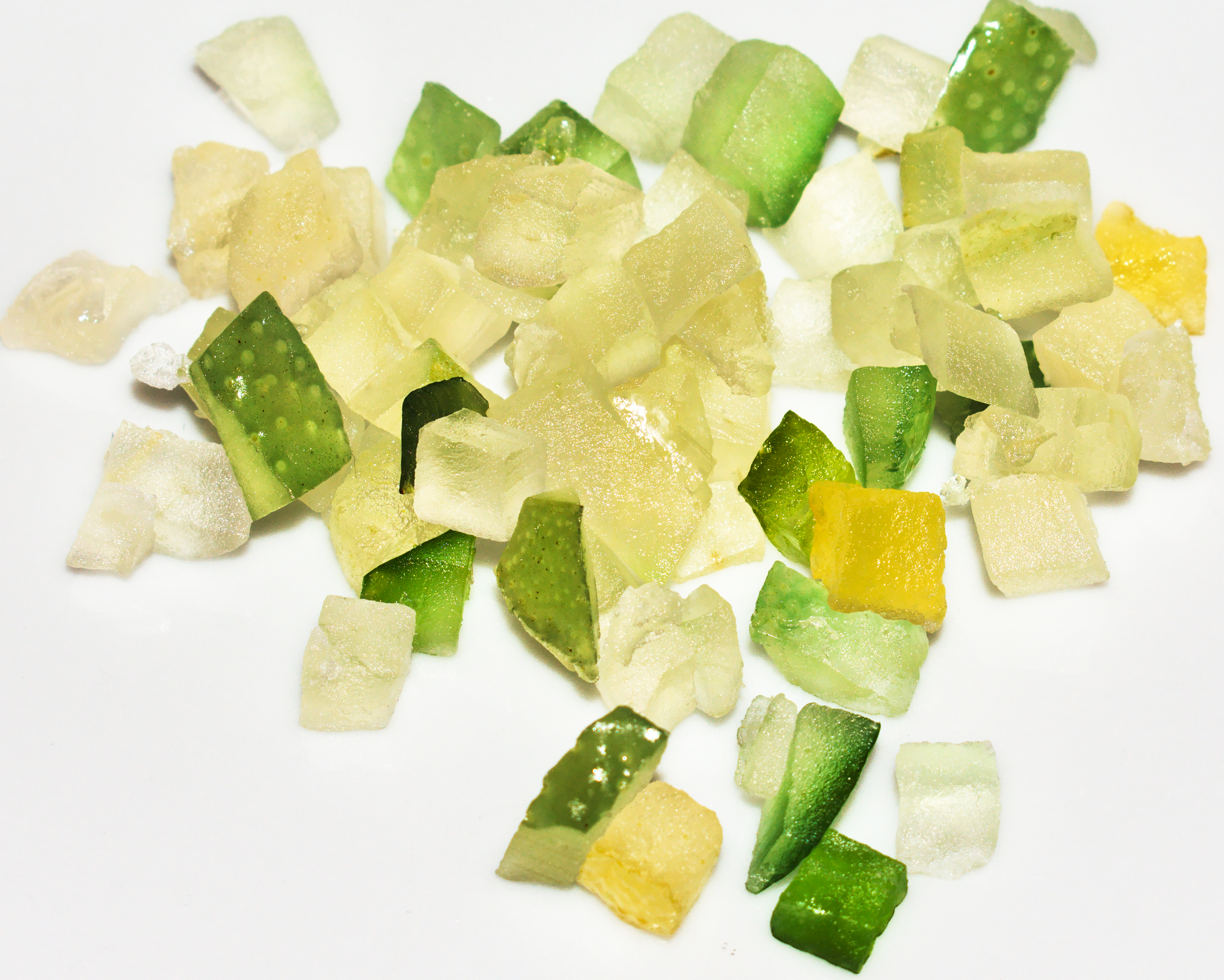
- Diced succade
- Type: Confectionery
- Main ingredients: Candied peel of citrus

Succade is the candied peel of any of the citrus species, especially from the citron or Citrus medica which is distinct with its extra-thick peel; in addition, the taste of the inner rind of the citron is less bitter than those of the other citrus. However, the term is also occasionally applied to the peel, root, or even entire fruit or vegetable like parsley, fennel and cucurbita which have a bitter taste and are boiled with sugar to get a special "sweet and sour" outcome.

Fruits which are commonly candied also include dates, cherries, pineapple, ginger, and the rind of watermelon.

== Name ==
The word succade is most probably derived from the Latin succidus, but according to others the name may have originated from the Hebrew word sukkah, the temporary booth that Jews build on the holiday of Sukkot. The citron, known in Hebrew as an etrog, is one of the symbolic Four Species used on that holiday. After Sukkot, some Jews candy the etrog or make marmalade from it.

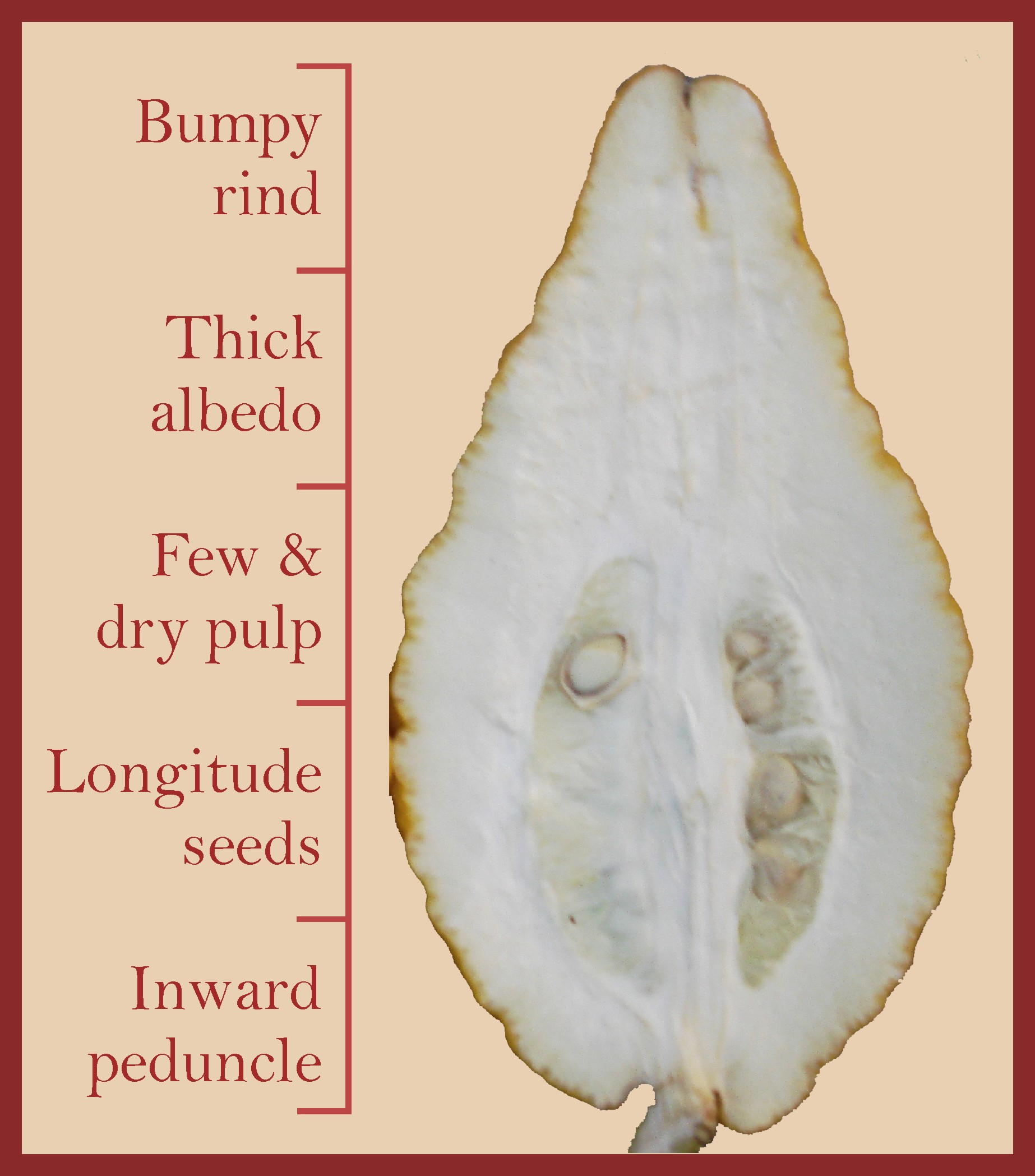
A pure citron of any kind has a large portion of albedo, which is important for the production of succade

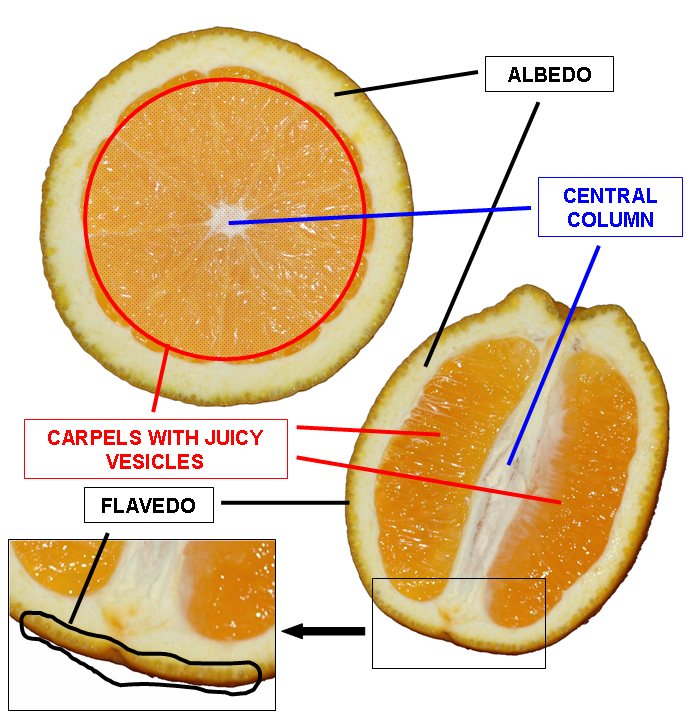
Location of mesocarp or albedo in a sweet orange

While the word Succade was widely used in German, today it is usually called Zitronat. The French call it fruit glacé or fruit confit, and is also known as candied fruit or crystallized fruit. It has been around since the 14th century.

== Production ==
The citron fruits are halved, depulped, immersed in seawater or ordinary salt water to ferment for about 40 days, the brine being changed every two weeks, rinsed, and put in denser brine in wooden barrels for storage and for export. After partial de-salting and boiling to soften the peel, it is candied in a strong sugar solution. The candied peel is sun-dried or put up in jars for future use. Candying is traditionally done in Livorno, Italy, where they gathered the Corsican citrons from Corsica, the Diamante citrons from Liguria, Naples, Calabria and Sicily, and the Greek citron from Greece through Trieste.

The continual process of drenching the fruit in syrup causes the fruit to become saturated with sugar, thereby preventing the growth of spoilage microorganisms.

In the Eastern Bloc, ersatz succade and orangeat were prepared from unripe tomatoes and carrots respectively, as citrus fruits were scarce goods that could not be produced domestically.

== Uses ==
Succade is sometimes used in cakes, as a filling for pound cake, oliebol, plum pudding, florentines, sfogliatelle, fruitcake or ontbijtkoek. It is also added to raisin bread. Succade is often combined with currants, raisins, cherries and hazelnuts. Candied citron peel is often coated in chocolate and eaten as confectionery. Chopped succade is also used in cannoli.

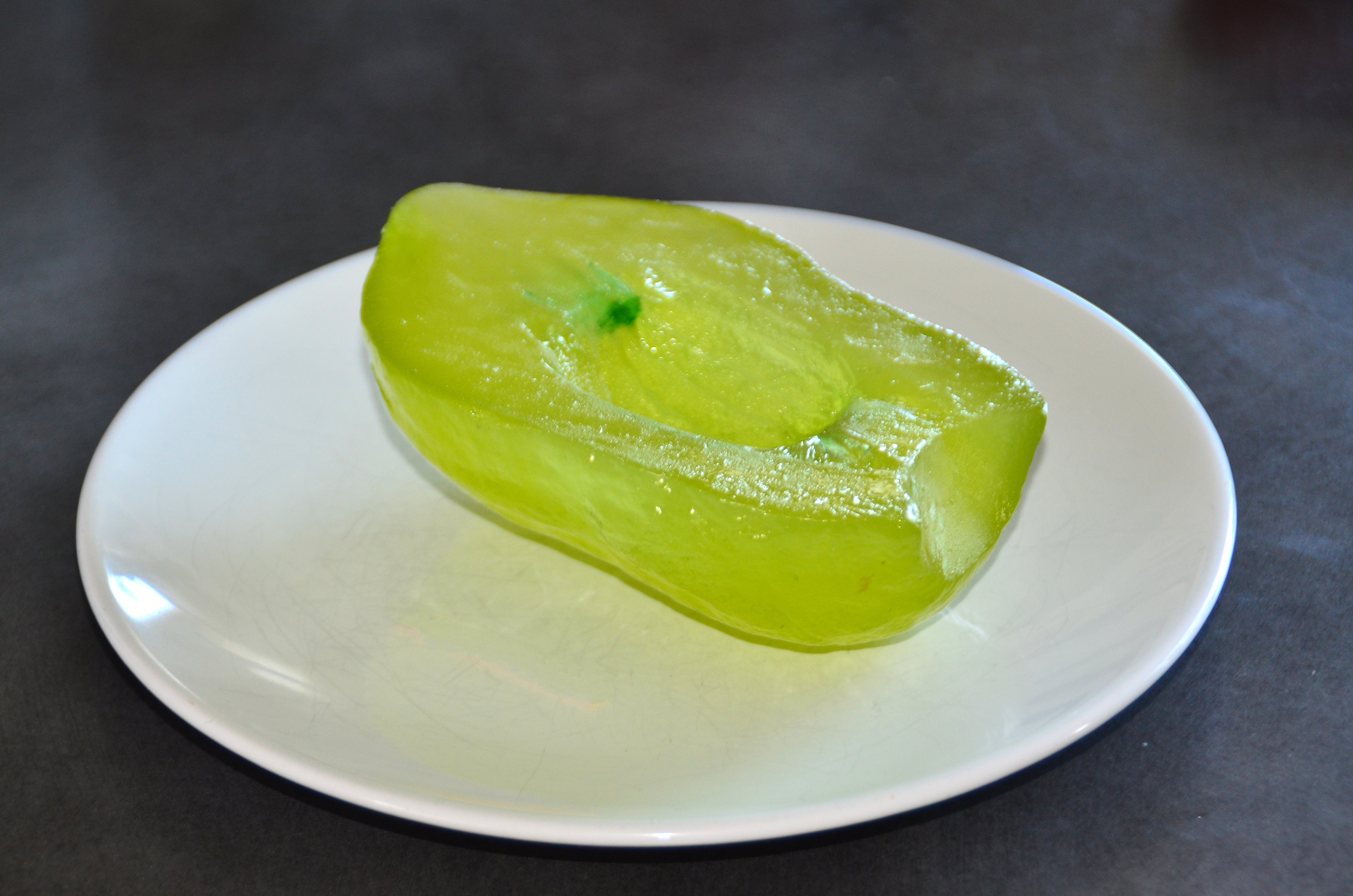
A citron halved and depulped, cooked in sugar.

=== Recipes ===
Recipes vary from region to region, but the general principle is to boil the fruit, steep it in increasingly strong sugar solutions for a number of weeks, and then dry off any remaining water.

The high sugar content of finished glacé fruits inhibits the growth of microorganisms, and glacé fruits will keep for a number of years without any additional methods of preservation.

Fruits that hold up well to being preserved in this manner include cherries, plums, peaches, apricots, pears, starfruit, pineapple, apples, oranges, lemons, limes and clementines. Angelica is rarely seen in Western cooking except as a glacé fruit.

== See also ==
- Candied fruit – Fruit preserved with sugar
- Chenpi – Traditional Chinese seasoning and medicine
- Fruit anatomy – Internal makeup of fruits
- Mincemeat – Mixture of dried fruit, spices and fat
- Sukade – Species of citrus plant
