= Minhag Morocco =

Minhag Morocco (Hebrew:מנהג מרוקו) refers to the religious customs adopted by Moroccan Jewry, from the Hebrew "minhag", or custom. Although in the Middle Ages, there was a unique Nusach Morocco, unrelated to Sephardic liturgy, this original minhag has not been practiced since shortly after the Expulsion of Jews from Spain, and it is not well documented. Since this time, the Moroccan rite has been a subset of the Sephardic rite, but with certain customs of its own. Many sources contributed to and influenced the development of Moroccan religious customs, including the Shulchan Aruch, the Livorno minhag, the Ashkenazic minhag and even the presence of the Chabad-Lubavitch movement in Morocco after the arrival of Americans in Operation Torch. Minhag Morocco can be considered a sub-class within the Sephardic minhag but has many differences and unique traits. A related concept that falls under Minhag Morocco is the Moroccan Nusach, which more specifically refers to the variations in the prayer service.

Minhag Morocco itself is not monolithic. Even within the Moroccan Minhag there are variations, most notably those between the Spanish-Moroccan community and the French-Moroccan community. Furthermore, there are variations from city to city (Fes versus Meknes, for example). The Spanish community historically resided in the northern tip of Morocco in such cities as Tangiers and Tetouan while the French community resided in the larger southern zone which included Casablanca, Marrakesh, Fes, Meknes, among others.

The Moroccan Minhag is extant today in the small Jewish community that remains in Morocco as well as in many "diaspora" communities outside of Morocco. As Moroccan Jews emigrated to Israel, France, Canada, the United States, Venezuela, etc., they transplanted the customs of their community to wherever they settled and in most cases were able to establish synagogues that suited their ritual preferences. Indeed, in casual religious parlance, a synagogue that has adopted the Moroccan Minhag as its official rite is known as a "Moroccan" synagogue.

== History ==
Before the settlement in North Africa of Sephardic Jews expelled from Spain, there was a distinct North African nusach unrelated to Sephardic liturgy. These customs are not well documented.

The Sephardic immigrant megorashim (מגורשים 'exiles' or, in Arabic, rūmiyīn روميين 'Romans,' i.e. 'Europeans') and the toshavim (תושבים 'residents' or, in Arabic, bildiyīn بلديين 'natives'), the autochthonous Amazigh and Arabized North African Jewish communities, had some differences in religious practices. There were differences with regard to shehita, or ritual kosher slaughter, and to ketuba, or the marriage contract, obstructing their ability to eat together and marry, and therefore to assimilate.

In the 16th century, a group of rabbis known as the "Sages from Castille" (Ladino: Hajamei Castilla) gained dominance in the interpretation of rabbinical law for the Jewish community in Fes, and the Sephardic minhag became dominant in religious practice.

== Nusach Morocco ==
In general, the Moroccan rite follows the template of the more general Sephardic rite. As such, a person normally accustomed to another Sephardic Nusach and is praying among Moroccans or using a Moroccan siddur will not encounter many differences for the most part. The observer of a typical Moroccan Jewish prayer service will note the presence of Oriental motifs in the melodies. However, unlike the tunes of Eastern rites (Syrian, Iraqi, etc.), which were influenced by Middle Eastern sounds, Moroccan Jewish religious tunes have a uniquely Andalusian feel. Furthermore, just as Eastern liturgical melodies are organized into maqāms, Moroccan liturgy can be classified by nūbas. The Moroccan prayer rite itself is also unique among Sephardic customs. The Moroccan nusach has many unique components but has also incorporated numerous Ashkenazic customs due to the country's proximity and exposure to Europe

=== Kabbalat Shabbat ===
After Minha prayers on Friday the prevalent custom is to read the Song of Songs, which is known in Hebrew as Shir Hashirim. In other Sephardic customs, this is read prior to Minha. As is common in other parts of the prayer service, Shir Hashirim is usually divided up among the congregants with one congregant reciting one of the eight chapters in the Song. Shir Hashirim has its own unique cantillation. The Song is prefaced by a Leshem Yehud prayer whose purpose is to unify the name of the Almighty and to instill the proper spiritual intent among the readers. Prior to the first chapter, verse 2:12 is sung. The last few verses (some communities start at 8:8, others at 8:11) are then sung in unison, and finally a concluding prayer is said.

Unlike other communities, many Moroccan communities sit during Lecha Dodi. As well this song is sometimes sung by the entire congregation in unison and at other times one congregant sings each of the nine stanzas. After the last stanza the prevalent custom is to recite 4 verses from the Shir Hashirim (1:2, 4:16, 2:8 and 5:1), which were arranged as an alternative for someone who was not able to recite the whole song in its entirety.

=== Motzei Shabbat ===
Prior to the Arvit prayers following Shabbat, several Psalms are recited. Most prayerbooks include the "Alpha Beta" (Psalm 119), followed by the 15 Songs of Ascents (Shir Hamaalot in Hebrew). A more common custom is for the congregation to recite Psalm 15, Psalm 16, Psalm 144 and then Psalm 67. It is not unusual for some communities to omit Psalms 15 and 16 and to begin with Psalm 144 with its characteristic tune. In many communities that include the first two, Psalm 16 (Michtam LeDavid) is given with a unique tune and with one congregant individually singing each verse. The Internet abounds with recordings of Psalm 16 sung in the Moroccan tune.

Unique among Sephardic customs, the Moroccan nusach includes the recitation of the blessing commencing with the words Yiru Enenu (Heb. יראו עינינו, translation: Our eyes shall see) immediately preceding the Amida of Motzei Shabbat and holidays. Many Ashkenazim say this passage every weekday night after Hashkivenu. This custom is discussed in Tosafot of Tractate Berakhot 4a.

=== Hallel ===
The recitation of Hallel in the Moroccan minhag is unique in that two possible blessings may be recited. In most contemporary Sephardic customs, a blessing is recited only on full Hallel; the blessing in this case is "Ligmor et haHallel" (Heb. לגמור את ההלל, lit. "To complete the Hallel"). When the abridged Hallel is recited, such as on Rosh Hodesh, no blessing is said at all. Among Ashkenazim, the prevailing custom is to use the blessing "Likro et haHallel" (Heb. לקרוא את ההלל, lit. "To read the Hallel") whether the full or abridged Hallel is read. In the Moroccan nusach, the "Ligmor et haHallel" blessing is said when the full Hallel is recited, and the "Likro et haHallel" blessing is read with the abridged Hallel.

== Other customs ==
=== Havdalah ===
A unique feature in the Moroccan Minhag is the recitation of the introductory song Avarech et Shem (lit. "I shall bless [the Almighty's name]). During Havdalah all sorts of fragrant herbs and spices are used in the Moroccan community, including fresh spearmint leaves, rose water, cloves and myrtle branches. Some include the recitation of the Priestly Blessing as well as the Torah portion dealing with Pinhas ben Elazar (Numbers 25:10-25:12) as both of these portions have the theme of peace.

=== Sefer Torah ===
One distinguishing feature between Ashkenazic and Sephardic synagogues are the types of decorative coverings used for the Torah scroll. Moroccan synagogues are known to use the Ashkenazic-type covering instead of the hard case used by other Sephardim.

== See also ==
- Mimouna
- Moroccan citron
