= Peel (fruit) =

Outer layer of fruit or vegetable

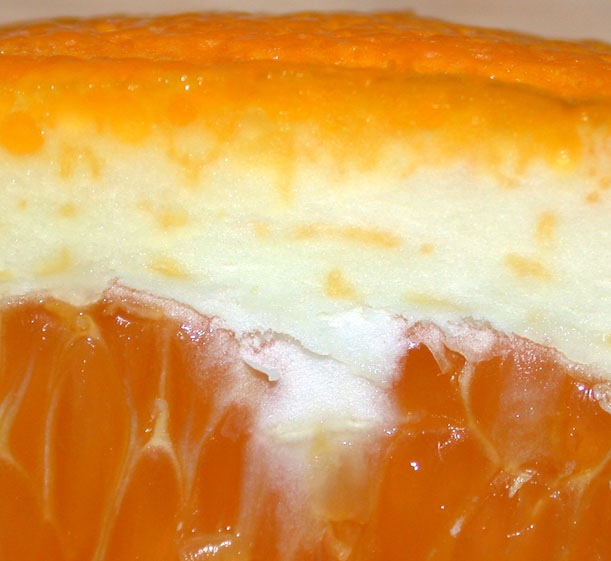
Orange flavedo and albedo

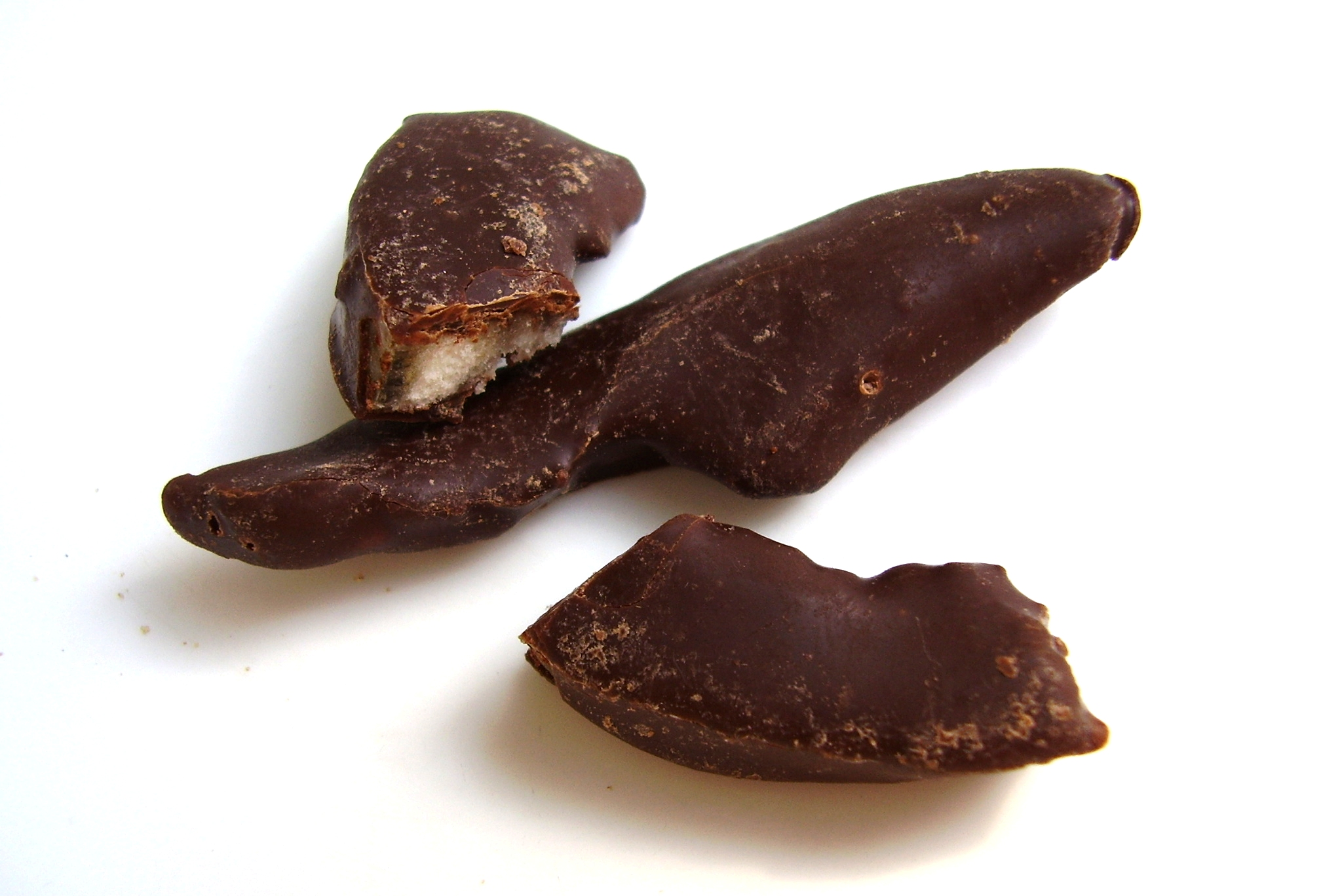
Chocolate-coated citrus peel.

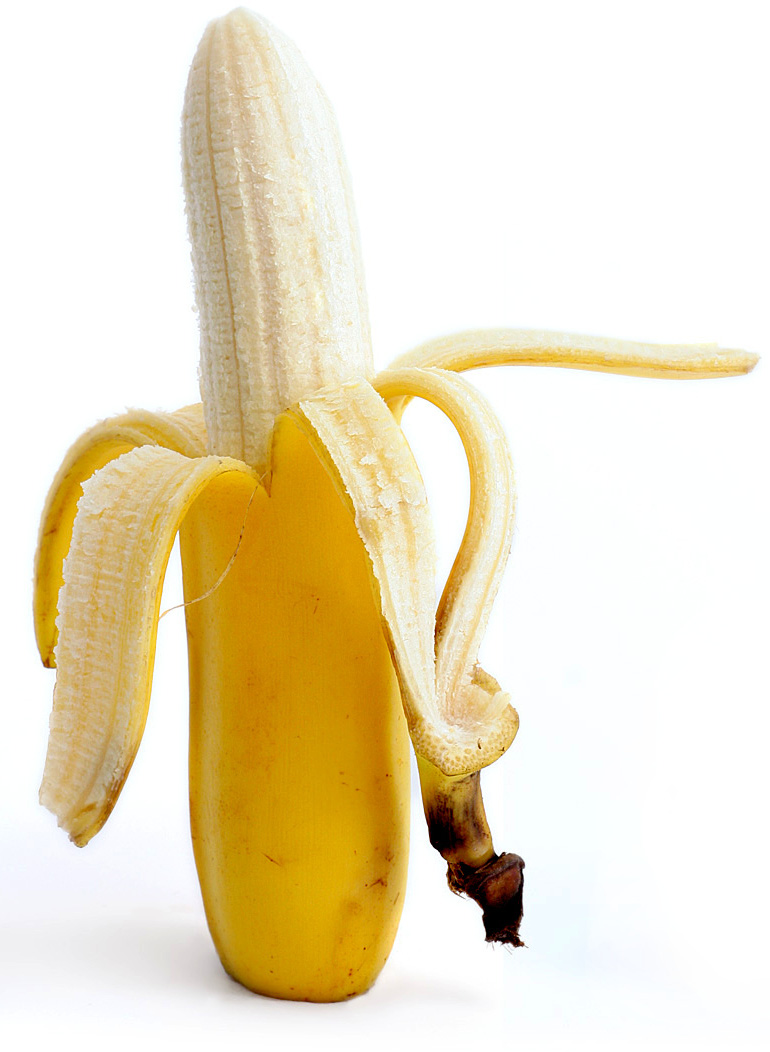
A partially peeled banana

Peel, also known as rind or skin, is the outer protective layer of a fruit or vegetable which can be peeled off. The rind is usually the botanical exocarp, but the term exocarp also includes the hard cases of nuts, which are not named peels since they are not peeled off by hand or peeler, but rather shells because of their hardness.

A fruit with a thick peel, such as a citrus fruit, is called a hesperidium. In hesperidia, the inner layer (also called albedo or, among non-botanists, pith) is peeled off together with the outer layer (called flavedo), and together they are called the peel. The flavedo and albedo, respectively, are the exocarp and the mesocarp. The juicy layer inside the peel (containing the seeds) is the endocarp.

== Uses ==
Depending on the thickness and taste, fruit peel is sometimes eaten as part of the fruit, such as with apples. In some cases the peel is unpleasant or inedible, in which case it is removed and discarded, such as with bananas or grapefruits.

The peel of some fruits—for example, pomegranates—is high in tannins and other polyphenols, and is employed in the production of dyes.

The peel of citrus fruits is bitter and generally not eaten raw, but may be used in cooking. In gastronomy, the outermost colored part of the peel is called the zest, which can be scraped off and used for its tangy flavor. A large piece of citrus peel, called a "twist", is often used to garnish cocktails. The fleshy white part of the peel, bitter when raw in most species, is used as succade or is prepared with sugar to make marmalade or fruit soup. The peel can also be candied, or dried to produce a seasoning (e.g., chenpi).

=== Nutrition ===
Raw orange peel is 73% water, 25% carbohydrates, 2% protein, and contains negligible fat. In a reference amount of 100 g (3.5 oz), raw orange peel supplies 97 calories and 11 grams of dietary fiber, with vitamin C in rich content (136 mg).

== See also ==
- Banana peel
- Biorefinery: conversion of citrus peel to succinic acid
- Fruit anatomy, describing the botanical terms of fruit and skin layers
- Peeler
- Zest (ingredient)
