= Kabbad =

Citrus fruit and plant

The Kabbad refers to a citron-like fruit or citrus hybrid which was first described in 1963 by the Moroccan professor Henri Chapot, in his article named "Le Cédrat Kabbad et deux autres variétés de cédrat", who remarked it to be a biological hybrid between the citron and the orange sourcing from Damascus, Syria.

Following is from The Citrus Industry vol. 1 Chap.4:

Fruits Resembling the Citron. — There are numerous fruits in which citron characters are strongly pronounced. The lumias of the Mediterranean basin are natural hybrids in which acid citron or lemon and pummelo characters are evident. According to Chapot (1950a), they are characterized by fruits of large size, commonly somewhat pyriform, with highly acid flesh of greenish color, large purple-tinged flowers, and young shoot growth both pubescent and purple-tinted. Chapot states that the principal clonal varieties are "Poire du Commandeur", "Citron de Borneo" (Chapot, 1964d), and "Pomme d'Adam". They are of ancient and unknown origin, presumably Italian, and are grown only as curiosities or ornamentals. The giant-fruited "Sui Khar" citron of Punjab State (Hodgson, Singh and Singh, 1963), the "Kabbad" citron of Damascus (Chapot, 1963f), and the "yemmakaipuli" of Coorg (India) also appear to fall in this group.
