= Johann Christoph Volkamer =

German botanist (1644–1720)

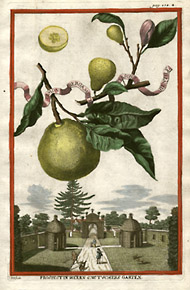
Bergamot-Fruit. Illustration from Nürnbergische Hesperides

Johann Christoph Volkamer (June 7, 1644 – August 26, 1720) was a German merchant, manufacturer and botanist.

== Life ==
Johann Christoph Volkamer (also: Volcamer, Volckamer, Volkammer, Volcameris) was the son of the physician Johann George Volkamer. He occupied himself with botany as a hobby, and maintained a garden in the today's Nurembergian Gostenhof district. He published a two volume work about citrus in 1708–1714, titled "Nurenberg Hesperides, or thorough description of the noble Citron, Lemon, and Bitter Orange fruits, How to, in this and neighboring areas, correctly plant, tend, maintain and reproduce them, Together with a comprehensive enumeration of most cultivars, partly actually grown at Nuremberg, partly imported to there from various foreign places ..."

In Volkamers time people thought the "golden apples of the Hesperides" of Greek mythology referred to citrus fruit. Starting from late 17th Century, there developed a collecting passion for instance among the aristocracy, who tried to outdo one another with the rarest and most bizarre citrus fruits, imported at great expense from south of the Alps and developing into a symbol of social status and power.

With this work the term "Hesperides" became the symbol for the flowering Nurembergian garden culture, which lasted from 1650 onwards up to the late 18th Century.

In Volkamers book he illustrated also the Nurembergian landscapes, city panoramas, and above all the gardens of the city, illustrated beside the citrus plants and their fruits by engraving.

He is said to be influenced by the work of Giovanni Baptista Ferrari.

== Works ==
- Nürnbergische Hesperides, Oder Gründliche Beschreibung Der Edlen Citronat, Citronen, und Pomerantzen-Früchte, Wie solche, in selbiger und benachbarten Gegend, recht mögen eingesetzt, gewartet, erhalten und fortgebracht werden, Samt einer ausführlichen Erzehlung der meisten Sorten, welche theils zu Nürnberg würcklich gewachsen, theils von verschiedenen fremden Orten dahin gebracht worden, Auf das accurateste in Kupffer gestochen, in Vier Theile eingetheilet und mit nützlichen Anmerckungen erkläret. Beneben der Flora, Oder Curiosen Vorstellung Verschiedener raren Blumen, Samt Einer Zugabe etlicher anderer Gewächse, und ausführlichem Bericht, wie eine richtig-zutreffende Sonnen-Uhr im Garten-Feld von Bux anzulegen, und die Gärten nach der Perspectiv leichtlich aufzureissen, Wie auch einem Bericht von denen in des Authoris Garten stehenden Colvmnis Milliaribvs / Herausgegeben von J. C. V., Nürnberg 1708.
- Obeliscus Constantinopolitanus oder kurtze Erklärung des zu Constantinopol auf der Renn-Bahn stehenden, nun aber auch in der nürnbergischen Vorstadt Gostenhof nachgehauenen und aufgerichteten Obelisci, Nuremberg 1713, Nachdruck Nuremberg 1985.
- Continvation der Nürnbergischen Hesperidvm, Oder: Fernere gründliche Beschreibung Der Edlen Citronat-, Citronen- und Pomeranzen-Früchte, mit einem ausführlichen Bericht, wie solche am besten zu warten und zu erhalten seyn; diejenigen Sorten, so theils zu Nürnberg gewachsen, theils von verschiedenen fremden Orten dahin gelanget auf das accurateste in Kupffer gestochen und nachgezeichnet worden; abermals in vier Theile eingetheilet, und mit gehörigen Anmerkungen erläutert; Benebenst einem Anhang von etlichen raren und fremden Gewächsen, als Der Ananas, des Palm-Baums, der Coccus-Nüsse, der Baum-Wolle u.a.m., welche ebenfalls in Kupffer-Rissen vorgestellet sind. Nürnberg, Frankfurt am Main und Leipzig, 1714.

== See also ==
- Volkameria
- Greek citron
