= Cedratine =

Distilled beverage (liqueur)

Cedratine is a distilled beverage (liqueur) produced from citrus fruits with an alcohol percentage between 36 and 40 percent.

It originated in Tunisia, where most of it is still produced. It is also popular in Corsica.

Cedratine can be consumed either at room temperature, cold, or served as the basis for many cocktails or fruit salads.

== See also ==
- List of liqueur brands
- List of lemon dishes and drinks
- Limoncello
