= Yemenite citron =

Variety of fruit

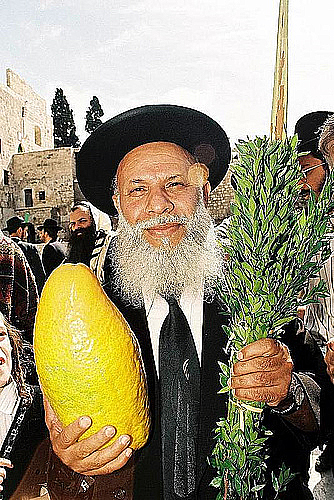
Yemenite Jew at the Western Wall with a large Yemenite etrog

The Yemenite citron (Hebrew: אֶתְרוֹג תֵּימָנִי, etrog teimani) (Note: In the Yemenite tradition, the word אתרוג is pronounced with a dotted ת and שוא נח.) is a variety of citron, usually containing no juice vesicles in its fruit's segments. The bearing tree and the mature fruit's size are somewhat larger than the trees and fruit of other varieties of citron.

== Classification ==
Despite its major differences from standard varieties of the most common original citron, the Yemenite citron was attested by a group of citrus and genetic experts to be a true variety of citron, and possesses a close genetic relation with the rest of the types. A brief documentation of this study was presented at the Global Citrus Germplasm Network.

The Yemenite kind is highly affiliated with the Moroccan citron which is traditionally cultivated in a remote area in the absence of any other citrus species.

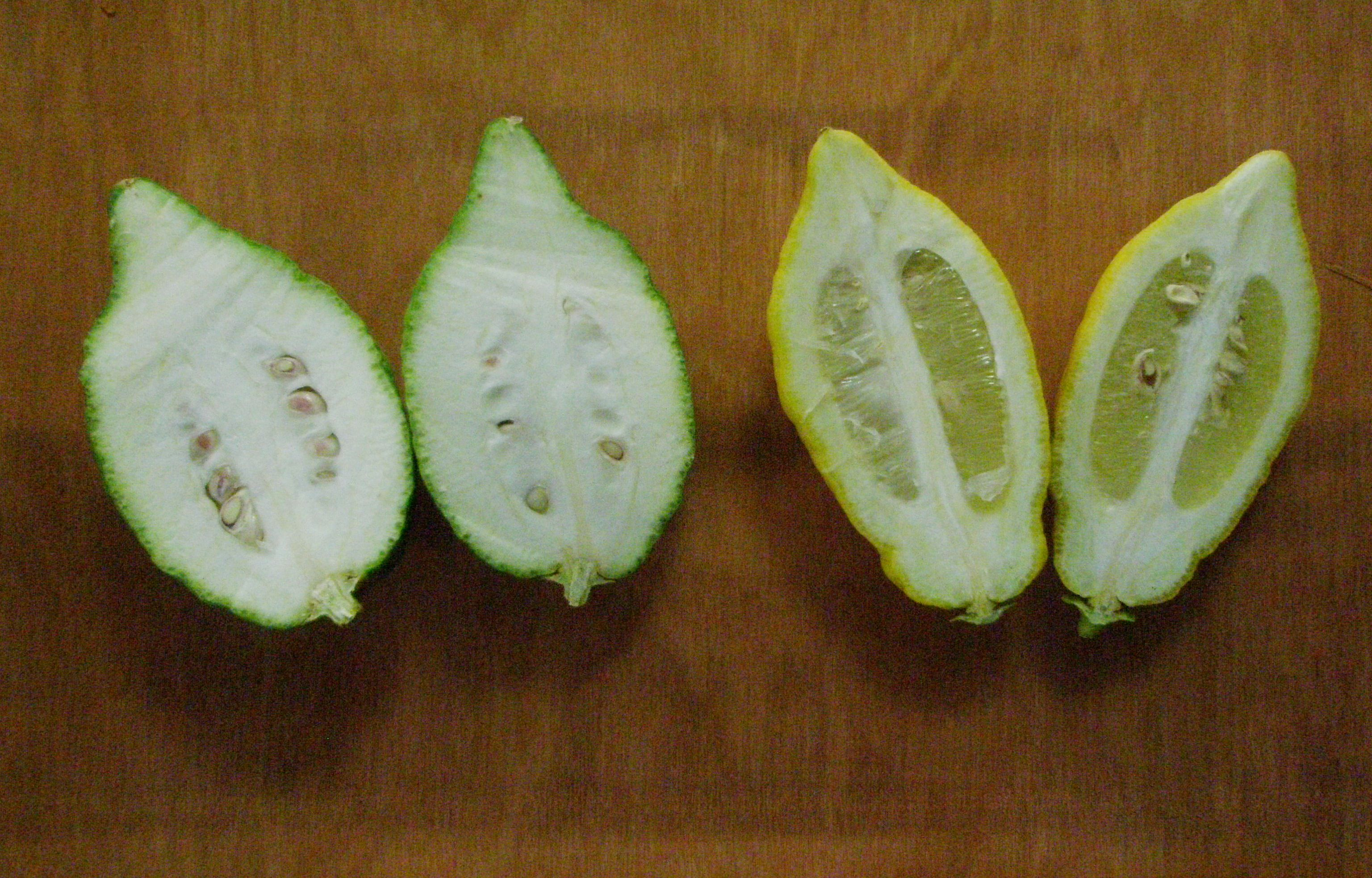
Cross section of a Yemenite citron (left), and a Balady citron ("Chazon Ish" selection); note the lack of pulp in the Yemenite kind.

== Role as Etrog ==
Although other varieties of pulpless citron, such as Buddha's hand, can be found in India and China, most Jewish cultures are not aware of them, therefore the Yemenite citron is the only pulpless citron used as etrog. According to the Yemenite tradition that is claimed to trace back to the first Temple, their kind was with them all the times.

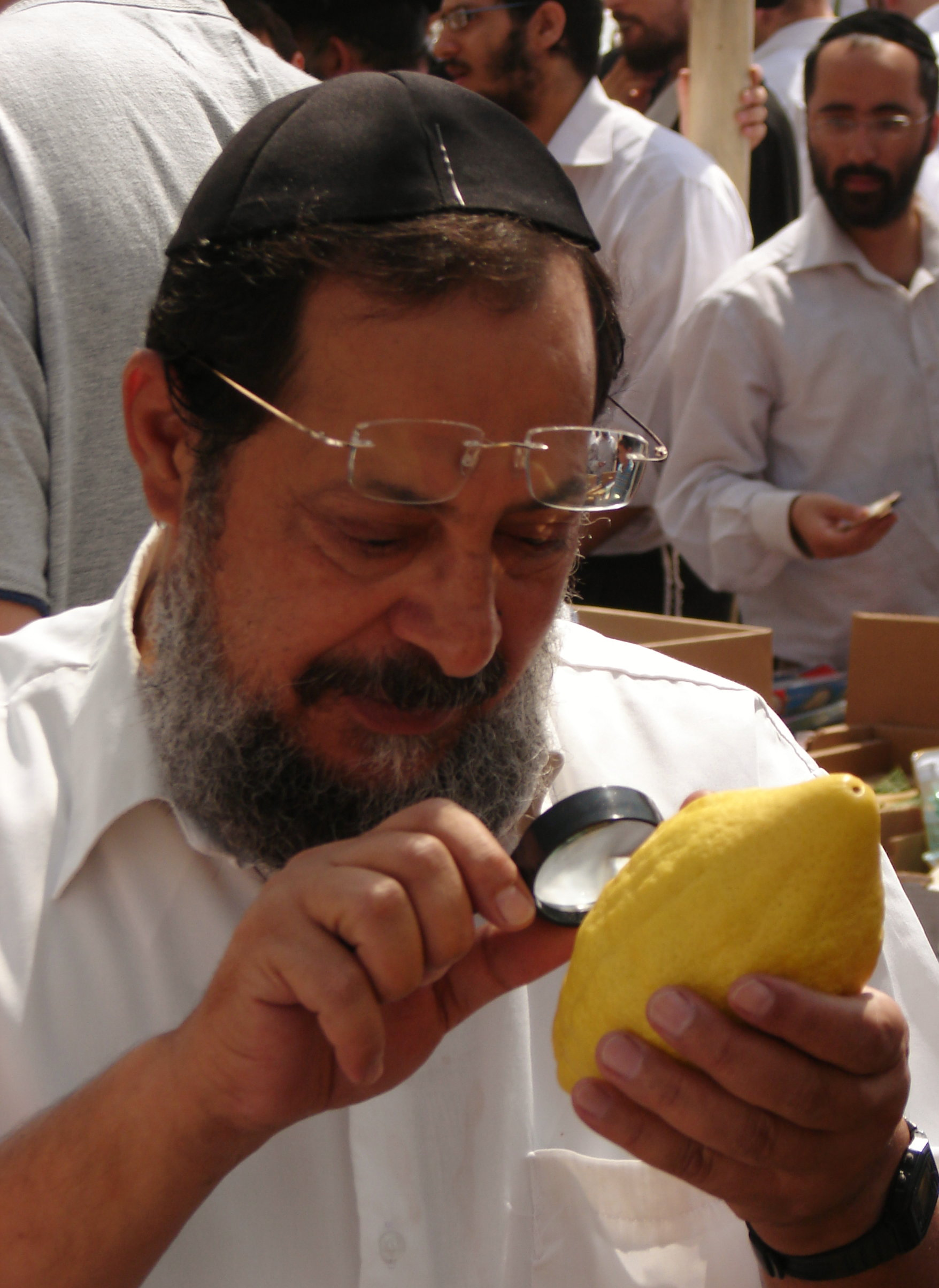
A man in Bnei Brak examines a Yemenite etrog for flaws.

=== Etrog haCushi ===
Etrog haCushi (Hebrew: אֶתְּרוֹג הַכּוּשִׁי) is mentioned in the Mishnah as well as in both the Babylonian (Succa 36a) and the Jerusalem Talmud (Succa 3:6). The most common interpretation is that the Biblical Cush refers to Ethiopia, and therefore Etrog haKuschi should also refer to something which could be called the Ethiopian citron.

The Ethiopian Jews did not follow the mitzva of four species, even though they did anticipate the Sukkot festival, as well as the rest of the Jewish ethnic divisions. This may have been due to their lack of ability to procure the species. Some believe that this is due to some Karaite influence, whose biblical interpretation indicates that the four species are only used as roofing for a sukkah (the S'chach), and not for a separate waving ritual.

However, the Yemenite citron is available in Ethiopia and its markets, where it is sold for consumption. According to Erich Isaac, the late researcher of citrus distribution, the Yemenite citron is synonymous with the Ethiopian citron, as a result of Ethiopian rule of Yemen in the past.

Alternatively, the "etrog haCushi" is understood by some simply as a citron with a very dark coloration. As such the 'Ethiopian etrog' is not an Etrog that comes from Ethiopia but rather an Etrog that is similar in color to the skin of the inhabitants of Ethiopia. This is the explanation given by Rashi (Succa 34a) and would explain why Yemenite citrons are and have always been traditionally used as an etrog even though the Mishna rules that an etrog haCushi cannot be used to fulfill the mitzva.

== Areas of cultivation ==
Growing un-grafted citrons in Yemen has some associated difficulties, particularly since citron is a highly susceptible plant.

The most common rootstock types that are currently used to graft citrus in Yemen are Sour orange (Citrus × aurantium) and Rough lemon (Citrus jhambiri), which are very helpful to prevent exocortis in Northern Yemen. The specific rootstock species are not carefully documented in Yemen and therefore difficult to detect, after the graft is done. However, throughout Yemen, grafting is not enough to prevent infection by Phytophthora gummosis, which can nonetheless still be controlled by appropriate horticultural practices.

The main cultivation area of the Yemenite citron today is Israel, where it is highly sought out for its beauty and large size.
