= Balady citron =

Variety of fruit

Balady citron (etrog)
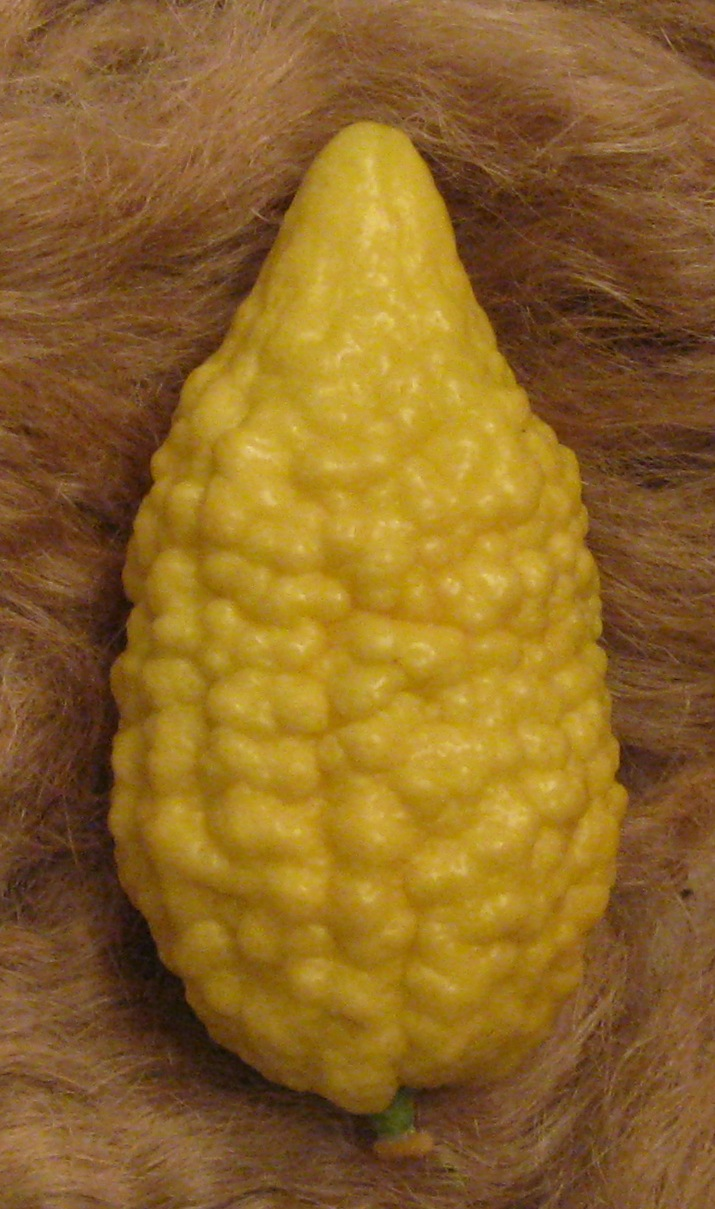
- Braverman sub-variety of Balady citron
- Species: C. medica L. var. Balady

The balady citron is a variety of citron, or etrog, grown in Israel, mostly for Jewish ritual purposes. Not native to the region, it was imported around 500 or 300 BCE by Jews for ritual purposes. Initially not widely grown in the land of Israel, Etrogim from the region were promoted and popularized in the 1870s by Rabbi Chaim Elozor Wax.

== Etymology ==
Balady (Arabic: بلدي) is Arabic for "native." Local Arab farmers began using this name in the mid-19th century to distinguish this variety from the Greek citron, which was cultivated along the Jaffa seashore.

The balady citron is an acidic variety, alongside the Florentine and Diamante citron from Italy, and the Greek citron.

== History ==
Citrus fruits are not native to Israel. According to Gallesio, Jews from Babylonia introduced the citron into Judea in around 500 BCE, while Tolkowsky believed that Greek settlers brought it from India around 200 years later during the 3rd century BCE. It is thought that the citron is the oldest cultivated fruit in the country. Being of ritual significance for Jews, the citron was exported abroad in small quantities during Roman times. During the 1800s, the Balady was grown on the outskirts of Nablus, Nazareth, Tiberias, Safed and Alma al-Shaib, in Umm al-Fahm and in Lifta village near Jerusalem. It was only in the middle of the 19th-century that Balady citrons began to feature significantly in the European market and a religious Jewish controversy subsequently erupted as to whether the citrons had been grafted and therefore deemed disqualified for ritual use.

In the 1870s, Rabbi Chaim Elozor Wax devoted himself to its cultivation and organized shipments to Europe. He felt the Balady citron had the strongest traditional lineage of species pureness, and claimed it was to be found in the wild when Nahmanides (d. 1270) arrived in the country. He wrote many letters to the rabbis, hoping to influence the diaspora to use the Balady citron. These letters were published in his responsa Nefesh Haya and the responsa of his correspondents, as well as in pamphlets addressing the Greek citron controversy. Under his influence, many Jews began to purchase the Balady instead of the Greek citron. While the variety was not domesticated, it was used by important scholars and pious Jews who believed in its purity and appropriateness. Rabbi Wax also saw the trade in this citron as an important source of economic income for the Jewish community in Palestine. He invested large sums in establishing orchards in Hittin, donating the profits to charity. In 1875, Wax planted 600 trees, and by 1883, over 40,000 citrons had been exported.

The pro-Zionist newspapers HaMelitz and HaLevanon were instrumental in stirring up interest in etrog cultivation in Palestine, which was seen as important in paving the way for Jewish independence. The Greek citron has been introduced for plantation in the 1840s by Sephardic Jews with the financial backing of Sir Moses Montefiore. The new Greek-Jaffa variety was more commercially successful than Balady. Despite all efforts, the Balady was still unable to compete with the Greek citron, and at the beginning of the 20th century, its cultivation was very primitive and limited. The Balady was considered unattractive, and some of the new immigrants continued using varieties they were accustomed to in the diaspora.

The supporters of the Balady were strained in a conflict of interest. While the Greek citron grown in Jaffa showed a good economic future, the Halachic intentions were against it. As a partial solution, the Greek-Jaffa citron was occasionally grafted onto Balady rootstock. The progeny achieved the beautiful properties of the scion type, while the possible influence of lemon rootstock was assumed to be flushed, and replaced with that of the most kosher Balady rootstock. At some point, Rabbi Wax was forced to relent and commence topworking to part of his orchard, to replace part of the crop with the Greek citron.

== Rescue and selections ==
The Old Yishuv rabbis Shmuel Salant and Meir Auerbach supported the progeny of Umm el-Fahm, but those declined quickly. Later, some Israeli rabbis did their utmost for the rescue of Balady. Each collected propagation material from a different place and brought it into cultivation under close supervision. This is how a diversity of sub-varieties or selections with different names developed.

The list of rabbis who were instrumental includes (arranged in order of date): Rabbi Zarach Reuven Braverman founder and dean of the Yeshiva Mea Shearim and Rabbi Yosef Chaim Sonnenfeld; which both where close disciples of Rabbi Yehoshua Leib Diskin. Braverman's citron was planted by in the orchard of Yehoshua Stampfer and Zonnenfeld's (today known as 'Kibilewitz')' in the same orchard, but in the time of his son-in-law, Pinhas Globman.

When the Chazon Ish reached the Holy Land, he made his own selection according to his satisfaction. To Yakov Halperin, founder of Zichron Meir in Bnei Brak, he gave plantings of the variety called Halperin-Chazon Ish; and to Rabbi Michel Yehuda Lefkowitz, the variety called Lefkowitz-Chazon Ish.

Rabbi Abraham Isaac Kook promoted the intraspecific graft from the Greek citron onto Balady citron rootstock, and granted his Hechsher for this, believing that it was a practical solution to grow beautiful etrogs that were also kosher. However, he still acknowledged the halachic promotion of those etrogs cultivated at different Arabic villages, which were never as nice but were praised for not being grafted.

Balady citron varieties are still grown and sold today in diaspora as well as in Israel, and are favored by the followers of the Brisker Rov and the Chazon Ish.

Local cultivars are also used in Israeli cuisine for jams, juice, and alcoholic drinks.

== See also ==
- Agricultural research in Israel
- Agriculture in Israel
- Agriculture in Palestine
- Jewish holidays
- Jewish cuisine
- Palestinian cuisine
