= Florentine citron =

Citrus fruit and plant

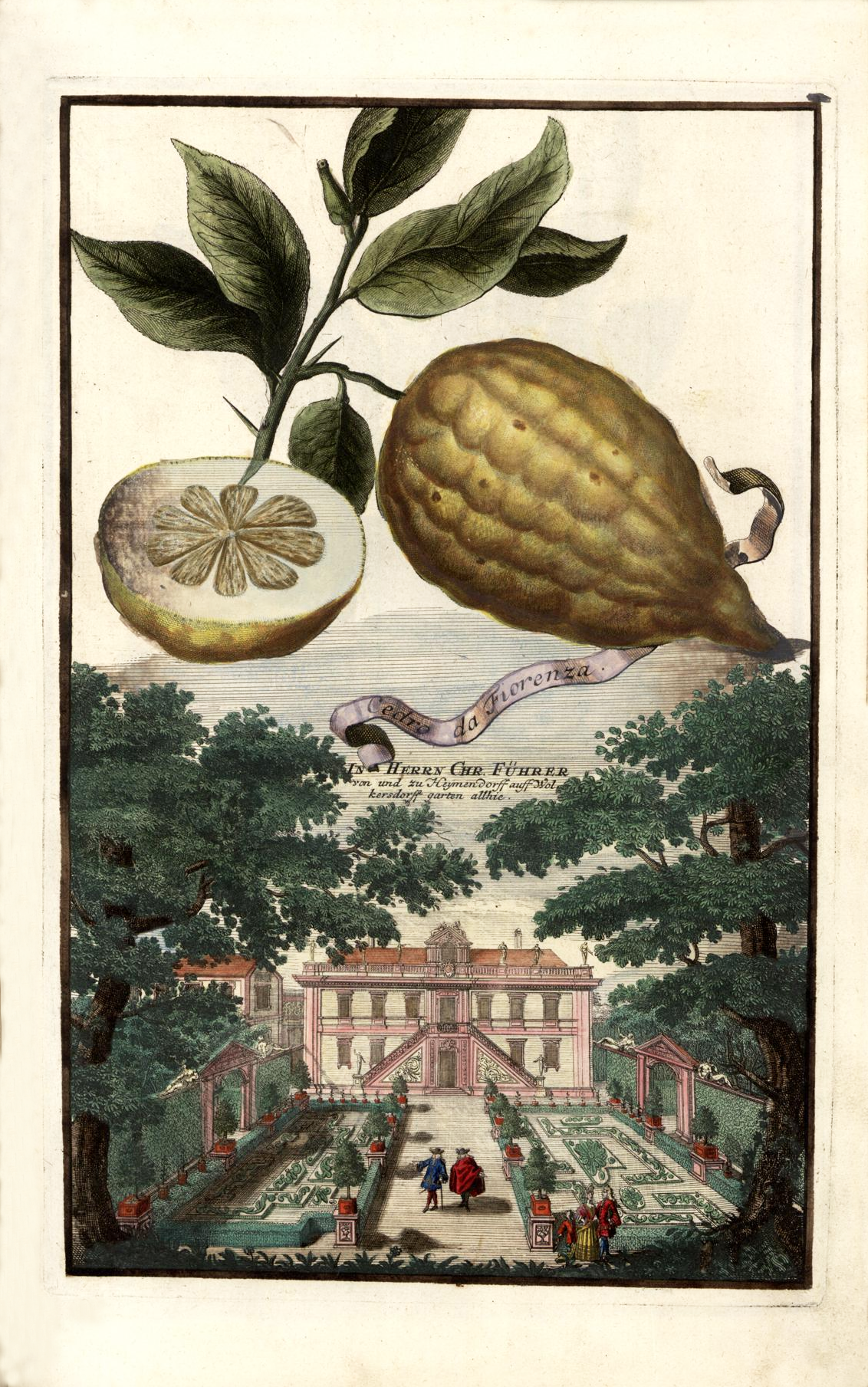
- Species: C. × limonimedica Lush.
- Cultivar: Florentina
- Origin: Florence

The Florentine citron – citron hybrid of Florence (Italian: cedrato di Firenze) – is a very fragrant citrus fruit, which is named after its most known origin of cultivation. Its scientific name is Citrus × limonimedica 'Florentina' Lush.

== Source and genetics ==
This variety or hybrid originated in Italian Renaissance gardens. Today it is considered to be a lemon × citron hybrid.

It's known to be one parent of the Bizzarria chimaera.

== History and uses ==
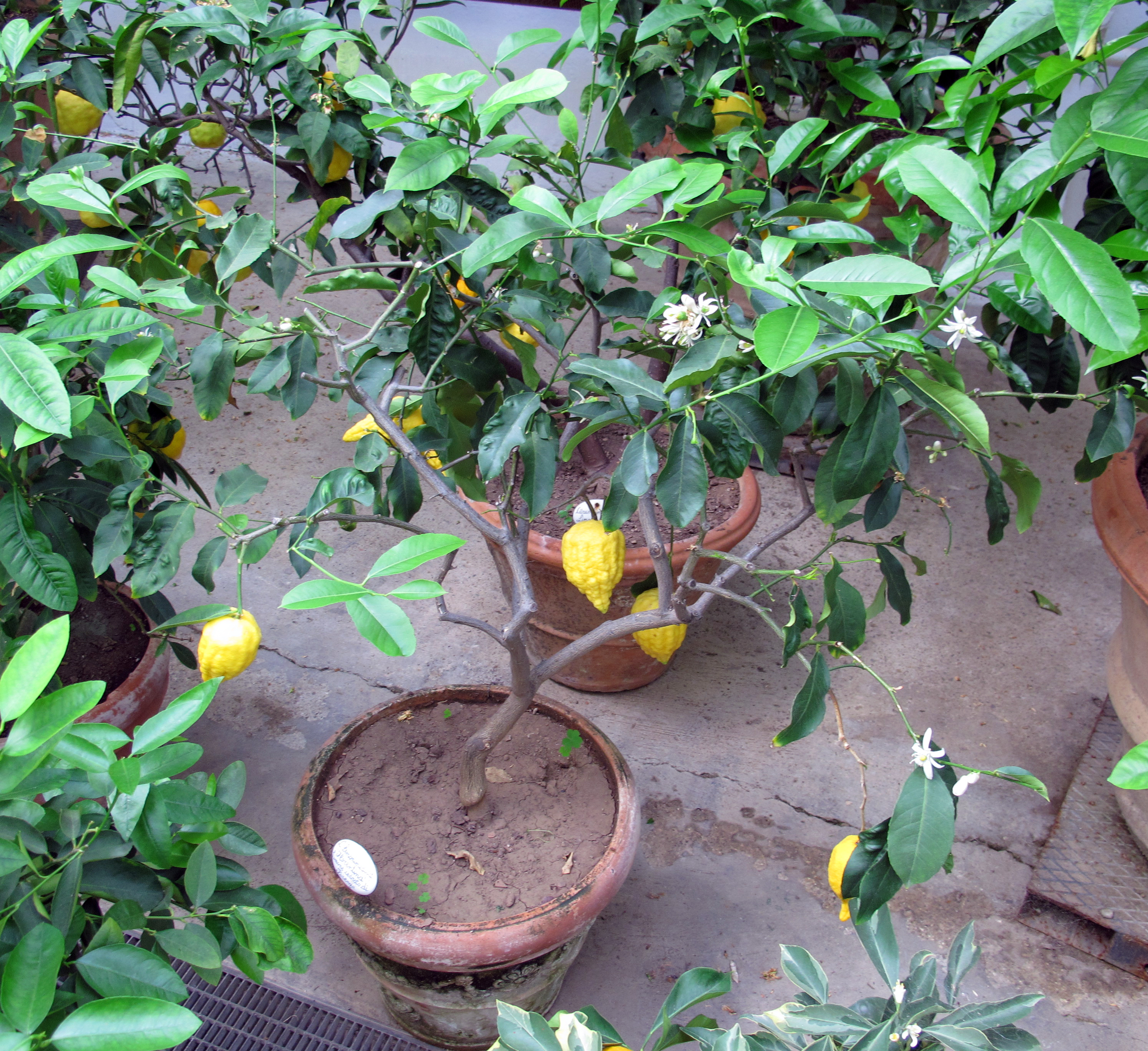
The Florentine hybrid

It was first described by Johann Christoph Volkamer in his Nürnbergische Hesperides, who gave a detailed account of original citrus types, mutations and hybrids, along with professional illustrations. He has many illustrations of the Florentine citron growing by itself, or on the Bizzaria tree. Those illustrations resemble the way it looks today.

He also writes that it has a very pleasant fragrance, similar to the Greek citron.

The most popular Italian variety, namely the Genoese citron, was well respected and praised by Ashkenazic and Sephardic communities.
