= Corsican citron =

Variety of fruit

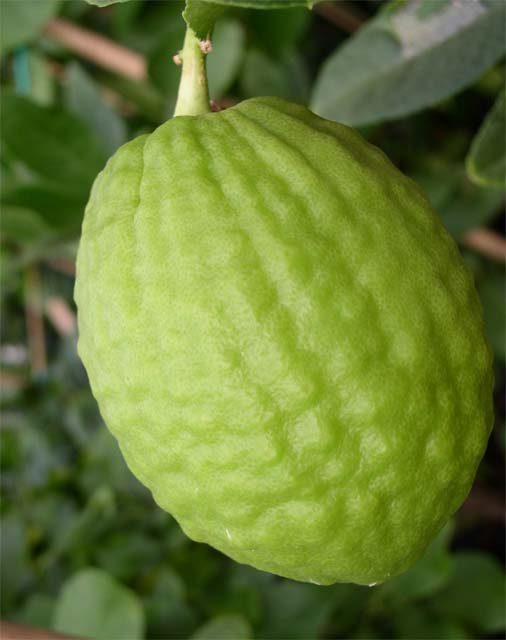
Corsican citron

The Corsican citron (called alimea in Corsican and cedrat in French) is a citron variety that contains a non-acidic (sweet) pulp. Occasionally it is also called a 'citron of commerce'.

The name is from its cultivation center at the French Island of Corsica, where its primary use was for candying the rind. This practice was particularly economically significant during a boom period from the 1820s to the 1920s. It is said to be one of the first citrus fruits to reach Corsican soil. The cultivar is also grown in other areas of France such as Provence, in southern Spain, in the islands of Puerto Rico and in the United States, in Florida and California.

== Origin ==
Citrons originated from the Himalayan foothills, and were over time introduced into the Mediterranean area, with the oldest evidence of citron there dating to the fifth century BCE. The first report of a sweet citron, was made in the late 12th century, by Ibn al-’Awwâm, who in his Book of Agriculture, described a 'sweet citron with light-colored buds and few, short thorns'. The relation between this variety and the Corsican citron is unknown, however, it is noteworthy as it may provide clues to where the acidless phenotype of the Corsican citron originated from. Due to the particular distribution of alleles of nuclear SSR markers between the Corsican citron, and a closely related cultivar, the Poncire Commun, it is possible that the Corsican citron originated from self-fertilisation of the Poncire Commun variety. Poncire Commun has six heterozygous loci, while the Corsican citron is homozygous at these loci, which is potentially a product of self-fertilisation

== Description ==
=== Tree ===
The Corsican citron variety is a slow-growing tree that reaches a height of about 3 to 5 metres (9.8 to 16.4 ft), open and spreading and rather small. It is medium-thorny with some large, stout spines. Its trunk is creamy white, and its leaves are medium large, oblong, with a blunt point and a crenate margin. The white fragrant blossom appears in March–April, and fruits can be harvested from October to November. Flowers, buds and new growth are not purple-tinted, and do not contain anthocyanins.

=== Fruit ===
The fruits are ellipsoid to slightly egg-shaped, with slightly depressed and radially furrowed base. It has an indistinct to suppressed apical nipple and is lemon-yellow when ripe with a thick fleshy albedo. It is 7–10 cm (2.8–3.9 in) in diameter and 8–14 cm (3.1–5.5 in) in length. Its rind is 3–4 cm (1.2–1.6 in) thick and is sweet with some bitter after-taste; its surface rather rough, bumpy, and commonly somewhat ribbed. The flesh of the fruit is crisp and solid, it has a sweet flavour without acid, its juice having a pH of 5.5. The average number of segments is 11–14. When given enough fertilizer and water, one tree can produce up to 80-100 fruits. It starts producing fruits in its third year. The seeds are white-yellowish, and there are around 25 to 40 monoembryonic seeds in each fruit. They lack proanthocyanidins.

=== Essential oil ===
The essential oil of its peel contains limonene, γ-terpinene and monoterpene hydrocarbons as its major components. Its leaf essential oil has higher contents of geraniol, nerol and (E)-phytol and lower amounts of limonene than other citron cultivars. Additionally, this essential oil has the highest concentration of oxygenated monoterpenes and the lowest concentration of monoterpene hydrocarbons, compared to other citron cultivars.

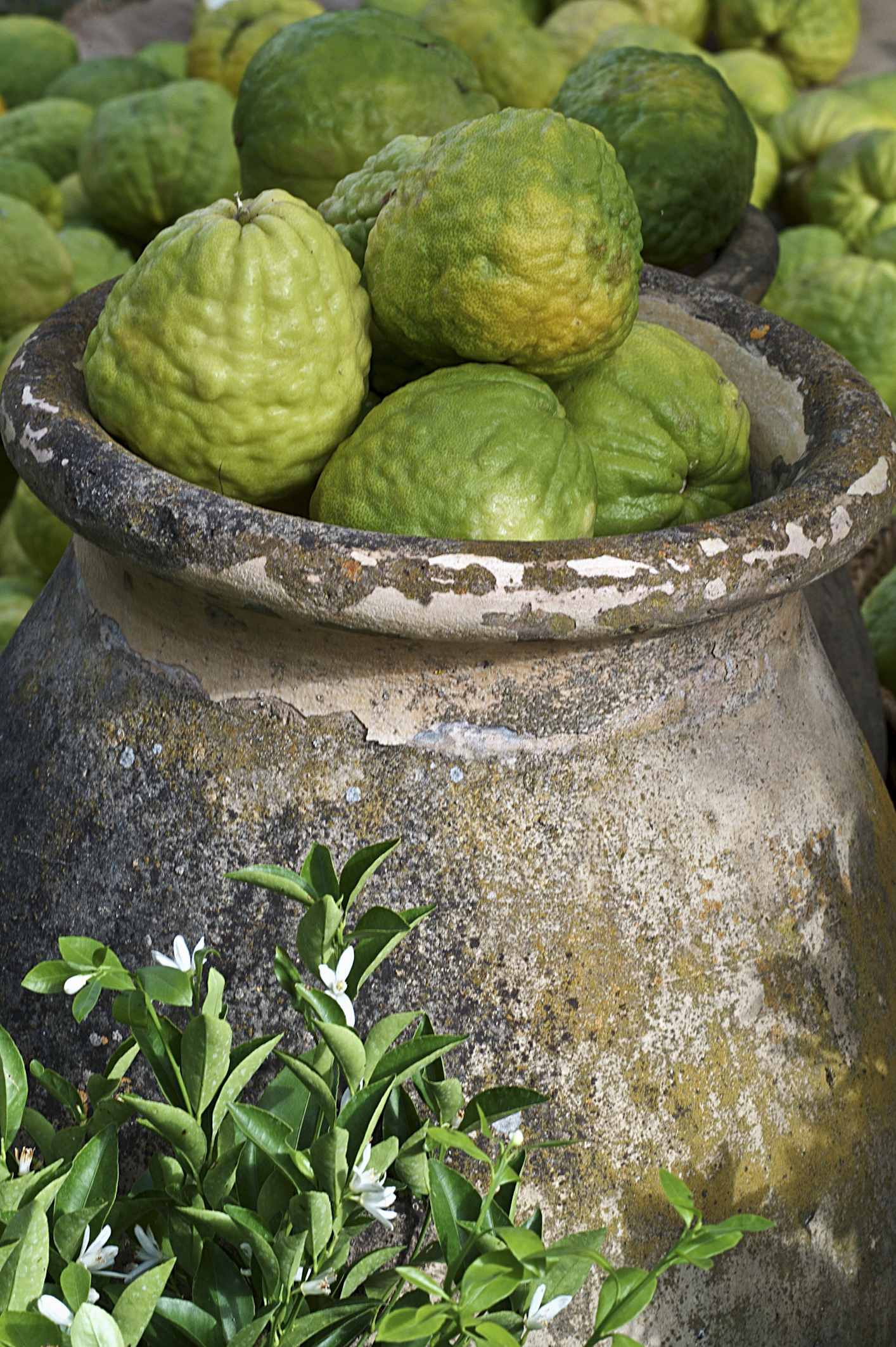
Corsican citrons in an earthenware pot

=== Genetics ===
The Corsican citron is genetically closest to the "Poncire Commun" variety of citron, which unlike it, is acidic and contains anthocyanins. Genetically, this difference is shown in the deletion of 1313 nucleotides in the 3' terminus of a bHLH protein named Noemi. In the Corsican citron, this deletion is homozygous while in Poncire Commun, it is heterozygous. However sequences of the Ruby gene, and the bHLH gene MYC2 between the two varieties showed no difference.

== Diseases and pests ==
The main pests of the Corsican citron are the citrus blossom moth, leaf miner, aphids, spider mites and scale insects such as red scale, cottony cushion scale, and citrus mealybug and a mediterranean ant. Phytophthora sp. continues to be a major disease of the Corsican citron, which is why nowadays, most Corsican citrons are produced from grafts. According to one study, using the Volkamer lemon as rootstock for the Corsican citron has more advantages than using the sour orange or the alemow, as in addition to its resistance to Phytophthora sp., it is also resistant to the citrus tristeza virus, and more cold tolerant than the other commonly used rootstocks.

In older reports of diseases and pests afflicting the Corsican citron, gummosis (caused by Phytophthora) and sooty mold in conjunction with insects of the genus Kermes are often mentioned. To treat gummosis, affected branches were pruned, and a deep trench was created around the tree, with boiling tar sometimes applied to exposed pruned roots. Citron trees affected by sooty mold were washed, and its leaves syringed with a lime solution, alternatively, tobacco juice or soap. The kermes insect were treated by rubbing the wood with a solution of similar ingredients.

== History ==
The Corsican citron arrived in Corsica around the 18th century, perhaps introduced by the Genoans. Cultivation started on Cap Corse and shifted to the Eastern Plain. Originally, it may have been planted as a substitute for grapevines, as these had been devastated by phylloxera. It became commercially important in 1820s to the 1920s, as it brought high prices, and was favoured for its high quality. In fact, its price quadrupled between 1870 and 1875 from around 0,25 francs per kilogram to 1 franc per kilogram. With 5000- 6000 metric tons per year, and 500 to 600 ha of orchards, Corsica was the world's leading producer of citron in the 1890s.

This success was in spite of many environmental challenges to its growth there. For example, Corsican citrons are quite cold sensitive- even more so than lemons and oranges- and Corsica is just at its northernmost limit. The cold winters of 1868 and 1869 almost wiped out citron production across Corsica. This cold sensitivity restricted Corsican citron orchards to low altitudes of the island, and stone walls were erected to protect the trees from cold winds in the winter. Fertilizer was hardly available due to high costs for importing artificial fertilizer and low supply of manure due to few farms on the islands. Finally, labour costs were high due to the presence of malaria in the summers. However, the high price of the citrons due to high demand for its candied peel, and Phytophthora sp. destroying Italy's citron crops, motivated the expansion of the Corsican citron industry on the island.

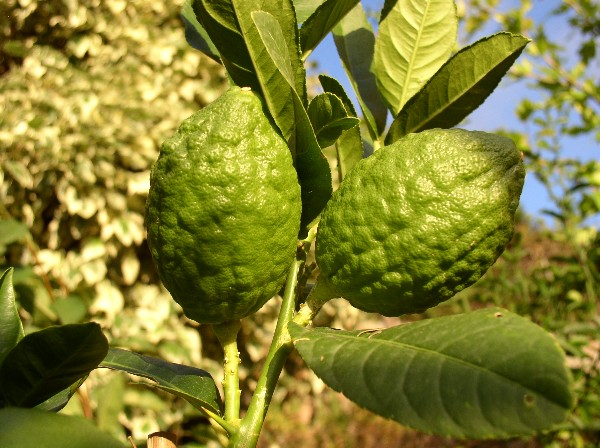
Corsican citrons on the tree

Traditionally, the Corsican citron was one of the most important varieties employed in succade production. Even though Corsican citrons were cultivated around the Mediterranean area, those that grew in Corsica, gained a reputation for its beauty and superior quality. Whole or halved fruit used to be cured in seawater for 30–40 days and shipped to Genoa, Livorno and Marseille. The preparation of the fruits in this way, caused the rinds to become transparent, and lose any bitterness. Once they arrived at their destination, the fruits were de-pulped and the rinds were soaked in cold water for days and boiled to extract the salt. Then the rinds were immersed in syrup, with increasing concentrations of sugar over time, and dried. They were subsequently shipped around Europe for use in baking. In England, it was used in plum pudding during the 19th century. There were some candying factories in Bastia, which gave citron growers some independence from mainland buyers. However, due to French sugar tariff regulations, these factories were only allowed to buy citrons sourced in Corsica, which allowed Corsican citron growers to demand inflated prices for their fruits. This led to a decline in the local Corsican citron candying industry. The Italian government allowed a drawback on sugar used in candied fruit, which gave an advantage to the Corsican citron candying industry in Livorno, despite its relatively few workers. The Corsican citron was introduced to the United States in 1891.

The cultivation of Corsican citrons on Corsica, was hit hard by the lack of sugar during World War 1 and competition from Italy, Greece and Puerto Rico. Corsican citron farmers on Corsica formed a union called the Société Coopérative des Producteurs de cédrats (Co-operative Society of Citron Producers), to protest against low prices offered by buyers from Livorno, around 1927. However, Corsican citron production continued to decline reaching a low of only 5 acres of citron orchards in 1986. In 1986, 80% of Corsican citrons were grown in Puerto Rico, with Greece and Italy being respectively, the second and third biggest producers.

== Uses ==
In 2022, there were five commercial growers of the Corsican citron on Corsica, which amounts to 15 ha across the island. The majority of Corsican citrons (80-90%) grown are used for candying, jams, and liqueurs such as cédratine. About 10% are sold fresh markets in mainland France and locally, while the rest is used in cosmetics and perfumes. However, its low ratio of flavedo to fruit mass, and bumpy rind make essential oil extraction from the rind, inefficient. Whole or halved candied Corsican citrons (rather than diced, like in its boom) are sometimes sold as a gourmet food.

=== Cultural significance ===
Despite being cultivated widely in Corsica for a century, it was only of minimal importance to Corsican cuisine. While Corsican citrons had been used to make jam or to flavour fiadone, most Corsican citrons produced were exported, and not used within Corsica. However, the Corsican citron was important to the Jewish holiday of Sukkot, where it was used as an etrog. Corsican citrons for this purpose were harvested earlier (around August), and sold under the name vittima. For a short while, Genoan competitors spread rumours that Corsican citrons were being produced by grafted plants (which would cause them not to be kosher), however this was debunked by a rabbi from Frankfurt.
