= Sukkah (Talmud) =

Book of the Mishnah and Talmud

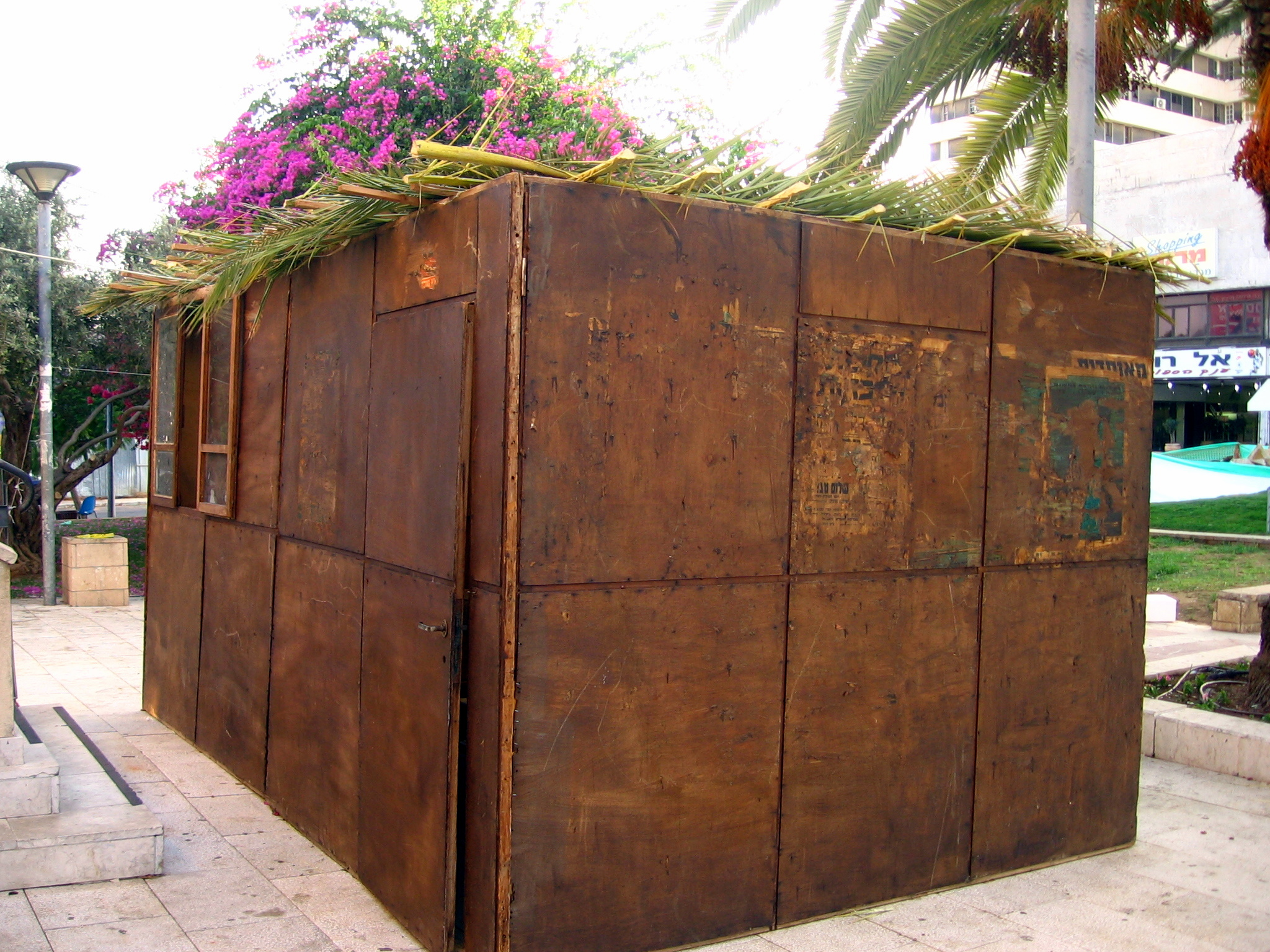
- Sukkah in Great Synagogue of Herzliya (2007/5767)

Tractate of the Talmud
- Seder: Moed
- Number of mishnahs: 53
- Chapters: 5
- Babylonian Talmud pages: 56
- Jerusalem Talmud pages: 26
- Tosefta chapters: 4

Sukkah (Hebrew: סוכה, hut) is a tractate of the Mishnah and Talmud. Its laws are discussed as well in the Tosefta and both the Babylonian Talmud and Jerusalem Talmud. In most editions it is the sixth volume of twelve in the Order (Mishnaic section) of Moed. Sukkah deals primarily with laws relating to the Jewish holiday of Sukkot. It has five chapters.

== Mishnah ==
Mishnah Sukkah contains five chapters. Included in its scope are the Sukkah, or hut, which is lived in during Sukkot, the laws concerning each of the four species of vegetation which are waved during prayers over the holiday, and Simchat Beit HaShoeivah, the Celebration of the Water-Drawing (Hebrew: שמחת בית השואבה, Simhat Beit Ha-Sho'evah), which took place at the Temple in Jerusalem on the nights of Sukkot.

- Chapter one begins with a discussion in the first mishnah of the maximum and minimum height of a Sukkah, the required number of walls to make it kosher, and the amount of shade required in relation to sunlight. Other mishnayot (mishnayot 2-11) in chapter one discusses the time when the sukkah should appropriately be made for the holiday and the intentionality in building the sukkah, and the materials that may be used for the s'chach, or shade covering on the roof of the sukkah.
- Chapter two discusses the obligation to reside in the sukkah, how one fulfills this obligation, and who is exempt from the obligation. Included in the discussion of the mishnah are such subjects as sleeping in the sukkah (mishna 1), eating in the sukkah, and the extent to which inclement weather affects the mitzvah of residing in a sukkah. The mishna (5-7) notes that women, children, and slaves are exempt from the mitzvah of residing in the sukkah.
- Chapter three begins with a discussion of the lulav or closed frond of the date palm tree. Mishnayot 1-3 of chapter three discuss the minimum requirements for the myrtle branch and the willow to fulfill the mitzvah of lulav. This is followed by a discussion of the laws of the kosher etrog, the laws of binding the lulav, and the prayers that were said in the Temple in the ceremonies surrounding the lulav on Sukkot.

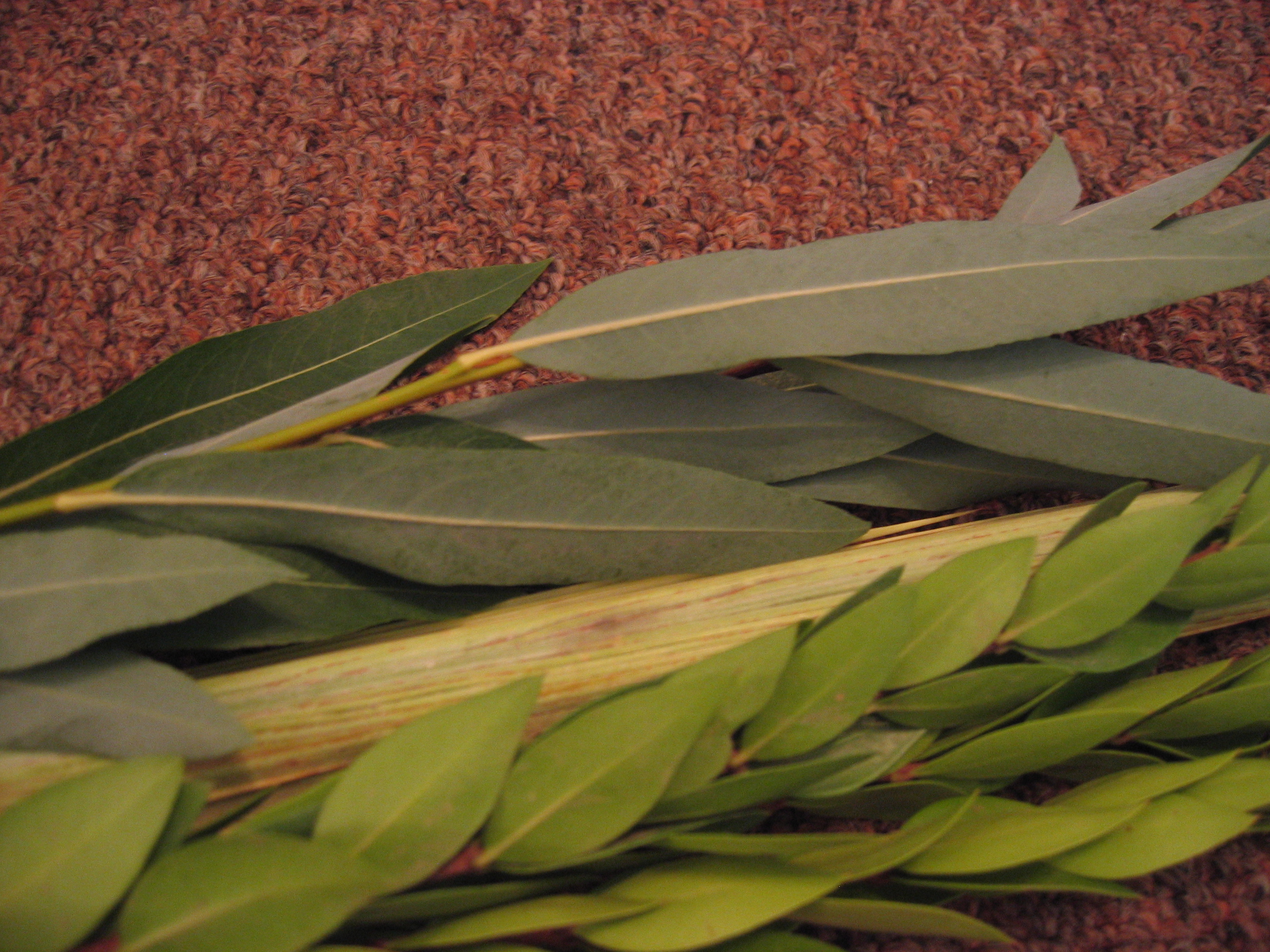
The two aravot branches of the Four Species (rear), along with the lulav (center) and hadassim branches (fore).

- Chapter four begins with the first mishnah on the number of days on which the rituals of sukkot were to be performed; i.e., whether the mitzvah of lulav and/ or aravah should be performed also on the Sabbath day during the seven day holiday of Sukkot. The mishnah proceeds to discuss the manner in which the lulav mitzvah was performed in the Temple and then similarly discusses the aravah ceremony. This chapter concludes with a discussion of the water libation ceremony or Nisukh ha-mayim.
- Chapter five continues to describe the water libation ceremony in the first mishna and discusses the prohibition to play the flute on the Sabbath and on the Yom Tov or festival day. The second mishnah of the fifth chapter emphasizes the great joy of the water libation ceremony. The subsequent mishnayot deal with the shofar blasts and then the sacrifices in the Temple on Sukkot.

== Tosefta ==
The Tosefta of Sukkah is only four chapters. There are noteworthy aggadot included in Tosefta sukkah. Worthy of mention is the legend of the miraculous well in the desert (3:2) and likewise the description of the great synagogue of Alexandria in chapter four of the Tosefta (4:6) in which the various tradesmen in Alexandria are said to have sat alongside their colleagues during the prayers. The story of Bilga the daughter of Miriam who married a non-Jewish soldier is also told in the Tosefta (4:28). It relates that the ring of Bilgah in the Temple is stuck and closed forever because she apostasized and intermarried with a soldier from the kings of Greece. When the Gentile soldiers came and entered the Temple, Miriam struck the top of the altar. She cried out to it: "Lukos, Lukos" or "wolf, wolf," you have destroyed the wealth of Israel and do not help Israel in the time of its distress!

== Talmud ==
Chapter one included discussion of the positions on the minimum and maximum height of the sukkah and the minimum requirements for its walls. The conclusion of the discussion is that the sukkah may be no less than ten tefachim, and no more than twenty amot/cubits in height. The shade in the sukkah must come from the s'chach and not the walls. The chapter includes extensive discussion of the number of walls and what constitutes a third wall. The s'chach must grow from the ground and not be an object that can become ritually impure. The rabbis note that as a result if the s'chach were branches that were manufactured for a purpose, such as using a flax plant to make linen clothing, they would be susceptible to impurity and could not be used for a sukkah covering.

Chapter two of sukkah opens with a discussion of the mishna's statement about sleeping in a bed in the sukkah. The gemara proceeds to discuss the ability of a tent to serve as a barrier for ritual impurity. Thereupon there is a discussion of Tractate Parah and the means by which priestly children were able to draw water from Pool of Siloam while maintaining their purity as they sat on the backs of oxen. The Talmud connects the discussion of the red heifer's ashes to the s'chach discussion by wondering whether the ritual impurity can be blocked by an ox in the same way that a bed may serve as a tent covering which would mean that it would interfere with the fulfillment of sitting in a sukkah if one sat under a bed.(21a-b) Sukkah 22a-b discusses the suitability of a sukkah whose shade is so thick that stars are not visible from within the sukkah. Sukkah 22b-23 discusses the efficacy of using a live animal as a base for a sukkah or as a wall of a sukkah. The position of Rabbi Meir is that a live animal cannot be used for the wall of a sukkah. His position is that a live animal also cannot be used for a symbolic lehi, or post, in an eruv for carrying on the Sabbath, nor for a covering for a grave. The amora Abaye explains that Rabbi Meir is concerned that the animal may die and that is why Rabbi Meir prohibits the use of a live animal as a wall. In contrast to Rabbi Meir, the tanna Rabbi Yehuda allows for the use of a live animal as a sukkah wall. The Talmud understand this specific argument about a sukkah wall as having larger meaning regarding whether we should be concerned about changes in the status quo, as Rabbi Meir would be concerned about death or a negative change, whereas Rabbi Yehuda would not be concerned. Sukkah 23b raises objections to the position of Abaye from passages elsewhere in which Abaye explains that Rabbi Meir is concerned about change in the status quo, but Rabbi Yehuda is not, which is the opposite of their approach in Sukkah 23a according to Abaye's explanation. To answer the inconsistency in the position of Abaye, the Talmud states that we should reverse the text so that Rabbi Meir's position elsewhere is consistent with his approach in Sukkah, namely that he is concerned about negative changes in the status quo. The Talmud also raises an objection from an inconsistency in Rabbi Yehuda's position because on Yom Kippur he worries that the wife of the high priest, kohen gadol, may die, but the answer is that Yom Kippur is an exceptional case. Sukkah 24b states in the Mishna that a tree enclosure may function as kosher walls for a sukkah. The Talmud explains that this is when the tree and its leaves are securely tied in place.

The third chapter of tractate sukkah is titled "The Stolen Lulav", after the words that begin the Mishna to the third chapter. The chapter deals with the laws pertaining to the verse in Leviticus 23:40 which states that on the holiday one must take "the fruit of a beautiful tree, branches of a date palm, boughs of a dense-leaved tree, and willows of the brook". The Talmud seeks to determine the identity of these species to fulfill the commandment of the Torah. In addition, it discusses further laws regarding the obligation to take the species, including the number of species to take and the manner in which to take it. Branches of the date is understood to refer to the lulav, a dense leaved tree to the myrtle, and "willows of the brook" refers to the willow. The fruit of the beautiful tree is the etrog. On page 30, the Talmud discusses why a stolen lulav is unfit and explains that it is because it was acquired through transgression. As Rabbi Johanan explains the verse in Isaiah 61:8 states that the Lord hates robbery. On page 32 the story is told of an old lady who approached Rav Nachman with distress, saying that the Reish Galuta (Exilarch) and his Boyz were sitting in a stolen sukkah. She said the sukkah was stolen, but he said the sukkah was valid but she has rights to the monetary value of the wood. On page 32, the Talmud continues the discussion of a lulav that was taken from the grounds of an idol worshipping city. Pursuant to the discussion, the Talmud notes that there is a dispute regarding whether a lulav, or palm branch, taken from the gates of hell, that is the valley of Hinnom by Jerusalem (Gei-Hinnom), may be used to fulfill the obligation. On 32b the Talmud proceeds with an identification of the dense-leaved tree as being synonymous with the myrtle branch. It rejects identification of this tree with an olive tree, an oriental plane tree, and oleander.

== External links and resources ==
- Mishna fulltext (Hebrew)
- Talmud Bavli fulltext (Hebrew)
- Introduction to Tractate Sukkah and Glossary, Mishnah Nomit Program: Week 33 - Monday - 10 July 2000
