= Hoshana Rabbah =

Seventh day of the Jewish festival of Sukkot occurring on the 21st of Tishrei

- Official name: הוֹשַׁעְנָא רַבָּה
- Also called: Translation: "The Great Supplication"
- Observed by: Jews
- Type: Jewish
- Significance: The culmination of Sukkot.
- Date: 21st day of Tishrei
- 2025 date: Sunset, 12 October – nightfall, 13 October (14 October outside of Israel)
- 2026 date: Sunset, 1 October – nightfall, 2 October (3 October outside of Israel)
- 2027 date: Sunset, 21 October – nightfall, 22 October (23 October outside of Israel)
- 2028 date: Sunset, 10 October – nightfall, 11 October (12 October outside of Israel)
- Related to: Culmination of Sukkot (Tabernacles)

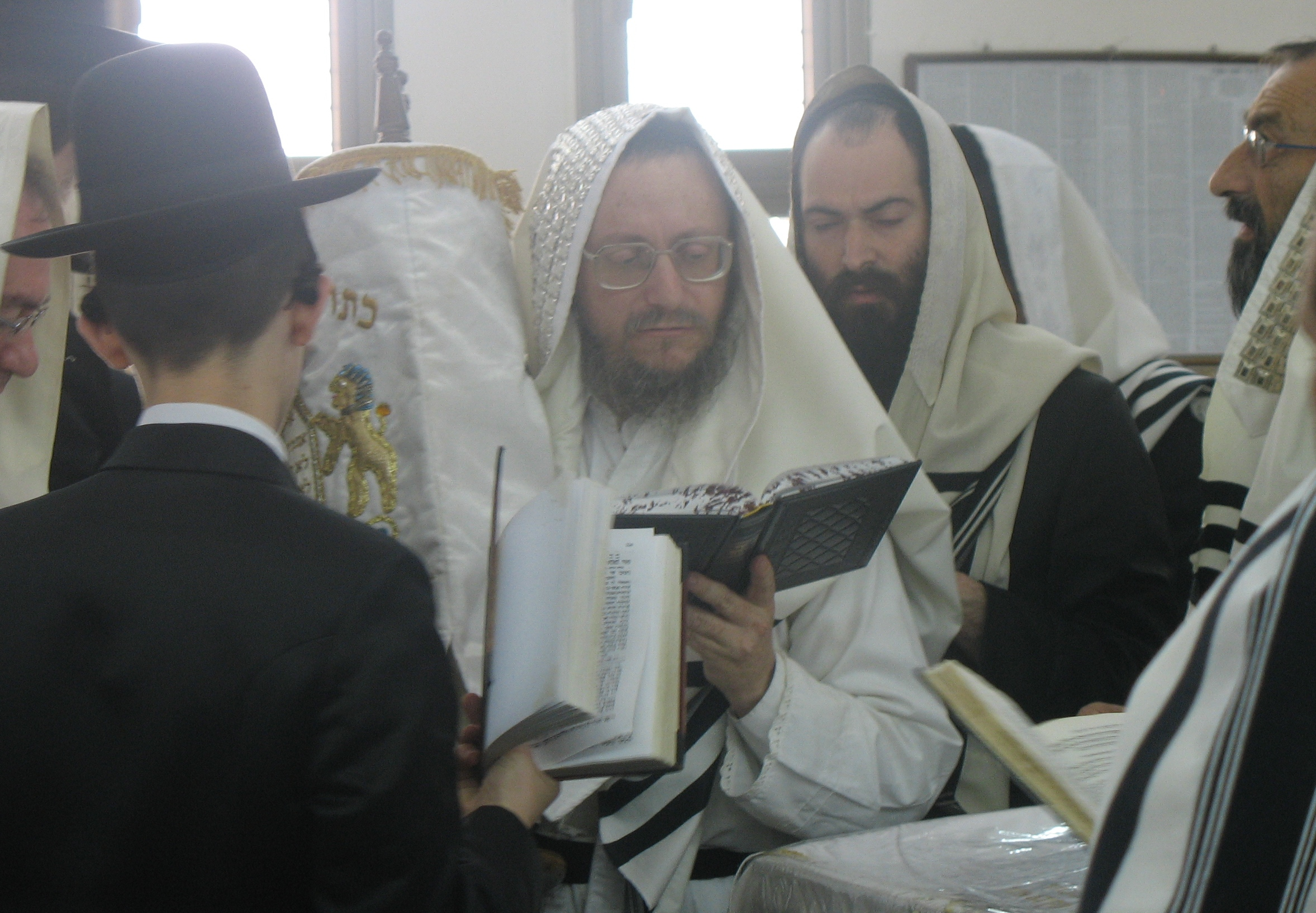
A Hasidic rebbe reading prayers during Hoshana Rabbah

Hoshana Rabbah (Hebrew: הוֹשַׁעְנָא רַבָּה, lit. 'Great Hoshana/Supplication'; Imperial Aramaic: הוֹשַׁעְנָא רַבָּא) is the seventh day of the Jewish holiday of Sukkot, as well as the 21st day of the Hebrew month of Tishrei. Hoshana Rabbah is marked by a special synagogue service during which seven circuits around the synagogue's Torah scrolls (ספרי תורה, sifrei Torah) are made by congregants while holding their lulav and etrog and reciting Hoshanot. It is customary for the scrolls of the Torah to be removed from the synagogue's Torah ark during the procession. In a few communities, a shofar is sounded after each circuit.

== Themes ==
=== Final judgment ===
Hoshana Rabbah is known as the last of the days of judgment, which begin on Rosh Hashanah. The Zohar teaches that, while the judgment for the new year is sealed on Yom Kippur, it is not "delivered" until the end of Sukkot (i.e., Hoshana Rabbah, the last day of Sukkot), during which time Jews can still change their verdicts and decrees for the new year. The Zohar's teaching has no source in the Mishnah, Midrash, or Talmud, but a similar idea appears in the Tosefta: that all judgment is made on Rosh Hashana, but judgment of the people is sealed on Yom Kippur, while judgment for rain, grain, and fruits are sealed on the agricultural festivals of Sukkot, Passover, and Shavuot respectively.

Rabbi Mordecai Yoffe argued that Hoshana Rabbah should be observed as a day of judgment due to calendrical reasons: the Jewish year consists of 12 lunar months, totaling about 354 days in a typical year. Adding the 10 days between Rosh Hashana and Yom Kippur, there are a total of approximately 364 days between one year's Rosh Hashana and the following year's Yom Kippur, almost exactly equaling a solar year of 365 (or 366) days. Thus, on Yom Kippur, one's soul is judged for the deeds of the previous solar year. The next solar year lasts approximately from Yom Kippur to the following year's Hoshana Rabbah; thus, Hoshanah Rabbah is also a day of judgment. The third year will typically be a leap year, in which case the solar year lasts approximately from Hoshana Rabbah to Rosh Hashanah, after which the cycle repeats itself.

Consequently, an Aramaic blessing that Jews give each other on Hoshana Rabbah, "pitka tava" (פתקא טבא, 'a good note'), or, in Yiddish, "ah gut kvitl" (אַ גוט קוויטל, 'a good slip of paper'), is a wish that the verdict will be favorable.

In many Ashkenazi congregations, the hazzan (חַזָּן, 'cantor') wears a kittel on Hoshana Rabbah as on the High Holidays. Since the Hoshana Rabbah liturgy blends elements of the High Holidays, Chol HaMoed, and Jewish holidays (חַגִּים, ḥagim), in the Ashkenazi tradition, the cantor recites the service using High Holiday, festival, weekday, and Shabbat melodies as appropriate.

In some Sephardic communities, prayers known as Selichot ('forgivenesses') are recited before the regular morning service (these are the same prayers recited before Rosh Hashanah). In the different prayers of this day, Syrian Jews pray in the same maqam (melody) as on the high holidays. In Amsterdam and a few places in England, America, and elsewhere, the shofar is sounded in connection with the processions, reflecting the idea that Hoshana Rabbah is the end of the High Holy Day season. Because Hoshanah Rabbah is also linked to the High Holidays as well as being a joy-filled day, in the Jewish diaspora, some Hasidic communities (e.g., Satmar Hasidism) have the custom of having the Priestly Blessing recited during the Mussaf service. The Bobov community of Hasidic Judaism recites the Priestly Blessing only if Hoshanah Rabbah is on a Friday. However, this is uncommon outside of Israel and some Sephardic communities, where the Priestly Blessing is recited daily.

== Rituals and customs ==
The reasons for many of the customs of the day are rooted in Kabbalah.

=== Seven hoshanot ===
The modern-day observance of the rituals of Hoshana Rabbah is intended to emulate the practices that existed in the times of the Holy Temple in Jerusalem. During Sukkot, the four species are taken in a circuit (hakafah) around the bimah of the synagogue once daily. On Hoshana Rabbah, there are seven circuits (hakafot).

Making a circuit around the bimah on Sukkot while each person holds the four species in his hands has its origin in the Temple service, as recorded in the Mishnah: "It was customary to make one procession around the altar on each day of Sukkot, and seven on the seventh day" (Sukkah 4:5). The priests carried the palm branches or willows in their hands. The entire ceremony is to demonstrate rejoicing and gratitude for a blessed and fruitful year. Moreover, it serves to tear down the iron wall that separates us from our Father in Heaven, as the wall of Jericho was encompassed "and the wall fell down flat" (Joshua 6:20). Furthermore, the seven circuits correspond to the seven Hebrew words in Psalms 26:6 - "I wash my hands in purity and circle around Your altar, O Lord".

According to Kabbalistic tradition, each circuit is done in honor of a patriarch, prophet, or king. The list of honorees is identical to that of the honorary invitees to the sukkah according to the tradition of Ushpizin: Abraham, Isaac, Jacob, Moses, Aaron, Joseph, David.

=== Tikkun Hoshana Rabbah ===
Abudarham speaks of the custom of reading the Torah on the night of Hoshana Rabbah, out of which has grown the custom of reading Deuteronomy, Psalms, and passages from the Zohar; reciting Kabbalistic prayers. In Orthodox Jewish circles, some men will stay up all night learning Torah.

Sephardim have a tradition of staying up the entire night on the eve of this day. Throughout the night in the synagogues, Torah learning takes place, and some recite Selichot prayers. The entire books of Deuteronomy is read. The reason for this is because this book is considered by some as a "review" of the entire Torah, but also because in the Torah portion cycle, the book of Deuteronomy is about to be completed the following days on Simchat Torah. In addition, many read the entire book of Psalms.

It is customary to read the whole of Tehillim (Psalms) on Hoshana Rabbah eve. There is also a custom to read the book of Deuteronomy on the night of Hoshana Rabbah.

In Hasidic communities that follow the customs of Rabbi Menachem Mendel of Rimanov, there is a public reading of the Book of Devarim (Deuteronomy) from a Sefer Torah. This may be followed by a tish in honor of the festival.

The entire book of Psalms is read, with Kabbalistic prayers being recited after each of the five sections.

=== Five willow branches ===
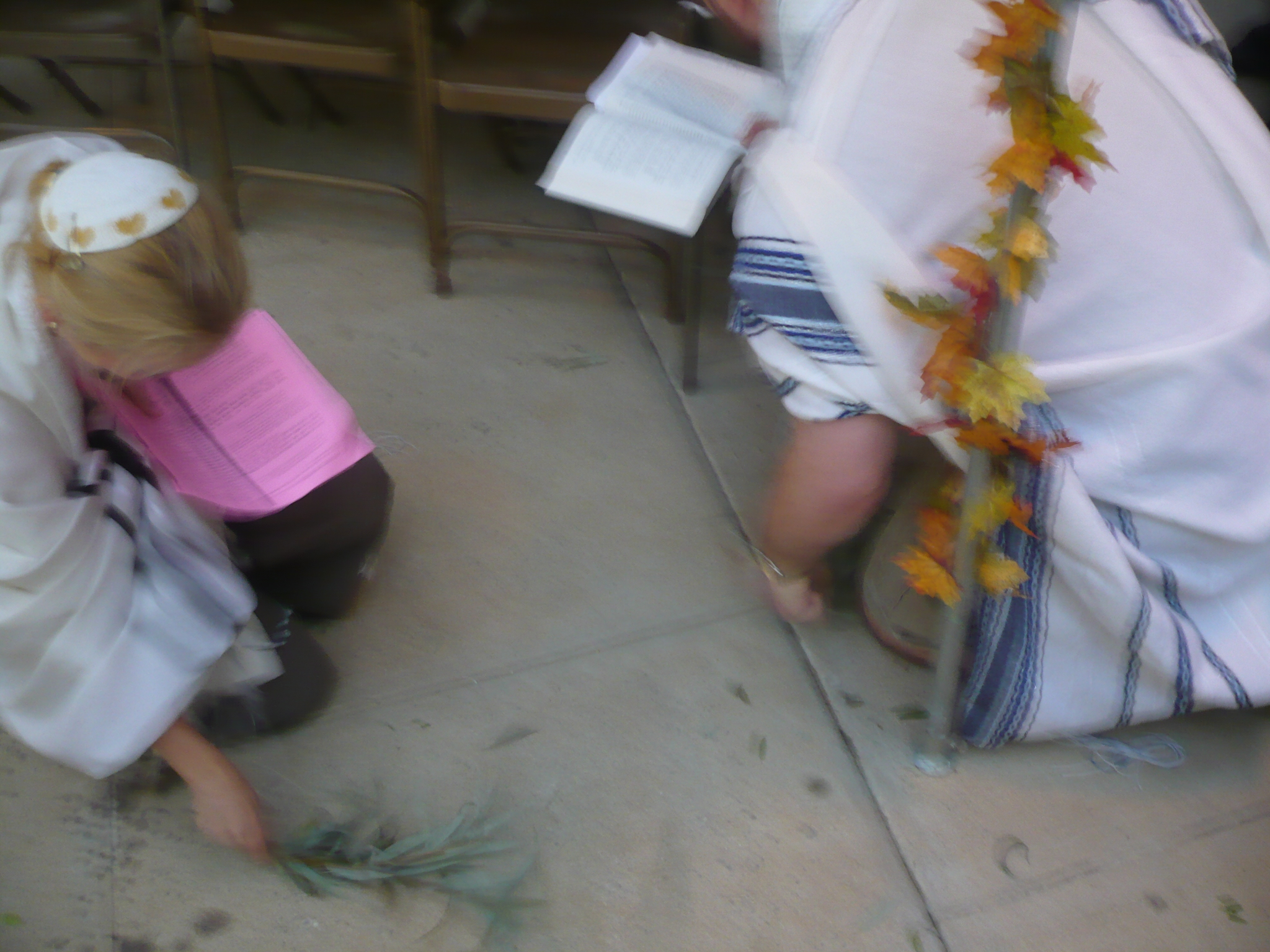
Beating of the willows at the Ziegler School of Rabbinic Studies

At the conclusion of a number of Piyyutim (liturgical poems), five willow branches are beaten on the ground or other surfaces to symbolize the elimination of sin. This is also symbolic as a prayer for rain and success in agriculture. According to the Kabbalah, beating the ground with the five willow branches is done to "Sweeten the Five Severities". There is no blessing said for this ritual, but the Aramaic expression "chabit, chabit velah barich" ("beat, beat but don't bless") is chanted because, according to tradition, this custom of beating the willow branches was started only in the times of Ezra by the three last prophets Haggai, Zechariah, and Malachi.

The Midrash notes that the Aravah (willow) represents the common folk, unlearned and lacking exceptional deeds. Rabbi Abraham Isaac Kook noted that these simple people have their own contribution to the nation; they are blessed with common sense and are unencumbered by sophisticated calculations. The unusual custom to beat the willow on the ground symbolizes that these common folk provide “a natural, healthy power that is part of the arsenal of the Jewish people. We do not strike the willow. We strike with the willow.” The Aravah represents the unlearned and not the evildoers.

=== Prayers for Messiah ===
In the Ashkenazic and Italian rites, the hoshanot are accompanied by a series of liturgical verses written by Rabbi Eleazar birabbi Qallir climaxing with, "Kol mevasser, mevasser ve-omer" (The voice of the Herald [Elijah] heralds and says)—expressing hope for the speedy coming of the Messiah.

In 2025, Hoshana Rabbah fell on the day of release of hostages after the signing of the Gaza war peace plan. Jews in Israel prayed at the site of the Nova massacre, Hostages Square, and Western Wall.

=== Traditional foods ===
In Ashkenazi culture, it is traditional to eat soup with kreplach during the meal served on the day of Hoshana Rabba.

Also in Yiddish-speaking communities, some eat boiled cabbage on Hoshanah Rabbah. This is because the Hebrew phrase "Kol Mevasser (קול מבשר)" chanted on the day, sounds, when pronounced in traditional Eastern Ashkenazi pronunciation, like "koyl mit vasser (קויל מיט וואסער)", Yiddish for "cabbage with water"(cabbage in German being kohl). Rabbi Pinchas of Koretz taught that one should bake an apple with the Hoshana branch in it to ward off toothaches in the coming year.

== See also ==
- Sukkot
- Hosanna
- Mount of Olives Hoshana Rabbah ceremony
