= Schach =

Schach may refer to:

- Schach, the German term for chess
- S'chach, material to cover huts, for the Jewish festival of Sukkot
- Elazar Shach (1899–2001), Haredi rabbi
- Gerhard Schach (1906–1972), Nazi politician
