= Sukkot =

Jewish harvest-related festival and holiday

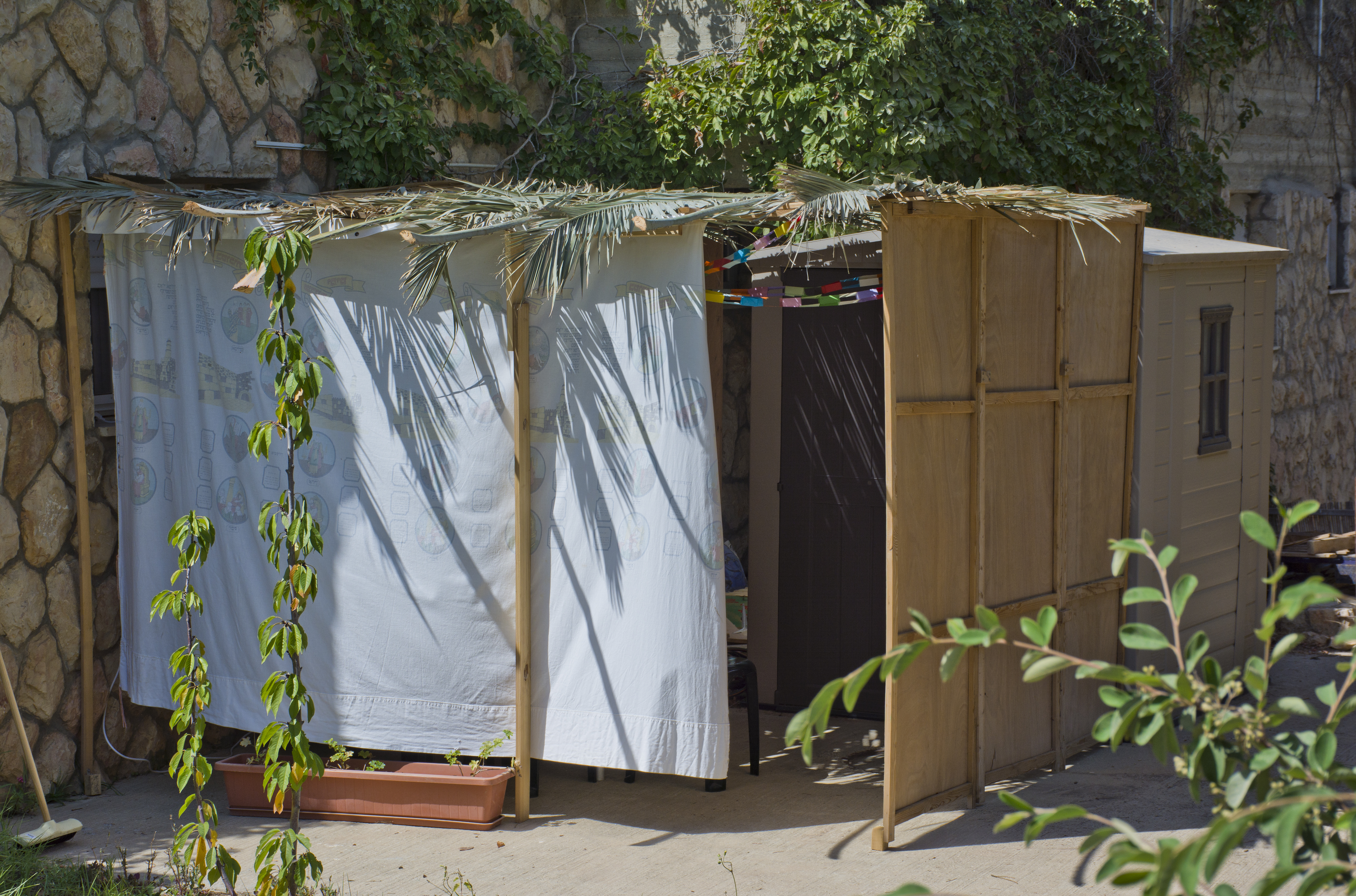
- A sukkah (plural: sukkot) in a kibbutz in Gush Etzion
- Official name: Hebrew: סוכות or סֻכּוֹת ("Booths, Tabernacles")
- Observed by: Jews; Samaritans; Semitic Neopagans
- Type: Jewish, Samaritan
- Significance: One of the three pilgrimage festivals shalosh regalim
- Observances: Dwelling and eating festive meals in a sukkah; holding and carrying the four species; doing hakafot and praising God with hallel prayers in synagogues
- Begins: 15th day of Tishrei
- Ends: 21st day of Tishrei
- Date: 15 Tishrei – 21 Tishrei
- 2025 date: Sunset, 6 October – nightfall, 13 October (14 October outside of Israel)
- 2026 date: Sunset, 25 September – nightfall, 2 October (3 October outside of Israel)
- 2027 date: Sunset, 15 October – nightfall, 22 October (23 October outside of Israel)
- 2028 date: Sunset, 4 October – nightfall, 11 October (12 October outside of Israel)
- Related to: Shemini Atzeret, Simchat Torah

Sukkot, (Note: Biblical Hebrew: חַג הַסֻּכּוֹת, romanised: Ḥag haSukkōṯ, lit. 'the pilgrimage of booths'. Also spelled Sukkoth, Succot; Ashkenazi Hebrew: Sukkōs.) also known as the Feast of Tabernacles or Feast of Booths, is a Torah-commanded Jewish holiday celebrated for seven days, beginning on the 15th day of the month of Tishrei. It is one of the Three Pilgrimage Festivals on which Israelites were commanded to make a pilgrimage to the Temple in Jerusalem. Biblically an autumn harvest festival and a commemoration of the Exodus from Egypt, Sukkot's observance is characterised by festive meals in a sukkah, a temporary wood-covered hut, and the taking of the four species.

The names used in the Torah are "Festival of Ingathering" (or "Harvest Festival", Hebrew: חַג הָאָסִיף, romanised: ḥag hāʾāsif) and "Festival of Booths" (Hebrew: חג הסכות, romanised: Ḥag hasSukkōṯ). This corresponds to the double significance of Sukkot. The one mentioned in the Book of Exodus is agricultural in nature—"Festival of Ingathering at the year's end" (Exodus 34:22)—and marks the end of the harvest time and thus of the agricultural year in the Land of Israel. The more elaborate religious significance from the Book of Leviticus is that of commemorating the Exodus and the dependence of the Israelites on the will of God (Leviticus 23:42–43).

The Hebrew word sukkoṯ is the plural of sukkah ('booth' or 'tabernacle') which is a walled structure covered with s'chach (plant material, such as overgrowth or palm leaves). A sukkah is the name of the temporary dwelling in which farmers would live during harvesting, reinforcing agricultural significance of the holiday introduced in the Book of Exodus. As stated in Leviticus, it is also reminiscent of the type of fragile dwellings in which the Israelites dwelled during their 40 years of travel in the desert after the Exodus from slavery in Egypt. Throughout the holiday, meals are eaten inside the sukkah and many people sleep there as well.

On each day of the holiday it is a mitzvah, or commandment, to 'dwell' in the sukkah and to perform a shaking ceremony with a lulav (a palm frond) bound with myrtle and willow, and an etrog (the fruit of a citron tree), collectively known as the four species. The fragile shelter, the four species, the revived Simchat Beit HaShoeivah celebration's focus on water and rainfall, and the holiday's harvest festival roots, draw attention to people's dependence on the natural environment.

In the description of the holiday by rabbinical sources, the idea of welcoming all guests and extending hospitality is intrinsic to the celebration. Actual and symbolic "guests" (Aramaic: ushpizin) are invited to participate by visiting the sukkah. Specifically, according to the Zohar, seven "forefathers" of the Jewish people are to be welcomed during the seven days of the festival, each day highlighting a different guest, usually in this order: Abraham; Isaac; Jacob; Moses; Aaron; Joseph; David.

The holiday lasts seven days. The first day (and second day in the diaspora) is a Shabbat-like holiday when work is forbidden. This is followed by intermediate days called Chol HaMoed, during which certain work is permitted. The festival is closed with another Shabbat-like holiday called Shemini Atzeret (one day in the Land of Israel, two days in the diaspora, where the second day is called Simchat Torah).

== Origins ==
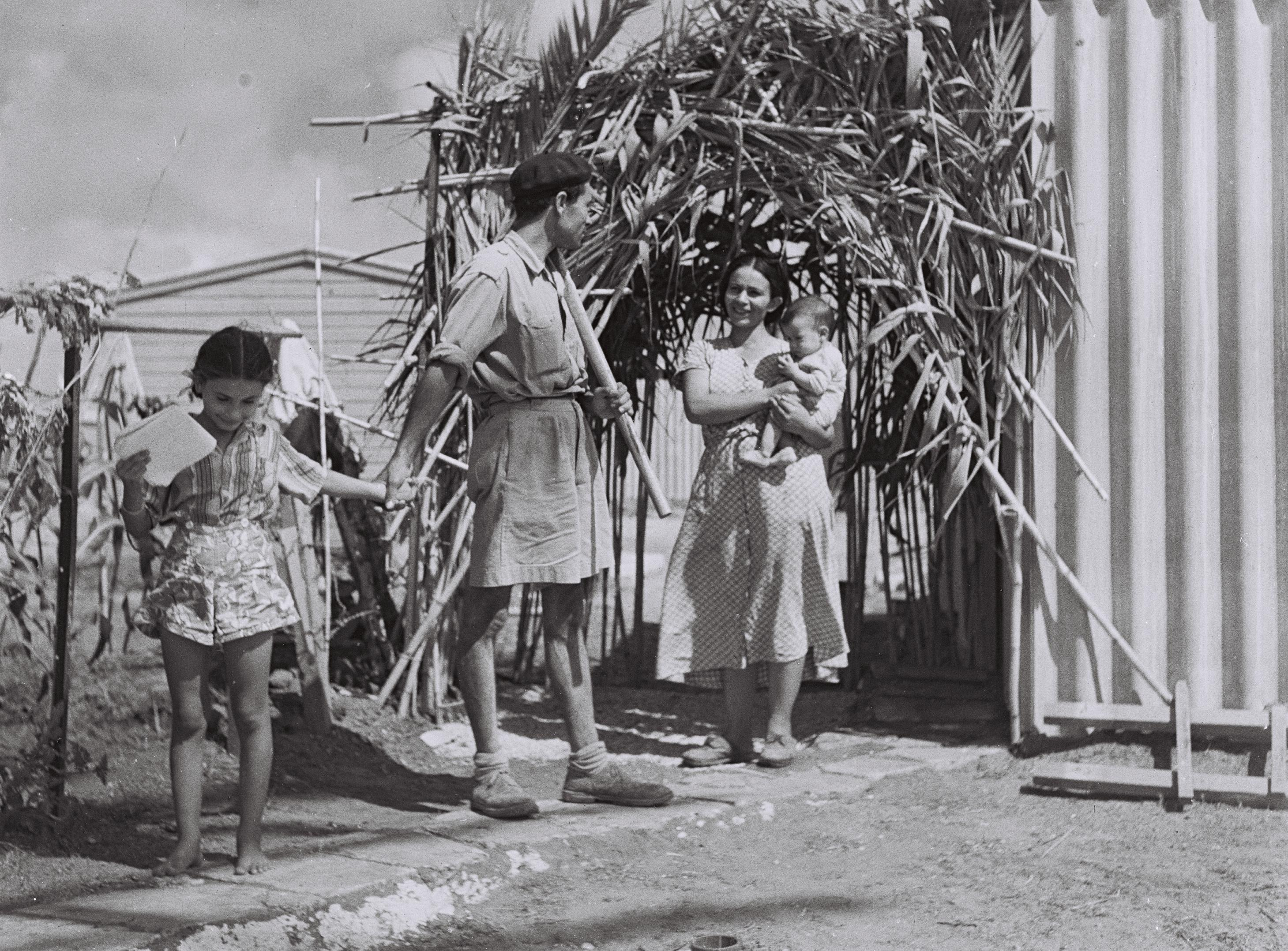
A young family standing outside the modest sukkah they built for Sukkot, where they will sleep and eat their meals throughout the holiday, Israel, 1949

The traditional origins of the holiday date back to the Israelites' time in the desert, where they were told to commemorate God's protection and the harvest season that would happen when they would arrive in the land of Israel by building huts and taking the Four Species.

Additionally, Sukkot shares similarities with older Canaanite new-year/harvest festivals, which included a seven-day celebration with sacrifices reminiscent of those in Num. 29:13–38 and "dwellings of branches", as well as processions with branches. The earliest references in the Bible (Ex. 23:16 and Ex. 34:22) make no mention of Sukkot, instead referring to it as "the festival of ingathering (hag ha'asif) at the end of the year, when you gather in the results of your work from the field," suggesting an agricultural origin. (The Hebrew term asif is also mentioned in the Gezer calendar as a two-month period in the autumn.)

The booths aspect of the festival may come from the shelters that were built in the fields by those involved in the harvesting process. Alternatively, it may come from the booths which pilgrims would stay in when they came in for the festivities at the cultic sanctuaries. Finally, Lev. 23:40 talks about the taking of various branches (and a fruit), this too is characteristic of ancient agricultural festivals, which frequently included processions with branches.

Later, the festival was historicised by symbolic connection with the desert sojourn of exodus (Lev. 23:42–43). The narratives of the exodus trek do not describe the Israelites building booths, but they indicate that most of the trek was spent encamped at oases rather than travelling, and "sukkot" roofed with palm branches were a popular and convenient form of housing at such Sinai desert oases.

== Laws and customs ==
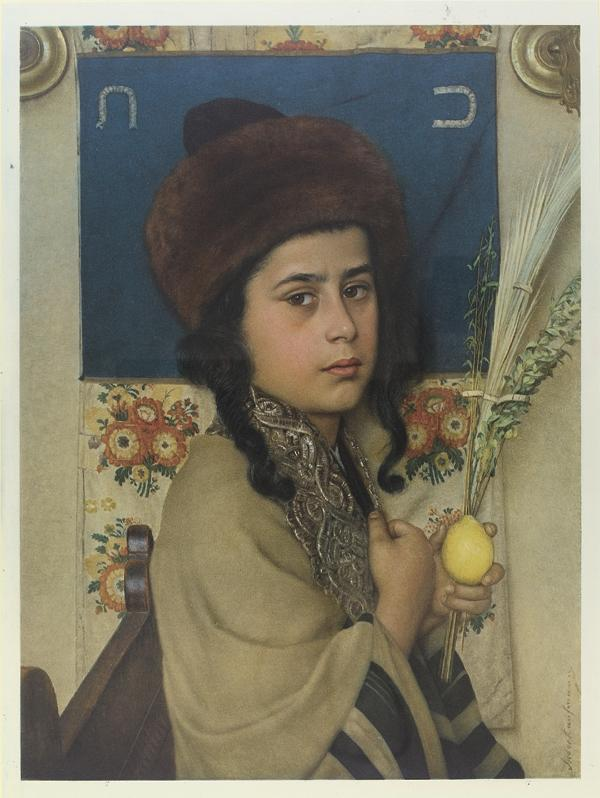
Holding the Four Species, a painting by Isidor Kaufmann, 1920

Sukkot is a seven-day festival. Inside the Land of Israel, the first day is celebrated as a full festival with special prayer services and holiday meals. Outside the Land of Israel, the first two days are celebrated as full festivals. The seventh day of Sukkot is called Hoshana Rabbah ("Great Hoshana", referring to the tradition that worshippers in the synagogue walk around the perimeter of the sanctuary during morning services) and has a special observance of its own. The intermediate days are known as Chol HaMoed ("festival weekdays"). According to Halakha, some types of work are forbidden during Chol HaMoed. In Israel many businesses are closed during this time.

Throughout the week of Sukkot, meals are eaten in the sukkah. If a brit milah (circumcision ceremony) or Bar Mitzvah rises during Sukkot, the seudat mitzvah (obligatory festive meal) is served in the sukkah. Similarly, the father of a newborn boy greets guests to his Friday-night Shalom Zachar in the sukkah. Males sleep in the sukkah, provided the weather is tolerable. If it rains, the requirement of eating and sleeping in the sukkah is waived, except for eating there on the first night where every effort needs to be made to at least say kiddush (the sanctification prayer on wine) and eat an egg-sized piece of bread before going inside the house to finish the meal if the rain does not stop. Every day except the Sabbath, a blessing is recited over the Lulav and the Etrog. Keeping of Sukkot is detailed in the Hebrew Bible (Nehemiah 8:13–18, Zechariah 14:16–19 and Leviticus 23:34–44); the Mishnah (Sukkah 1:1–5:8); the Tosefta (Sukkah 1:1–4:28); and the Jerusalem Talmud (Sukkah 1a–) and Babylonian Talmud (Sukkah 2a–56b).

=== Sukkah ===
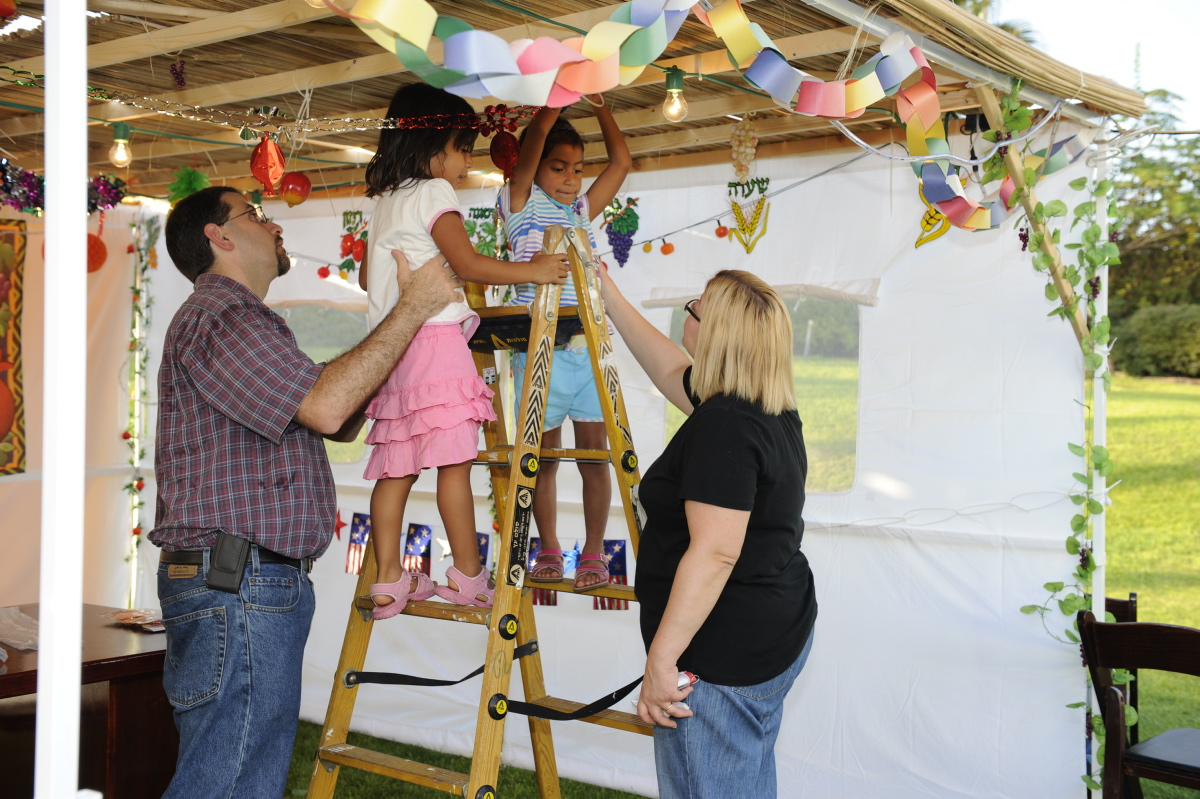
A family is hanging decorations from the s'chach (top or "ceiling") on the inside of a sukkah.

The sukkah walls can be constructed of any material that blocks wind (wood, canvas, aluminium siding, sheets). The walls can be free-standing or include the sides of a building or porch. There must be at least three walls, with one permitted to be a partial wall. The roof must be of organic material, known as s'chach, such as leafy tree overgrowth, schach mats or palm fronds – plant material that is no longer connected with the earth. It is customary to decorate the interior of the sukkah with hanging decorations of the four species as well as with attractive artwork.

=== The Four Species ===
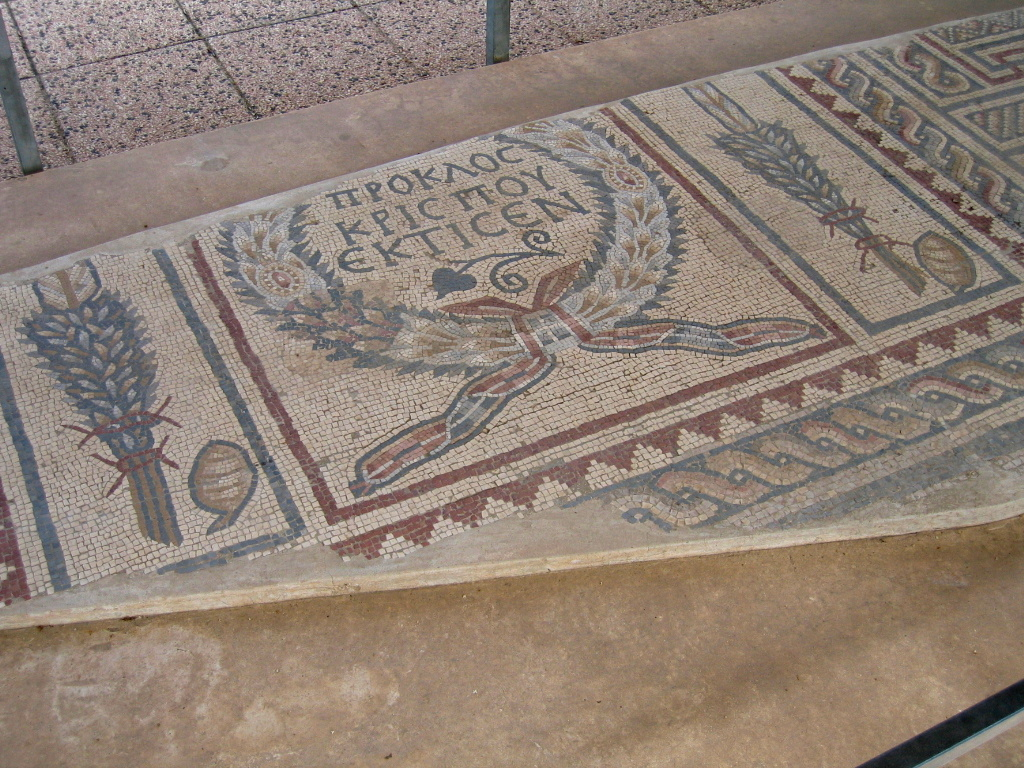
A 7th–8th century CE synagogue mosaic from Tiberias depicting a lulav and etrog alongside a Greek dedicatory inscription. Currently housed at the Eretz Israel Museum.

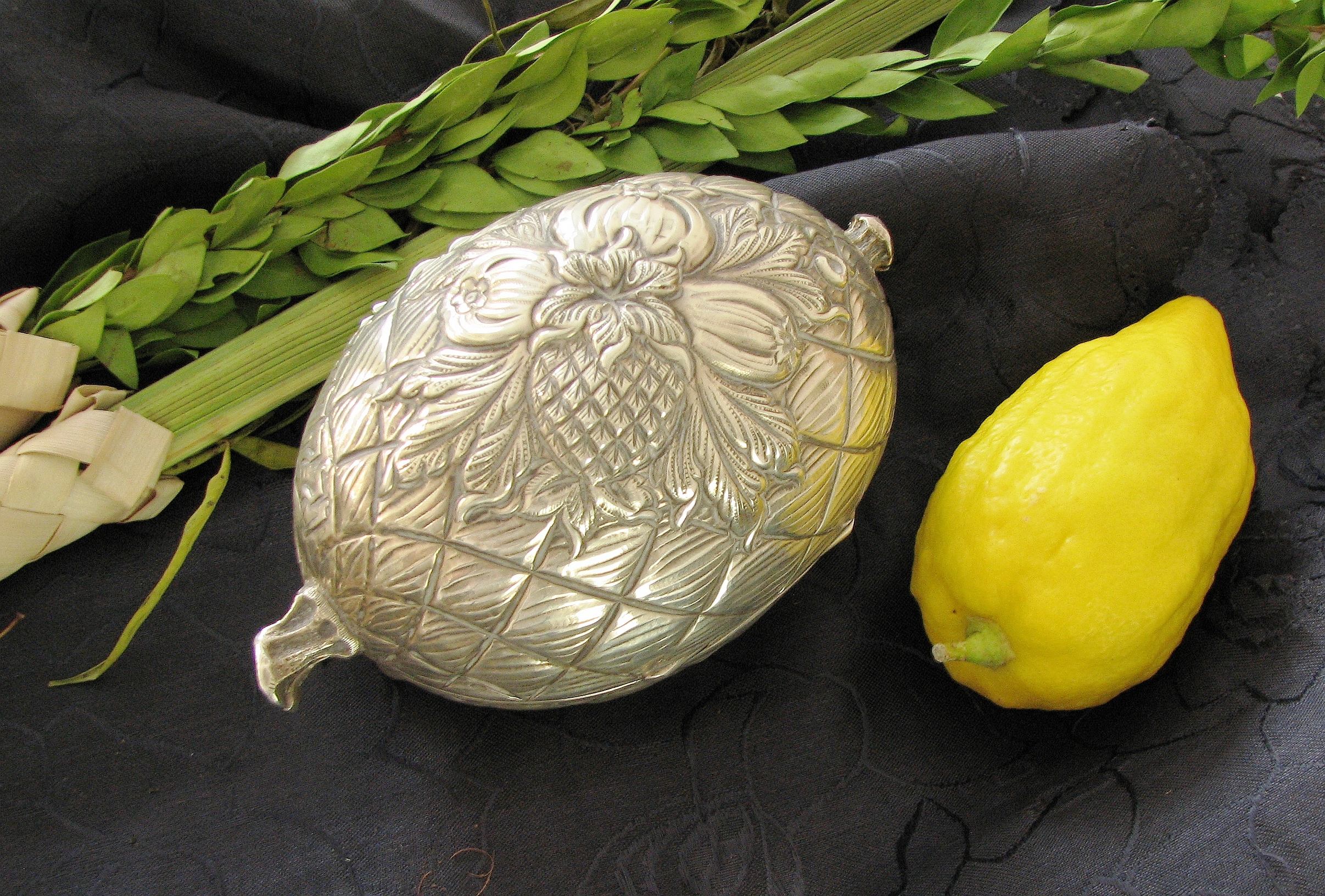
Sukkot's 4 Holy Species from left to right: Hadass (myrtle), Lulav (palm frond), Aravah (willow branch), Etrog (citron) carrier, Etrog (citron) outside its carrier

In Leviticus 23:40, the Torah says to take four species and celebrate before God for seven days. Although the Torah only describes the species but does not identify all of them, the Talmud in Tractate Sukkah derives the identity of the four species as a citron, a palm branch, two willow branches, and three myrtle branches. These are referred to in Hebrew as the lulav (palm branch) and etrog (Citron) or just lulav. The palm branch, myrtle, and willows are tied together, usually with palm leaves, and the citron is held next to the others.

These are taken all seven days of Sukkot except for Shabbat. The blessing is recited and the lulav and etrog are held together, and shaken in the four directions and up and down. They are also held during the Hallel prayer and during Hoshanot.

In 1953 the Lubavitcher Rebbe instituted the public lulav campaign to encourage observance of this mitzvah amongst all Jews, regardless of religious affiliation. It soon spread into an international phenomenon, the Jewish person holding their lulav and etrog, approaching complete strangers to offer to help them with the mitzvah becoming an iconic sight in many large cities.

=== Temple Offerings ===
Every day of Sukkot, a special regimen of animals were sacrificed in honour of the holiday as prescribed in the Torah. One of the iconic parts of these sacrifices, known as the Mussaf offerings, was the daily offering of bulls. Starting at thirteen on the first day and subtracting by one daily until reaching seven on the seventh day, the total amount of bulls offered over the holiday was 70. The symbolism was that each bull was offered in honour of one of the nations listed in Genesis Chapter 10.

=== Prayers ===
Prayers during Sukkot include the reading of the Torah every day, reciting the Mussaf (additional) service after morning prayers, reciting Hallel, and adding special additions to the Amidah and Grace after Meals. In addition, the service includes rituals involving the Four Species. The lulav and etrog are not used on the Sabbath.

On the Festival days, as well as the Sabbath of Chol Hamoed, some communities recite piyyutim.

=== Hoshanot ===
On each day of the festival, worshippers walk around the synagogue carrying the Four Species while reciting special prayers known as Hoshanot. This takes place either between Hallel and the morning's Torah reading or at the end of Mussaf. This ceremony commemorates the willow ceremony at the Temple in Jerusalem, in which willow branches were piled beside the altar with worshippers parading around the altar reciting prayers.

=== Ushpizin and ushpizata ===
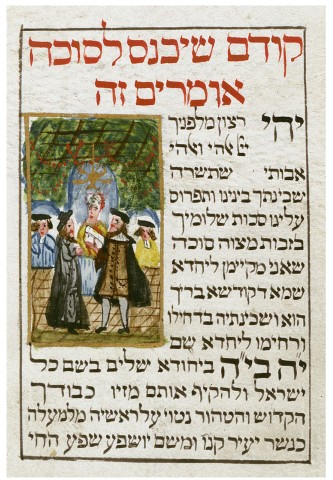
Jewish Prayer, "Yehi Ratson", to be recited before entering the sukkah, 1738

A custom originating with Lurianic Kabbalah is to recite the ushpizin prayer to "invite" one of seven "exalted guests" into the sukkah. These ushpizin (Jewish Babylonian Aramaic: אושפיזין "guests", a loanword from Middle Persian špinza "lodging"), represent the "seven shepherds of Israel": Abraham, Isaac, Jacob, Moses, Aaron, Joseph and David, each of whom correlates with one of the seven lower sefirot (this is why Joseph, associated with Yesod, follows Moses and Aaron, associated with Netzach and Hod respectively, even though he precedes them in the narrative). According to tradition, a different guest enters the sukkah each night, followed by the other six. Each ushpiz has a lesson to teach that parallels the spiritual focus of the day on which they visit based on the sefira associated with that character.

Some streams of Reconstructionist Judaism also recognise a set of seven female shepherds of Israel, called variously Ushpizot (using the Modern Hebrew feminine plural), or Ushpizātā (using the Aramaic feminine plural). Several lists of seven have been proposed. The Ushpizata are sometimes coidentified with the seven prophetesses of Judaism: Sarah, Miriam, Deborah, Hannah, Abigail, Hulda, and Esther. Some lists seek to relate each female leader to one of the sefirot to parallel their male counterparts. One such list in the order they would be invoked each evening is Ruth, Sarah, Rebecca, Miriam, Deborah, Tamar, and Rachel.

=== Chol HaMoed intermediate days ===
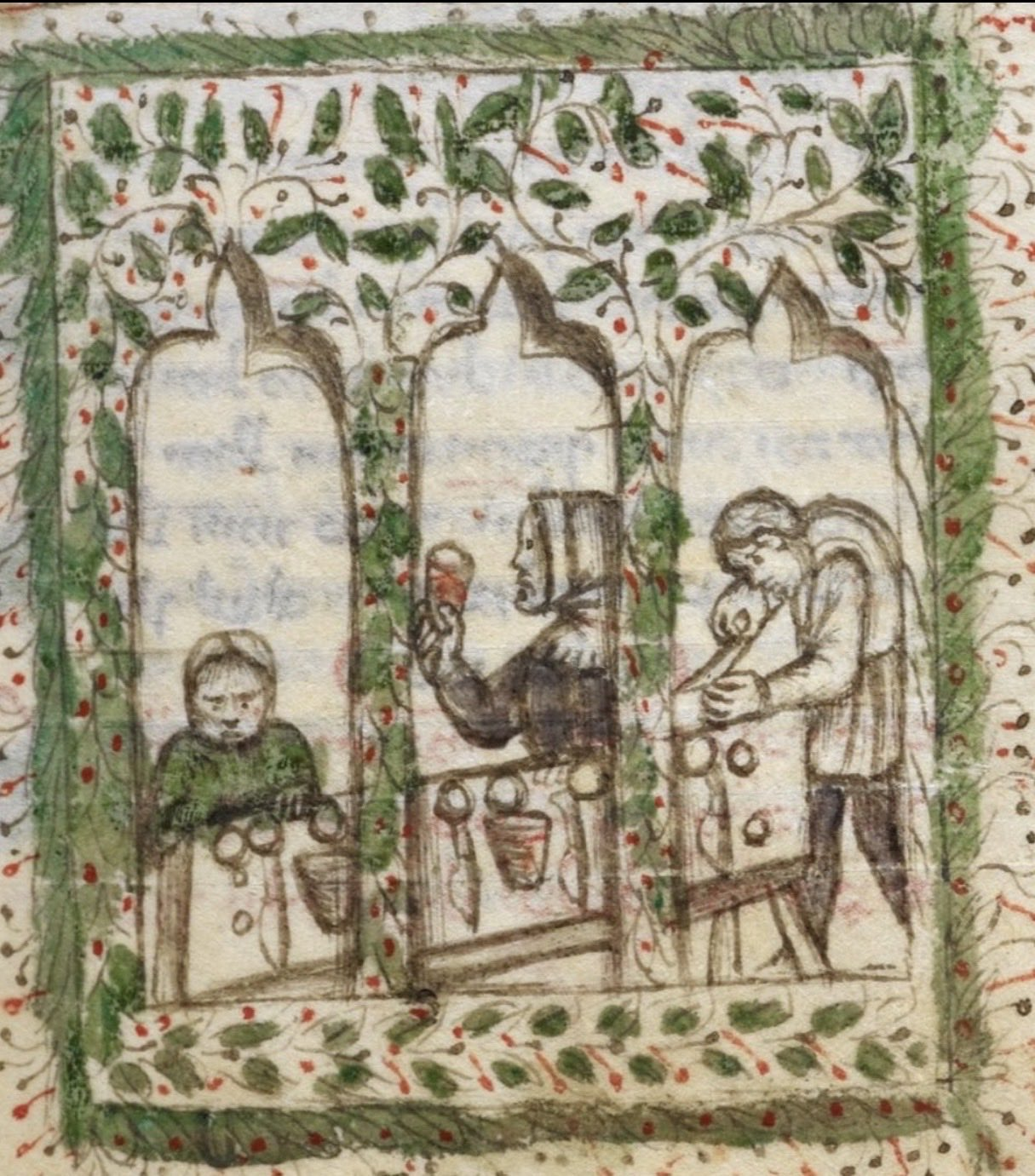
Forli Siddur, 1383

The second through seventh days of Sukkot (third through seventh days outside the Land of Israel) are called Chol HaMoed (חול המועד – lit. "festival weekdays"). These days are considered by halakha to be more than regular weekdays but less than festival days. In practice, this means that all activities that are needed for the holiday—such as buying and preparing food, cleaning the house in honour of the holiday, or travelling to visit other people's sukkot or on family outings—are permitted by Jewish law. Activities that will interfere with relaxation and enjoyment of the holiday—such as laundering, mending clothes, engaging in labour-intensive activities—are not permitted.

Religious Jews often treat Chol HaMoed as a vacation period, eating nicer than usual meals in their sukkah, entertaining guests, visiting other families in their sukkot, and taking family outings. Many synagogues and Jewish centres also offer events and meals in their sukkot during this time to foster community and goodwill.

On the Shabbat which falls during the week of Sukkot (or in the event when the first day of Sukkot is on Shabbat in the Land of Israel), the Book of Ecclesiastes is read during morning synagogue services in Ashkenazic communities. (Diaspora Ashkenazic communities read it the second Shabbat {eighth day} when the first day of sukkot is on Shabbat.) This Book's emphasis on the ephemeralness of life ("Vanity of vanities, all is vanity...") echoes the theme of the sukkah, while its emphasis on death reflects the time of year in which Sukkot occurs (the "autumn" of life). The penultimate verse reinforces the message that adherence to God and His Torah is the only worthwhile pursuit. (Cf. Ecclesiastes 12:13,14.)

=== Hakhel assembly ===
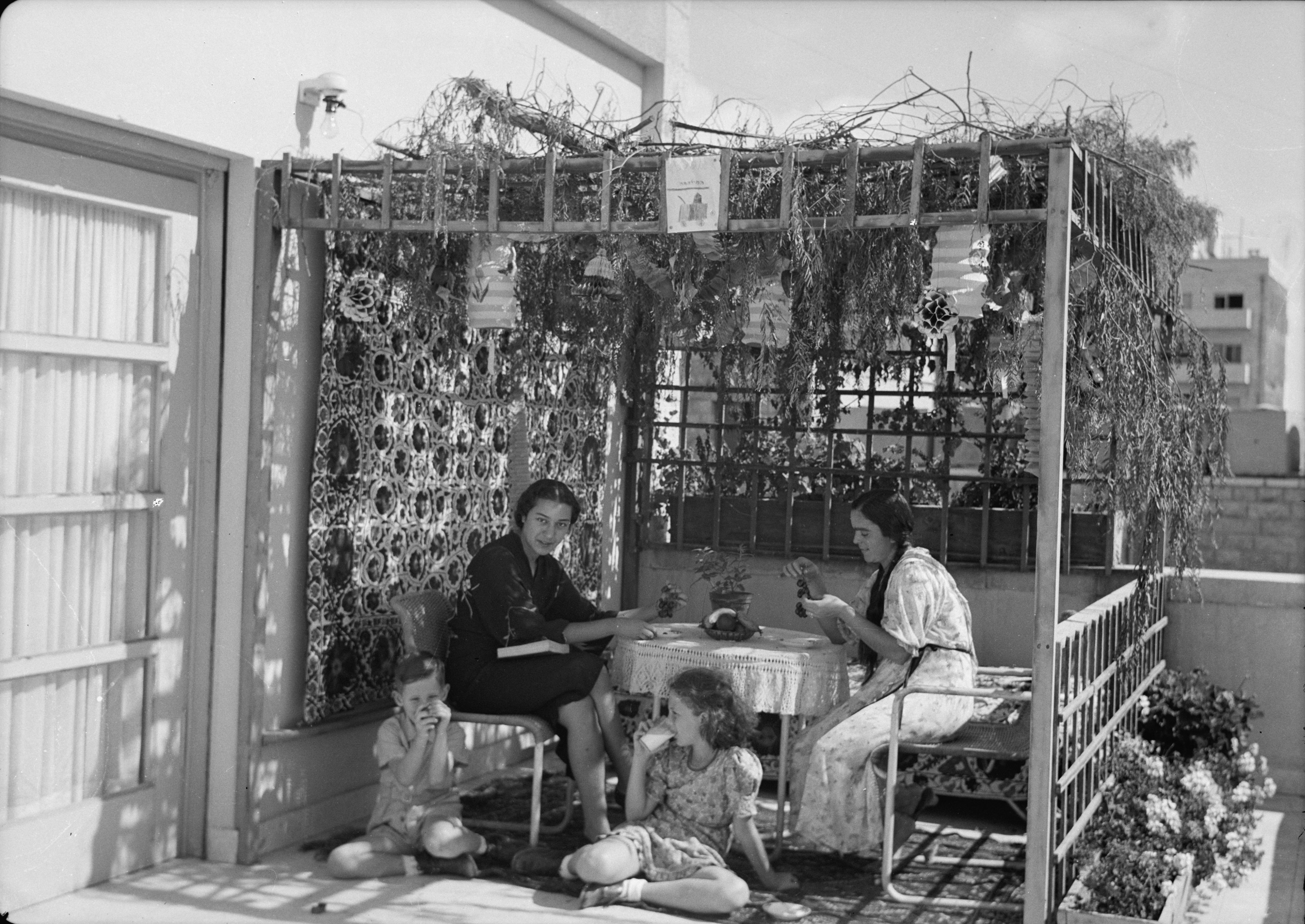
Family members sitting together in their Sukkah, Jerusalem, 1939

In the days of the Temple in Jerusalem, all Israelite, and later Jewish men, women, and children on pilgrimage to Jerusalem for the festival would gather in the Temple courtyard on the first day of Chol HaMoed Sukkot to hear the Jewish king read selections from the Torah. This ceremony, which was mandated in Deuteronomy 31:10–13, was held every seven years, in the year following the Shmita (Sabbatical) year. This ceremony was discontinued after the destruction of the Temple, but it has been revived in Israel since 1952 on a smaller scale.

=== Simchat Beit HaShoevah water-drawing celebration ===
The Simchat Beit HaShoeivah, meaning "The Celebration of the House of Drawing Water," was historically considered the most joyous event during the Second Temple period. It was such a renowned celebration that the Talmud states, "One who never saw the Water-Drawing Celebration has never seen joy in his life".

The celebration drew Jewish families, including scholars, farmers, and merchants, from distant lands such as Syria, Egypt, and Babylonia, who converged upon the Temple Mount for eight days of non-stop celebration. The festivities began on the close of the first day of Sukkot, following the afternoon offering, and lasted through the night until the morning offerings. To accommodate the crowds, Temple workers constructed large wooden bleachers on the courtyard walls, creating separation for women on the higher levels and men below. The celebration was famously lit by candelabras, whose enormous lanterns filled all of Jerusalem with light like day. The atmosphere was defined by loud music provided by Priests sounding trumpets and Levites playing instruments like lyres, flutes, and cymbals. A major spectacle involved distinguished elders, recognised by their long white beards, who sang, danced wildly, performed acrobatic feats, and juggled. The most illustrious sage, Rabban Shimon ben Gamliel, who presided over the supreme court, would famously juggle eight flaming torches.

The actual water-drawing ritual that gave the celebration its name occurred at dawn. Fresh water was drawn from the Siloam Spring, located outside Jerusalem. As the flasks of water were brought into the Temple through the Water Gate, trumpets sounded fanfare. On Sukkot, a kohen (priest) would pour a flask of this freshly drawn water onto the corner of the altar, along with the regular morning offering.

Following the Temple's destruction, Jews continued to remember the event by gathering to sing and tell stories. A powerful modern renewal began in Brooklyn, N.Y., in the fall of 1980, when the Lubavitcher Rebbe instructed that the celebration could start on the first night of Sukkot, accompanied by voices, since there was no Temple or Levite orchestra. This sparked a movement where hundreds of Jews danced and sang in the streets until dawn. The Rebbe endorsed the movement, establishing a new institution of Jewish life that continues yearly, providing a little taste of the celebration in the Temple.

=== Hoshana Rabbah (Great Supplication) ===
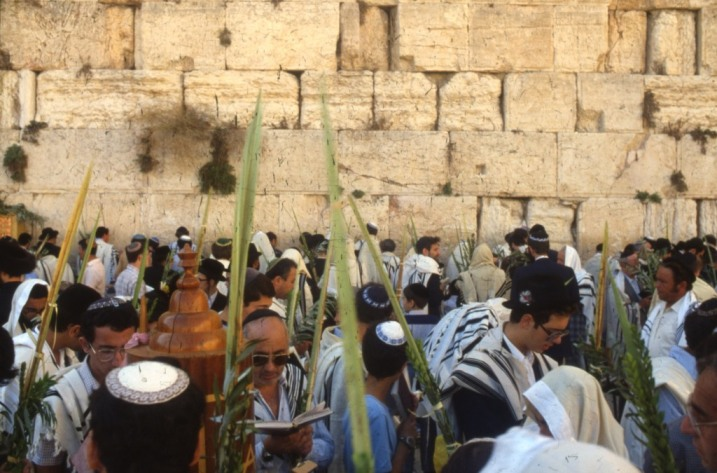
Sukkot prayers at the Western Wall (the Kotel)

The seventh day of Sukkot is known as Hoshana Rabbah (Great Supplication). This day is marked by a special synagogue service in which seven circuits are made by worshippers holding their Four Species, reciting additional prayers. In addition, a bundle of five willow branches is beaten on the ground.

=== Shemini Atzeret and Simchat Torah ===
The holiday immediately following Sukkot is known as Shemini Atzeret (lit. "Eighth [Day] of Assembly"). Shemini Atzeret is usually viewed as a separate holiday. In the diaspora a second additional holiday, Simchat Torah ("Joy of the Torah"), is celebrated. In the Land of Israel, Simchat Torah is celebrated on Shemini Atzeret. On Shemini Atzeret people leave their sukkah and eat their meals inside the house. Outside the Land of Israel, many eat in the sukkah without making the blessing. The sukkah is not used on Simchat Torah.

== Symbolism of the holiday ==
=== Protection ===
The symbolism of protection embedded in Sukkot finds its initial expression in the historical context of the Israelite exodus from Egypt, emphasising the Divine watchfulness over the Jewish people even during their lowest spiritual state. The command to reside in the temporary sukkah for seven days is intended so that future generations know that God sheltered His people when they departed Egypt.

The sukkah structure itself serves as a crucial component of the protective symbolism, particularly in relation to the harvest season. During the precarious period when the harvest is still in the field and vulnerable to natural threats like frost, flooding, and heat, the need for Divine protection is easily recognised. However, once the fruits and grain are safely brought indoors, there is a risk that the farmer will lose awareness of God's constant involvement. To counteract this shift, Jews are commanded to forsake their solid, permanent residence and reside in the temporary sukkah. Unlike a house with a solid roof, a hut with a flimsy roof, through which the wind wafts and the stars are visible, forces the resident to be fully cognisant of God's Divine protection.

=== Unity ===
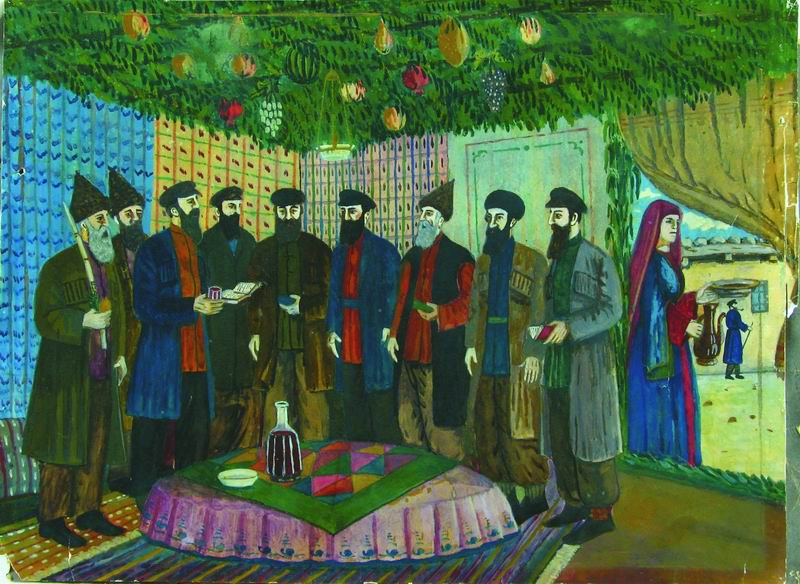
Shalom Koboshvili. Feast of Sukkot prayers. gouache on paper. 30.5×41 cm. 1938

One of the core symbolisms of the festival of Sukkot centres on Jewish unity, a theme expressed through its three major precepts: the taking of the Four Kinds, dwelling in the sukkah, and joy. Sukkot is uniquely defined in prayer as "The Time of Our Joy," emphasising a communal happiness that transcends selfish boundaries. The Torah commands one to rejoice with "your son, your daughter, your servant, your maid, the Levite, the stranger, the orphan and the widow". The joy is meant to unite all segments of society, connecting the wealthy and the pauper, or the master and the servant.

To inspire a deeper unity, the Jew acquires the Four Kinds, which symbolise four different spiritual classes within the community based on knowledge (taste) and good deeds (scent): the etrog (taste and scent), the lulav (taste but no scent), the hadas (scent but no taste), and the aravah (no taste and no scent). When these Four Kinds are bound together, they reiterate the underlying oneness of a diverse people, integrating the scholarly and the ignorant into a single entity, thereby moving unity beyond mere connection to integration.

A yet higher form of unity is embodied by the sukkah itself. The Talmud states that "The entire nation of Israel may, and ought to, dwell in a single sukkah," because the structure represents a oneness so deep that all distinctions pale into insignificance. The sukkah encompasses the entirety of a person, from their mind to their "muddy boots," equally. When the whole nation dwells in a single sukkah, the unity expressed transcends individual differences and is deeper than the compassionate unity of joy or the complementary integration of the Four Kinds.

== Sukkot in the generations of Israel ==
=== Jeroboam's feast ===
According to 1 Kings 12:32–33, King Jeroboam, first king of the rebellious northern kingdom, instituted a feast on the fifteenth day of the eighth month in imitation of the feast of Sukkot in Judah, and pilgrims went to Bethel instead of Jerusalem to make thanksgiving offerings. Jeroboam feared that continued pilgrimages from the northern kingdom to Jerusalem could lead to pressure for reunion with Judah:

If these people go up to offer sacrifices in the house of the Lord at Jerusalem, then the heart of this people will turn back to their lord, Rehoboam king of Judah, and they will kill me and go back to Rehoboam king of Judah.

— 1 Kings 12:27

== In Christianity ==
Sukkot is celebrated by a number of Christian denominations that observe holidays from the Old Testament. These groups base this on the belief that Jesus celebrated Sukkot (see the Gospel of John 7). The holiday is celebrated according to its Hebrew calendar dates. The first mention of observing the holiday by Christian groups dates to the 17th century, among the sect of the Subbotniks in Russia.

== Academic views ==
De Moor has suggested that there are links between Sukkot and the Ugaritic New Year festival, in particular the Ugaritic custom of erecting two rows of huts built of branches on the temple roof as temporary dwelling houses for their gods.

Some have pointed out that the original Thanksgiving holiday had many similarities with Sukkot in the Bible.

== See also ==
- Brush arbour revival
- Feast of Wine – Jewish festival in the Qumran Temple Scroll
- List of harvest festivals
- Palm Sunday – Christian moveable feast preceding Easter
- Shkinta – Celestial dwelling or ritual hut in Mandaeism
- Sukkah City – A 2010 public art and architecture competition planned for New York City's Union Square Park
- Ushpizin
