= Four species =

Plant species used ceremonially during the Jewish holiday of Sukkot

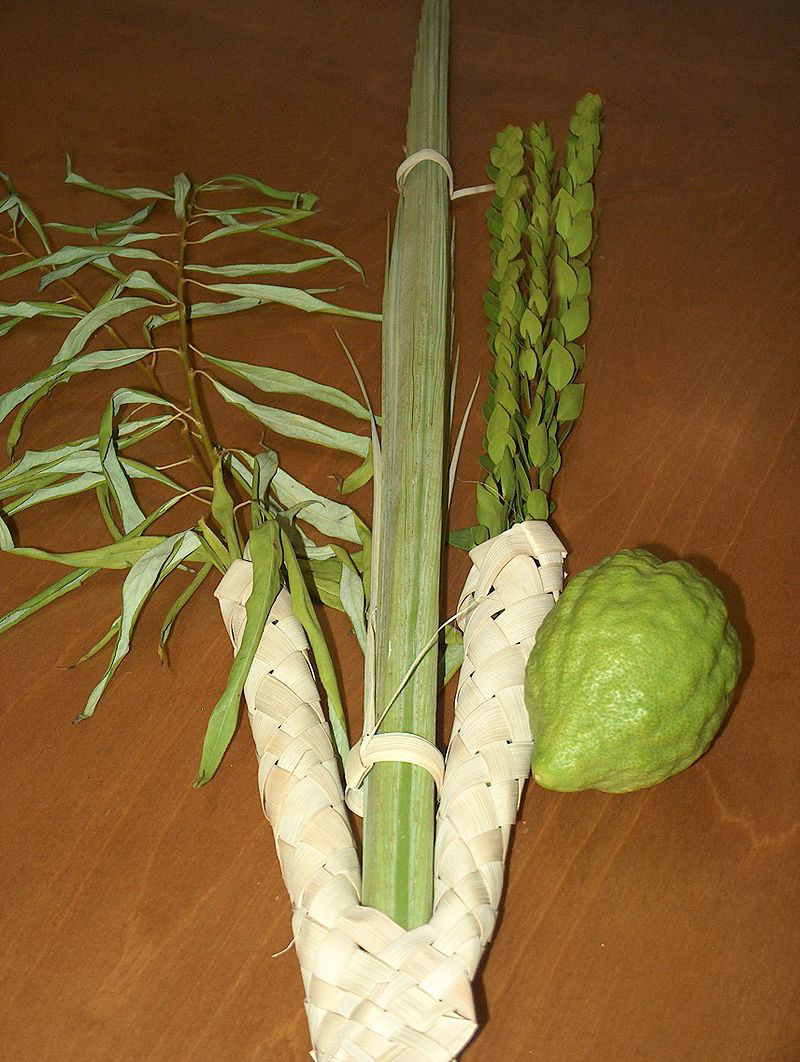
- The four species. From left to right: aravah, lulav, hadass, etrog

Halakhic texts relating to this article
- Torah: Leviticus 23:40
- Babylonian Talmud: Sukkah Chapter 3
- Mishneh Torah: Laws of Shofar, Sukkah, and Lulav 7:1–8:11
- Shulchan Aruch: Orach Chaim 645–658

The four species (Hebrew: ארבעת המינים arba'at ha-minim, also called arba'a minim) are four plants—the etrog, lulav, hadass, and aravah—mentioned in the Torah (Leviticus 23:40) as being relevant to the Jewish holiday of Sukkot. Observant Jews tie together three types of branches and one type of fruit and wave them in a special ceremony each day of the Sukkot holiday, excluding Shabbat. The waving of the four plants is a mitzvah prescribed by God in the Torah, and it contains symbolic allusions to a Jew's service of God.

== The four plants ==
The mitzvah of waving the four species derives from the Torah. Leviticus 23:40 states:

And you shall take on the first day the fruit of splendid trees, branches of palm trees and boughs of leafy trees and willows of the brook, and you shall rejoice before the LORD your God for seven days. English Standard Version

The Hebrew terms in this verse are:

- pərī 'ēṣ hāḏār (פְּרִי עֵץ הָדָר), fruit of a beautiful tree
- kappōt təmārīm (כַּפֹּת תְּמָרִים), palm fronds
- 'ănaf 'ēṣ-'āḇōṯ (עֲנַף עֵץ־עָבֹת), a bough of thick/leafy trees
- 'arḇē-nāḥal (עַרְבֵי־נָחַל), willows of the brook/valley

In Talmudic tradition, the four plants are identified as:

- etrog (אתרוג) – the fruit of a citron tree
- lulav (לולב) – a ripe, green, closed frond from a date palm tree
- hadass (הדס) – boughs with leaves from the myrtle tree
- aravah (ערבה) – branches with leaves from the willow tree

== Practice ==
=== Preparation ===
To prepare the species for the mitzvah, the lulav is first bound together with the hadass and aravah (this bundle is also referred to as "the lulav") in the following manner: One lulav is placed in the center, two aravah branches are placed to the left, and three hadass boughs are placed to the right. (This order is the same for both right-handed and left-handed people.) The bundle may be bound with strips from another palm frond, or be placed in a special holder which is also woven from palm fronds.

Sephardic Jews place one aravah to the right of the lulav and the second aravah to its left, and cover them with the three hadass boughs—one on the right, the second on the left, and the third atop the lulav's spine, leaning slightly to the right. The bundle is held together with rings made from strips of palm fronds. Many Hasidic Ashkenazi Jews follow this practice as well.

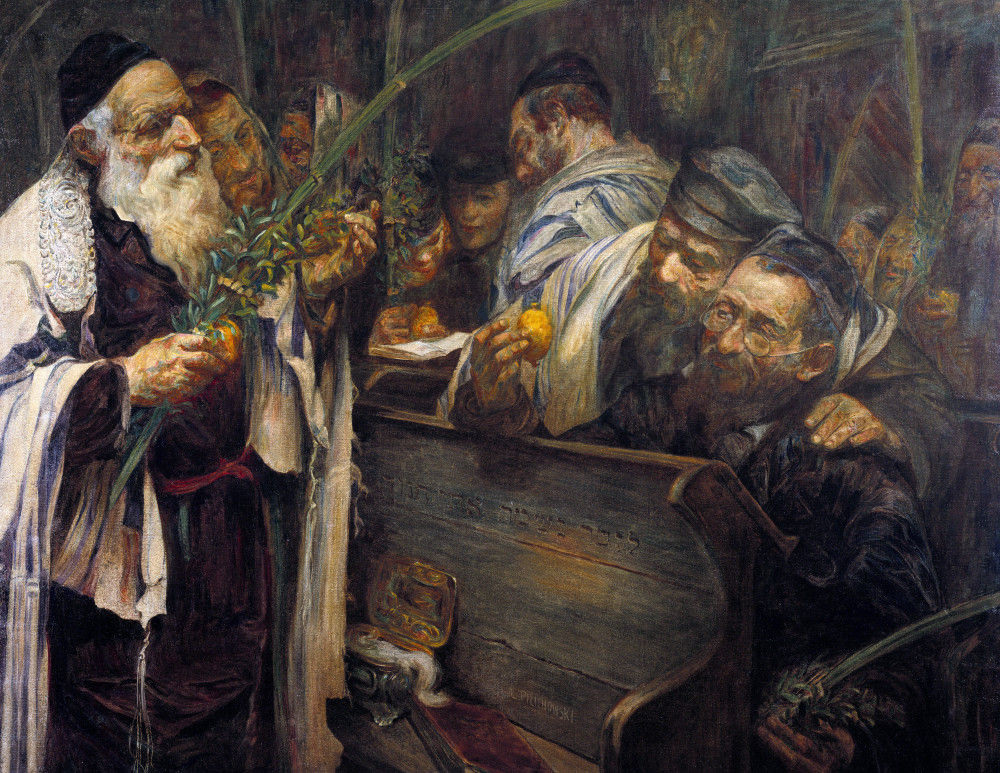
Sukkot in the Synagogue (painting circa 1894–1895 by Leopold Pilichowski)

In all cases, all of the species must be placed in the direction in which they grew. (For the etrog, this means that the stem end should be on the bottom and the blossom end on top; this is the direction in which the etrog begins to grow, though as it matures on the tree it usually hangs in the opposite direction.)

=== Waving ===
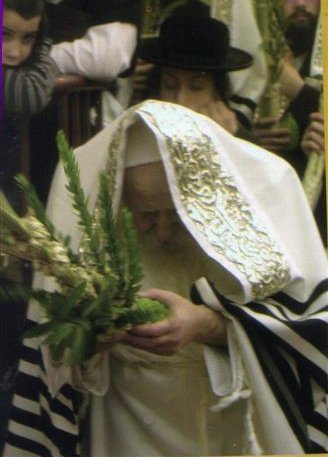
The Tosher Rebbe of Montreal, Quebec, Canada, waving the four species during Hallel

To recite the blessing over the lulav and etrog, the lulav is held in one hand and the etrog in the other. Right-handed users hold the lulav in the right hand and the etrog in the left. The customs for those who are left-handed differ for Ashkenazim and Sephardim. According to the Ashkenazi custom, the lulav is held in the left hand, and according to the Sephardi custom, in the right hand.

According to Sephardi and Chabad custom, the blessing is said while holding only the lulav and the etrog is picked up once the blessing is completed. According to Ashkenazi custom, before the blessing is said, the etrog is turned upside-down, opposite the direction in which it grows. The reason for these two customs is that the blessing must precede the performance of the mitzvah. Should all the species be held in the direction in which they grew, the mitzvah would be fulfilled before the blessing is recited.

After reciting the blessing, "Blessed are You, Lord our God, King of the universe, Who has sanctified us with His commandments, and commanded us to take the lulav" (the "Shehecheyanu" blessing is also recited the first time each year that one waves the lulav and etrog), the etrog is turned right side up (or picked up), and the user brings their two hands together so that the etrog touches the lulav bundle. The four species are then pointed and gently shaken three times toward each of the four directions, plus up and down, to attest to God's mastery over all of creation. This shaking or waving is called na'anu'im (נענועים).

The waving ceremony can be performed in the synagogue, or in the privacy of one's home or sukkah, as long as it is daytime. Women and girls may choose to perform the mitzvah of waving the lulav and etrog, but are not required by Halakha to do so. Because women are not required to perform this mitzva, some are of the opinion that Sephardi women do not recite the blessing.

=== In synagogue ===
The waving is performed again (though without the attendant blessings) during morning prayer services in the synagogue, at several points during the recital of Hallel.

Additionally, in the synagogue, Hallel is followed by a further ceremony, in which the worshippers join in a processional around the sanctuary with their four species, while reciting special supplications (called hoshaanot, from the refrain hosha na, "save us"). From the first through the sixth day of Sukkot, one complete circuit is made; on Hoshanah Rabbah, the seventh and last day of Sukkot, seven complete circuits are made. As the four species are not used on Shabbat, there are variant customs as to whether hoshaanot are said and a circuit made on that day.

=== Lulav campaign ===
The Lulav and Etrog Campaign, which became one of the inaugural efforts in Chabad's broad Mitzvah Campaigns, began in September 1953, under the direction of the Rabbi Menachem Schneerson. The initiative was part of the Rabbi Schneerson's overarching vision to reconnect every Jew with their Jewish soul. The campaign was formally launched when the Rebbe's chief secretary, Rabbi Chaim Mordechai Aizik Hodakov, summoned two Yeshiva students, with a directive to go out onto the streets during the holiday of Sukkot. The idea was simple: to take the Four Kinds, and offer Jews they encountered the opportunity to fulfill this central Sukkot Mitzvah. Although Chabad had a long history of concern for fellow Jews and had established systems like the Jewish day school network and the Released Time program, going out into the streets and approaching strangers in this manner was a new type of outreach for both the Chabad students and the American Jews they encountered. The initial outreach, which Rabbi Yehuda Krinsky recalled as a "very quiet affair, person to person," saw 70 young men participating and visiting locations like Crown Heights, Brownsville, East New York, and the Bronx.

The immediate results of this inaugural effort were chronicled in a report by Rabbi Berel Shemtov, documenting that approximately "1,500 fellow Jews fulfilled the mitzvah" during the first two days of Sukkot. The responses from non-observant Jews were highly emotional at times, with some performing the mitzvah with tears in their eyes, acknowledging that it had been years since they had fulfilled it. However, the campaign also received negative feedback, including comments such as "Mind your own business". The underlying philosophy of the Mitzvah Campaigns is the belief that engaging Jews with the physical action of a mitzvah is the core way to connect them to Judaism. Later observations reinforced the striking effects of this tangible approach, particularly when Chassidim visited nursing homes; doctors and nurses were astonished to see previously silent and depressed individuals suddenly display lively interest, eagerly grasping the lulav and etrog, and sometimes reciting the blessings from memory, demonstrating that the objects unlocked powerful, joyful recollections of their heritage.

== History ==
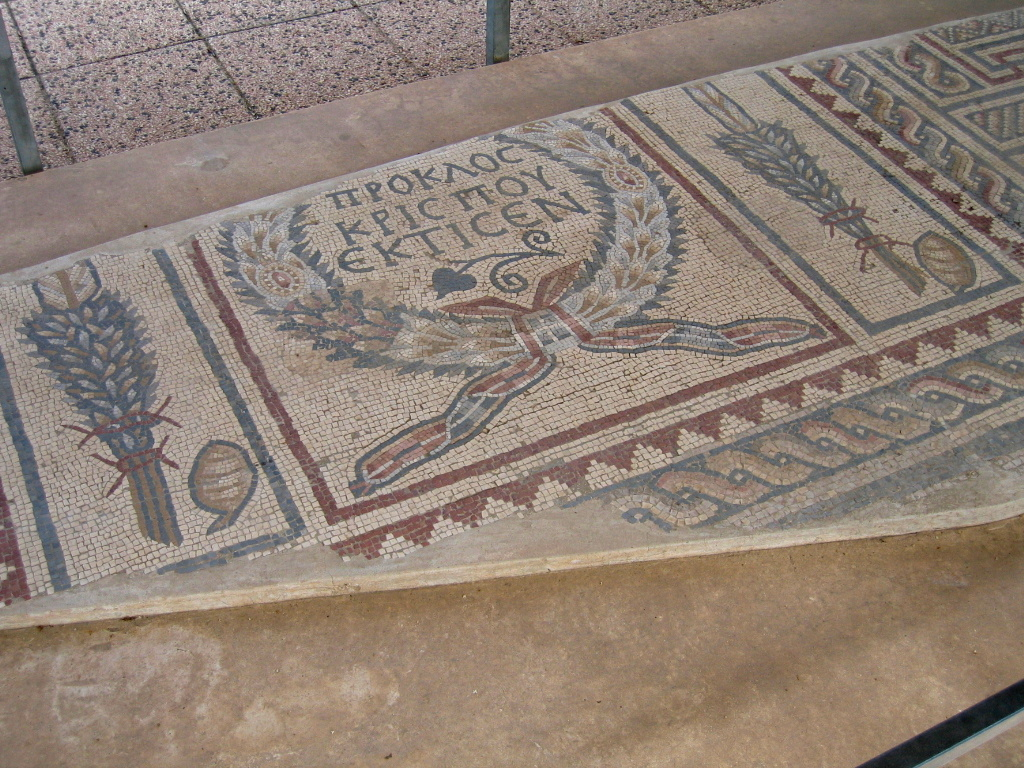
A 7th–8th century CE synagogue mosaic from Tiberias depicting a lulav and etrog alongside a Greek dedicatory inscription. Currently housed at the Eretz Israel Museum.

During the time of the Temple in Jerusalem, the species were taken in the Temple on all seven days of Sukkot, and elsewhere only on the first day. This followed the command of Leviticus 23:40, which calls for the species to be "taken" on the first day, followed by seven days of celebration "before God" (at the Temple). Following the destruction of the Temple, Rabbi Yohanan ben Zakkai ordered that the four species be waved everywhere on every day of Sukkot (except on Shabbat), as a memorial to the Temple.

The practice of waving the four species has been understood in different ways. Apparently, initially the waving was a part of the vigorous dancing (or shaking of musical instruments) which took place as part of the Temple celebrations on Sukkot. After the destruction of the Temple, the waving acquired a symbolic meaning, with six directions of waving symbolizing God's control over every direction of the universe, similar to certain Temple offerings which were also waved in six directions.

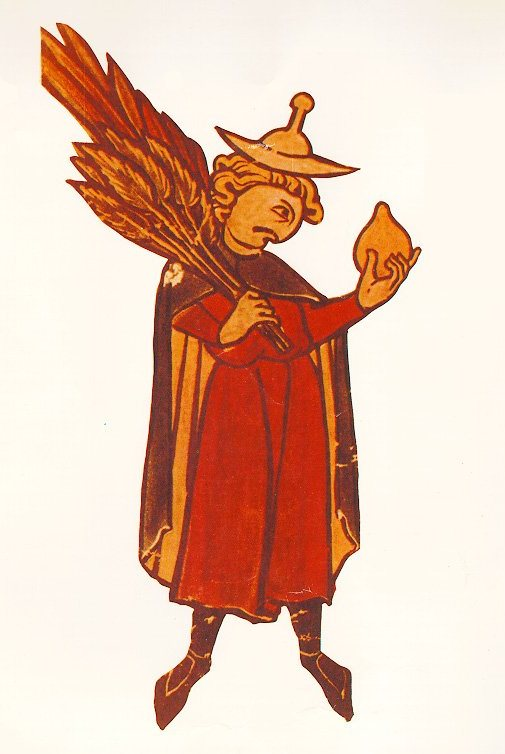
A Jew with the four species, depicted in a medieval Hebrew calendar

In old Jewish Eastern European communities, the Jews lived in cities far from fields, which then required substantial travel in order to purchase the four species. Often whole towns would have had to share them. The etrog especially was rare and thus very expensive.

Northern African communities—such as those in Morocco and Tunis—were located closer to fields where etrogim could be grown, but the etrog was still fairly expensive. There, instead of one per city, there was one per family. Still, the community would share their etrogim to some extent.

Today, with improved transportation, farming techniques etc., more people have their own. An etrog can cost anywhere from $3 to $500 depending on its quality.

== Selecting the four species ==
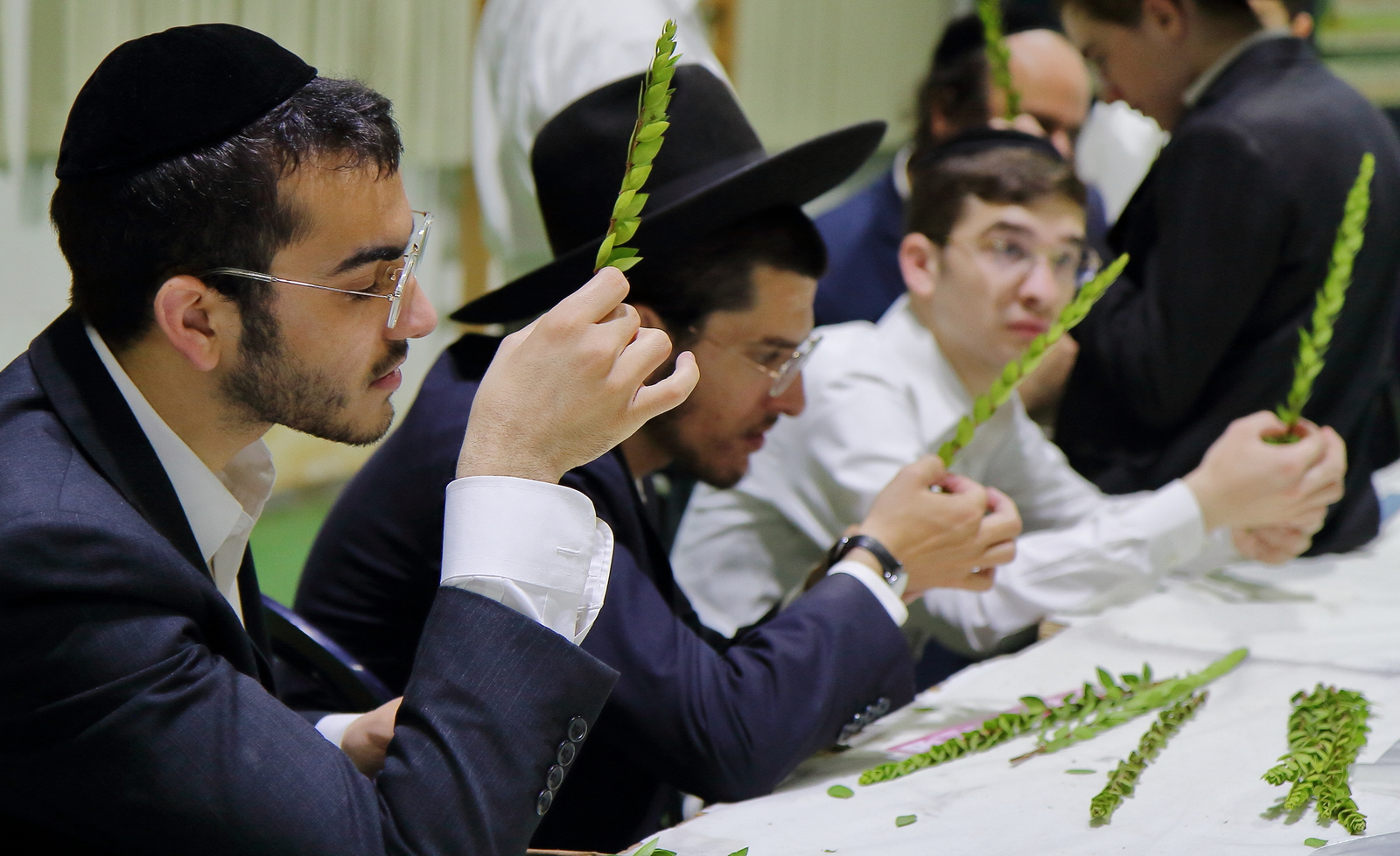
The four-species market in Bnei Brak, Israel, 2021

While all mitzvot should be performed in the best manner possible, hiddur mitzvah (beautifying the mitzvah) especially applies to the four species. The halacha is explicit on what constitutes the "best" in each species. To that end, people will spend large amounts of money to acquire the most perfect etrog, the straightest lulav, and the freshest hadass and aravah. Usually a father will buy several sets of the four species to outfit his sons as well.

Hiddur mitzvah applies to all mitzvot, but its absence does not impede the mitzvah from being performed. For the four species specifically, there is a further "technical" requirement of hadar (beauty), which does impede the mitzvah of the four species from being performed. Despite their similar names and details, these two requirements are distinct from one another.

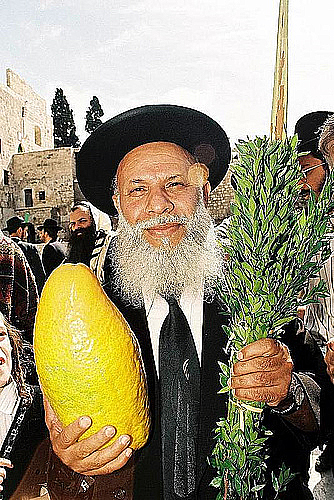
Jewish Yemenite man with a lulav and large etrog, Jerusalem (2009)

== Interpretations ==
Several explanations are offered as to why these particular species were chosen for the mitzvah.

The four species are distinctive in that none of them are widespread in the Land of Israel, but rather occur in distinct parts of the land: etrog in the moist coastal plain, lulav near springs in the valleys, hadas in the mountains, and aravah near major wadis and rivers. Thus, in order to perform the commandment, Jews from different parts of the land had to gather together at the Temple to share the species that grew in their locations.

After the exile made such a gathering impossible, the rabbis adapted the idea, teaching that the binding of the four species symbolizes the unification of four categories of Jews in service of God, as follows:

- The lulav has taste but no smell, symbolizing those who study Torah but do not possess good deeds.
- The hadass has a good smell but no taste, symbolizing those who possess good deeds but do not study Torah.
- The aravah has neither taste nor smell, symbolizing those who lack both Torah and good deeds.
- The etrog has both a good taste and a good smell, symbolizing those who have both Torah and good deeds.

A second explanation finds the four species alluding to parts of the human body. Each of the species or its leaves is similar in shape to the following organs:

- Lulav – the spine
- Hadass – the eye
- Aravah – the mouth
- Etrog – the heart

By binding them together for a mitzvah, Jews show their desire to consecrate their entire being to the service of God.

An additional reason for waving the four species in all directions alludes to the fact that all these species require much water to grow. The lulav grows in watered valleys, hadass and aravah grow near water sources, and the etrog requires more water than other fruit trees. By taking these particular species and waving them in all directions, the Jew symbolically voices a prayer for abundant rainfall for all the vegetation of the earth in the coming year.

== Karaite interpretation ==
According to Karaite Judaism, the purpose of the command to collect the four species in Lev. 23:40 is ambiguous, as the text does not explicitly state what to do with them. Karaite Jews believe the intent is not to wave the four species but rather to use them to build the "sukkah" which is described in neighboring verses (23:42–43). This interpretation is based in part on Nehemiah 8:14–18:

And they found written in the Law, how that the LORD had commanded by Moses, that the children of Israel should dwell in booths in the feast of the seventh month; and that they should publish and proclaim in all their cities, and in Jerusalem, saying: 'Go forth unto the mount, and fetch olive branches, and branches of wild olive, and myrtle branches, and palm branches, and branches of thick trees, to make booths, as it is written.' So the people went forth, and brought them, and made themselves booths...

The passage states that it is "written in the Law" for people to go to the mountains to get palm branches, olive leaves, pine needles, myrtle leaves, and other forms of vegetation with which to build the sukkot. The only verse in the Torah that mentions some of these species is Lev. 23:40. According to most Karaites, this indicates that Ezra's scribes interpreted that verse as referring to building materials for the sukkah, not waving the four species.

Lawrence Schiffman interprets the passage the same way:

One of the earliest examples of midrashic exegesis was the manner in which Lev. 23:40–42 was interpreted by the book of Ezra. The interpretation proposed here was rejected by Jewish tradition, which saw Lev. 23:40 as referring to the taking of the lulav and etrog, not to the building of the sukkah.

Schiffman believes the passage in Nehemiah is a midrashic interpretation of Lev. 23:40, as do the Karaites. However, his view is that this interpretation was eventually rejected by "Jewish tradition," i.e., majority practice, in favor of the Talmudic interpretation of Lev. 23:40 as referring to waving the four species. In contrast to Schiffman, some commentators argue that the verse in Nehemiah cannot be referring to Lev. 23:40, since the language in Nehemiah has some differences from that verse. The peri ʿeṣ hadar (fruit of a beautiful tree) and the willow branches are omitted, and two species of olive branches are added. It remains unclear according to this interpretation where exactly the scribes in Nehemiah's day "found written in the law" that the Sukkah should be taken from the described species, as no such commandment appears in the books of Moses or anywhere else in the Hebrew Bible.

A minority view exists among the Karaites sages which holds that the four species symbolize a wide variety of greeneries and fruits that are meant to be decoratively bundled together, carried around, and eaten throughout this holiday, thus fulfilling the injunction of Lev 23:40 "to rejoice before the Lord".

== Art ==
The Four Species have been depicted in Jewish art since ancient times. These elements surfaced on coins during the First Jewish Revolt (AD 66–70) and the Bar Kochba rebellion (AD 132–136). The Four Species resurfaced in the visual arts of late antiquity, appearing in artistic objects found both in the Land of Israel and diaspora communities.

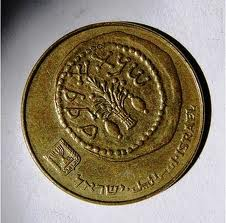
Lulav and etrog on coin

== See also ==
- Five species of grain
- Seven Species

== Bibliography ==
- Kitov, Eliyahu (1978). The Book of Our Heritage. Jerusalem: Feldheim Publishers. ISBN 0-87306-152-7.
