= Aravah (Sukkot) =

Leafy branch of the willow tree

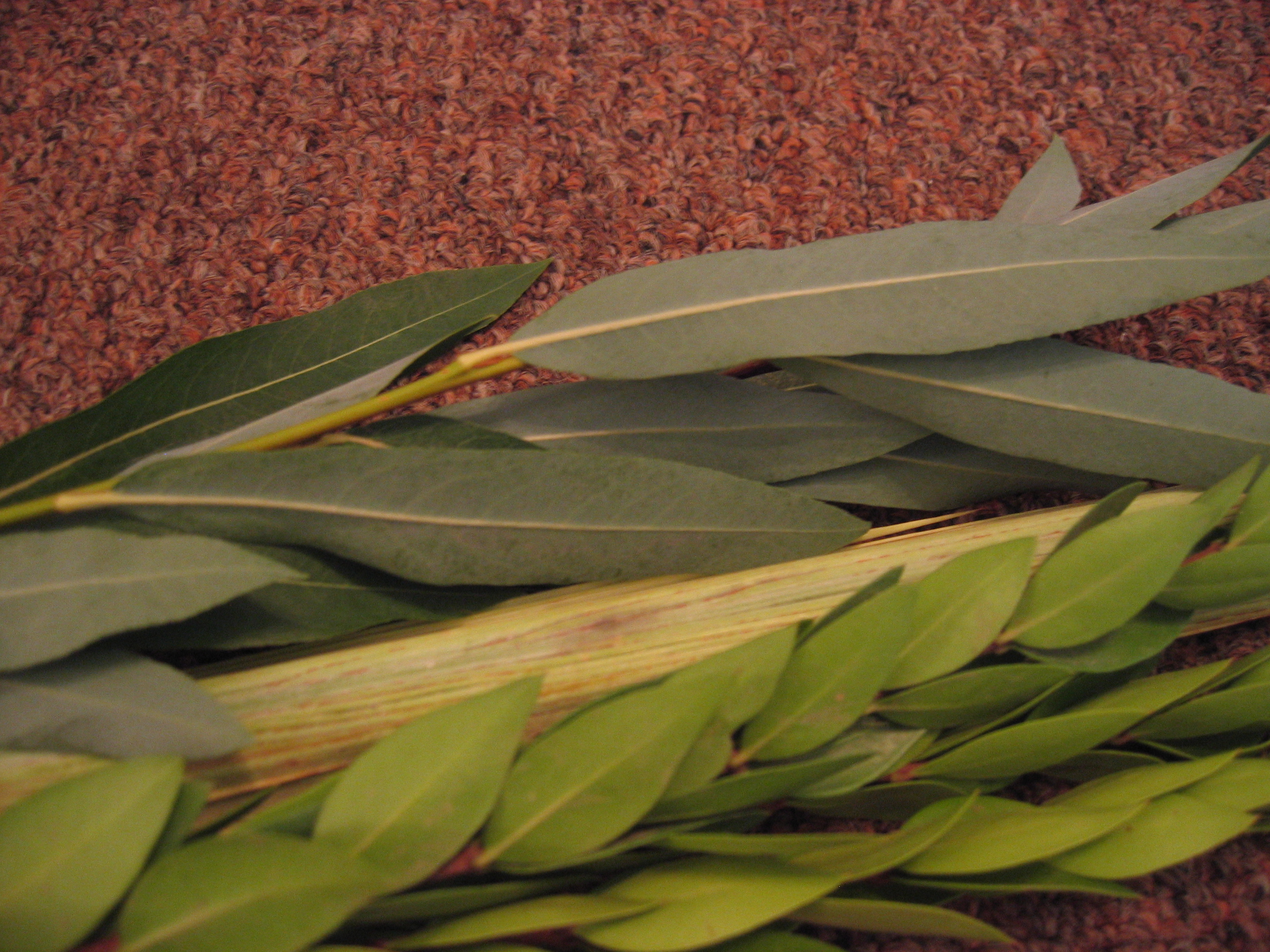
The two aravot branches of the Four Species (rear), along with the lulav (center) and hadassim branches (fore)

Aravah (Hebrew: ערבה, pl. aravot - ערבות) is a leafy branch of the willow tree. It is one of the Four Species (arbaʿath haminim - ארבעת המינים) used in a special waving ceremony during the Jewish holiday of Sukkot. The other species are the lulav (palm frond), hadass (myrtle), and etrog (citron).

The aravah is also used for a separate ceremony on Hoshanah Rabbah, the last day of Sukkot, when five branches are beaten against the ground to the accompaniment of special verses.

The aravah tree typically grows by the side of a river, although in Israel it grows wild in many people's backyards. The branches grow long and are lined with long, narrow leaves. Since this tree requires much water to grow, the picked branches dry out within two or three days. In order to keep them fresh as long as possible for the mitzvah of the Four Species, they are kept in the refrigerator until use, or wrapped in a moist towel.

On each of the seven days of Sukkot (excluding Shabbat), two aravah branches are bound together with the lulav and hadass (this bundle is also referred to as "the lulav"). Together with the etrog, these Four Species are then waved in all four directions, plus up and down, to attest to God's mastery over all of creation, and to symbolically voice a prayer for adequate rainfall over all the Earth's vegetation in the coming year. (See Four Species for the complete description and symbolism of the waving ceremony.)

During the morning prayer service in the synagogue on Hoshanah Rabbah, after the waving of the Four Species, a separate bundle containing five aravah branches are taken in hand by each worshipper. A series of liturgical verses are read, ending with, "Kol mevasser, mevasser ve-omer" (A voice brings news, brings news and says)—expressing hope for the speedy coming of the Messiah. Then the bundle of aravah branches are beaten against the ground until many of the leaves have fallen out. The reasons for this custom are steeped in Kabbalah. The aravot may then be thrown away, used before Passover to burn the Chametz, or are sometimes placed in water in order to grow new aravot trees.

== The Aravah ceremony in the Temple ==
According to the Mishnah, In the days of the Temple in Jerusalem, willow branches were collected from Motsa near Jerusalem and piled upright on the sides of the Altar with their tops bent over the top of the Altar each day of Sukkot. The shofar was sounded, and the worshippers walked about in procession and recited Psalm 117 (as is done today as part of the Hashanot ceremony on Sukkot), accompanied by musical instruments (except on shabbat). In the days of the Temple, the Mishnah reports that after the Aravah ceremony on Hashana Rabba, "the children threw away their lulavim and ate their etrogim (citrons)."

== See also ==
- Four Species
