= Hadass =

Branch of myrtle tree in Judaism

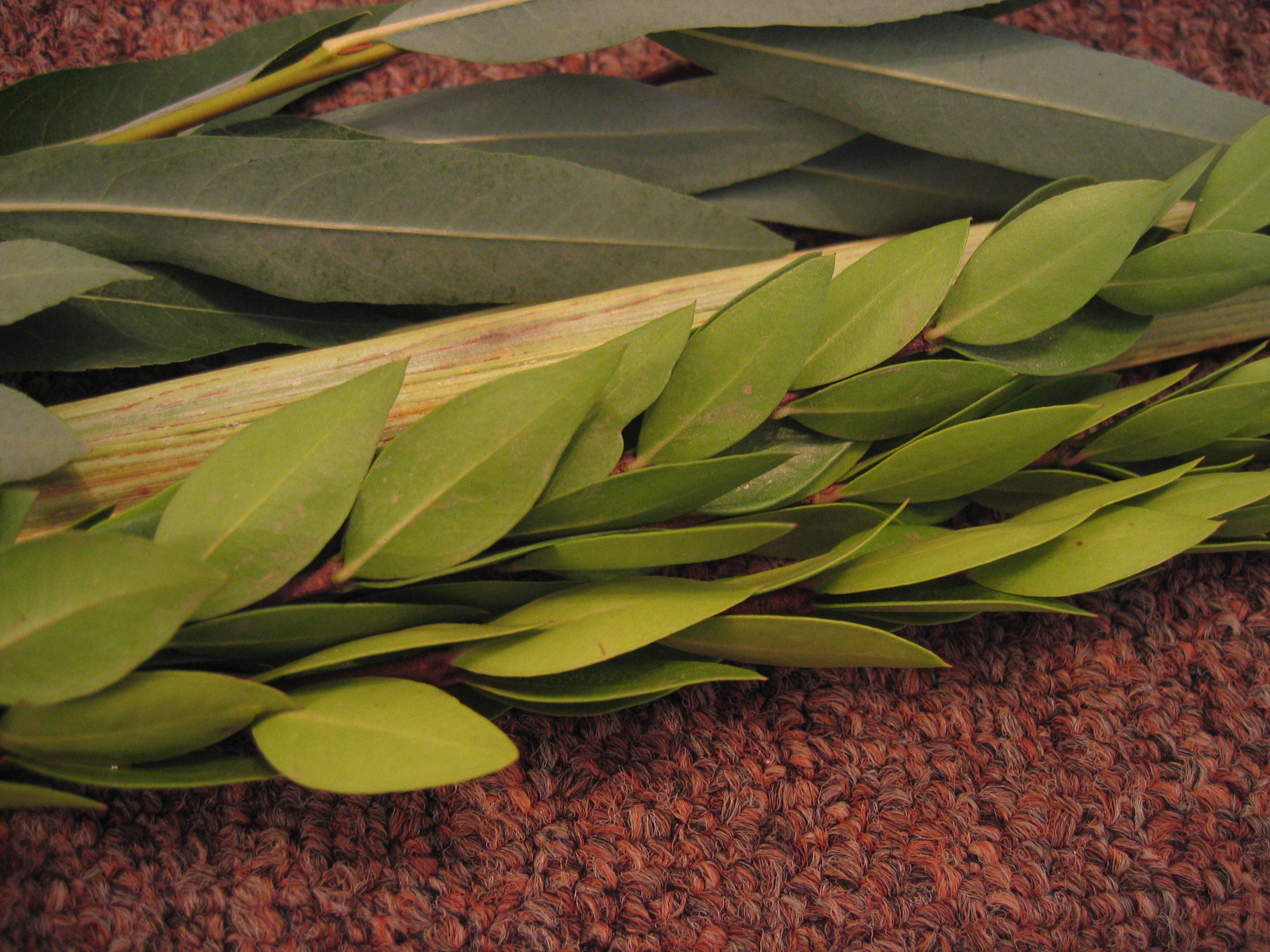
Three hadass branches, seen here in front of the lulav (middle), and the aravah branches in the back

Hadass (Hebrew: הדס, pl. hadassim - הדסים) is a branch of the myrtle tree that forms part of the netilat loulav used on the Jewish holiday of Sukkot.

Hadass is one of the four species (arbaʿath haminim – ארבעת המינים). The others are the lulav (date palm frond), aravah (willow), and etrog (citron). Three hadassim are incorporated into the Four Species and are bound together with the lulav and aravah. Together with the etrog, the lulav is waved in all four directions, plus up and down, to attest to God's mastery over all creation, and to voice a prayer for adequate rainfall over all the Earth's vegetation in the coming year.

A myrtle branch typically grows with tiers of two or three leaves sprouting from the same spot on the branch. Only a "triple hadass" (hadass meshulash), that is to say a branch with three (or more) leaves growing at each tier, is considered a valid hadass for Sukkot. This is because Leviticus 23:40 specifies using an etz avot ("leafy tree"), and a branch with just two leaves growing together is not considered sufficiently leafy. The most perfect hadass is triple-leaved for its whole length. However, as long as a majority of its length is triple-leaved, it is valid.

Botanically speaking, the same myrtle plant can grow branches with two or three leaves per tier. Experiments suggest that plants can be induced to grow triple-leaved branches by trimming or burning them close to the ground at the beginning of springtime or earlier; this causes them to regrow a few long shoots over the course of the year, which are likely to be triple-leaved. One is more likely to obtain triple-leaved branches from breeds of myrtle that are known have produced such branches in the past.

== Other uses ==
Hadass is also used as the "Besamim" or holy spices in some Sephardic and Mizrahi customs for Havdalah.
