= Lulav =

Closed frond of the date palm tree

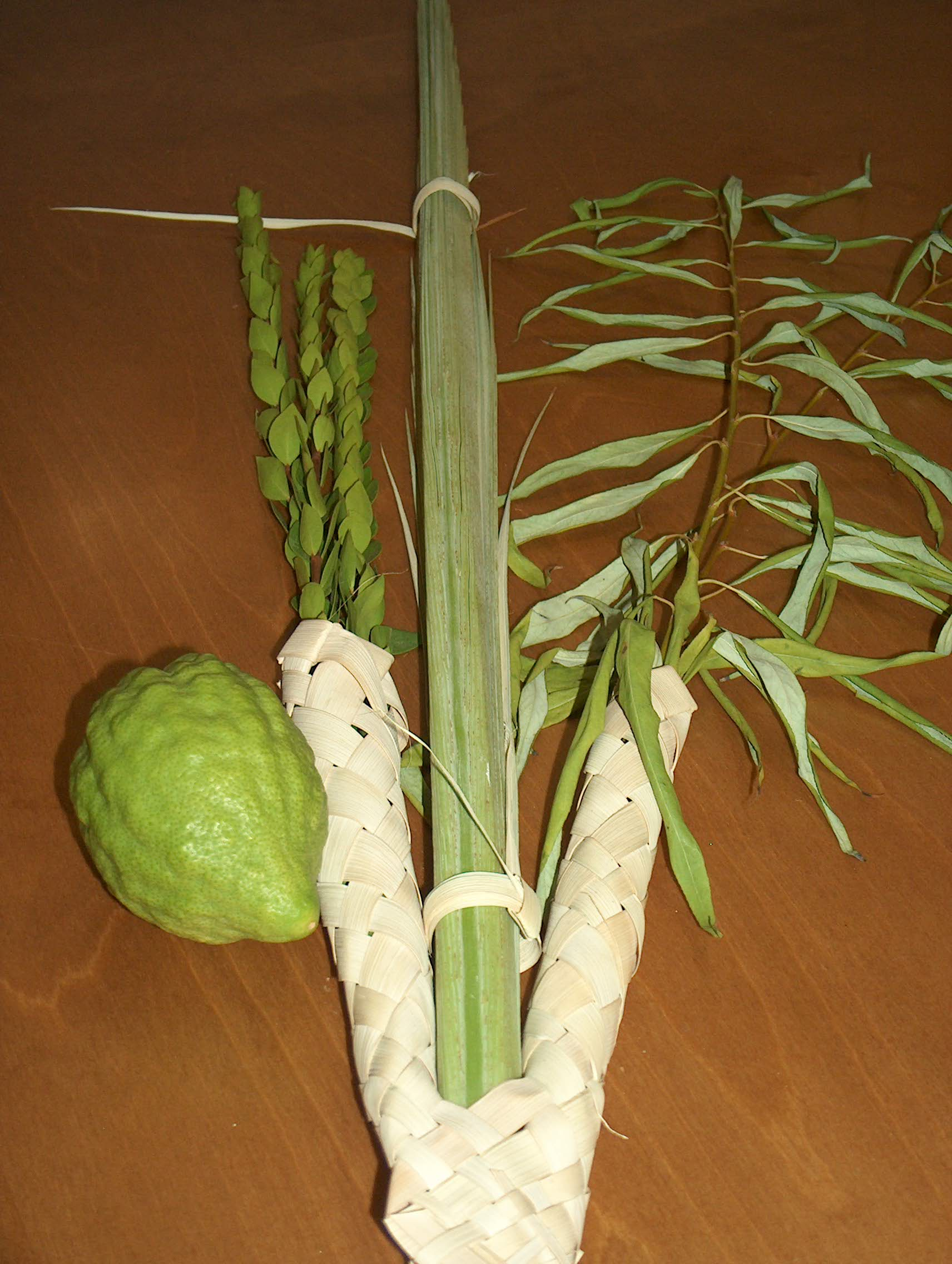
Four Species, with the lulav longest in the middle

Lulav (Hebrew: לוּלָב [luˈlav]) is a closed frond of the date palm tree. It is one of the Four Species used during the Jewish holiday of Sukkot. The other Species are the hadass (myrtle), aravah (willow), and etrog (citron). When bound together, the lulav, hadass, and aravah are commonly referred to as "the lulav".

== Codification in the Torah ==
The Torah mentions the commandments to obtain a lulav for the Sukkot holiday once in Leviticus:

Leviticus 23:40

ולקחתם לכם ביום הראשון פרי עץ הדר כפת תמרים וענף עץ עבת וערבי נחל ושמחתם לפני ה׳ אלהיכם שבעת ימים
"And ye shall take you on the first day the fruit of goodly trees, branches of palm-trees, and boughs of thick trees, and willows of the brook, and ye shall rejoice before the LORD your God seven days."

In the Oral Torah, the Mishnah comments that the biblical commandment to take the lulav, along with the other three species, is for all seven days of Sukkot only in and around the Temple Mount when the Holy Temple in Jerusalem is extant, as indicated by the verse as "in the presence of Hashem, your God, for seven days." In the rest of the Land of Israel, as well as in the Diaspora, the four species are biblically mandated only on the first day of Sukkot. After the destruction of the Temple in 70 CE, Rabbi Yochanan ben Zakai legislated a rabbinical enactment to take the four species for the entire seven days of the holiday in all locations as a commemoration of what was done in the Temple.

=== Classical Jewish Biblical commentators ===
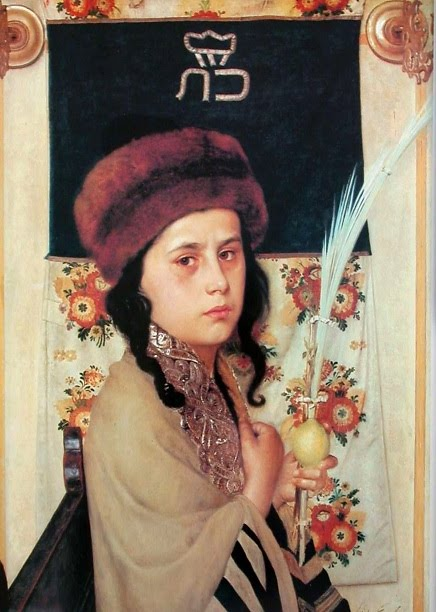
Isidor Kaufmann: Child with Lulav

As with all Biblical verses, Jewish law derives numerous details and specifications relating to the commandments by interpreting the manner in which words are utilized, spelled and juxtaposed in the verses of the Torah.

Rashi explains the pertinent verse in the Bible based on the Talmud's erudition. which focuses on the spelling of the words in the verse that refer to the lulav: kapot t'marim (כפת תמרים, "palms [of] dates"). The first word refers to date stalks (the strands on which the dates sprout) and is written in plural form (kapót - כּפוֹת) instead of singular form (kaf - כף), in order to indicate that the commandment is not to take merely a single leaf of the entire palm. However the word is written in a deficient manner, without the letter vav, as the plural word would normally contain (כפת instead of כפות). Rashi further elucidates based on the Talmud's erudition, that the missing letter vav is to indicate that only a single palm is to be taken. The Talmud also uses this spelling irregularity to suggest according to the opinion of Rabbi Yehudah in the name of Rabbi Tarfon, that the lulav must be bound if its leaves spread away from the spine of the palm. This teaching is derived from the similarity between the spelling of the Hebrew words for "palm" and "binding", which would not be a viable teaching had the word for palm been written in its strictly singular form of kaf.

The Keli Yakar comments that the words verse in Psalms 96:12 az yeranenu kol atzei ya'ar (אז ירננו כל עצי יער, "then all the trees of the forest will sing with joy"), is not only a reference to the shaking of the four species but a hint to this Biblical specification: the Hebrew word az (אז, "then") is composed of two letters, an aleph (א), with a numerical value of 1, and a zayin (ז), with a numerical value of 7, hinting that the four species are to be taken 1 day outside of the Temple area and seven days in the Temple.

== Regulations of the lulav ==
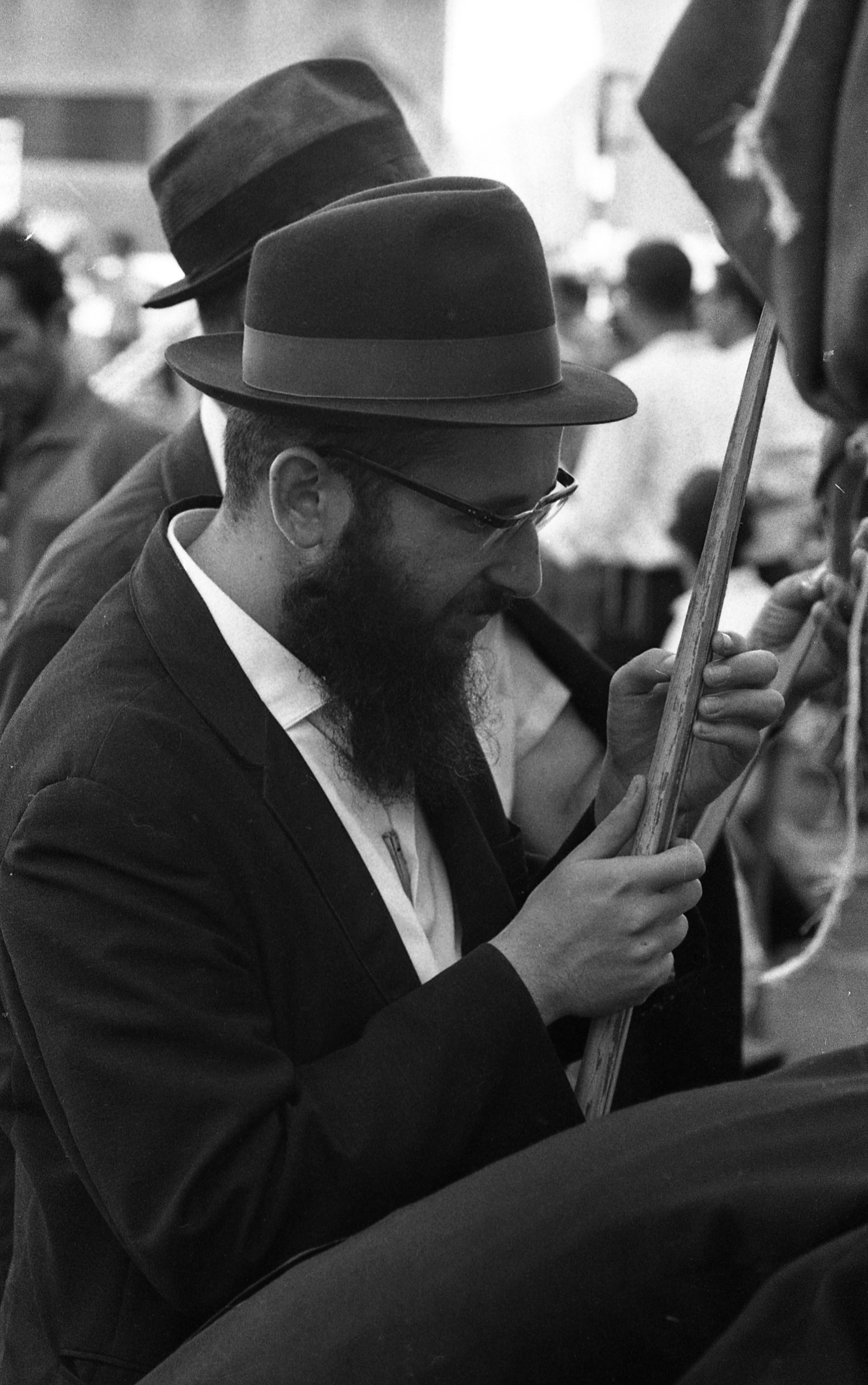
A man testing whether a lulav is kosher, Jerusalem, 1969

A lulav, as with all mitzvah articles (those used to fulfill biblical and rabbinical requirements within Judaism), must meet certain specifications in order to be kosher and permissible to be used to fulfill the commandment of the four species.

Ideally, a lulav consists of a tightly closed frond of the date palm tree.

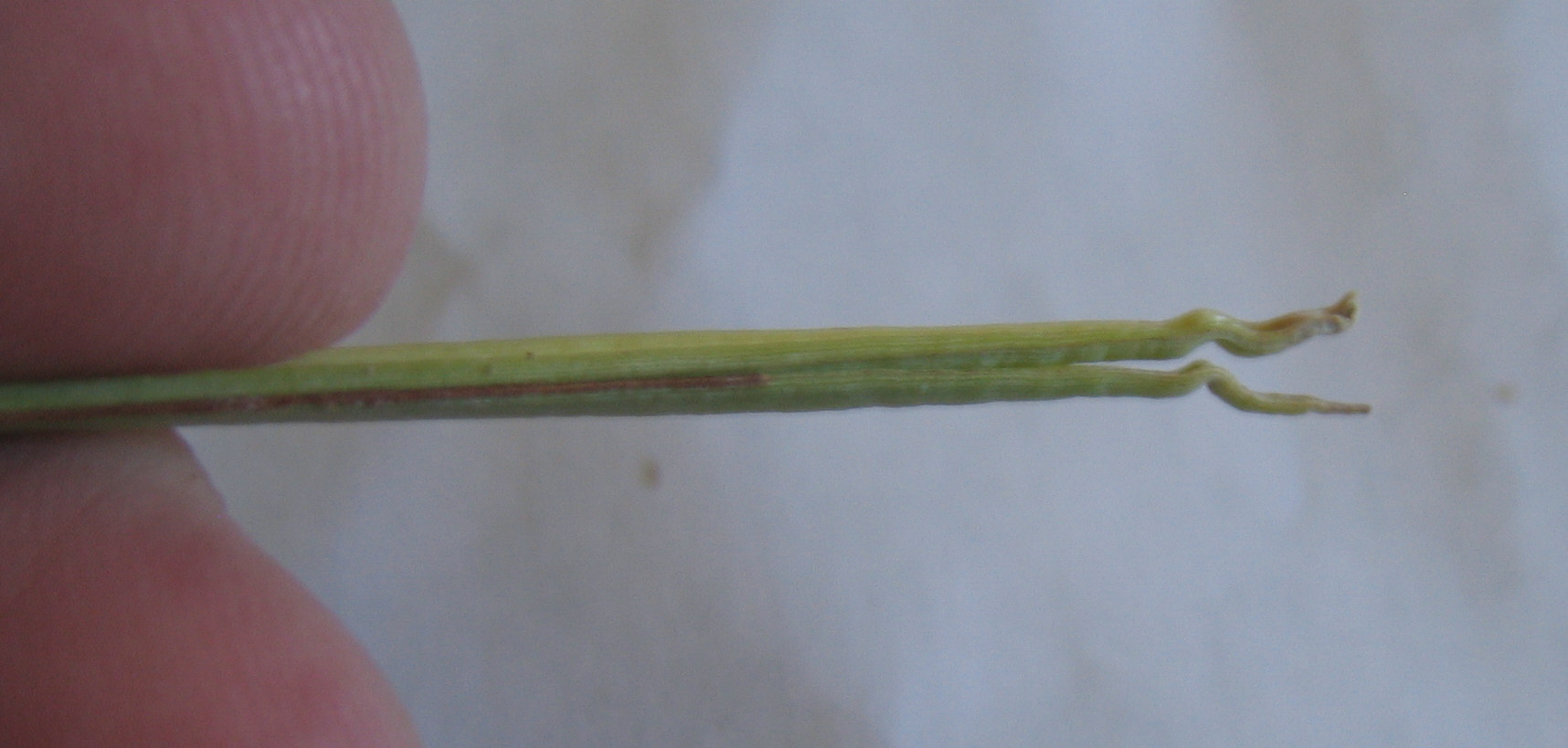
The tiyomet, or twin middle leaf of the lulav, shown split

To qualify, the lulav must be straight, with whole leaves that lie closely together, and not be bent or broken at the top. The twin middle-most leaves, which naturally grow together and are known as the tiyomet (תיומת, "twin"), should ideally not be split at all; however, the lulav remains kosher as long as the twin middle leaves are not split more than a handbreadth, approximating 3-4 inches. This rule applies on the first day of Sukkot in the Land of Israel, and on the first two days elsewhere. On Chol HaMoed, the disqualifications arising from using a lulav with a split middle leaf do not apply.

The term lulav also refers to the lulav in combination with two of the other species—the aravah and the hadass—that are bound together to perform the mitzvah of waving the lulav. These three species are held in one hand while the etrog is held in the other. The user brings his or her hands together and waves the species in all four directions, plus up and down, to attest to God's mastery over all of creation. This ritual also symbolically voices a prayer for adequate rainfall over all the Earth's vegetation in the coming year. (See Four Species for the complete description and symbolism of the waving ceremony.)

Although Jews are commanded to take the four species together, the rabbinically ordained blessing mentions only the lulav because it is the largest and most evident of the four species.

The biblical reference to the four species in Sukkot can be found in Leviticus Chapter 23, verse 40. The etrog is referred to as "Citrus fruit" (Etz Hadar), and the Lulav is referred to as "Palm branches" (Kapot t'marim).

Each species is said to kabbalistically represent an aspect of the user's body; the lulav represents the spine, the myrtle the eyes, the willow the lips, and the etrog represents the heart.
