= S'chach =

Roof covering of a sukkah

S'chach

S'chach (Hebrew: סכך [s̩ˈχaχ]) is the Hebrew name for the material used as a roof for a sukkah, used on the Jewish holiday of Sukkot. It translates to "thatch" or "roof".

== Jewish laws on s'chach ==
The halacha (Jewish laws) regarding Sukkot and the sukkah are found in Tractate Sukkah, part of Seder Moed (“the Order of Festivals”), in the Talmud.

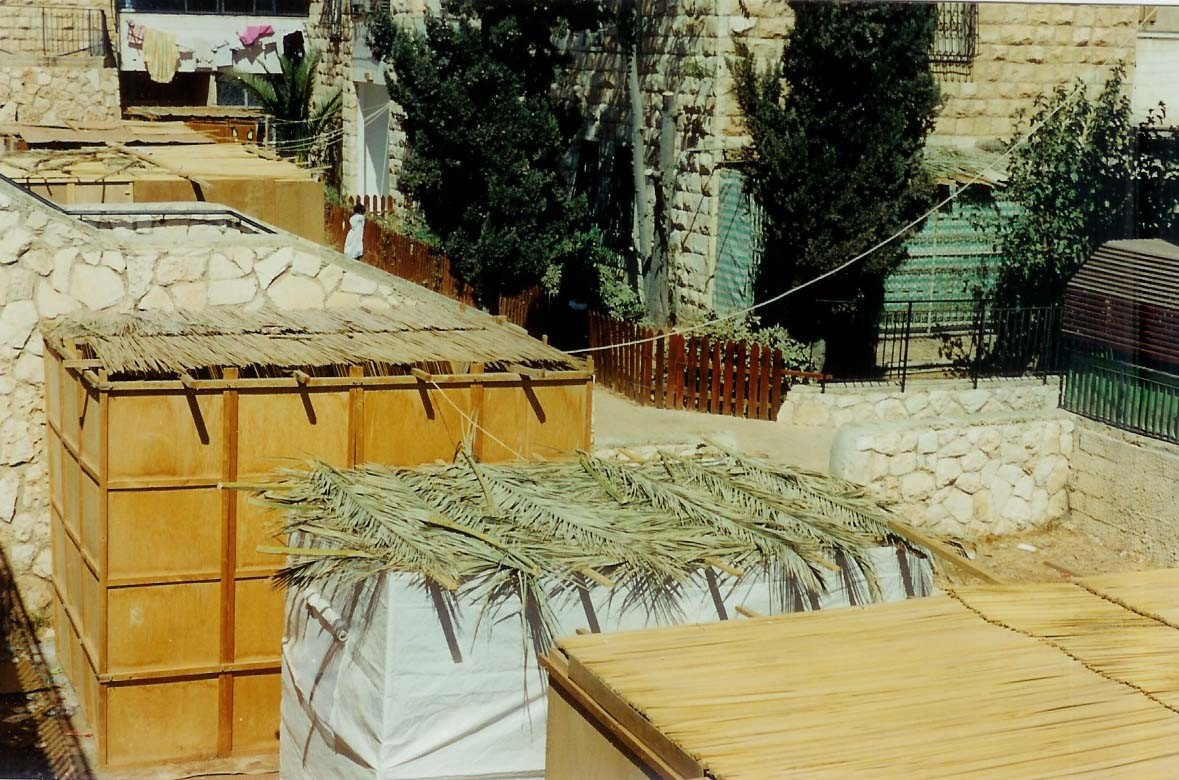
View of different types of s'chach (sukkah roofs)

=== Materials ===
The s'chach must be made from plants, i.e., materials grown from the ground, such as palm leaves, bamboo sticks and pine tree branches. While vines could be used to construct the s'chach, it must be disconnected from the ground, So, a garden trellis with living vines (i.e., vines still rooted into the ground) could not be part of a valid s'chach.

Some types of wooden slats and other types of organic material can be used for s'chach, unless they were processed for a different use, such as a bundle of hay. Materials that can become ritually impure, such as eating utensils, cannot be used for the s'chach.

=== Structure ===
The s'chach must rest on top of the sukkah without being tied down to the structure itself. Similarly, while one can re-use a sukkah, the s'chach must be replaced each year. This does not mean one must build it from scratch but, at a minimum, the s'chach must be lifted off of the sukkah and then put back in place. The s'chach must be placed after the sukkah's walls are completed.

=== Additional specifications ===
Other rules regarding the s'chach include the following.

- As a minimum, the s'chach must be dense enough that it provides more shade than sunlight in the sukkah, but at night it should not prevent one from seeing the stars.
  - If sunlight entering the sukkah through the s'chach is more than seven square tefachim (hand-breadths, approximately 56 cm^{2} or 22 in^{2}) at noontime, the sukkah is invalid.
  - If rain cannot enter the sukkah, it is invalid.
- Wooden boards that are more than four tefachim (approximately 8 cm or 3.2 in) wide cannot be used.
- One cannot use branches that are likely to break apart and disturb those in the sukkah.
- The materials of the s'chach must not be malodorous or infested with bugs, lest they drive out of the sukkah.

== See also ==
- Tabernacle
- Shalosh Regalim (Three Pilgrimage Festivals)
- Chol HaMoed
- Simchat Beit HaShoeivah
- Shemini Atzeret
- Simchat Torah
