= Citrus medica × aurantium =

Citrus medica × aurantium may refer to one of several hybrids between a citron and sour orange:

- Bizzarria, a graft hybrid between a Florentine citron and sour orange
- Lemon, Citrus limon, any of the various commercially prominent citron-sour orange hybrids
- Pompia, Citrus medica var. tuberosa, a hybrid between a Diamante citron and a sour orange
- Rhobs el Arsa, a hybrid between a Diamante citron or common poncire citron and a sour orange
