= Bratus (tree) =

Tree of unknown species mentioned by Pliny

Bratus is the name of a tree Pliny the Elder described in his Naturalis Historia:

Book 12, chapt. 39 (Plin. Nat. 12.39)—THE TREE CALLED BRATUS.

Hence it is, that they import from the country of the Elymæi the wood of a tree called bratus, which is similar in appearance to a spreading cypress. Its branches are of a whitish colour, and the wood, while burning, emits a pleasant odour; it is highly spoken of by Claudius Cæsar, in his History, for its marvellous properties. He states that the Parthians sprinkle the leaves of it in their drink, that its smell closely resembles that of the cedar, and that the smoke of it is efficacious in counteracting the effects of smoke emitted by other wood. This tree grows in the countries that lie beyond the Pasitigris, in the territory of the city of Sittaca, upon Mount Zagrus.

Pliny's editors John Bostock and Henry Thomas Riley note regarding bratus:

Although the savin shrub, the Juniperus sabina of Carl Linnaeus, bears this name in Greek, it is evident, as Fée says, that Pliny does not allude to it, but to a coniferous tree, as it is that family which produces a resinous wood with a balsamic odour when ignited. Bauhin and others would make the tree meant to be the Thuja occidentalis of Carl Linnaeus; but, as Fée observes, that tree is in reality a native originally of Canada, while the Thuja orientalis is a native of Japan. He suggests, however, that the "Thuja articulata" of Mount Atlas (Tetraclinis articulata) may have possibly been the citrus of Pliny.

Editors' note is still unclear while Conifers are not family, Juniperus sabina is coniferous and has some ethereal oils in its issues too. In Bostock and Riley's last sentence, "citrus" meant "cedar". The Greek name κέδρος kédros gave the Latin word cedrus and was similarly applied to citron and the word citrus is derived from the same root. Name "citrus" was also used for both cedar and citron, particularly by Pliny. However, as a loan word in English, cedar had become fixed to its biblical sense of Cedrus by the time of its first recorded usage in AD 1000.).

== See also ==
- Thyine wood
