= Red lemon =

Red citrus fruit

- Genus: Citrus
- Species: Citrus limonimedica
- Cultivar: 'Pigmentata'

The red lemon, also known as limon rosso or limone rosso ISA, and botanically classified as Citrus limonimedica 'Pigmentata', is a species of small evergreen tree in the Citrus genus of the flowering plant family Rutaceae. It is a hybrid of the lemon and the citron. The tree's fruits, also referred to as red lemons, resemble a red or deep orange version of a true lemon, both outside and inside. Red lemons have a short shelf life, typically lasting only two or three days, and thus they are not often grown commercially. It is instead typically cultivated on a small scale through specialty growers, especially in eastern Sicily, near Syracuse. It is also grown as a novelty fruit tree in home gardens in Italy.

== Description ==
The tree is an evergreen and is of medium vigor. It has a globose canopy, with branches that are not very spiny. The foliage is variegated.

The tree is of medium re-flowering. It blossoms in the spring and summer. The flowers are white and medium perfumed. These flowers are either single or in small groups.

Fructification is early and medium abundant. The fruit is large, very persistent, ellipsoidal, having been described as an "almost elongated 'drop'" shape, with a large apical nipple and an intense, attractive anthocyanic red color on 70-80% of its surface when ripe.

== Origins ==
The origin appears not to be known with certainty. At least one source states that it is believed to be native to the Mediterranean region.

== Alternative names ==
The red lemon is also known by many other names across Europe, including rosso lemons, limone rosso, mulled wine lemon, red citron, blushing lemons, and red pigmented lemons.
