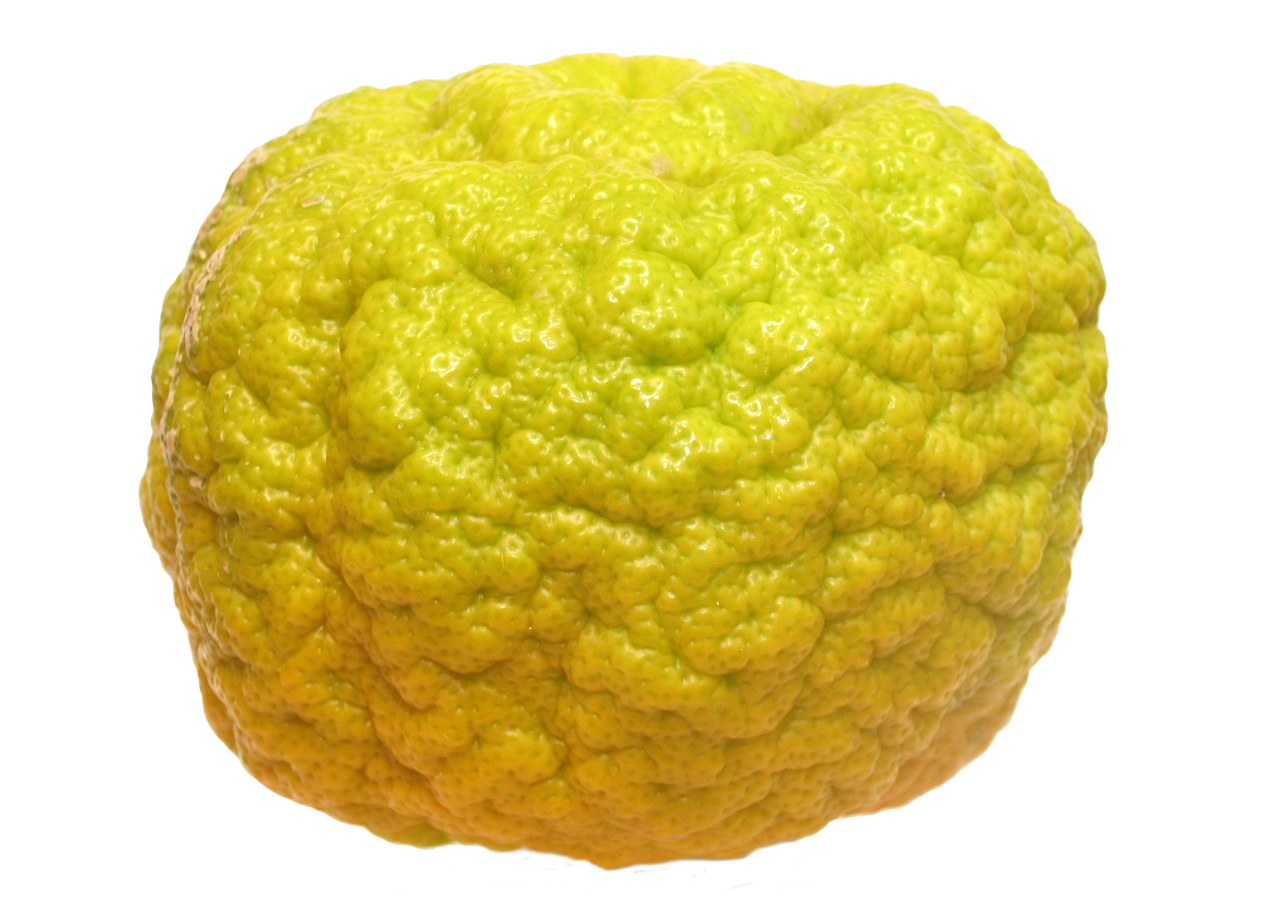
- Pompia fruit

Scientific classification
- Kingdom: Plantae
- Clade: Tracheophytes
- Clade: Angiosperms
- Clade: Eudicots
- Clade: Rosids
- Order: Sapindales
- Family: Rutaceae
- Genus: Citrus
- Species: C. medica
- Variety: C. m. var. tuberosa

Trinomial name
- Citrus medica var. tuberosa Risso (1813)

Synonyms
- Citrus medica tuberosa Risso & Poiteau; Citrus medica monstruosa Moris; Citrus monstruosa; Citrus × monstruosa; Citrus limon var. pompia Camarda; Citrus limon var. pompia var. nova Camarda; Citrus medica × aurantium

= Pompia =

Variety of plant

Pompia (Citrus medica var. tuberosa), also called pumpia, sa pompia, spompia, and China citron, is a Citrus hybrid cultivated for its edible fruit. It is a taxonomical synonym of Citrus medica.

== Distribution ==
Pompia originated and is found only in Sardinia, especially the eastern half, where it can be found growing wild in citrus groves and cultivated in backyards and orchards. The earliest descriptions of it date back to 1780 and it likely originated around 1760 in Milis.

== Description ==
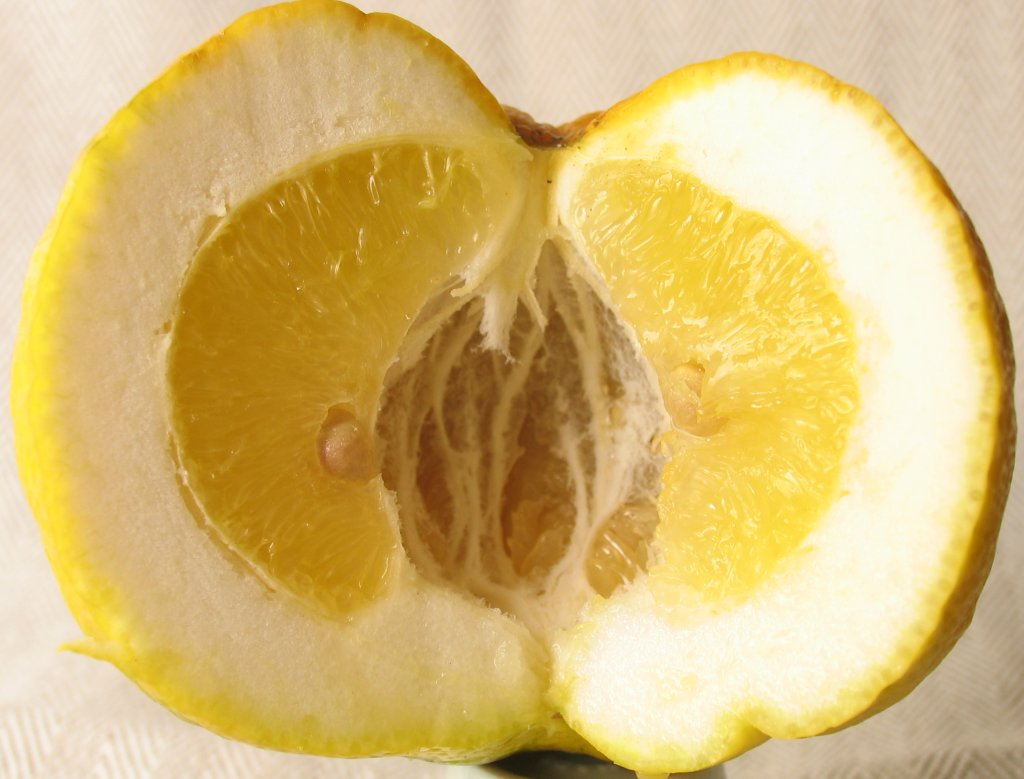
Vertical cross-section

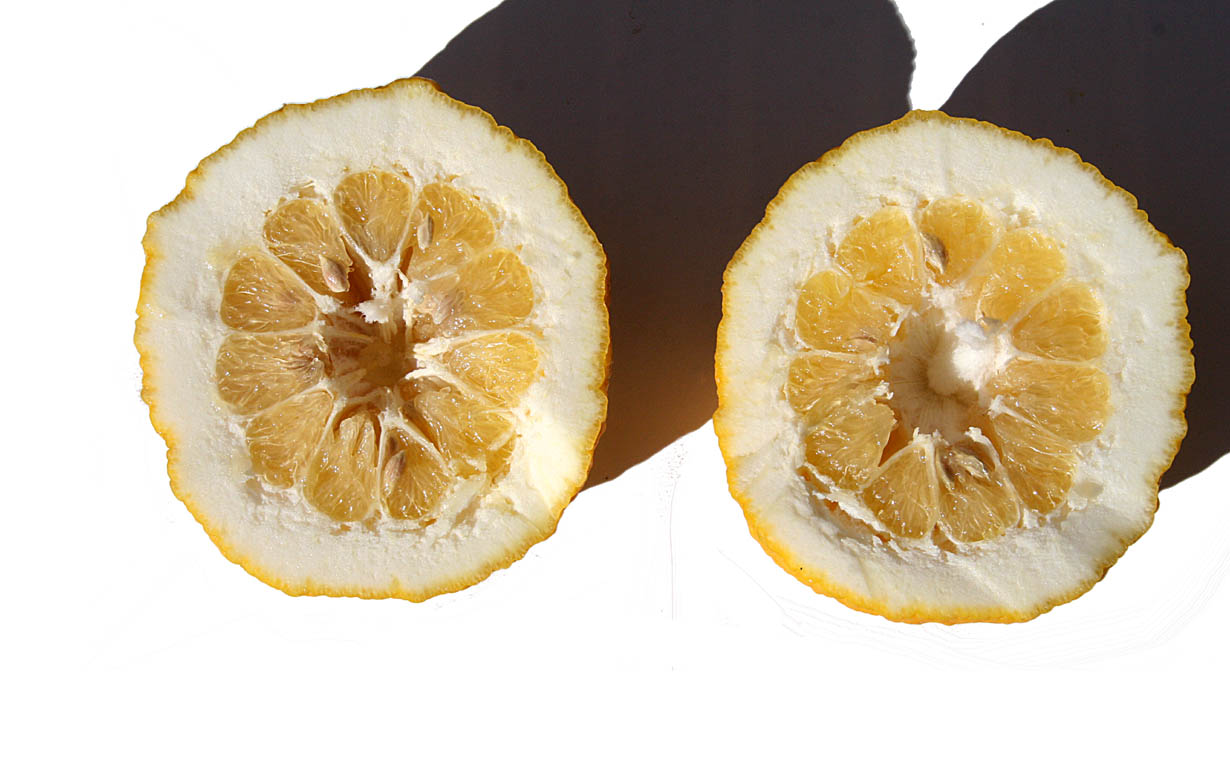
Horizontal cross-section

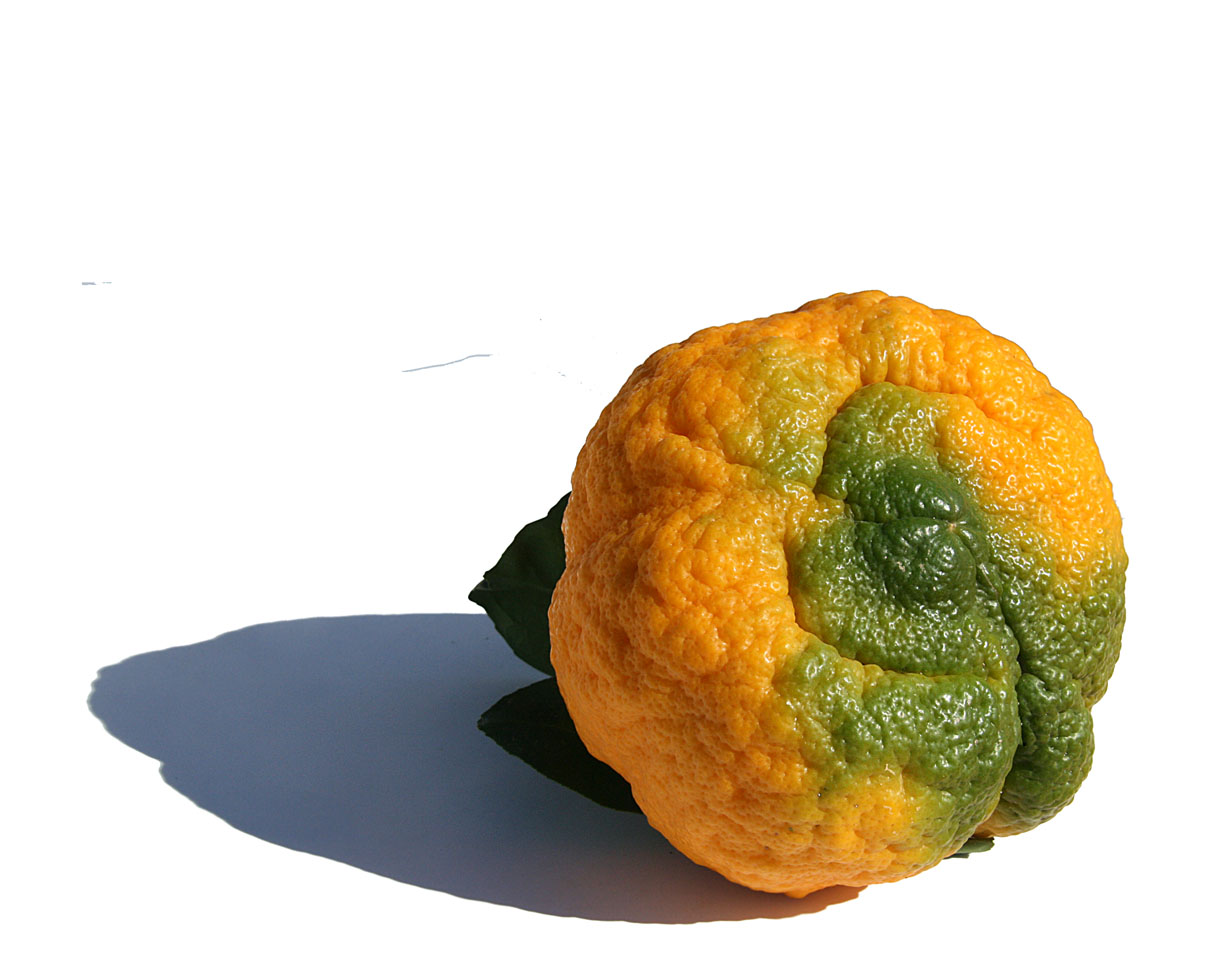
A pompia with prominent ribbing

The fruit is moderately large (at least as large as a grapefruit), round and sometimes oblate or square in shape, and has a rough, warty, yellow (green when unripe), thick, and sometimes ribbed rind. It sometimes has a circular depression in the top or bottom. The inner pulp is acidic, yellow, and mostly dry and is generally considered inedible; it has been described as bitter and chewy. It has a subtle fragrance and contains 13–14 wedges with large vesicles. It is usually seedless but may contain one to three polyembryonic seeds which measure 8 to 12 millimeters (0.31 to 0.47 inches) in length and are roughly triangular in shape. It weighs up to 1.5 pounds (0.7 kilograms). The tree is densely branched and grows 2 to 3 meters (6.6 to 9.8 feet) in height and has an expanded and erect posture. The petiole is unwinged and measures 6–10 millimeters in length. The leaves are elliptical in shape and are dark green in color; they are leathery and the apex is rounded in an ovate to lanceolate shape. The margin is entire and the midrib is very defined. The flowers are white in color and are either solitary or in clusters of two to eight; they usually have five petals. They have numerous stamens and dorsifixed anthers, and the stigma is round and green in color and irregularly lobed. The tree fruits from October to February or March.

== Uses ==
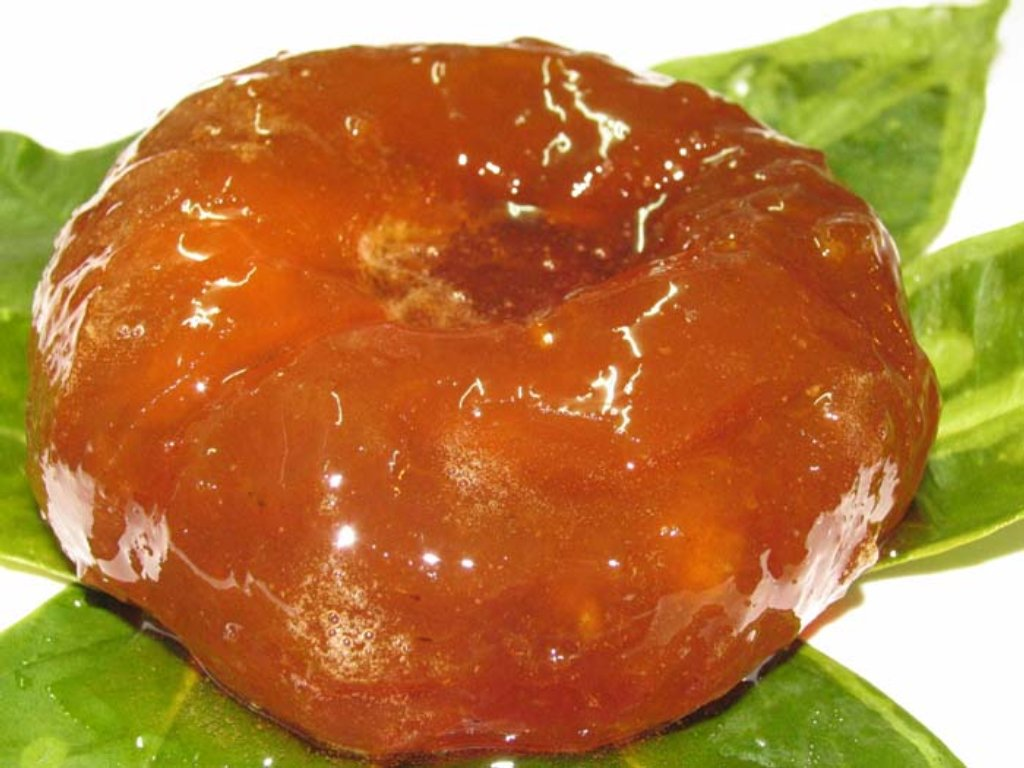
Sa pompia intrea, a traditional dessert of Siniscola consisting of the candied rind of the fruit covered in honey

The fruit has been grown and cultivated for at least two centuries in Sardinia; however, it did not gain international popularity until the 1990s, when a large orchard of pompia trees were planted as part of a social farming project. Since then, it has become a presidium of Slow Food. It is most notably used in sa pompia intrea, a traditional dessert of Siniscola in which the rind of the fruit is candied and then covered with honey and served on an orange leaf. It is also used in various liquors and is sometimes grafted onto sour orange.

== Genetics ==
Before the parentage was confirmed, the pompia was thought to be a hybrid of a citron and grapefruit or citron and lemon; however, recent studies have proven the pompia to be a hybrid of the citron (Citrus medica) and the sour orange (Citrus aurantium), with the citron being the pollen parent and the sour orange being the seed parent. The variety of the citron parent has not been confirmed, but it is likely a Diamante citron or a common poncire. The pompia is genetically synonymous with the Rhobs el Arsa and Poncire de Collioure citrons. The essential oil composition in the leaf is closer to that of a citron, while the essential oil composition in the zest is closer to that of a sour orange. The major compound in the fruit is limonene at 94%, and it contains smaller amounts of sesquiterpenes and its derivatives. The rind of the fruit contains antioxidant substances and the leaves contain antimicrobial substances that kill Listeria bacteria on foods.

== See also ==
- List of citrus fruits
