= Rhobs el Arsa =

Citrus fruit and plant

Rhobs al-Arsa (Citrus limon (L.) Burm. f.) is a very popular citrus fruit in Morocco.

== Names ==
Rhobs al-Arsa is Arabic for bread of the garden, or "Garden Loaf". This citrus hybrid has many other names, such as Al-zanbu, Khoubs al-Arsa, Koubs al-Arsa, Kubbâd, Robs al-Arsa, Zamboa, Zanbo'a, and Zemboua.

== Description ==
The plant is an evergreen shrub with young green shoots, and rounded leaves that are green and shiny. The fruit is round and rather flat, with a small nipple at the apex, and an inverted ring around the nipple. Its skin is usually smooth. The pulp is acidic and fruity, with a sweet and pleasant albedo, slightly bitter bark. Maturity in February or March. It is cold-hardy to -2 °C / 3 °C and is an open-pollinated seedling.

== Genetics ==
The Rhobs al Arsa has long been viewed as a citron hybrid, though different cultivars have been suggested for the parents, for example, Moroccan citron as the male parent and sour orange as the female parent, citron or lemon and a mandarin.

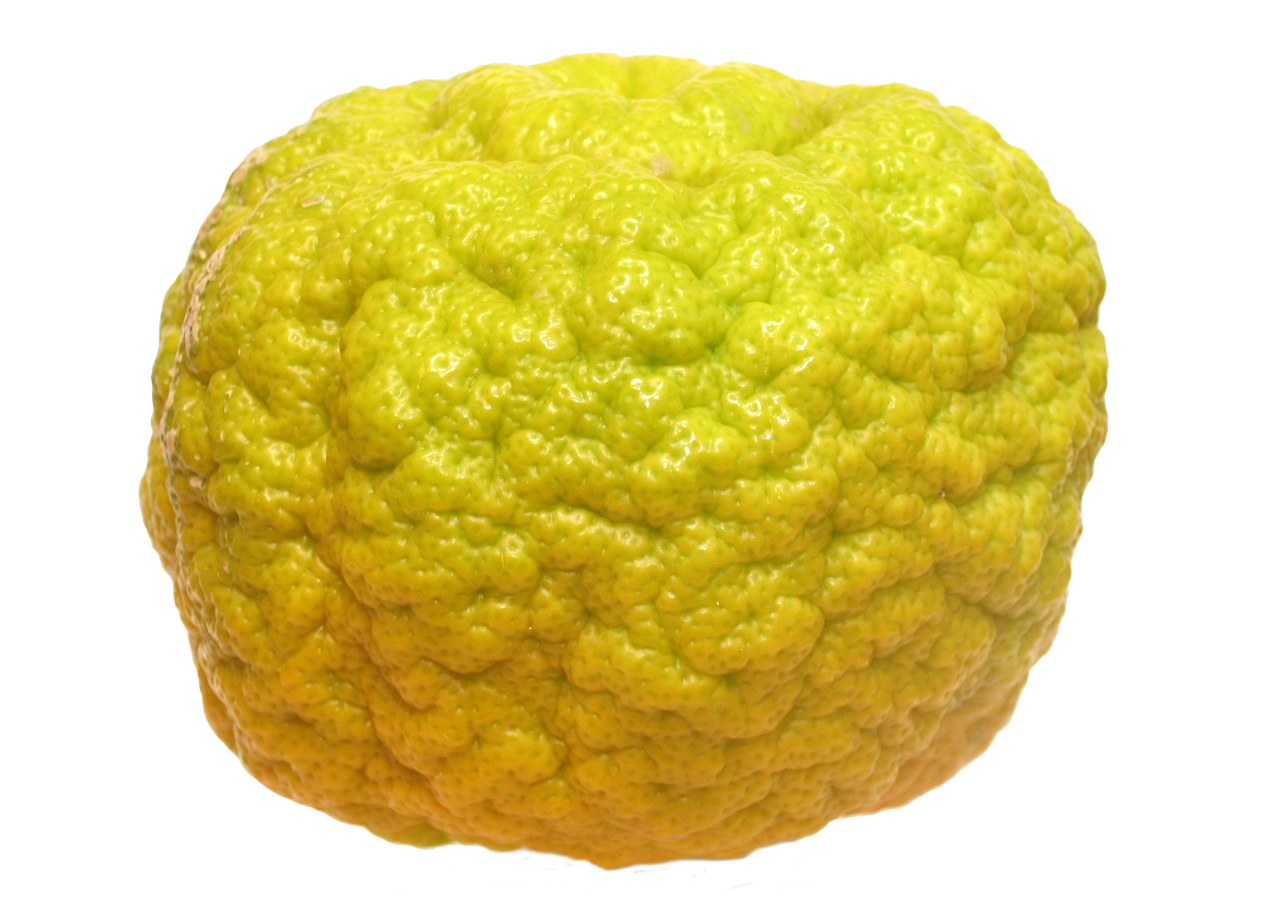
The pompia, a Sardinian citrus genetically synonymous with the Rhobs el Arsa

Detailed genomic analysis showed Rhobs al Arsa to be highly similar to several cultivars of the Citrus limetta, the limetta or Persian sweet lime, and likely shared a common origin with them, arising from a cross between citron (Citrus medica) and sour orange (Citrus × aurantium). The common lemon and several other hybrids arose from distinct hybridization events involving the same two species. This proposed parentage was confirmed by a study of the native Sardinian citrus, the pompia (C. medica tuberosa), which was found to be genetically synonymous with the Rhobs el Arsa, both descended from the same hybrid, the product of a citron pollinating a sour orange, with the citron likely to be a native Italian variety such as the Diamante or the Common Poncire citrons. Such citrons had been cultivated together with the sour orange around the Mediterranean after the introduction of the latter by Moors in the 8th century, and frequent spontaneous crosses are likely to have occurred. Another Mediterranean variety, the Poncire de Collioure, was likewise found to be synonymous with Rhobs el Arsa and pompia.
