= Euparal =

Euparal is a synthetic microscopy mountant originally formulated in 1904 by Professor G. Gilson, the professor of Zoology at Louvain University, Louvain, Belgium. It has been manufactured by several companies, but is now exclusively manufactured by ASCO Laboratories, Manchester, England.

Euparal is used extensively in the mounting of entomological and histological specimens, and has gained much favour as a microscopy mountant due to its low refractive index of 1.483. Microscopic objects, such as cells, are stained with carmine or other stains and slides are passed through dehydration grades and finally mounted in a drop of Euparal.

Euparal is a mixture of camsal (itself a mixture of camphor and salol), sandarac, eucalyptol, and paraldehyde and has a lower refractive index than Canada balsam.
