= Thyine wood =

15th-century English name for Tetraclinis articulata

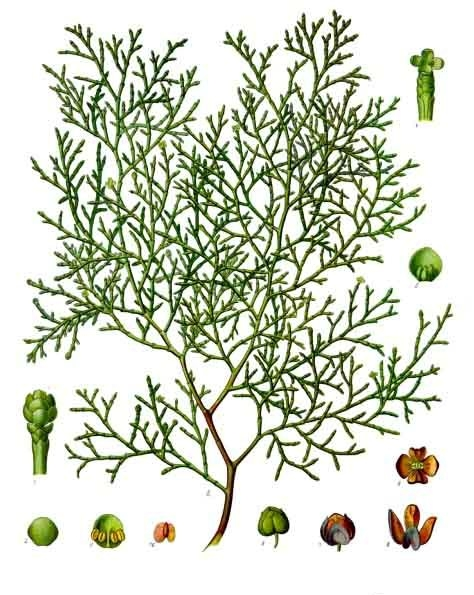
classic drawing of the tree

Thyine wood is a 15th-century English name for a wood from the tree known botanically as Tetraclinis articulata (syn. Callitris quadrivalvis, Thuja articulata). The name is derived from the Greek word thuon (θύον), "fragrant wood," or possibly thuein (θύειν), “to sacrifice”, and it was so called because it was burnt in sacrifices, on account of its fragrance.

Theophrastus, in his Enquiry Into Plants, writes that thyine wood was called thyon (θύον) and thya (θύα). He notes that, because of its durability and quality, it was used to make valuable objects and was among the woods used for carving images. He also states that thyine wood grew near the temple of Zeus Ammon and in the district of Cyrene.

In ancient Rome, wood from this tree was called citrum, "citrus wood". It was considered very valuable, and was used for making articles of furniture by the Greeks and Romans. Craftsmen who worked in citrus wood and ivory had their own guild (collegium).

The Suda writes that when Barnabas's body was discovered in Cyprus, the Gospel of Matthew was lying on his chest, and the book had wooden covers made of thyine wood. In another entry, it mentions that Massinissa sent the Rhodians a tribute that included 30 talents of ivory and 50 of thyine wood, which was intended for the preparation of statues they had voted to make.

Thyine wood is mentioned in the King James Version of the Bible at Revelation 18:12 as being among the articles which would cease to be purchased when Babylon fell. The New International Version translates the passage "citron wood"; the Amplified Bible translates it as "scented wood". This wood is also mentioned in the 1st Book of Kings, chapter 10, in a list of items brought to Solomon by the navy of Hiram.

The resin from this wood is used as the basis for euparal, a mounting medium used in microscopy.
