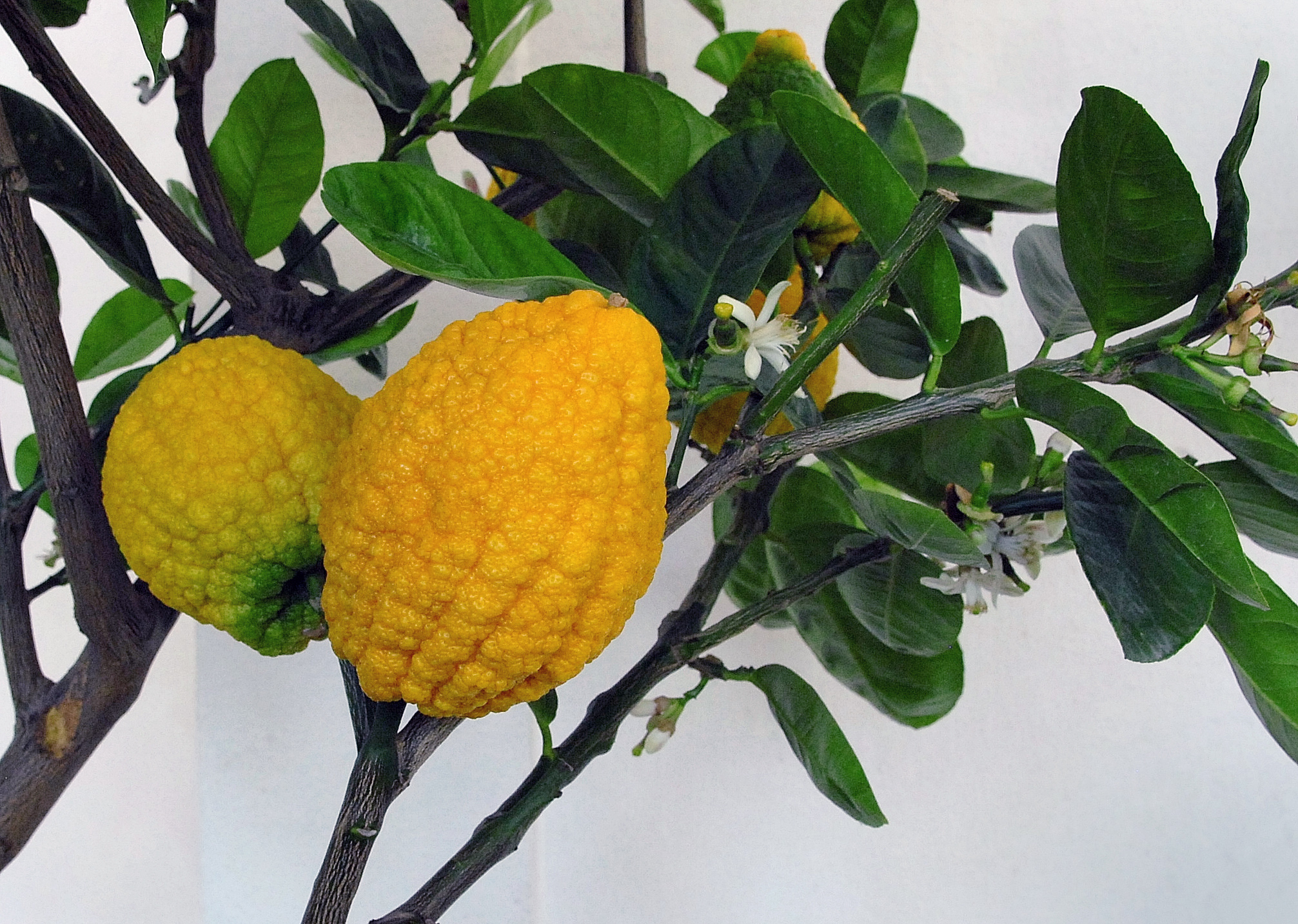

Conservation status
- Least Concern (IUCN 3.1)

Scientific classification
- Kingdom: Plantae
- Clade: Tracheophytes
- Clade: Angiosperms
- Clade: Eudicots
- Clade: Rosids
- Order: Sapindales
- Family: Rutaceae
- Genus: Citrus
- Species: C. medica

Binomial name
- Citrus medica L.

Synonyms
- Citrus alata (Tanaka) Tanaka; Citrus bicolor Poit. & Turpin; Citrus cedra Link; Citrus fragrans Salisb.; Citrus limonimedica (Lush.); Citrus odorata (Wester) Tanaka

= Citron =

Species of citrus plant

The citron (Citrus medica) is a large fragrant citrus fruit with a thick, coarse rind. It resembles a lemon, but is larger. It is one of the original citrus fruits from which all other citrus types developed through natural hybrid speciation or artificial hybridization. Though citron cultivars take on a wide variety of physical forms, they are all closely related genetically. It is used in Asian and Mediterranean cuisine, traditional medicines, perfume, and religious rituals and offerings. Hybrids of citrons with other citrus are commercially more prominent, most notably lemons and many limes, which were created using citrons.

== Etymology ==
The fruit's name is derived from the Latin citrus, which is also the origin of the genus name. The binomial name Citrus medica derives from Media, the kingdom of the Medes, where it was believed to originate (but see "Origin and distribution" below).

=== Other languages ===
A source of confusion is that 'citron' in French and English are false friends, as the French word 'citron' refers to what in English is a lemon; whereas the French word for the citron is 'cédrat'. Into the 16th century, the English term citron included the lemon and perhaps the lime as well. Other languages that use variants of citron to refer to the lemon include Armenian, Czech, Dutch, Finnish, German, Estonian, Latvian, Lithuanian, Hungarian, Esperanto, Polish and the Scandinavian languages.

In Italian it is known as cedro, the same name used also to indicate the coniferous tree cedar. Similarly, in Latin, citrus, or thyine wood referred to the wood of a North African cypress, Tetraclinis articulata. In Indo-Iranian languages, it is called toranj, as against naranj ('bitter orange'). Both names were borrowed into Arabic and introduced into Spain and Portugal after their occupation by Muslims in AD 711, whence the latter became the source of the name orange through rebracketing (and the former of 'toronja' and 'toranja', which today describe the grapefruit in Spanish and Portuguese respectively).

Dutch merchants seasonally import Succade for baked goods; a thick, light green colored commercially candied half peeling from Indonesia and other countries (sukade – Indonesian word for love, Citrus médica variety 'Macrocárpa'), which can reach 2.5 kilograms in mass. A bitter taste is removed by salt treatment before processing into confectionery.

In Hebrew it is called an Etrog (אתרוג); in Yiddish, it is pronounced "esrog" or "esreg". The citron plays an important role in the harvest holiday of Sukkot paired with lulavim (fronds of the date palm).

== Origin and distribution ==
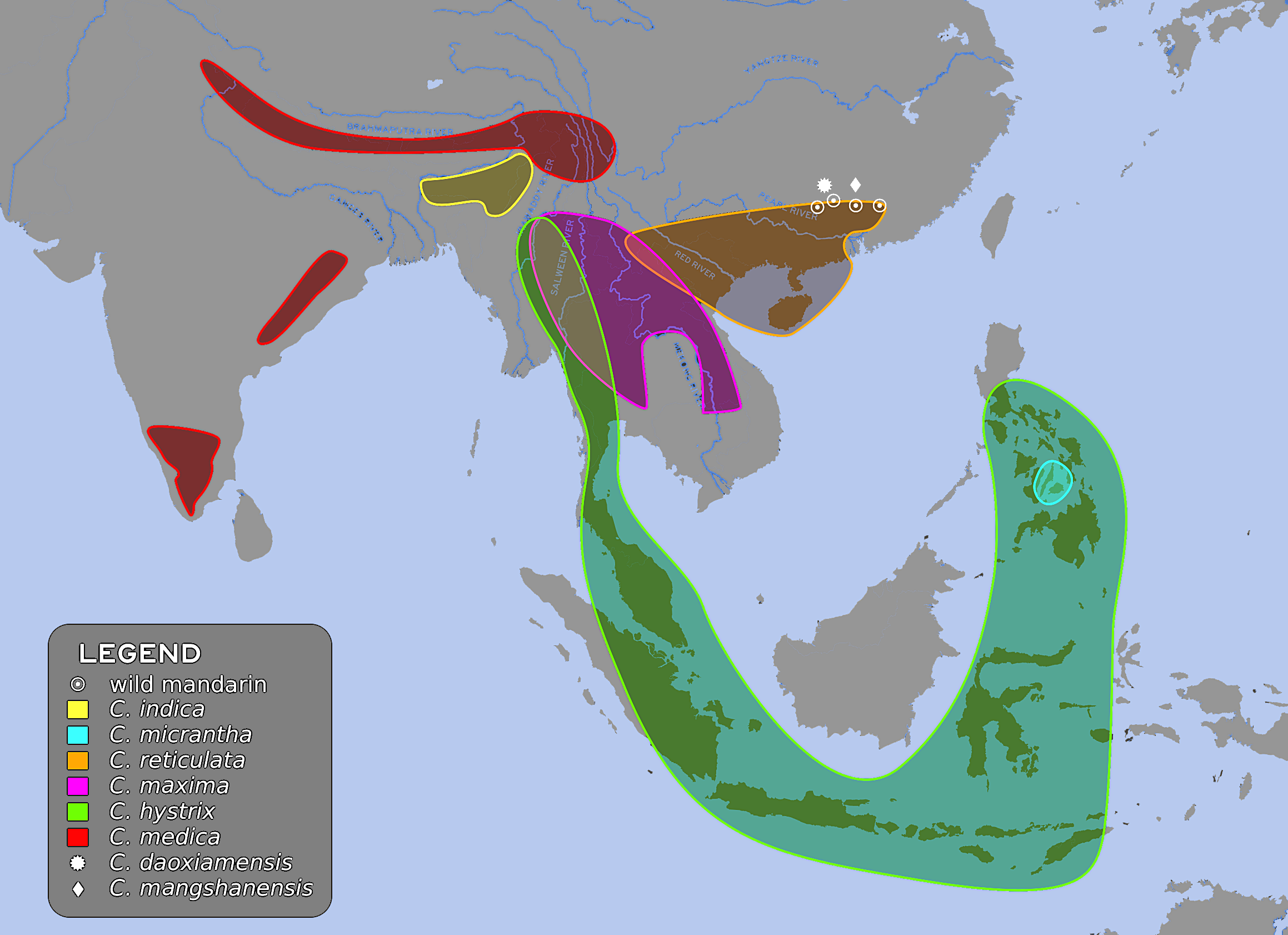
Map of inferred original wild ranges of the main Citrus cultivars, and selected relevant wild taxa

The citron is an old and original citrus species.

There is molecular evidence that most cultivated citrus species arose by hybridization of a small number of ancestral types: the citron, pomelo, mandarin and, to a lesser extent, papedas and kumquat. The citron is usually fertilized by self-pollination, which results in them displaying a high degree of genetic homozygosity. It is the male parent of any citrus hybrid rather than a female one.

Archaeological evidence for citrus fruits has been limited, as neither seeds nor pollen are likely to be routinely recovered in archaeology. The citron is thought to have been native to the southeast foothills of the Himalayas. Despite its scientific designation, which is an adaptation of the old name in classical Greek sources “Median pome”, this fruit was not indigenous to Media or ancient Media; it was mostly cultivated on shores of the Caspian Sea (north of Mazandarn and Gilan) on its way to the Mediterranean basin, where it was cultivated during the later centuries in different areas as described by Erich Isaac. Many mention the role of Alexander the Great and his armies as they attacked Iran and what is today Pakistan, as being responsible for the spread of the citron westward, reaching the European countries such as Greece and Italy.

=== Antiquity ===
Leviticus mentions the "fruit of the beautiful ('hadar') tree" as being required for ritual use during the Feast of Tabernacles (Lev. 23:40). According to Jewish Rabbinical tradition, the "fruit of the tree hadar" refers to the citron. Mishna Sukkah, c. 2nd century AD, deals with halakhic aspects of the citron.

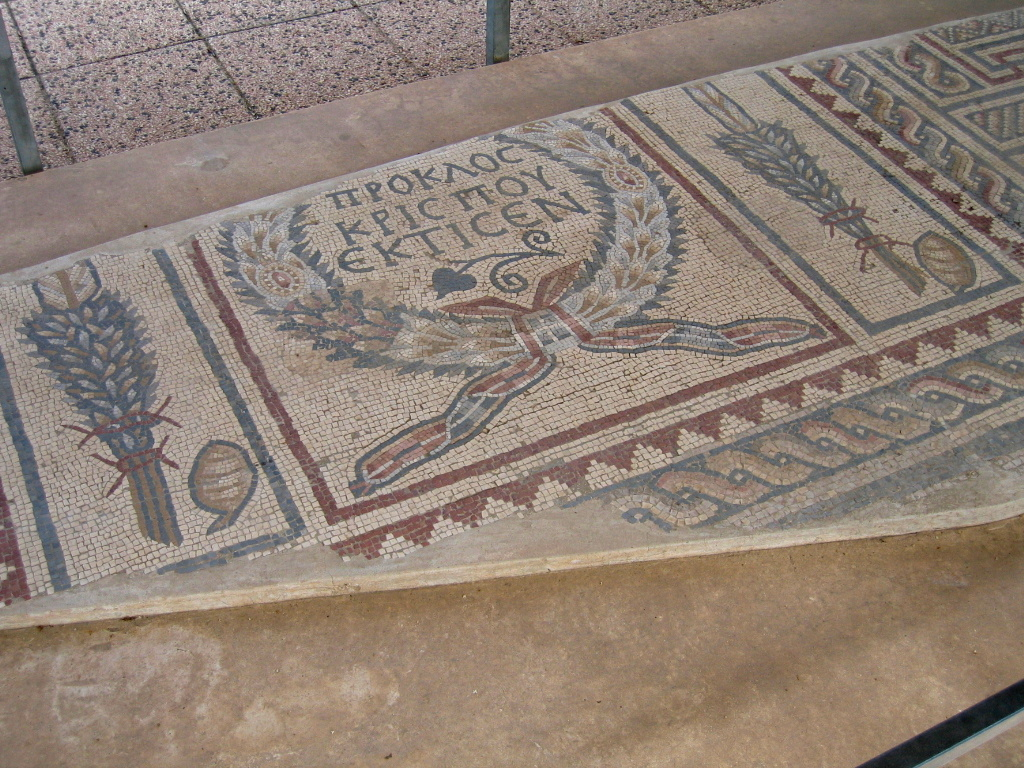
Ancient mosaic of Tiberian Synagogue depicting citrons

The Egyptologist and archaeologist Victor Loret said he had identified it depicted on the walls of the botanical garden at the Karnak Temple, which dates back to the time of Thutmosis III, approximately 3,500 years ago. Citron was also cultivated in Sumer as early as the 3rd millennium BC.

The citron has been cultivated since ancient times, predating the cultivation of other Citrus species.

=== Theophrastus ===
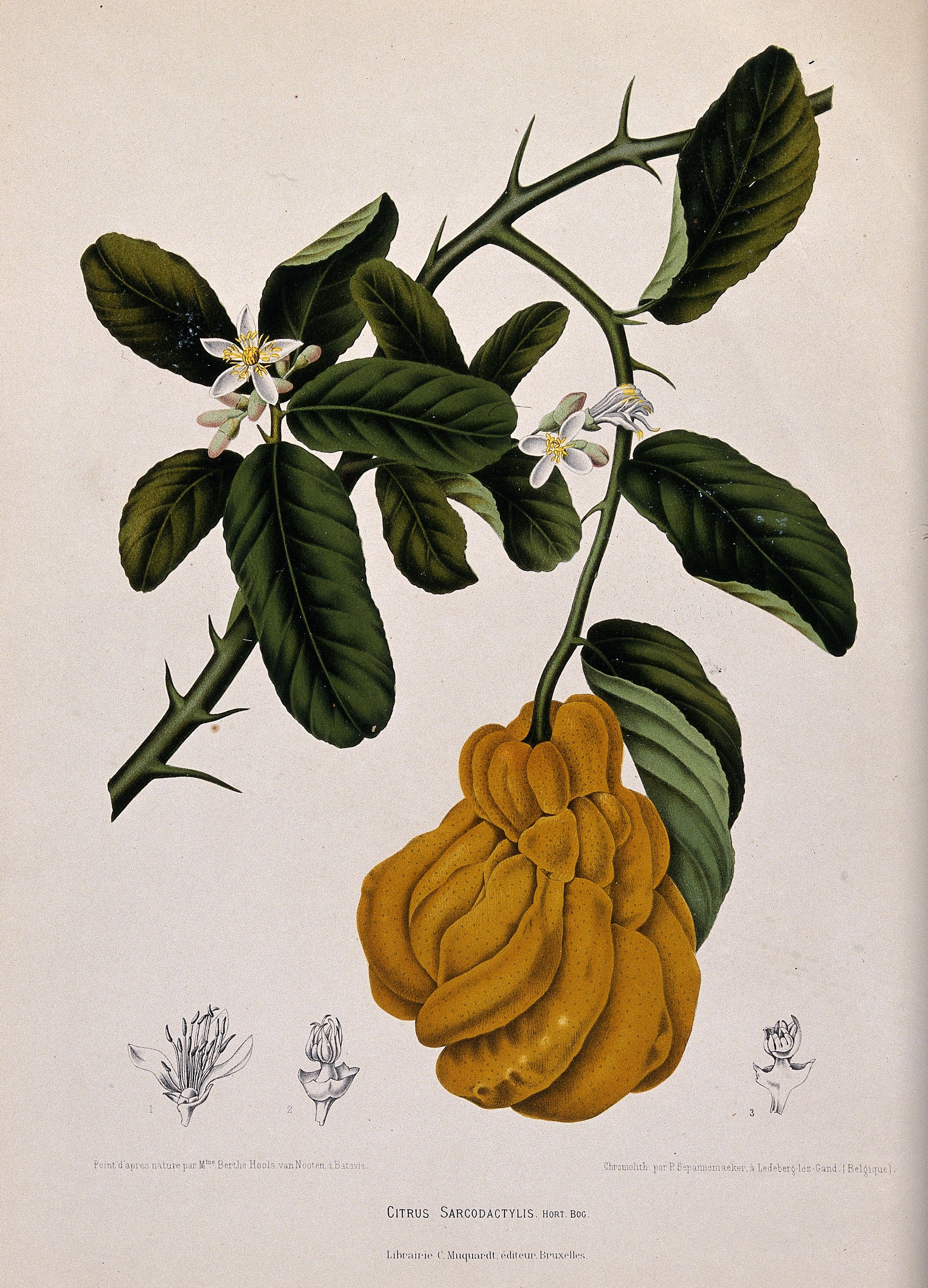
Fingered citron with the leaves and thorns that are common to all varieties of citron. Chromolithograph by P. Depannemaeker, c. 1885, after B. Hoola van Nooten.

The following description on citron was given by Theophrastus

In the east and south there are special plants ... i.e. in Media and Persia there are many types of fruit, between them there is a fruit called Median or Persian Apple. The tree has a leaf similar to and almost identical with that of the andrachn (Arbutus andrachne L.), but has thorns like those of the apios (the wild pear, Pyrus amygdaliformis Vill.) or the firethorn (Cotoneaster pyracantha Spach.), except that they are white, smooth, sharp and strong. The fruit is not eaten, but is very fragrant, as is also the leaf of the tree; and the fruit is put among clothes, it keeps them from being moth-eaten. It is also useful when one has drunk deadly poison, for when it is administered in wine; it upsets the stomach and brings up the poison. It is also useful to improve the breath, for if one boils the inner part of the fruit in a dish or squeezes it into the mouth in some other medium, it makes the breath more pleasant.

The seed is removed from the fruit and sown in the spring in carefully tilled beds, and it is watered every fourth or fifth day. As soon the plant is strong it is transplanted, also in the spring, to a soft, well watered site, where the soil is not very fine, for it prefers such places.

And it bears its fruit at all seasons, for when some have gathered, the flower of the others is on the tree and is ripening others. Of the flowers I have said those that have a sort of distaff [meaning the pistil] projecting from the middle are fertile, while those that do not have this are sterile. It is also sown, like date palms, in pots punctured with holes.

This tree, as has been remarked, grows in Media and Persia.

=== Pliny the Elder ===
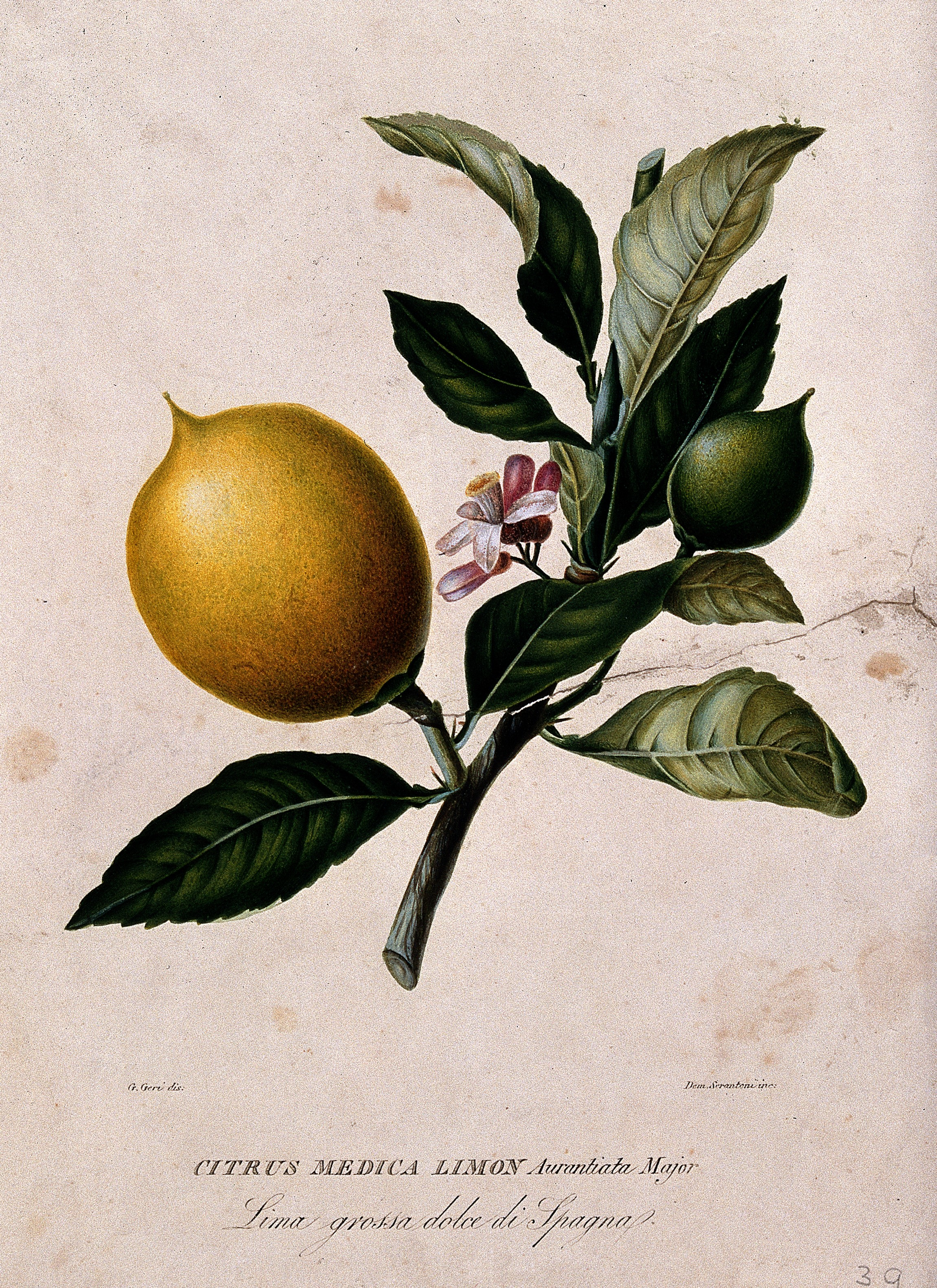
Citron (Citrus medica L.); flowering and fruiting stem. Coloured aquatint by G. Geri, c. 1825, after D. Serantoni.

The citron was described by Pliny the Elder, who called it nata Assyria malus. The following is from his book Natural History:

There is another tree also with the same name of "citrus", and bears a fruit that is held by some persons in particular dislike for its smell and remarkable bitterness; while, on the other hand, there are some who esteem it very highly. This tree is used as an ornament to houses; it requires, however, no further description.

The citron tree, called the Assyrian, and by some the Median or Persian apple, is an antidote against poisons. The leaf is similar to that of the arbute, except that it has small prickles running across it. As to the fruit, it is never eaten, but it is remarkable for its extremely powerful smell, which is the case, also, with the leaves; indeed, the odour is so strong, that it will penetrate clothes, when they are once impregnated with it, and hence it is very useful in repelling the attacks of noxious insects.

The tree bears fruit at all seasons of the year; while some is falling off, other fruit is ripening, and other, again, just bursting into birth. Various nations have attempted to naturalize this tree among them, for the sake of its medica or Persian properties, by planting it in pots of clay, with holes drilled in them, for the purpose of introducing the air to the roots; and I would here remark, once for all, that it is as well to remember that the best plan is to pack all slips of trees that have to be carried to any distance, as close together as they can possibly be placed.

It has been found, however, that this tree will grow nowhere except in Persia. It is this fruit, the pips of which, as we have already mentioned, the Parthian grandees employ in seasoning their ragouts, as being peculiarly conducive to the sweetening of the breath. We find no other tree very highly commended that is produced in Media.

Citrons, either the pulp of them or the pips, are taken in wine as an antidote to poisons. A decoction of citrons, or the juice extracted from them, is used as a gargle to impart sweetness to the breath. The pips of this fruit are recommended for pregnant women to chew when affected with qualmishness. Citrons are good, also, for a weak stomach, but it is not easy to eat them except with vinegar.

=== Medieval authors ===
Ibn al-'Awwam's 12th-century agricultural encyclopedia, Book on Agriculture, contains an article on citron tree cultivation in Spain.

== Description and variation ==
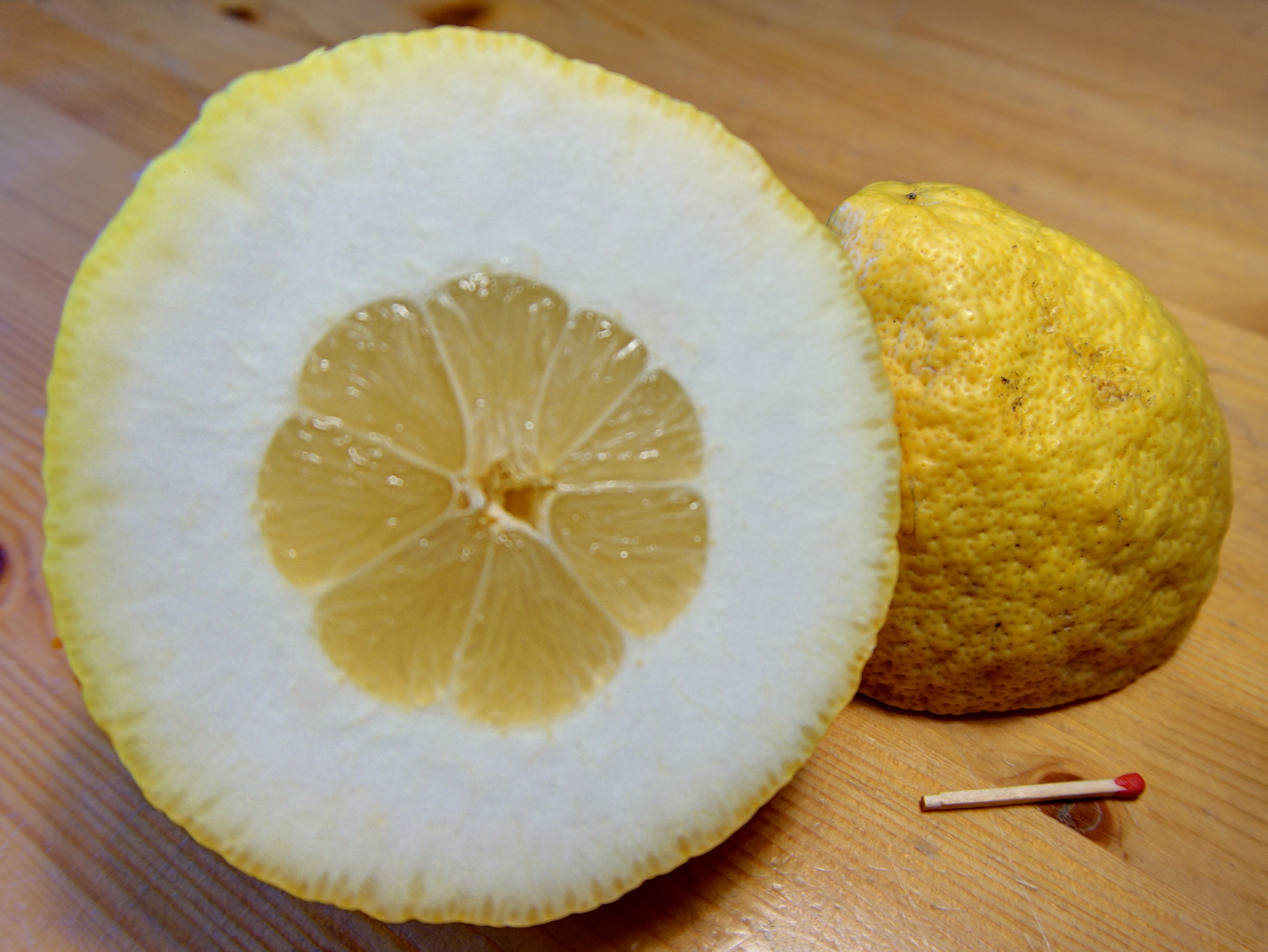
A citron or citron-like hybrid of Italian origin, showing the thick rind

=== Fruit ===
The citron fruit is usually ovate or oblong, narrowing towards the stylar end. However, the citron's fruit shape is highly variable, due to the large quantity of albedo, which forms independently according to the fruits' position on the tree, twig orientation, and many other factors. The rind is leathery, furrowed, and adherent. The inner portion is thick, white and hard; the outer is uniformly thin and very fragrant. The pulp is usually acidic, but also can be sweet, and some varieties are entirely pulpless.

Most citron varieties contain a large number of monoembryonic seeds. The seeds are white with dark inner coats and red-purplish chalazal spots for the acidic varieties, and colorless for the sweet ones. Some citron varieties have persistent styles which do not fall off after fecundation. Those are usually preferred for ritual etrog use in Judaism.

Some citrons have medium-sized oil bubbles at the outer surface, medially distant to each other. Some varieties are ribbed and faintly warted on the outer surface. A fingered citron variety is commonly called Buddha's hand.

The color varies from green, when unripe, to a yellow-orange when overripe. The citron does not fall off the tree and can reach 8–10 pounds (3.6–4.5 kg) if not picked before fully mature. However, they should be picked before the winter, as the branches might bend or break to the ground, and may cause numerous fungal diseases for the tree.

Despite the wide variety of forms taken on by the fruit, citrons are all closely related genetically, representing a single species. Genetic analysis divides the known cultivars into three clusters: a Mediterranean cluster thought to have originated in India, and two clusters predominantly found in China, one representing the fingered citrons, and another consisting of non-fingered varieties.

=== Plant ===
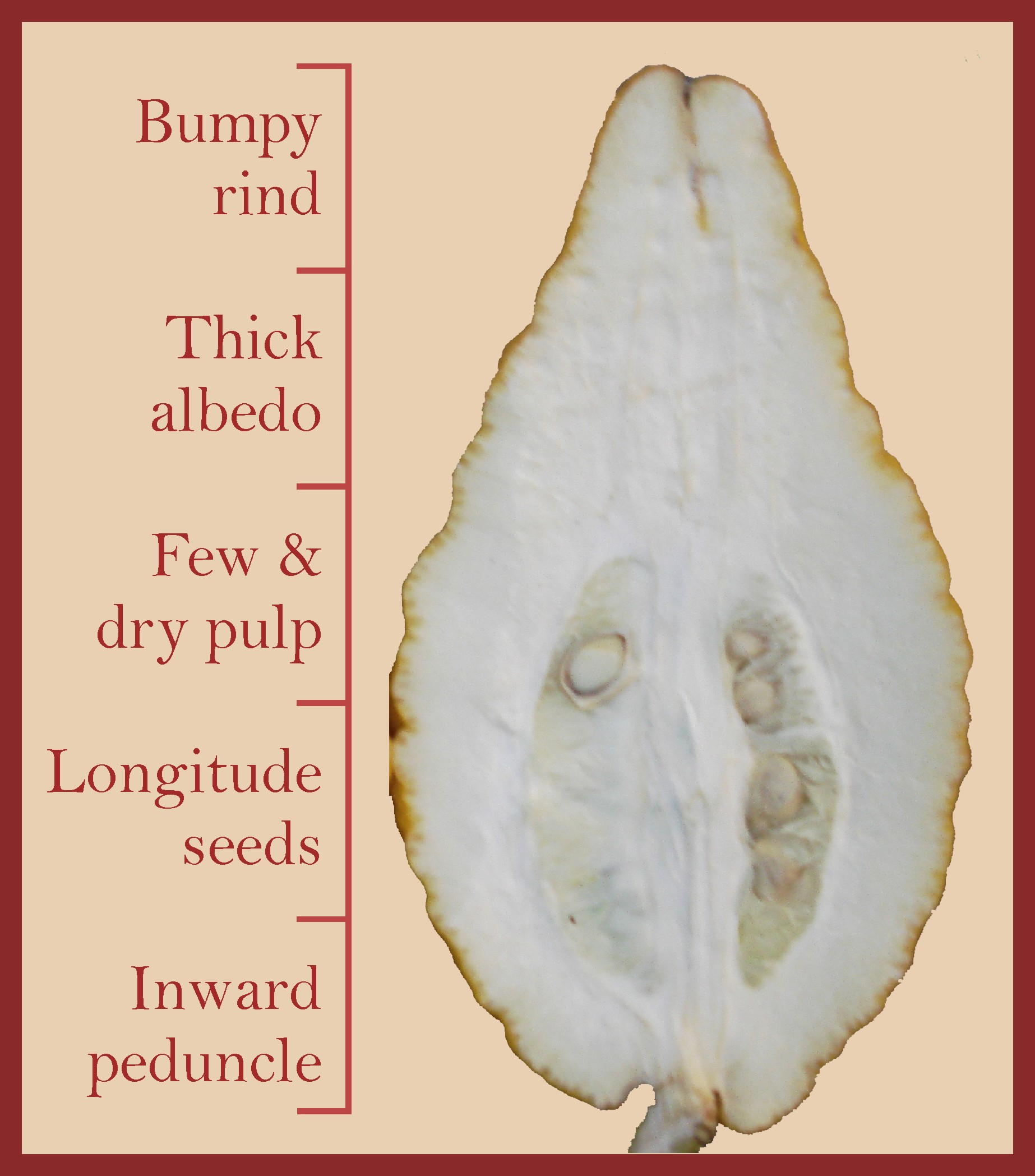
A pure citron of any kind has a large portion of albedo, which is important for the production of succade.

Citrus medica is a slow-growing shrub or small tree that reaches a height of about 2.5 to 4.5 metres (8 to 15 feet). It has irregular straggling branches and stiff twigs and long spines at the leaf axils. The evergreen leaves are green and lemon-scented with slightly serrate edges, ovate-lanceolate or ovate elliptic 60 to 180 millimetres (2 1/2–7 in) long. Petioles are usually wingless or with minor wings. The clustered flowers of the acidic varieties are purplish tinted from outside, but the sweet ones are white-yellowish.

The citron tree is very vigorous with almost no dormancy, blooming several times a year, and is therefore fragile and extremely sensitive to frost.

=== Varieties and hybrids ===
The acidic varieties include the Florentine and Diamante citron from Italy, the Greek citron and the Balady citron from Israel. The sweet varieties include the Corsican and Moroccan citrons. The pulpless varieties also include some fingered varieties and the Yemenite citron.

There are also a number of citron hybrids; for example, ponderosa lemon, the lumia and rhobs el Arsa are known citron hybrids. Some claim that even the Florentine citron is not pure citron, but a citron hybrid.

== Uses ==
=== Culinary ===
While the lemon and orange are primarily peeled to consume their pulpy and juicy segments, the citron's pulp is dry, containing a small quantity of juice, if any. The main content of a citron fruit is its thick white rind, which adheres to the segments and cannot easily be separated from them. The citron gets halved and depulped, then its rind (the thicker the better) is cut into pieces. Those are cooked in sugar syrup and used as a spoon sweet known in Greek as "kítro glykó" (κίτρο γλυκό), or diced and candied with sugar and used as a confection in cakes. In Italy, a soft drink called "Cedrata" is made from the fruit as well as a dense and powerful citron liqueur called “cedro” or “cedrello”.

In Samoa a refreshing drink called "vai tipolo" is made from squeezed juice. It is also added to a raw fish dish called "oka" and to a variation of palusami or luáu.

Citron is a regularly used item in Asian cuisine.

Today the citron is also used for the fragrance or zest of its flavedo, but the most important part is still the inner rind (known as pith or albedo), which is a fairly important article in international trade and is widely employed in the food industry as succade, as it is known when it is candied in sugar.

The dozens of varieties of citron are collectively known as Lebu in Bangladesh, West Bengal, where it is the primary citrus fruit.

In Iran the citron's thick white rind is used to make jam; in Pakistan the fruit is used to make jam but is also pickled; in South Indian cuisine, some varieties of citron (collectively referred to as "Narthangai" in Tamil and "Heralikayi" in Kannada) are widely used in pickles and preserves. In Karnataka, heralikayi (citron) is used to make lemon rice. In Kutch, Gujarat, it is used to make pickle, wherein entire slices of fruits are salted, dried and mixed with jaggery and spices to make sweet spicy pickle. In the United States, citron is an important ingredient in holiday fruitcakes.

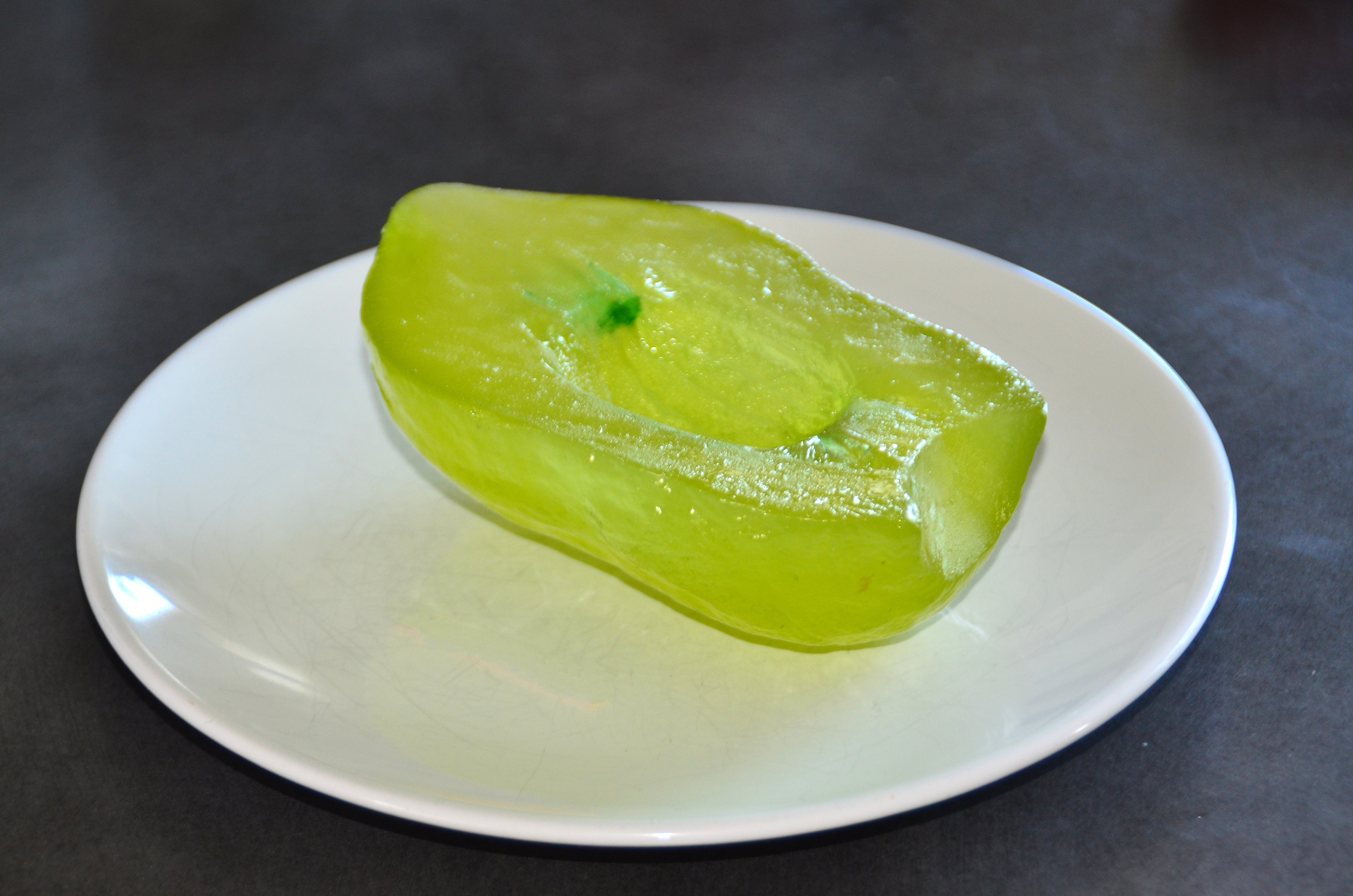
A citron halved and depulped, cooked in sugar

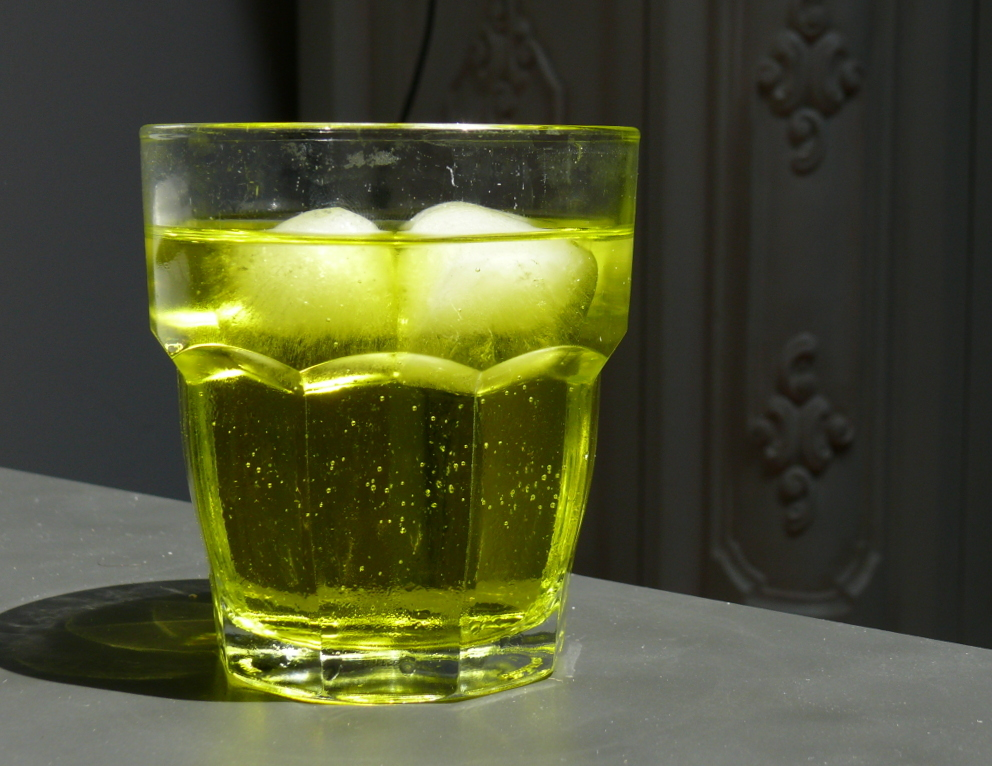
Cedrata, a citron soft drink from Italy

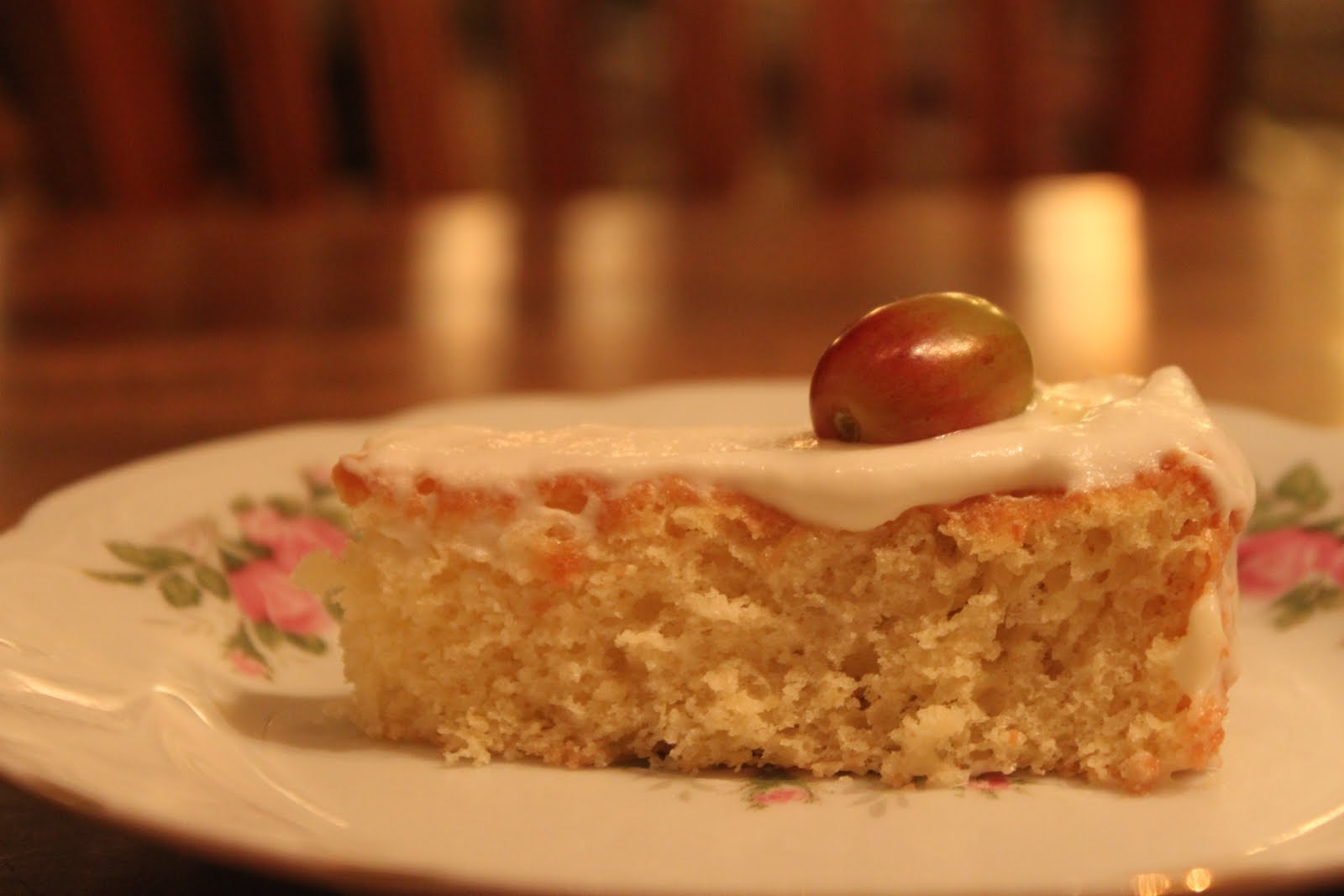
Citron torte

=== Medicine ===
From ancient through medieval times, the citron was used mainly for supposed medical purposes to combat seasickness, scurvy and other disorders. Pietro Andrea Mattioli's Commentaries (1544) recommended using the essential oil of citrons to preserve dead bodies and suggested using it as a contraceptive.

Citron and its bioactive phytochemicals have demonstrated activity against various pathogenic microorganisms. The juice of the citron has a high content of vitamin C and dietary fiber (pectin) which can be extracted from the thick albedo of the citron.

=== Religious ===
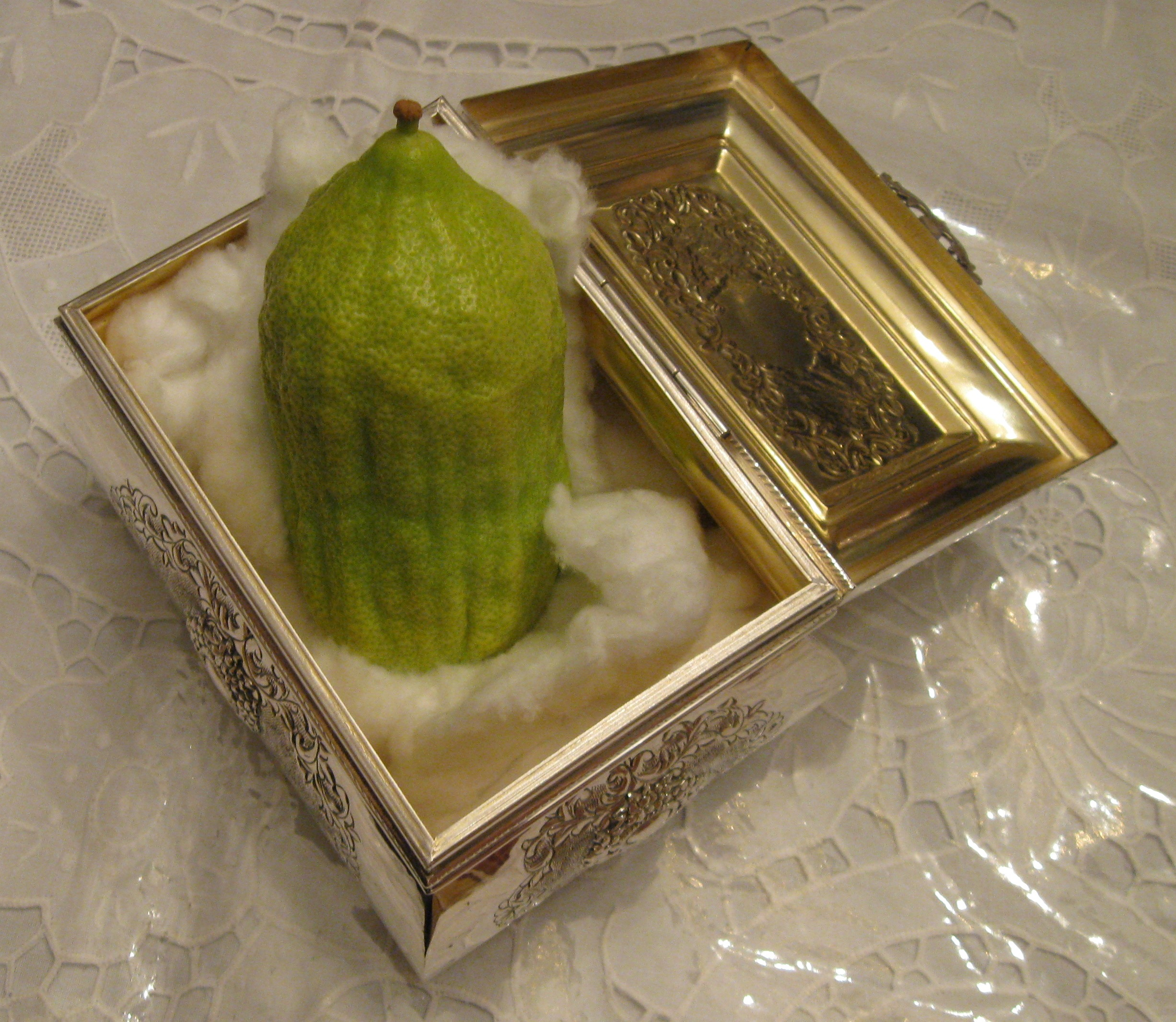
A citron in an ornamental box, to be carried during Sukkot

==== In Judaism ====
The citron (the word for which in Hebrew is etrog) is used by Jews for a religious ritual during the Jewish harvest holiday of Sukkot, the Feast of Tabernacles; therefore, it is considered to be a Jewish symbol, one found on various Hebrew antiques and archaeological findings.

==== In Buddhism ====
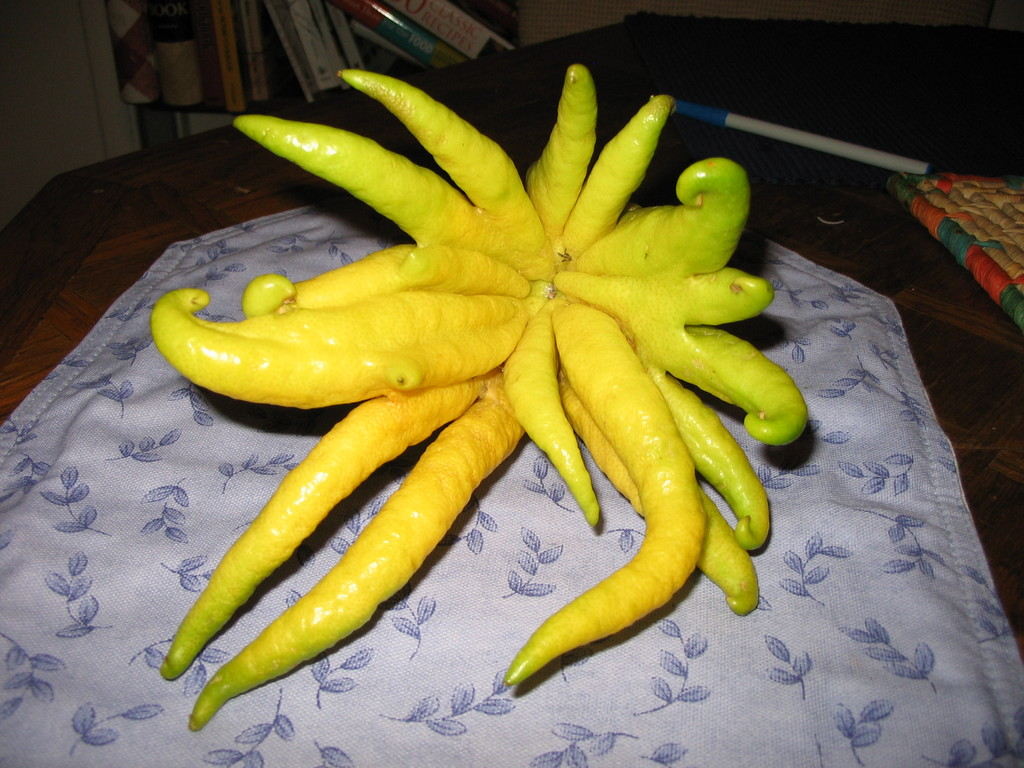
Buddha's hand (fingered citron)

A variety of citron native to China, the Buddha's hand or fingered citron, has sections that separate into finger-like parts and is used as an offering in Buddhist temples.

==== In Hinduism ====
In Nepal, the citron (Nepali: बिमिरो, romanized: bimiro) is worshipped during the Bhai Tika ceremony during Tihar. The worship is thought to stem from the belief that it is a favorite of Yama, Hindu god of death, and his sister Yami. The goddess Mahalakshmi carries a citron in one of her four hands.

=== Perfumery ===
For many centuries, citron's fragrant essential oil (oil of cedrate) has been used in perfumery, the same oil that was used medicinally for its antibiotic properties. Its major constituent is limonene.

== Gallery ==
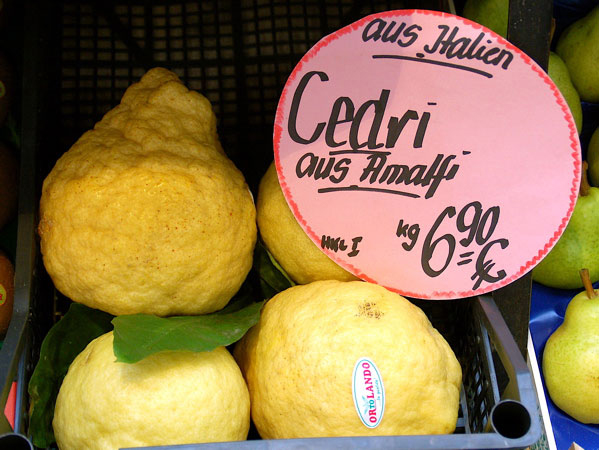
In a German market, for culinary use

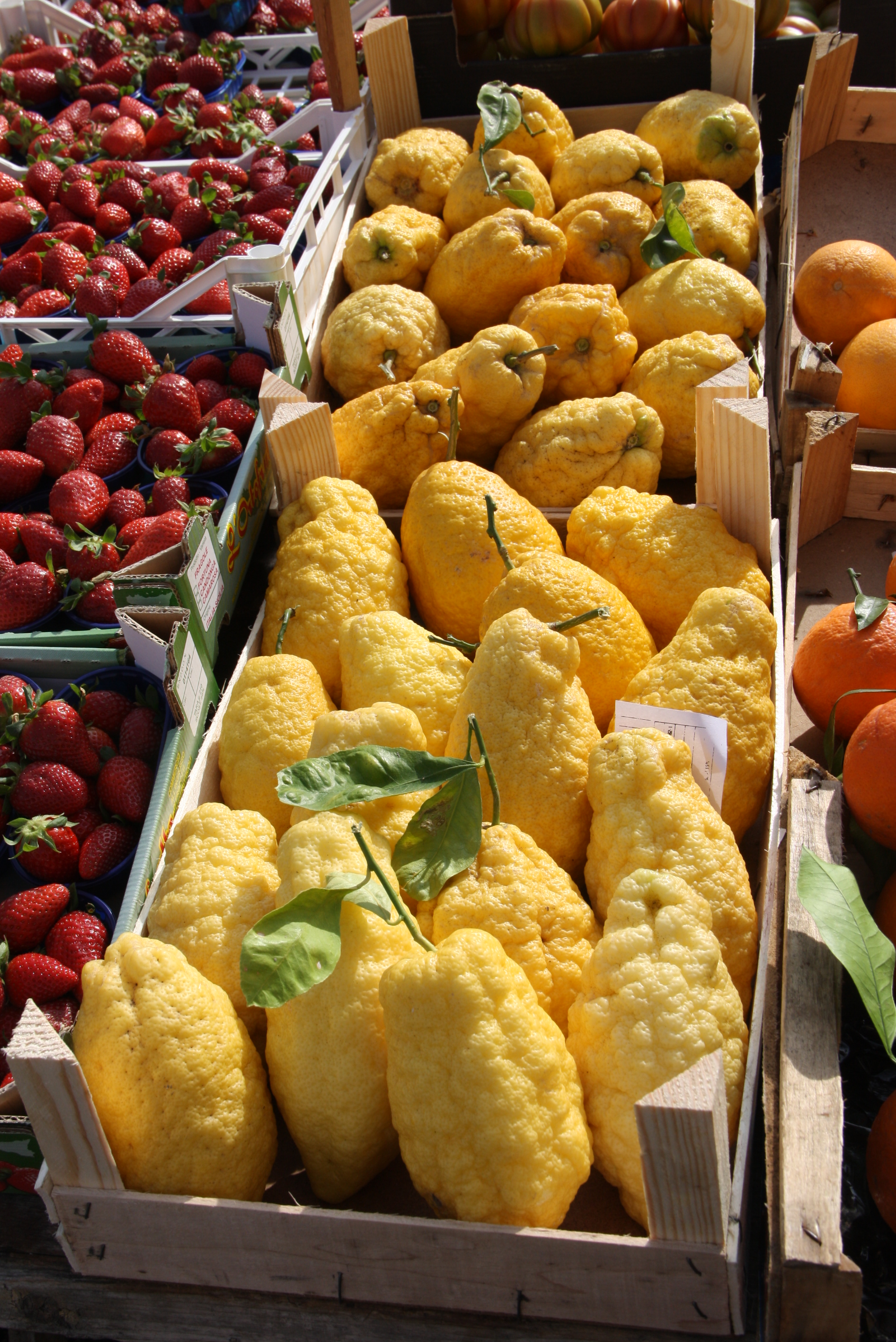
In fruit market of Italy

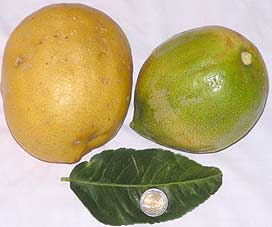
Naxos citrons and leaf

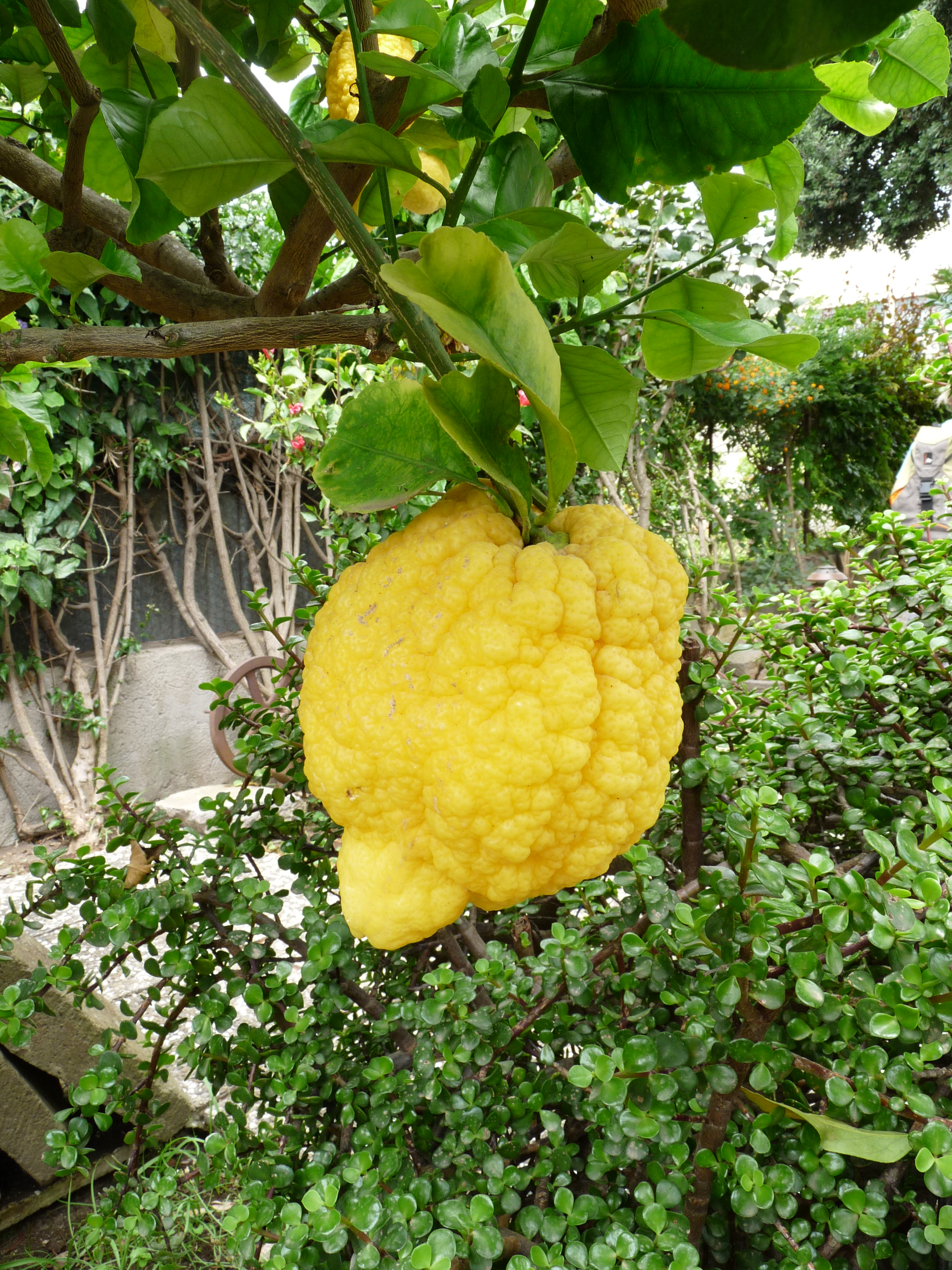
Citron or hybrid in Sicily

A wild citron in India

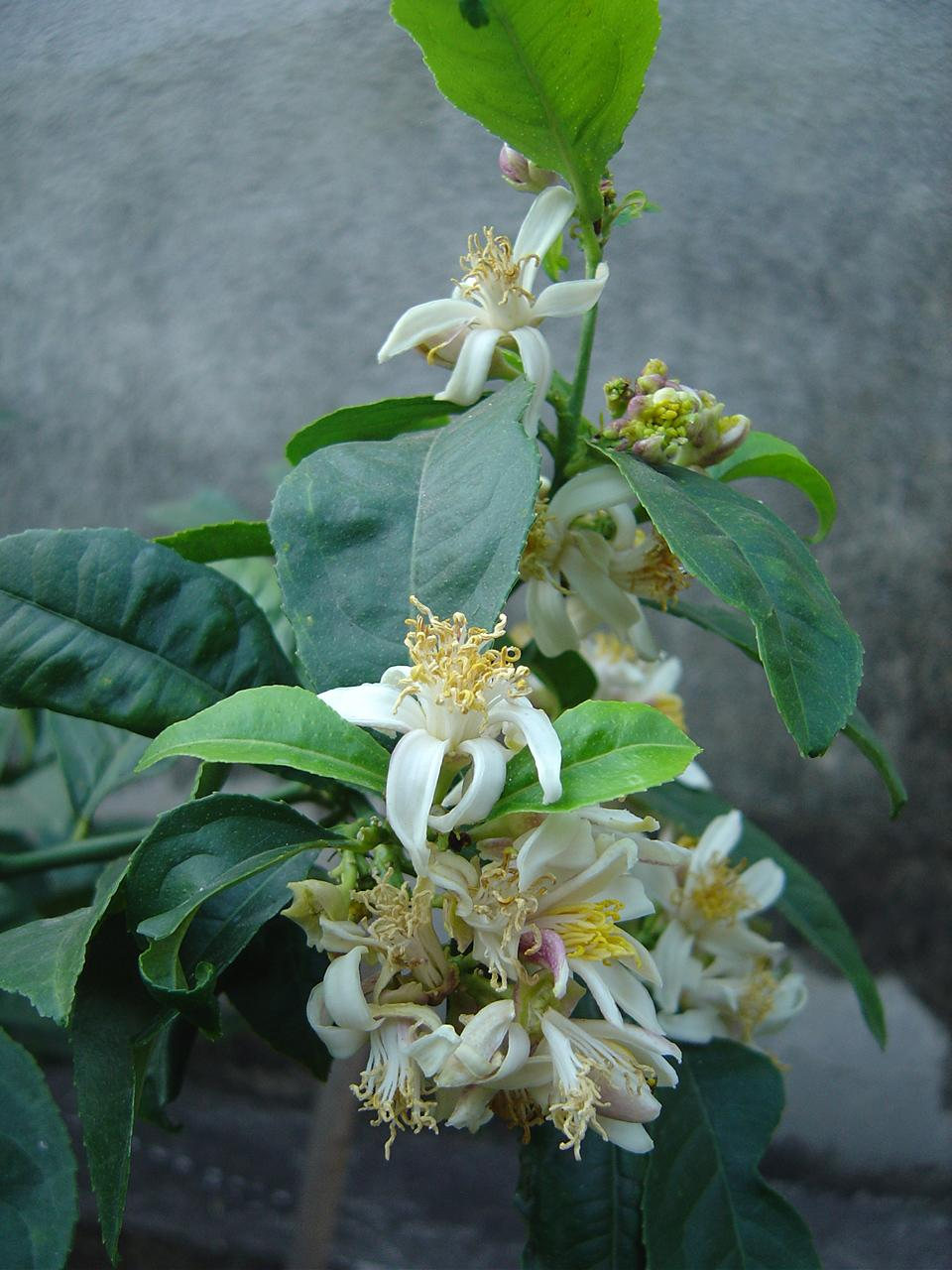
Citron flowers

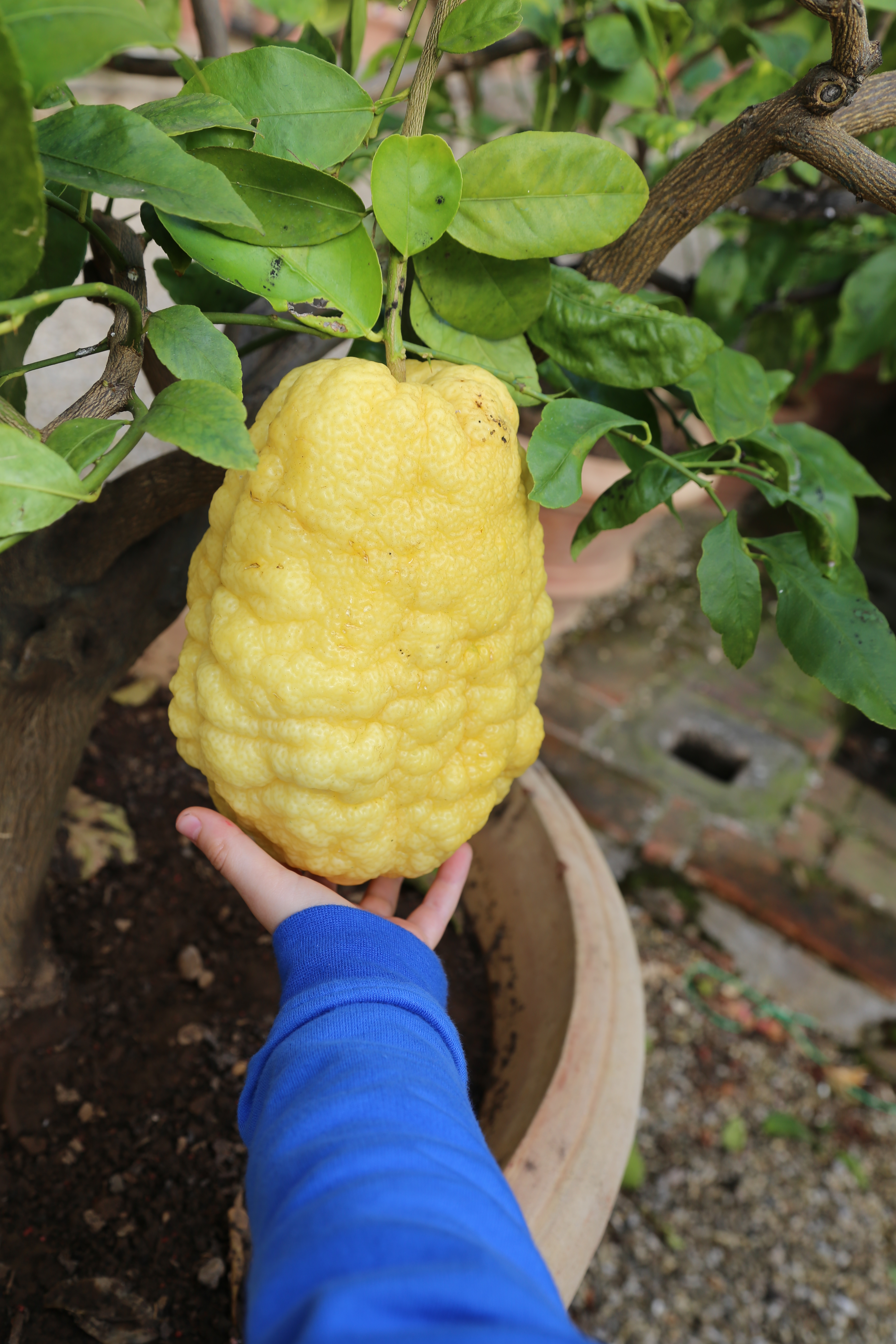
Unknown citron type in pot

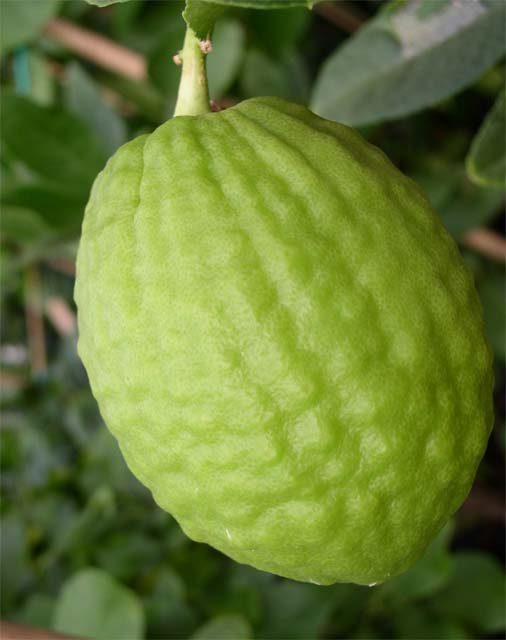
A Corsican citron

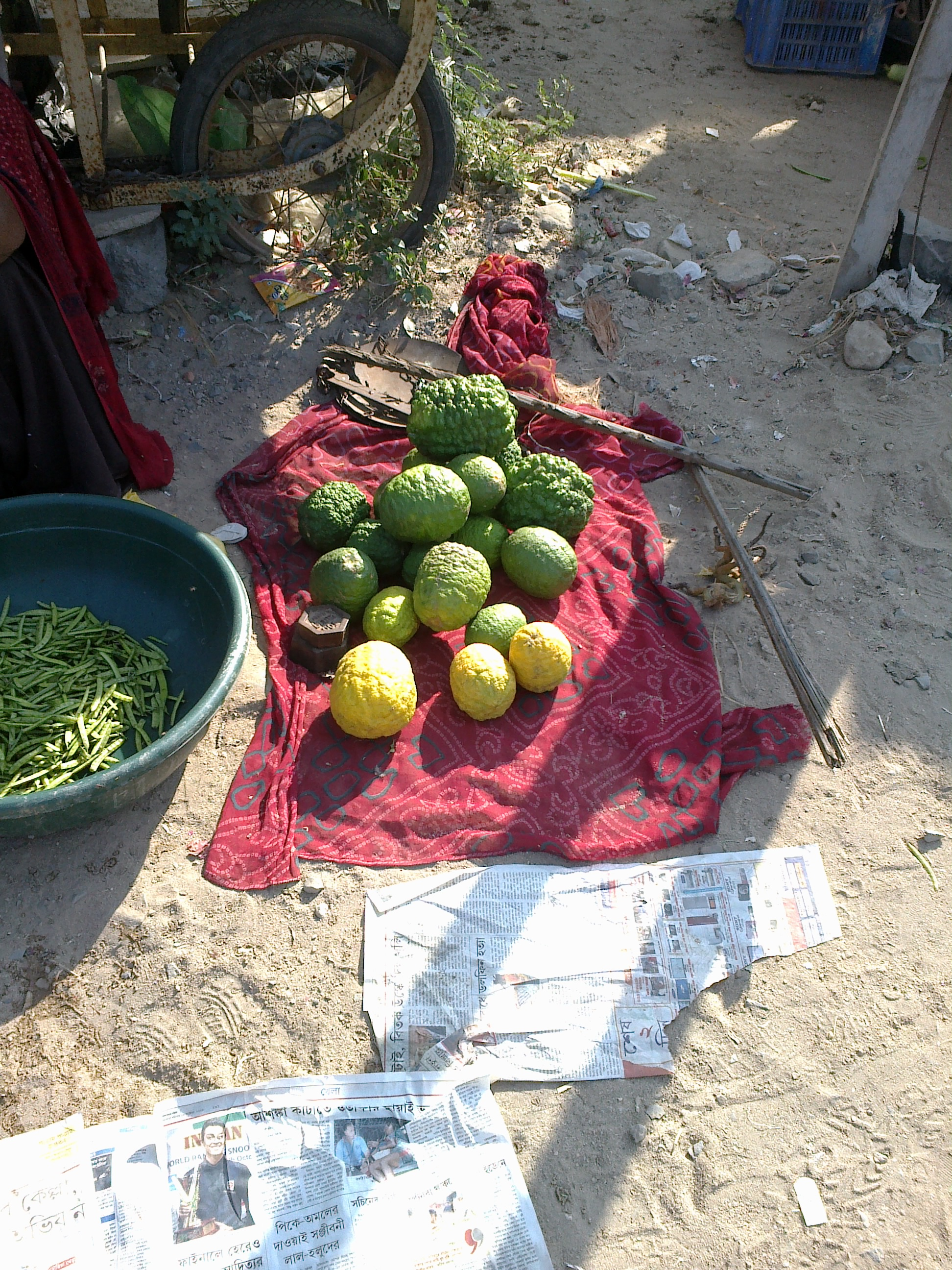
Bijora - Citron fruit for sale at Bhujpur, Kutch, Gujarat, India

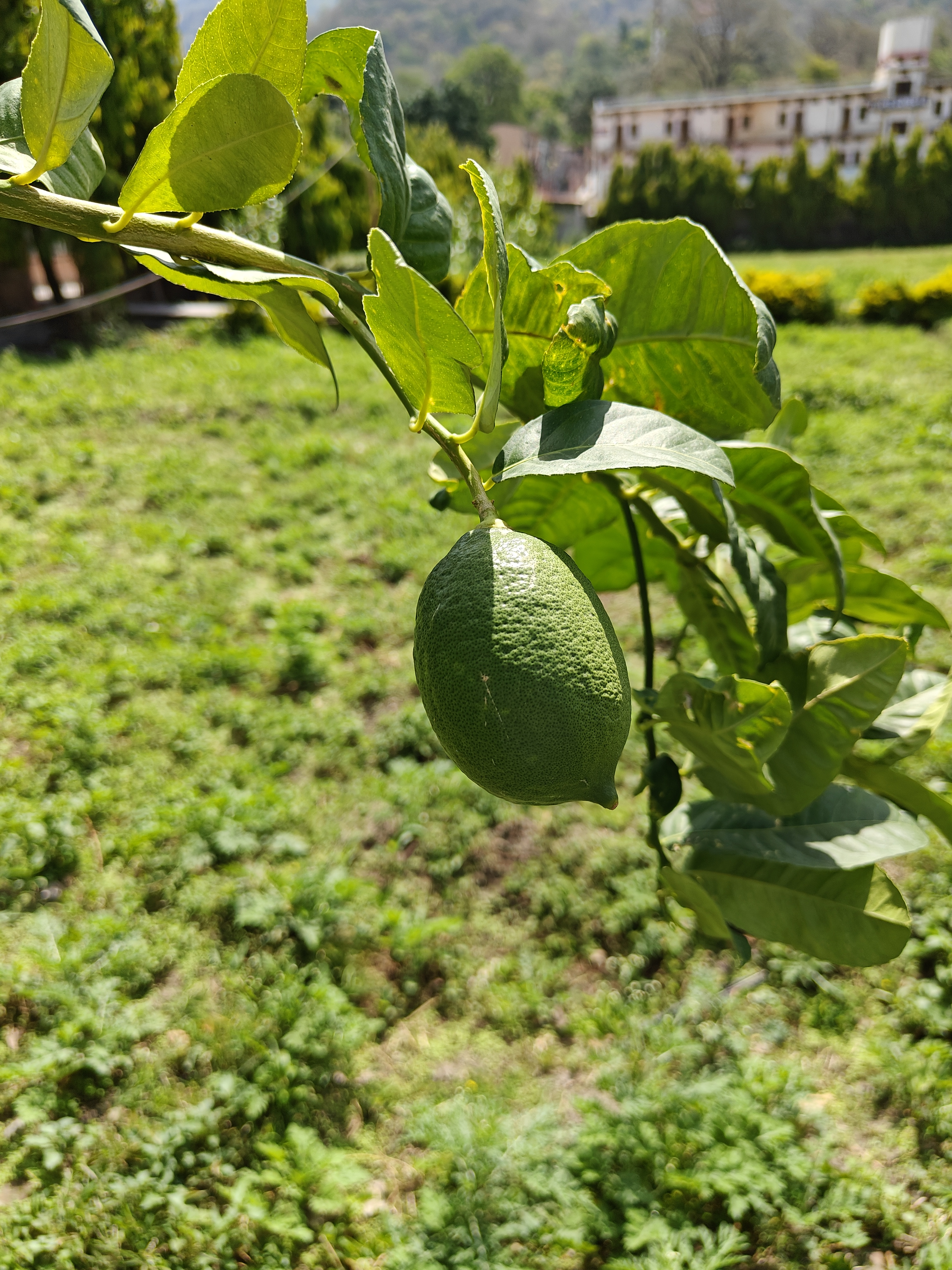
Citron growing in Uttarakhand,
