= L Corps =

L Corps or 50th Corps may refer to:

- L Army Corps (Wehrmacht), Germany
- 50th Army Corps (Russian Empire)
- 50th Rifle Corps, Soviet Union
- 50th (1st Press Corps) Lanarkshire Rifle Volunteer Corps, United Kingdom

== See also ==
- List of military corps by number
- 50th Army (disambiguation)
- 50th Brigade (disambiguation)
- 50th Division (disambiguation)
- 50th Regiment (disambiguation)
- 50th Squadron (disambiguation)
- 50th (disambiguation)
- L (disambiguation)
