= Hawaii Five-O =

Hawaii Five-O or Hawaii Five-0 may refer to:

- Hawaii Five-0 (2010 TV series), an American action police procedural television series
- Hawaii Five-O (1968 TV series), an American police procedural drama series produced by CBS Productions
- Hawaii Five-O (album), an instrumental album by the Ventures

== See also ==
- Five-O (disambiguation)
- 5O (disambiguation)
- 50 (disambiguation)
