= 50th =

50th is the ordinal form of the number 50. 50th or Fiftieth may also refer to:

- A fraction, 1/50, equal to one of 50 equal parts
- 50th anniversary, also known as a Golden jubilee

== Geography ==
- 50th meridian east, a line of longitude
- 50th meridian west, a line of longitude
- 50th parallel north, a circle of latitude
- 50th parallel south, a circle of latitude
- 50th Street (disambiguation)

== Military ==
- 50th Army (disambiguation)
- 50th Brigade (disambiguation)
- 50th Division (disambiguation)
- 50th Regiment (disambiguation)
- 50th Squadron (disambiguation)

== Other ==
- 50th century
- 50th century BC

== See also ==
- 50 (disambiguation)
- The Fiftieth Gate, 1997 Australian non-fiction book
