= Fifties (disambiguation) =

Fifties most often refers to the 1950s. Fifties may also refer to:

- 50s, a decade in the First Century AD
- 50s BC
- 1850s
- 2050s
- The Fifties (book), 1993 a history book by David Halberstam

== See also ==
- Fifty dollar bill (disambiguation)
- Fifty pence (disambiguation)
- Fiftieth (disambiguation)
