= 50th Army =

50th Army may refer to:

- 50th Army (People's Republic of China)
- Fiftieth Army (Japan)
- 50th Army (Soviet Union)

== See also ==
- List of armies by number
- 50th Division (disambiguation)
- 50th Brigade (disambiguation)
- 50th Regiment (disambiguation)
- 50th Wing (disambiguation)
- 50th Squadron (disambiguation)
- 50th (disambiguation)
