= Five-O =

Five-O may refer to:

- Five-O, a North American slang term for law enforcement
- Hawaii Five-O (1968 TV series), an American television police drama airing from 1968 to 1980
  - Hawaii Five-O (album), 1969, by The Ventures
  - Hawaii Five-0 (2010 TV series), a re-imagining of the 1968 series premiering in 2010
- Five-O (album), a 1985 Hank Williams Jr. album
- "Five-O" (song), a 2007 single by Elephant Man from the album Let's Get Physical
- "Five-O", a 1993 song by James from the album Laid
- Five-Oh (building), a tall residential tower in Los Angeles, California
- Ninja Five-O, a game for the Nintendo Game Boy Advance, released in 2003
- Five-O (mobile application)
- "Five-O" (Better Call Saul), a 2015 episode of Better Call Saul
- 5-0 grind, a skateboarding trick
- Five-0 or 5.0, Slang for Ford's Mustang GT with a 5.0L V8 house

== See also ==
- 5O (disambiguation)
- O5 (disambiguation)
- 50 (disambiguation)
