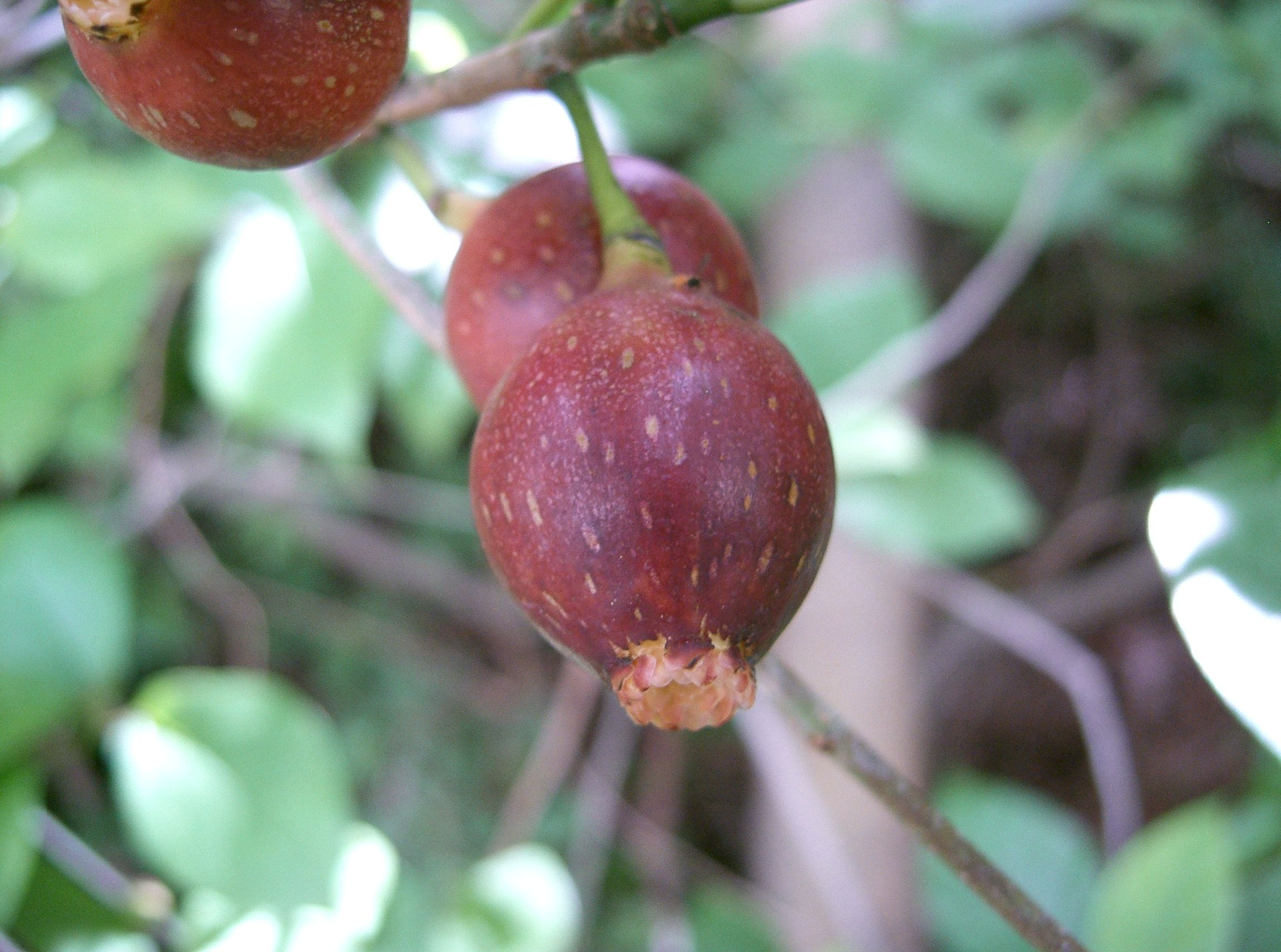
- Fruit
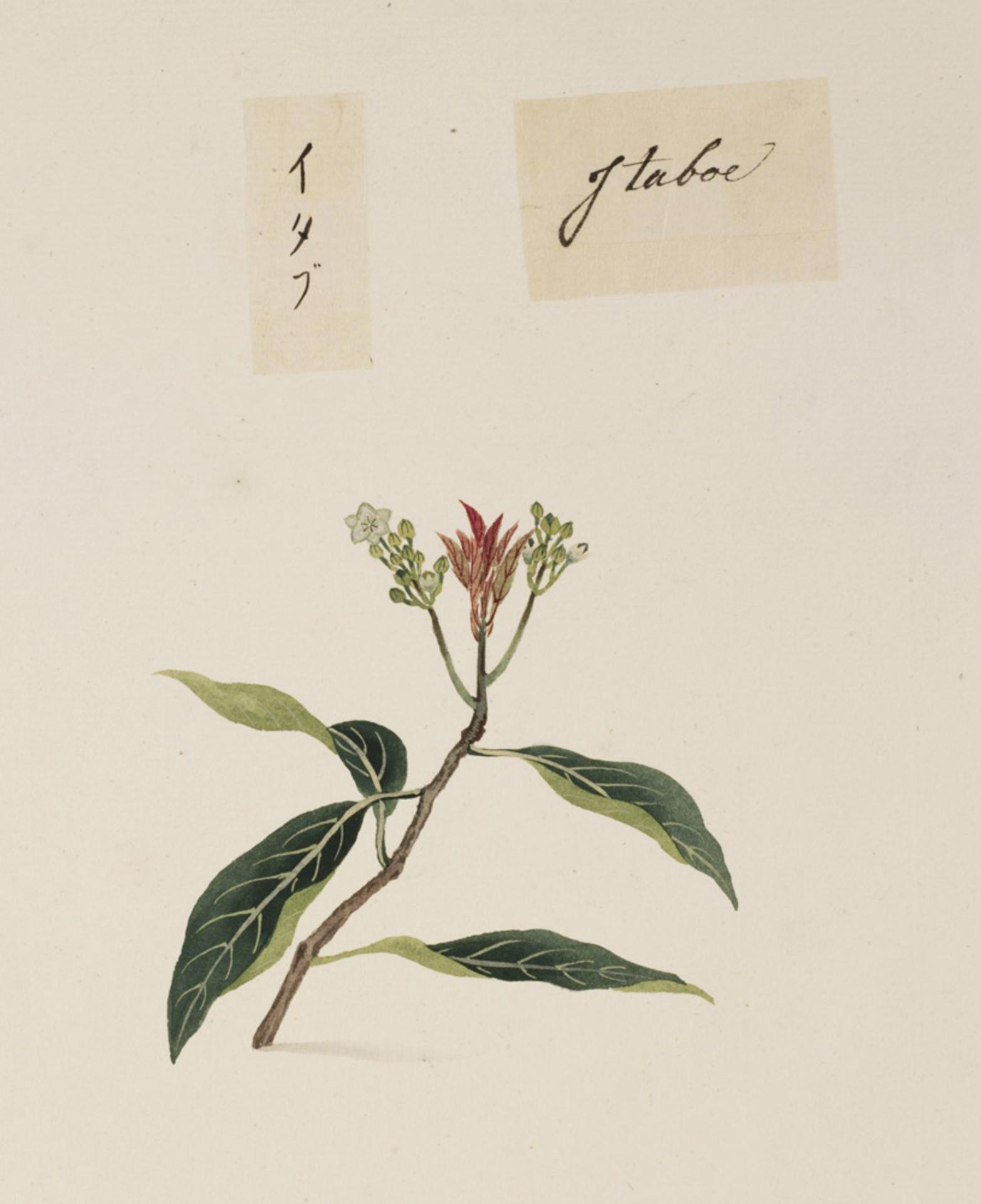
- 1823 illustration by Yūshi Ishizaki

Conservation status
- Least Concern (IUCN 3.1)

Scientific classification
- Kingdom: Plantae
- Clade: Tracheophytes
- Clade: Angiosperms
- Clade: Eudicots
- Clade: Rosids
- Order: Rosales
- Family: Moraceae
- Genus: Ficus
- Species: F. erecta

Binomial name
- Ficus erecta Thunb.

Synonyms
- List: Ficus beecheyana Hook. & Arn.; Ficus beecheyana f. koshunensis (Hayata) Sata; Ficus cornifolia Kunth & C.D.Bouché; Ficus erecta var. beecheyana (Hook. & Arn.) King; Ficus erecta f. koshunensis (Hayata) Corner; Ficus erecta f. sieboldii (Miq.) Corner; Ficus erecta var. sieboldii (Miq.) King; Ficus erecta var. yamadorii Makino ex Ohwi; Ficus japonica Blume; Ficus koshunensis Hayata; Ficus maruyamensis Hayata; Ficus pseudopyriformis H.Lév. & Vaniot; Ficus pumila Thunb.; Ficus sieboldii Miq.; Ficus taquetii H.Lév. & Vaniot; Ficus tenax Blume

= Ficus erecta =

Species of plant

Ficus erecta (syn. Ficus beecheyana), the Japanese fig, is a species of flowering plant in the family Moraceae. It is found in the eastern Himalayas, Assam, Bangladesh, Vietnam, southern China, Taiwan, Jeju Island of South Korea, the Ryukyu Islands, and Japan. The species is a deciduous (or semideciduous) shrub or small tree, growing to a height of 2 to 7 m (7 to 23 ft), it is found alongside streams. It is reported to be dioecious, and produces small, sweet fruits that are 1.0 to 2.5 cm (0.4 to 1.0 in) in diameter. It is pollinated by the fig wasp Blastophaga nipponica.

== Uses ==
The fruit is eaten by local people. Its bark fibre can be used to make paper, and it is occasionally planted as an ornamental tree. It is highly resistant to Ceratocystis fimbriata, which causes Ceratocystis canker in the common fig Ficus carica, so its genome has been sequenced to aid in the breeding of resistant strains of F. carica.

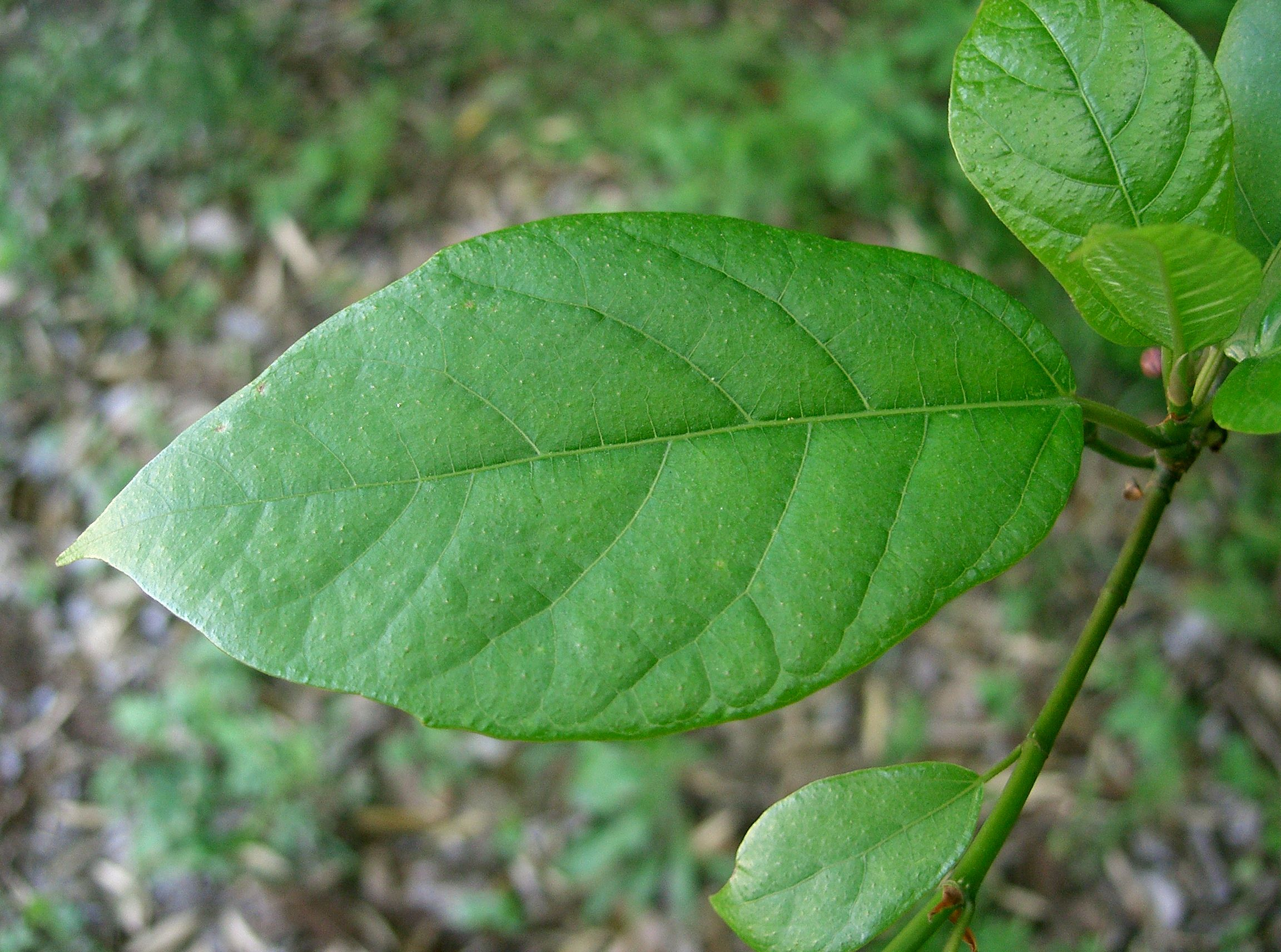
Leaf surface

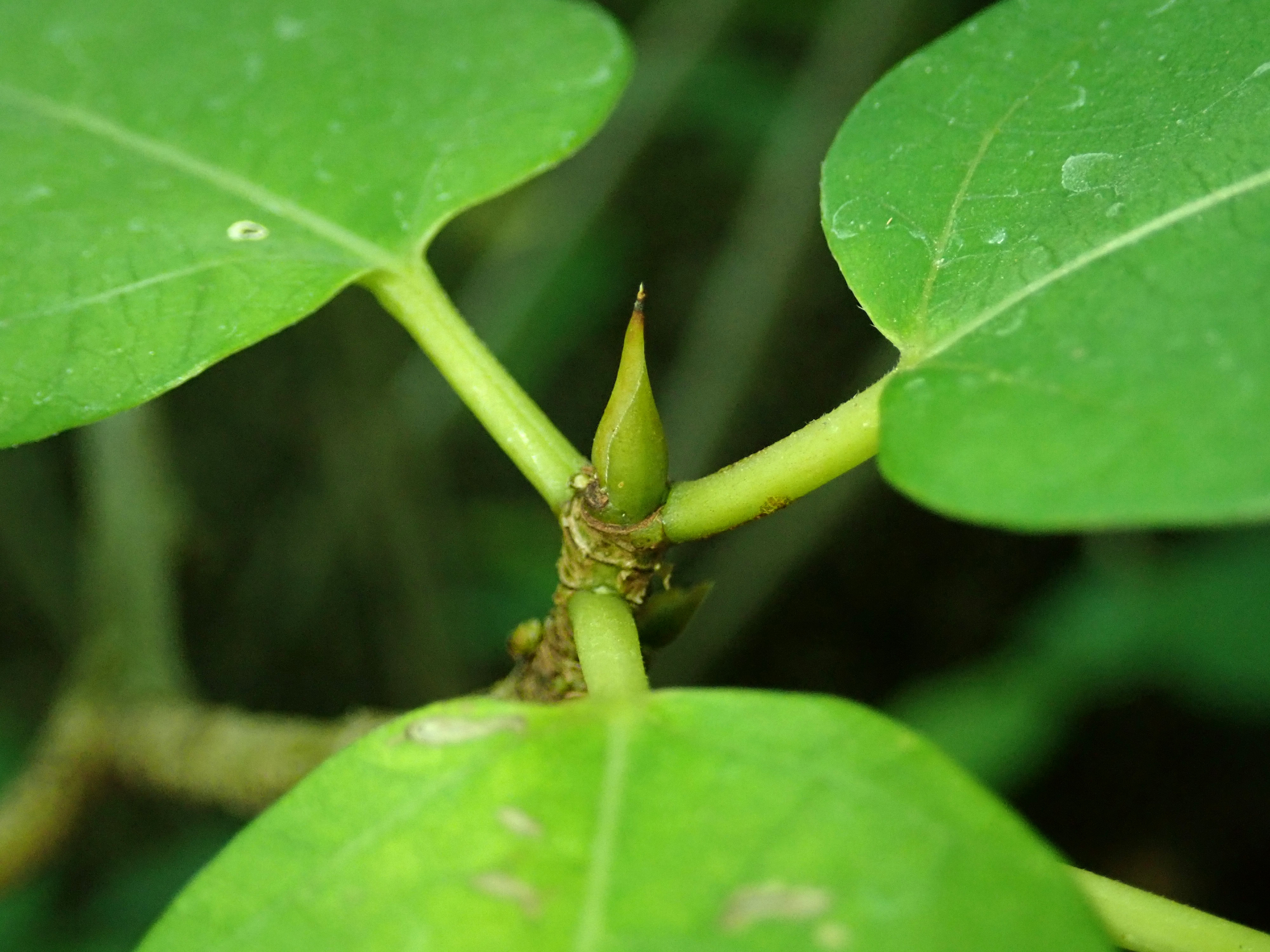
Close up of bud

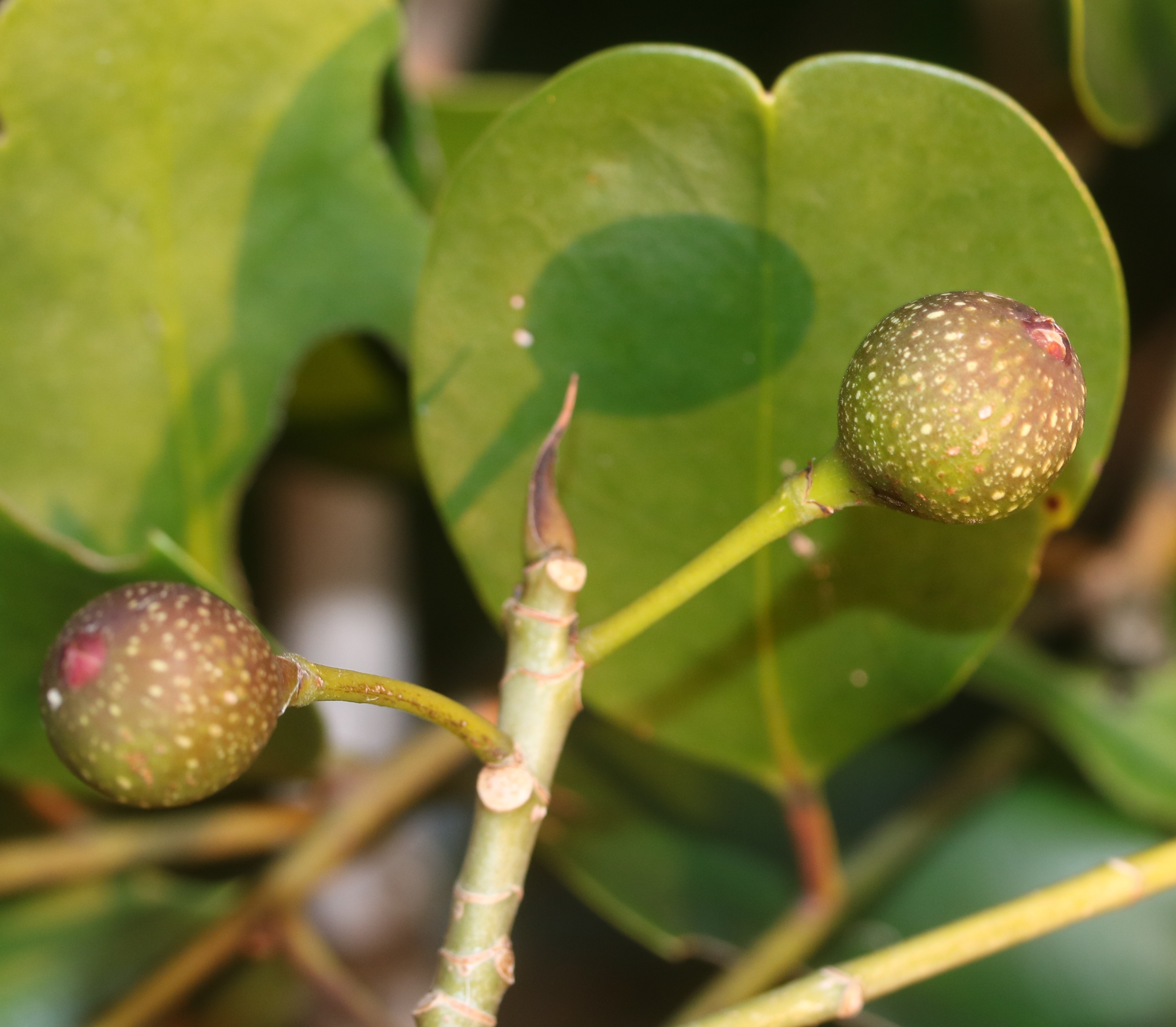
Ripening fruit

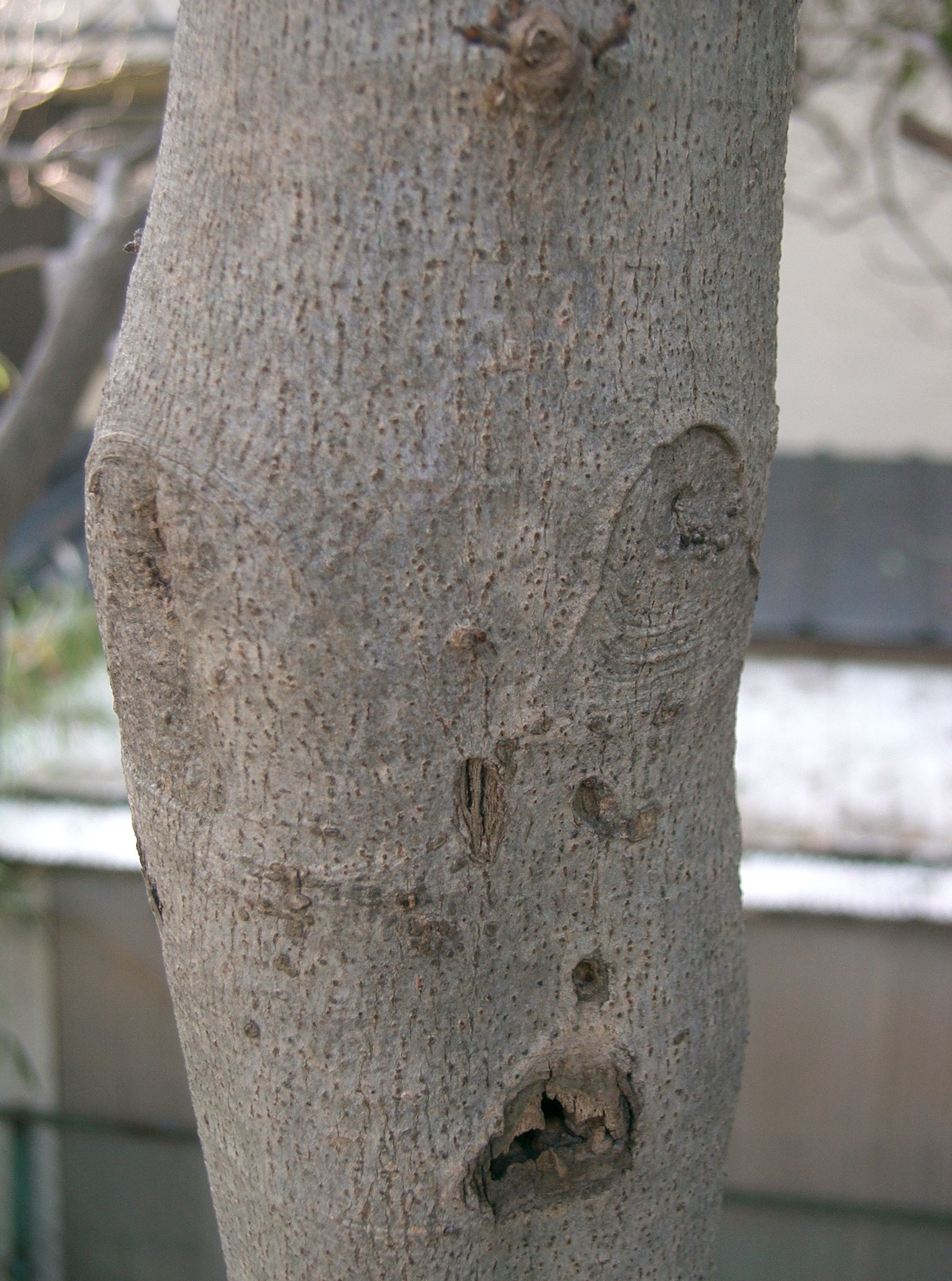
Trunk

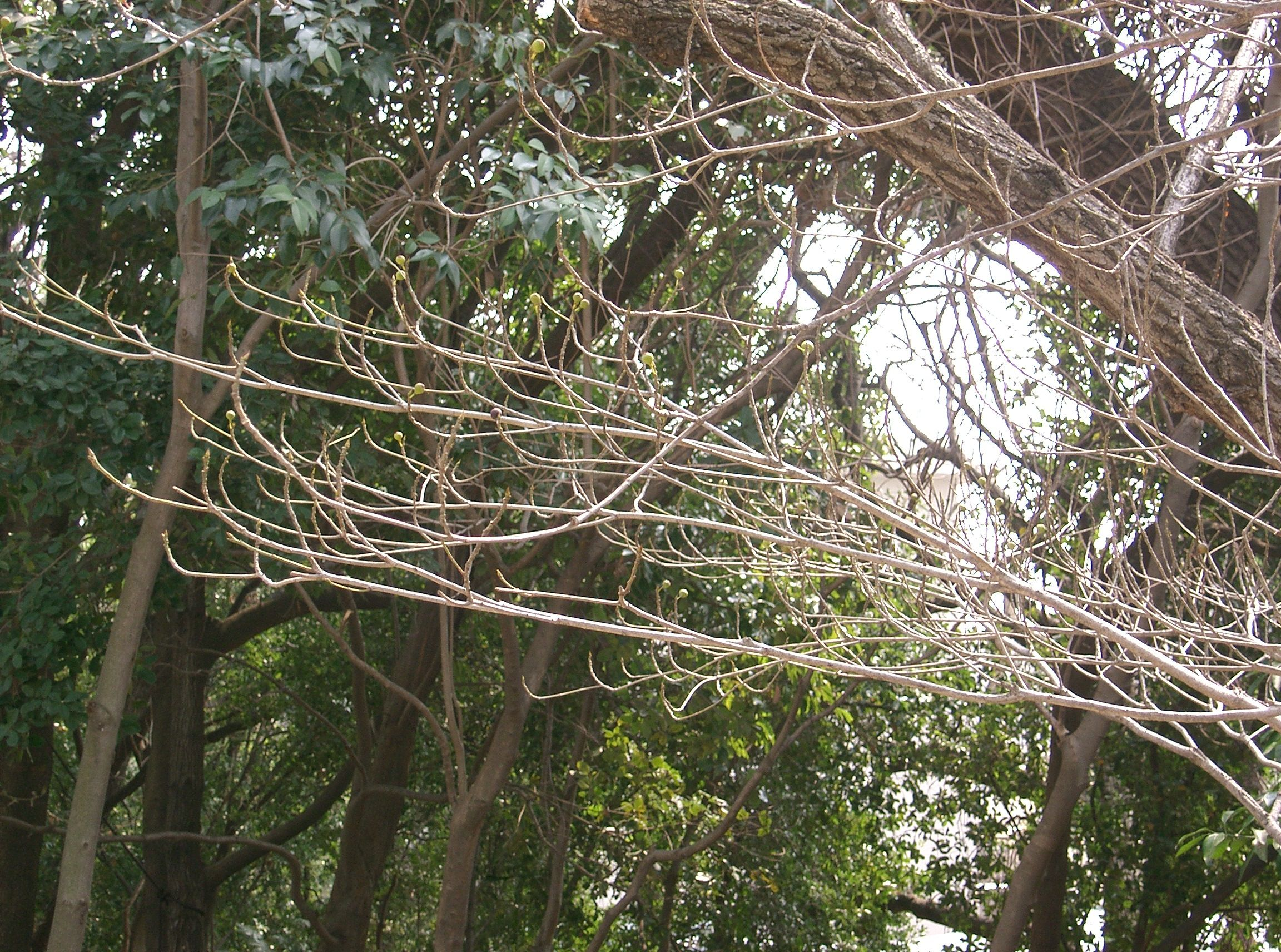
Branches

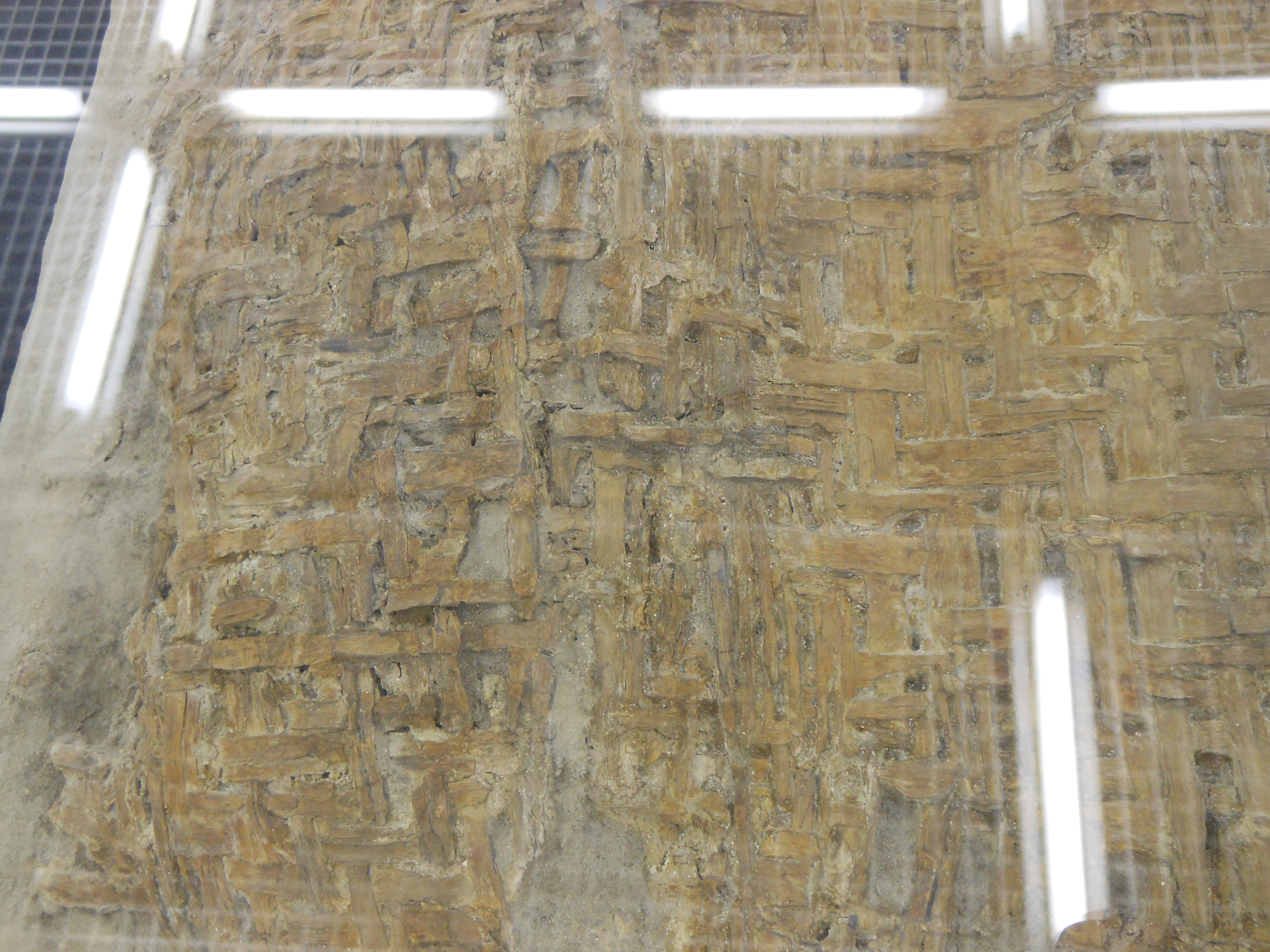
Jōmon period basket made from Ficus erecta about 8,000 years ago
