= H50 =

H50 may refer to:

== Television ==
- Hawaii Five-O (1968 TV series), a police procedural drama set in Hawaii, originally aired from 1968 to 1980
- Hawaii Five-0 (2010 TV series), the 2010 remake of Hawaii Five-O

== Vehicles ==
- HMS H50, a 1920 British Royal Navy H class submarine
- QH-50 DASH, a U.S. Navy unmanned anti-submarine helicopter
- H50, the third generation of Toyota HiAce

== Other ==
- DSC-H50, a 2008 Sony 9.1 megapixel Cyber-shot H series camera
- ICD-10 code for strabismus

== See also ==
- Hawaii Five-O (disambiguation)
