= 5O =

5O or 5-O may refer to:

- ASL Airlines France (IATA airline code: 5O)
- 5-O-caffeoylquinic acid, see Chlorogenic acid
- 5-O-(4-coumaroyl)-D-quinate 3'-monooxygenase
- 5-O-Methylations
- Cyanidin 3-O-rutinoside 5-O-glucosyltransferase
- Anthocyanin 5-O-glucoside 6'''-O-malonyltransferase
- a slang term for a Ford Mustang GT automobile with a 5.0 L engine
- 5.0, 2010 album by Nelly

== See also ==
- Five-O (disambiguation)
- O5 (disambiguation)
- 50 (disambiguation)
