= 50th Division =

50th Division or 50th Infantry Division may refer to:

== Infantry divisions ==
- 50th Division (1st Formation) (People's Republic of China)
- 50th Infantry Division (German Empire)
- 50th Reserve Division, German Empire
- 50th Infantry Division (Wehrmacht), Germany
- 50th Infantry Division "Regina", Kingdom of Italy
- 50th Division (Imperial Japanese Army)
- 50th Infantry Division (Russian Empire)
- 50th Guards Rifle Division, Soviet Union
- 50th Reserve Rifle Division, Soviet Union
- 50th Rifle Division, Soviet Union
- 50th (Northumbrian) Division, United Kingdom, World War I
- 50th (Northumbrian) Infantry Division, United Kingdom, World War II

== Armoured divisions ==
- 50th Armored Division, United States

== Aviation divisions ==
- 50th Air Division, United States

== See also ==
- 50 Divisions, an American compilation of construction information
- List of military divisions by number
- 50th Army (disambiguation)
- 50th Brigade (disambiguation)
- 50th Regiment (disambiguation)
- 50th Squadron (disambiguation)
- 50th Wing (disambiguation)
