= Antirrhinin =

Names
- IUPAC name (2S,3R,4S,5S,6R)-2-[2-(3,4-dihydroxyphenyl)-5,7-dihydroxychromenylium-3-yl]oxy-6-[[(2R,3R,4R,5R,6S)-3,4,5-trihydroxy-6-methyloxan-2-yl]oxymethyl]oxane-3,4,5-triol chloride
- Other names Keracyanin; Prunicyanin; Sambucin; Cyaninoside; Keraciannai; Keracyanine; Keracyaninum; Cyanidin 3-rutinoside Cyanidin 3-O-rutinoside; Keracyanin chloride cyanidin-3-rhamnoglucoside

Identifiers
CAS Number	18719-76-1
3D model (JSmol)	Interactive image
ChEBI	CHEBI:16726
ChEMBL	ChEMBL592218
ChemSpider	27186
ECHA InfoCard	100.038.646
KEGG	C04491
PubChem CID	29231
UNII	V0N2VMB4FV
CompTox Dashboard (EPA)	DTXSID00927864
- InChI: InChI=1S/C27H30O15.ClH/c1-9-19(32)21(34)23(36)26(39-9)38-8-18-20(33)22(35)24(37)27(42-18)41-17-7-12-14(30)5-11(28)6-16(12)40-25(17)10-2-3-13(29)15(31)4-10;/h2-7,9,18-24,26-27,32-37H,8H2,1H3,(H3-,28,29,30,31);1H/t9-,18+,19-,20+,21+,22-,23+,24+,26+,27+;/m0./s1 Key: ADZHXBNWNZIHIX-XYGAWYNKSA-N; InChI=1S/C27H30O15.ClH/c1-9-19(32)21(34)23(36)26(39-9)38-8-18-20(33)22(35)24(37)27(42-18)41-17-7-12-14(30)5-11(28)6-16(12)40-25(17)10-2-3-13(29)15(31)4-10;/h2-7,9,18-24,26-27,32-37H,8H2,1H3,(H3-,28,29,30,31);1H/t9-,18+,19-,20+,21+,22-,23+,24+,26+,27+;/m0./s1; Key: ADZHXBNWNZIHIX-XYGAWYNKSA-N
- SMILES: [Cl-].O(C[C@H]4O[C@@H](Oc2cc3c(O)cc(O)cc3[o+]c2c1ccc(O)c(O)c1)[C@H](O)[C@@H](O)[C@@H]4O)[C@@H]5O[C@H]([C@H](O)[C@@H](O)[C@H]5O)C

Properties
Chemical formula	C_{27}H_{31}O_{15}^{+}, Cl^{−}
Molar mass	630.97 g/mol (chloride); 595.52 g/mol (cation)
- Except where otherwise noted, data are given for materials in their standard state (at 25 °C [77 °F], 100 kPa). verify (what is ?) Infobox references

Antirrhinin is an anthocyanin. It is the 3-rutinoside of cyanidin.

== Occurrence ==
It can be found in Antirrhinum majus (common snapdragon).

It can be found in blackcurrant, açaí, black raspberry, litchi pericarp and common fig.

== Metabolism ==
Cyanidin 3-O-rutinoside 5-O-glucosyltransferase uses UDP-glucose and cyanidin 3-O-rutinoside (antirrhinin) to produce UDP and cyanidin 3-O-rutinoside 5-O-beta-D-glucoside.
