= Hawaii Five-O Theme =

1968 single by Morton Stevens

"Hawaii Five-O"

Single by Morton Stevens

from the album Hawaii Five-O (Original Television Soundtrack)
- Released: 1968
- Genre: Instrumental rock
- Songwriter: Morton Stevens

Audio
- "Hawaii Five-O" on YouTube

"Hawaii Five-O Theme" is an instrumental composed by Morton Stevens as the theme music for the CBS television series Hawaii Five-O, which aired from 1968 to 1980. It is considered by many to be one of the best television themes of all time. The Ventures recorded a popular cover version of the theme in 1968, which peaked in the top five of the singles charts in the United States and Canada, and became one of the band's biggest hits.

An early copy of the pilot of the Hawaii Five-O reboot series in 2010 initially used a synthesizer and guitar-based version of the theme, but it was later replaced by a shortened copy of the original theme. In 2015, Stevens' children filed a copyright infringement lawsuit against CBS over its use of the theme in the rebooted series.

== Alternate versions ==
=== The Ventures' version ===
"Hawaii Five-O"

Single by The Ventures

from the album Hawaii Five-O
- B-side: "Soul Breeze"
- Released: September 28, 1968
- Recorded: 1968
- Genre: Instrumental rock
- Length: 1:57
- Label: Liberty
- Songwriter: Morton Stevens

The Ventures singles chronology
"Land of 1000 Dances" (1968)	"Hawaii Five-O" (1968)	"Theme from A Summer Place" (1969)

Audio
- "Hawaii Five-O" on YouTube

The Ventures' cover of the song spent 14 weeks on the Billboard Hot 100 pop chart, peaking at no. 4 on May 10, 1969, and 11 weeks on the Billboard adult contemporary chart, rising to no. 8 on May 17. It was also the title track of their 1969 album Hawaii Five-O. In Canada, it peaked at no. 5 in the May 12, 1969, issue of RPM magazine.

There is conflicting information about which parts were recorded by the band members. AFM union contracts show that members of The Wrecking Crew, a group of prominent session musicians in Los Angeles, participated in an initial recording session in April 1968. The general consensus from recollections of those at the session is that the Ventures were present alongside Wrecking Crew players and an orchestra during the initial session, with Ventures lead guitarist Nokie Edwards learning the lead part from Wrecking Crew guitarist Tommy Tedesco (who came in for further, unspecified work on the track in August 1968, while the band was touring in Japan).

=== Other versions ===
Although the theme is most widely known as an instrumental, it has been released with at least two similar but different sets of lyrics. The first, "You Can Come with Me" by Don Ho, opens with an instrumental in the familiar tempo, then settles into a ballad style for the sung portion. The second, by Sammy Davis Jr., titled "You Can Count on Me (Theme from Hawaii Five-O)", maintains the driving style of the original instrumental throughout. Another version composed by Brian Tyler was used in the 2010 version of Hawaii Five-0.

== Copyright lawsuit ==
In March 2015, Stevens' adult children, Lisa Stevens Brown and Mark Stevens, sued CBS in the U.S. District Court for the Central District of California for copyright infringement stemming from the re-use of the music in the 2010 series. The suit alleged that when Stevens died in 1991, the right to renew the copyright in the work had reverted to the Stevens estate (initially to Stevens' widow, Annie Stevens, and upon her death in 2014, to their two children). According to the suit, when CBS in 1997 filed a registration of renewal with the U.S. Copyright Office, it had no right to do so, and CBS's further uses of the work after the 1991 reversion were infringing.

CBS did not respond to the suit despite multiple stipulations to extend time to file an answer. After the Stevens children did not follow up with a request for default judgment, the court in November 2015 issued an order to show cause why the suit should not be dismissed for lack of prosecution. On November 20, the plaintiffs filed a notice of voluntary dismissal with prejudice, dropping the case.

== In popular culture ==
The theme is popular with college and high school marching bands, especially at the University of Hawaii, where it has become the unofficial fight song. The tune has also been heard at Robertson Stadium after Houston Dynamo goals scored by Brian Ching, a native of Hawaii. Because of the tempo of the music, the theme gained popularity in the UK with followers of Northern soul and was popular on dance floors in the 1970s.

Australian proto-punk band Radio Birdman borrowed heavily from the program and its theme for their 1977 single "Aloha, Steve & Danno", later included on selected versions of the album Radios Appear. Bandleader Deniz Tek, who grew up in Ann Arbor, Michigan, during the heyday of MC5 and The Stooges, commented that he found Sydney of the early 1970s to be a rather quiet and staid place in comparison, and that airings of the program were a weekly highlight. The song was written after the band members realized they were spending a lot of evenings watching the program. The lyrics of the song's verses consist entirely of references to storylines of the early episodes. The chorus alludes to the boredom which band members experienced when the program was not on. The song's guitar solos and other musical elements were directly derivative of the program's theme; Stevens received a writing credit as a result.

In the Australian movie The Dish, the theme was mistaken for the national anthem of the US by a local band upon the visit of the US Ambassador to Parkes, NSW, to commemorate the 1969 Moon landing.

Bill Murray sang his own made-up lyrics to the song on one of his "Nick the Lounge Singer" skits on Saturday Night Live.

On the 1997 Bill Nye the Science Guy episode "Volcanoes", the MIDI version of "Hawaii Five-O" was used during the "Pahoehoe Five-O" segments.

A sample of the song can be heard in Donkey Kong Country 3: Dixe Kong's Double Trouble as an easter egg if the players enter a combination when on a vehicle on the world map.

The DreamWorks movie Shrek 2 (2004) featured a scene where a fanfare trumpeter, by the name of Reggie, played the opening section of the theme shortly before getting smacked. The scene became an internet meme, with various edits being done on the scene.

The song was also featured in the film 50 First Dates (2004), and the Sammy Davis Jr. version of the theme song was re-recorded by Los Straitjackets with Deke Dickerson and released in 2014.

Darts player Wayne Mardle used the song as his walk-on song in 2013.

London punk band The Dark covered the song for a 7" single on Fresh Records in 1980.

The Ventures version appears in a 2019 TV commercial for Papa John's Pizza.

Radio broadcaster Neil Ocampo is widely credited by both listeners and the media with popularizing the theme in the Philippines, as it became the signature opening theme of his long-running national radio program that ran from 1996 until prior to his death in 2020.

On the 1980 SCTV episode "Hollywood Salutes the Extras", a mock trailer presents Hawaii Five-Ho, with the role normally associated with Hawaii Five-O lead character Steve McGarrett switched to Don Ho, played by Tony Rosato. When investigating a night club and finding there is no warm-up act for Frank Sinatra who is performing later that evening, Ho/Rosato tells his colleagues: 'Chin! Danno! Book me!', after which he is seen on stage singing nonsense scat to the melody of the Hawaii Five-O theme.

The former magistrate of Hualien and also the legislator of Hualian in Taiwan, Fu Kun-chi, use this song as his walk-on song.
