= 05 =

05 may refer to:

- The year 2005, or any year ending with 05
- The month of May
- 05, the number of the French department of Hautes-Alpes
- 05, the number used by racing car driver Peter Brock on most cars he competed with
- Lynk
- & Co 05, a 2019–present Chinese compact SUV
- VUHL 05, a 2015–2020 Mexican sports car

== See also ==
- 5 (disambiguation)
- O5 (disambiguation), oh five
- O-5 (disambiguation), oh dash five
