= 50 =

50 or fifty may refer to:

- 50 (number), the natural number following 49 and preceding 51
- one of the following years 50 BC, AD 50, 1950, 2050
- .50 BMG, a heavy machine gun cartridge also used in sniper rifles
- .50 Action Express, a large pistol cartridge commonly used in the Desert Eagle
- .50 GI, a wildcat pistol cartridge
- .50 Beowulf, a powerful rifle cartridge used in the AR-15 platform
- .50 Alaskan, a wildcat rifle cartridge
- 50 Cent, an American rapper
- Labatt 50, a Canadian beer
- Fifty (film), a 2015 film
- "The Fifty", a group of fifty airmen murdered by the Gestapo after The Great Escape in World War II
- 50 (Rick Astley album), 2016
- 50 (Chris de Burgh album), 2024
- 50 (Herb Alpert album), 2024
- Benjamin Yeaten, widely known by his radio call sign "50", a Liberian military and mercenary leader
- "Fifty", a song by Karma to Burn from the album V, 2011
- 50 Virginia, a main-belt asteroid
- Audi 50, a supermini hatchback
- Dodge Ram 50, a compact pickup truck sold in the United States as a rebadged Mitsubishi Triton

== See also ==
- 5O (disambiguation)
- 50th (disambiguation)
- Fifty pence (disambiguation)
- Fifty dollar bill (disambiguation)
