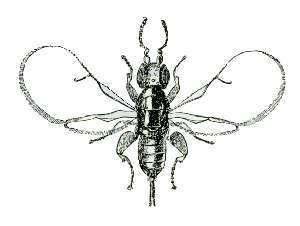

Scientific classification
- Kingdom: Animalia
- Phylum: Arthropoda
- Class: Insecta
- Order: Hymenoptera
- Family: Agaonidae
- Genus: Blastophaga
- Species: B. psenes

Binomial name
- Blastophaga psenes (Linnaeus, 1758)

Synonyms
- Blastophaga grossorum Gravenhorst, 1827; Blastophaga vaidi Joseph, 1954; Cynips psenes Linnaeus, 1758

= Blastophaga psenes =

Species of wasp

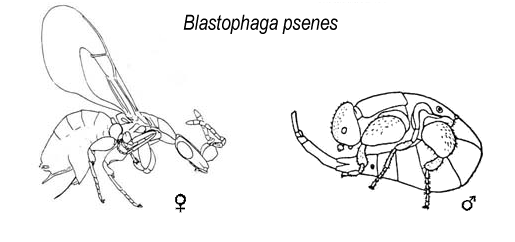
Winged female and wingless male

Blastophaga psenes is a wasp species in the genus Blastophaga. It pollinates the common fig Ficus carica and the closely related Ficus palmata. These wasps breed in figs without the need for a colony or nest, and the adults live for only a few days or weeks. They locate the fig they wish to pollinate primarily using olfaction.

== Taxonomy and phylogenetics ==
Mutualism occurs between figs and fig wasps, which creates a need for specific species of figs to be pollinated by specific species of wasps. The origin of mutualism is also the beginning of the fig wasp phylogeny. In the phylogenetic tree, the genus of Blastophaga and Wiebesia are very similar. Both of these genera pollinate Ficus genus of figs.

== Description and identification ==
B. psenes are small wasps, approximately only 2 millimetres (0.079 in) in length. The females are black and shiny, while the males are smaller than the females. The males are wingless, whereas females have wings that are transparent and extremely thin. When the female wasps enter the opening of a fig, their wings and antennae detach. Upon dissecting a fig, the wings of the wasps can be seen at the opening of the fig. Additionally, adult wasps, larvae, and eggs are found within the fig. The wasps are free-living and their lifespan spans from a few days to weeks.

== Distribution and habitat ==
Because B. psenes relies on Ficus carica to breed, it is found in regions where this fig species grows. The wasp is native to the Palaearctic, including Southern Europe near the Mediterranean Basin. B. psenes has been widely introduced to facilitate Ficus carica fruit bearing.

== Life cycle ==
Adult B. psenes only live for a up to a couple of weeks. These wasps lay fertilized eggs in female flowers of the syconium of a F. carica fig. When the larvae hatch, they develop in the fig ovaries, creating a gall. The larvae become adults around the same time that male fig flowers are ready to produce pollen. When an adult wasp is mature, it mates with another wasp within the syconium. After mating, females emerge from the fig and search for a new nearby fig in which to lay their eggs. The female then oviposits into a new syconium. From there, B. psenes will find another fig to repeat the process again.

=== Mutualism ===
Each species of fig is pollinated by a specific species of fig wasp. This kind of interaction between these two different organism is known as mutualism. Both of them live in close physical association and benefit from one another. The fig serves as a "nest" for fig wasps, a place to lay and grow their eggs. For the fig, the fig wasps act as agents of pollination where pollen is carried to other plants for reproduction. Specifically, B. psenes has a mutualistic relationship with the fig species F. carica. This fig can only be pollinated by the symbiotic wasp that has retrieved pollen from another syconium. Female wasps oviposit in the syconium for hatching. When these larvae emerge as adults, they carry the pollen accumulated in the syconium out of the fig to another nearby syconium. Thus, when wasps lay their eggs, they are also actually pollinating that syconium. A major difference between male and female fig trees can also be observed.

==== Male trees ====
Male trees contain female flowers with short styles. This is beneficial for wasps which do not have very long ovipositors and can only parasitize ovaries of female flowers with short styles found only on male trees. All female flowers on male trees with parasitized ovaries means the ovaries contain wasp eggs and produce larva instead of seeds. On the other hand, female flowers on male trees with non-parasitized ovaries will produce seeds, helping in pollination and reproduction of that flower.

==== Female trees ====
Female flowers on female trees have long styles. Therefore, wasps cannot parasitize these ovaries because their ovipositors are too short to reach the bottom of the syconium. Because wasp eggs cannot be laid in these female flowers, all female flowers on female trees produce seeds instead of larvae. This feature of female flowers on female trees is the explanation why it is nearly impossible for wasps to emerge from a female fig tree. Fig wasps cannot perform oviposition in there and they can be dangerously stuck in that syconium.

==== Difference between winter and spring caprifigs ====
There is also a difference in winter and spring caprifigs (male figs) and their availability to receive eggs and become pollinated. Spring caprifigs usually produce more wasps than winter caprifigs because of better and more resources available for them. This implies that the fig wasp population is much more active and larger in the springtime. The spring and winter caprifigs have a life cycle related to each other as to maximize resources and output of figs and wasps. Winter, or delayed, caprifigs are usually observed to occur on male trees. Spring, or undelayed, caprifigs usually occur on female trees. Because female trees are lethal, wasps prefer these delayed caprifigs of male trees.

==== Chemoattraction ====
Once fig wasps emerge from the syconium, they must determine the fig in which they will deposit their eggs. They need to make sure that the fig they find is available and acceptable for breeding. In the case of B. psenes, olfactory stimuli guide the wasp to a fig that is available to receive wasp eggs. This olfactory stimulus is specific for the wasps' host fig (in this case, F. carica) and enables the wasps to distinguish between their host and other fig species. Figs in their receptive phase emit a compound called pentane that can attract B. psenes from at least 5 meters away. Upon sensing these signals from a specific syconium, the wasp will approach that fig. Before entering, the wasps will assess the fig by holding up their heads and antennae next to the opening of the syconium (the ostiole—where the actual attractive substances come from). If a wasp detects the signal, it will lower its antennae and search for the entrance to the fig. By using its sense of smell and taste, the wasp can trace the actual entrance into a fig once the desired fig has been located. If the wasp does not detect a signal, it will not enter the fig. Instead, it will move on and search for another receptive fig. Due to the difference between male and female trees, male tree figs are more attractive than female tree figs.

=== Mating ===
Males emerge first from their cocoon and begin searching for females to mate with. Sometimes mating occurs before the female has finished emerging from its cocoon. Males then start enlarging the fig's opening. Some fall from the fig to the ground. They have no wings and die shortly after. The enlarged opening enables the females to leave the syconium in search of a new one in which to oviposit. Mating occurs within the syconium and laying eggs occurs in the syconium of a different fig.

== Kin selection ==
=== Kin ===
The wasps breed inside the fig. Later, the female lays its eggs in the ovaries of another fig by sticking its ovipositor in each flower's style. This can lead to some flowers not being pollinated because some styles are too long. Each larva from a deposited egg destroys a female flower when it feeds on its growing seed. When wasps emerge from the syconium, they rush to the nearest syconia. This rush creates a large number of wasps all competing to enter an adjacent syconium. Due to this rush, pollination will become less effective as more pollen falls off of the wasp bodies. Offspring number depends on number of pollinator wasps per syconium. The number of offspring is low when the entry number of wasps in a syconium is high. On average, each wasp has 3 broods a year; one for each of the different seasonal caprifigs. Also, reproductive success depends heavily on transmission of strong signals by plant.

== Interactions with other species ==
=== Diet ===
When they are hatched, B. psenes larvae feed on hyperplastic floret tissue. The mother produces this hyperplastic tissue when she lays the eggs in the syconium.

=== Predation ===
One of the main predators of these wasps is ants. Ants find these wasps using chemical signals such as odor cues. The ants use the fig-fig wasp mutualism to find the fig wasps by detecting an odor that comes from the figs of the male trees. They know that most fig wasps are located on male fig trees, so they use that relationship to prey on wasps. This concept is called associative learning of odor because the ants are indirectly finding these wasps by associating the smell of the fig with the wasps. However, some ants do not respond to the odor of figs for different reasons. For instance, the fig could be a non-pollinator and therefore not release any chemical substance. In the case where the ants cannot detect odors, the wasps will not be predated upon.

=== Parasitism ===
B. psenes are parasitized by a nematode Schistonchus caprifici. These parasites are carried in the hemocoel of the female wasp. When a B. psenes wasp oviposits her egg inside the syconium, nematodes are also deposited. These nematodes then invade, feed, and reproduce inside the floret tissues. Larvae finish development with nematode still inside the hemocoel. After fertilization, females emerge from a syconium with nematodes still in hemocoel along with pollen flakes along her body. Because this nematode is primarily found in the hemocoel of a female wasp, males are not associated with nematodes. B. psenes is a very efficient host of these nematodes.

=== Interactions with kleptoparasitic species ===
B. psenes also is sometimes associated with, Philotrypesis caricae, a non-fig pollinating wasp, which is sometimes referred to as a kleptoparasite of B. psenes. Unlike B. psenes which oviposit in the syconium, P. caricae oviposit at the outside of the florets and travel to multiple figs. Larvae of P. caricae also eat the galled fig tissue, so it is not clear if this interaction is a true kleptoparasitic relationship.

=== Disease ===
Some wasps carry a disease that is carried by F. carica trees. This disease is a fungus called Fusarium moniliforme, or fig endosepsis. The wasps carry this disease on their wings and body. Because the fungus grows on the ostiole, the fungus is transmitted to the wasps' bodies when the wasp emerges from the syconium through the ostiole. Fig endosepsis is not transmitted transovarially by the fig wasp. The wasps become contaminated with spores of the fungus as they contact plant surfaces upon emergence. Studies show that wasps on upper surfaces of the leaves were infected with this fungus in higher levels than other wasps. Wasps who were higher up in the tree or further out on a branch also showed more fungus on their wings and bodies. This led to the conclusion that contamination increases as the wasps walk on leaves, petioles, and fruits before they reach the opening to the syconium. This fungus affects both males and females. The fungus shows to be more evident in spring caprifigs that are pollinated with 5 to 10 winter caprifigs than when spring caprifigs are pollinated with only one winter caprifig. Also, the occurrence of this fungus is higher when there is a high population of wasps with limited figs. The more wasps that pass through one ostiole, the more likely the wasp will contract F. moniliforme.
