= P50 =

P50, P-50, or P.50 may refer to:

== Aircraft ==
- Grumman XP-50, an American twin-engine heavy fighter prototype of 1941
- Percival P.50 Prince, a late 1940s British light transport aircraft
- Piaggio P.50, an Italian heavy bomber prototype of 1937–1938
- Pottier P.50, a French racing aircraft developed in the late 1970s
- PZL.50 Jastrząb, a Polish fighter of the late 1930s

== Automobiles ==
- Honda P50, a Japanese moped
- Peel P50, a Manx three-wheeled microcar
- Trabant P 50, an East German small car

== Mathematics and science ==
- P50 (neuroscience), an auditory event-related potential recorded using EEG
- P50 (pressure), the partial pressure of a gas required to achieve 50% enzyme saturation
- ASCC1, activating signal cointegrator 1 complex subunit 1
- Median, or fiftieth percentile

== Other uses ==
- Huawei P50, a smartphone
- INS Sukanya (P50), a patrol vessel of the Indian Navy
- Kel-Tec P50, a semi-automatic pistol
- Papyrus 50, a New Testament manuscript
- Pauza P-50, a sniper rifle
- P50, a state regional road in Latvia

== See also ==
- 50P (disambiguation)
