= O5 =

O5 or O-5 may refer to:

- The Outreach Five a.k.a "Group of Five", emerging economies in the G8+5 forum: China, Mexico, India, Brazil and South Africa
- A symbol for the anti-Nazi Austrian Resistance, where the 5 stands for E and OE is the abbreviation of Österreich
- USS O-5 (SS-66), a 1917 O-class submarine
- HNLMS O 5, a 1913 O 2 class submarine of the Royal Netherlands Navy
- SM UC-99, a U-boat renamed O-5 for Japanese service from 1920 to 1921
- Douglas World Cruiser, also designated as Douglas O-5
- De Havilland Canada Dash 7, also designated as De Havilland Canada O-5
- LNER sub-class O4/5, a subclass of the LNER Class O4, locomotive class
- O-5, the pay grade for the following officer ranks in the U.S. uniformed services:
  - Lieutenant colonel in the Army, Marine Corps, Air Force, and Space Force
  - Commander in the Navy, Coast Guard, Public Health Service Commissioned Corps, and NOAA Commissioned Officer Corps
- Otoyol 5, a toll motorway in Turkey
- The time-displaced X-Men, also called "The Original 5"
- The senior “overseer” position in the fictional SCP Foundation

== See also ==
- 5O (disambiguation)
- Five-O (disambiguation)
- 05 (disambiguation), zero five
