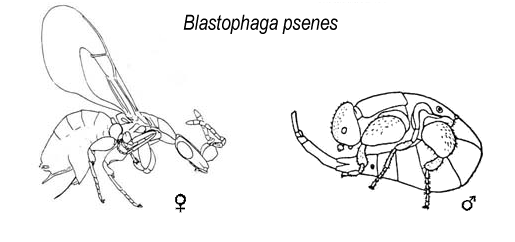
- Blastophaga psenes

Scientific classification
- Domain: Eukaryota
- Kingdom: Animalia
- Phylum: Arthropoda
- Class: Insecta
- Order: Hymenoptera
- Family: Agaonidae
- Subfamily: Agaoninae
- Genus: Blastophaga; Gravenhorst, 1829

Type species
- Blastophaga psenes (Linnaeus, 1758)

Species
- Blastophaga auratae Blastophaga psenes Blastophaga yeni

= Blastophaga =

Genus of wasps

Blastophaga is a genus of wasps in the family Agaonidae (fig wasps) which pollinate figs or are otherwise associated with figs, a coevolutional relationship that has been developing for at least 80 million years. Pollinating fig wasps are specific to specific figs. The common fig Ficus carica is pollinated by Blastophaga psenes.

The common figs contain no gall flowers for the reception of wasp eggs, and the Blastophaga female moves from flower to flower, incidentally fertilizing them, but is prevented from depositing her eggs. Worn out, the wasp perishes. Any eggs she may have dropped also perish.
