= Anthocyanin 5-O-glucoside 6'''-O-malonyltransferase =

Identifiers
- EC no.: 2.3.1.172

Databases
- IntEnz: IntEnz view
- BRENDA: BRENDA entry
- ExPASy: NiceZyme view
- KEGG: KEGG entry
- MetaCyc: metabolic pathway
- PRIAM: profile
- PDB structures: RCSB PDB PDBe PDBsum
Search
- PMC: articles
- PubMed: articles
- NCBI: proteins

In enzymology, an anthocyanin 5-O-glucoside 6'''-O-malonyltransferase (EC 2.3.1.172) is an enzyme that catalyzes the chemical reaction

malonyl-CoA + pelargonidin 3-O-(6-caffeoyl-beta-D-glucoside) 5-O-beta-D-glucoside $\rightleftharpoons$ CoA + 4'''-demalonylsalvianin

Thus, the two substrates of this enzyme are malonyl-CoA and pelargonidin 3-O-(6-caffeoyl-beta-D-glucoside) 5-O-beta-D-glucoside, whereas its two products are CoA and 4'''-demalonylsalvianin.

This enzyme belongs to the family of transferases, specifically those acyltransferases transferring groups other than aminoacyl groups. The systematic name of this enzyme class is malonyl-CoA:pelargonidin-3-O-(6-caffeoyl-beta-D-glucoside)-5-O-beta- D-glucoside 6'''-O-malonyltransferase.
