= 50th Street =

50th Street may refer to:

- 50th Street (Manhattan), New York City, United States
- 50 Street, Edmonton, Alberta, Canada

== Subway stations ==
=== New York City ===
- 50th Street (IRT Broadway–Seventh Avenue Line); serving the 1 and 2 trains
- 50th Street (IND Eighth Avenue Line); serving the A, C, and E trains
- 50th Street (IRT Ninth Avenue Line) (demolished)
- 50th Street (IRT Second Avenue Line) (demolished)
- 50th Street (IRT Sixth Avenue Line) (demolished)
- 47th–50th Streets–Rockefeller Center (IND Sixth Avenue Line); serving the B, D, F, <F>, and M trains
- 50th Street (BMT West End Line) in Brooklyn; serving the D train
- Bay 50th Street (BMT West End Line) in Brooklyn; serving the D train

=== Other cities ===
- 50th Street/Washington station in Phoenix, Arizona; serving Valley Metro Rail
