= Cyanidin 3-O-rutinoside 5-O-glucosyltransferase =

Class of enzymes

Cyanidin-3-rhamnosylglucoside 5-O-glucosyltransferase

Identifiers
- EC no.: 2.4.1.116
- CAS no.: 70248-66-7

Databases
- IntEnz: IntEnz view
- BRENDA: BRENDA entry
- ExPASy: NiceZyme view
- KEGG: KEGG entry
- MetaCyc: metabolic pathway
- PRIAM: profile
- PDB structures: RCSB PDB PDBe PDBsum
- Gene Ontology: AmiGO / QuickGO
Search
- PMC: articles
- PubMed: articles
- NCBI: proteins

Cyanidin 3-O-rutinoside 5-O-glucosyltransferase (EC 2.4.1.116) is an enzyme that catalyzes the chemical reaction

antirrhinin
+ UDP-glucose
UDP
cyanidin 3-O-rutinoside 5-O-β-D-glucoside

The two substrates of this enzyme characterised from Silene dioica are antirrhinin and UDP-glucose. Its products are cyanidin 3-O-rutinoside 5-O-β-D-glucoside and uridine diphosphate (UDP). The enzyme has also been found in iris species.

This enzyme belongs to the family of glycosyltransferases, specifically the hexosyltransferases. The systematic name of this enzyme class is UDP-glucose:cyanidin-3-O-beta-L-rhamnosyl-(1->6)-beta-D-glucoside 5-O-beta-D-glucosyltransferase. Other names in common use include uridine diphosphoglucose-cyanidin 3-rhamnosylglucoside, 5-O-glucosyltransferase, cyanidin-3-rhamnosylglucoside 5-O-glucosyltransferase, UDP-glucose:cyanidin-3-O-D-rhamnosyl-1,6-D-glucoside, and 5-O-D-glucosyltransferase.

== See also ==
- Cyanidin
