= Five-O (mobile application) =

Five-O is a mobile application created by three African-American siblings from Georgia, USA. The three, Ima, Asha, and Caleb Christian, aged 16, 15, and 14 respectively, in 2014, created the application as an attempt to provide a solution to the issues generated from interaction between law enforcement and citizens, such as the shooting of Michael Brown, and their own traumatic experience with two police officers. The application was launched on 18 August 2014. The application is available on both Android and iOS platforms, and has been developed in collaboration with Pinetart Inc., a company developing mobile applications they have founded. The term Five-O is American slang for law enforcement, based on Hawaii Five-O, a television programme.

The application allows a user to maintenance of records in the form of a short description of interaction with an individual police officer, and a rating of the degree of courtesy and professionalism exhibited by the officer. It allows a user to record his/her personal details such as race and age. Such a record would be available for access as when needed. The application would provide a record of positive interactions, such as that of officers saving a pet, this record could be used to identify positive prototypes that other officers would aim to emulate. The application also provides information about the civil rights of a citizen from American Civil Liberties Union. The application is available for download on Android devices and is pending approval from iStore.

Elahe Izadi blogging for The Washington Post describes the application as Yelp like, she states that the application demonstrates that the black community in America doesn't implicitly trust the police, quoting surveys that inform that 70 percent of black men perceive police discrimination with relation with respect to whites, or 25 percent of black males aged between 18 and 34 experienced abuse at the hands of the police. Fatima Mazhar writing for carbonated.tv considers this application as one of the positives that has come out of the Michael Brown shooting.
