= Fifty dollar bill =

The fifty dollar bill may refer to banknotes of currencies that are named dollar. Note that some of these currencies may have coins for 50 dollars instead.

- Australian fifty-dollar note
- Canadian fifty-dollar note
- Hong Kong fifty-dollar note
- New Zealand fifty-dollar note
- United States fifty-dollar bill
