= Hawaii Five-O (album) =

Studio album by The Ventures
- Released: May 10, 1969
- Recorded: 1969
- Genre: Instrumental
- Length: 28:56
- Label: Liberty
- Producer: Joe Saraceno

The Ventures chronology
Underground Fire (1969)	Hawaii Five-O (1969)	Swamp Rock (1969)

Singles from Natural High
- 1. "Hawaii Five-O" Released: September 28, 1968; 2. "Theme from A Summer Place" Released: June 22, 1969

Professional ratings
Review scores
Source	Rating
Allmusic	3.5/5 stars

Hawaii Five-O is an instrumental album by the Ventures. It is named for the popular 1968 television series, and featured the theme song from the series composed by Morton Stevens as its title track. It was released in 1969 on Liberty Records LST-8061 and reached #11 on the Billboard Top LP chart, staying for 24 weeks. The album was certified gold by RIAA on July 21, 1971. The popularity of the album was propelled by the hit title track, which reached #4 on the Billboard Pop Singles chart.

== Track listing ==
1. "Hawaii Five-O" (Morton Stevens) – 1:59
2. "Lovin' Things" (Jet Loring, Artie Schroeck) – 2:31
3. "Galveston" (Jimmy Webb) – 2:40
4. "The Letter" (Wayne Carson Thompson) – 2:10
5. "Don't Give in to Him" (Gary Usher) – 2:12
6. "Theme from A Summer Place" (Max Steiner) – 2:16
7. Medley: "Spooky" (Harry Middlebrooks, Mike Shapiro)/"Traces" (Buddy Buie, James Cobb, Emory Gordy Jr.)/"Stormy" (Buie, Cobb) – 4:25
8. "Medley: Aquarius/Let the Sunshine In" (Gerome Ragni, James Rado, Galt MacDermot) – 2:49
9. "Games People Play" (Joe South) – 2:46
10. "I Can Hear Music" (Jeff Barry, Ellie Greenwich, Phil Spector) – 2:37
11. "Dizzy" (Tommy Roe, Freddy Weller) – 2:31

== Personnel ==
=== Ventures ===
- Don Wilson – rhythm guitar
- Gerry McGee – lead guitar
- Bob Bogle – bass, lead guitar
- Mel Taylor – drums

=== Technical ===
- Joe Saraceno – producer
- Lanky Linstrot – engineer
- Mike Melvoin – arrangements (except on "Hawaii Five-O")
- George Tipton - arrangement on "Hawaii Five-O"
- Gabor Halmos – design
- Woody Woodward – art direction
- Jerry White – photography front cover
- Gerald Trafficanda – photography back cover
