= Fifty pence =

Fifty pence, 50p or 50P may refer to:

- Fifty pence (British coin), one half pound sterling
- Fifty pence (Irish coin), one half of the now withdrawn Irish pound
- Fifty Pence, nickname of a fictional character from M.I.High
- Fifty Pence (or 50 Pence), pseudonym of Liam Don, a musician from Hemel Hempstead who has written parodies of 50 Cent songs
- 50p, the frame rate

== See also ==
- Penny
- Pound (currency)
- P50 (disambiguation)
- Half dollar, a list of currencies worth fifty cents rather than pence
