= 50th Regiment =

50th Regiment or 50th Infantry Regiment may refer to:

== Infantry regiments ==
- 50th (Queen's Own) Regiment of Foot, a unit of the British Army, 1755–1881
- Shirley's Regiment (50th Regiment of Foot, American Provincials), a unit of the British Army
- 50th (Northumbrian) Infantry Division, a unit of the British Army
- 50th Infantry Regiment (United States), a unit of the United States Army
- 50th Infantry Regiment (Greece), a unit of the Greek Army
- 50th Regiment "Highlanders", a unit of the Canadian Army

=== American Civil War regiments ===
==== Union (Northern) regiments ====
- 50th Illinois Infantry Regiment
- 50th Indiana Infantry Regiment
- 50th Ohio Infantry Regiment
- 50th Pennsylvania Infantry Regiment
- 50th Wisconsin Infantry Regiment
- 50th United States Colored Infantry Regiment

==== Confederate (Southern) regiments ====
- 50th Georgia Infantry Regiment
- 50th North Carolina Infantry Regiment
- 50th Virginia Infantry Regiment

== Other regiments ==
- 50th Anti-Aircraft Missile Regiment (Romania), a unit of the Romanian Army
- 50th Royal Tank Regiment, a unit of the British Army
- 50th Armoured Regiment (India), a unit of the Indian Army
- 50th Field Artillery Regiment (The Prince of Wales Rangers), RCA, a unit of the Canadian Army

== See also ==
- 50th Division (disambiguation)
- 50th Brigade (disambiguation)
- 50th Squadron (disambiguation)
