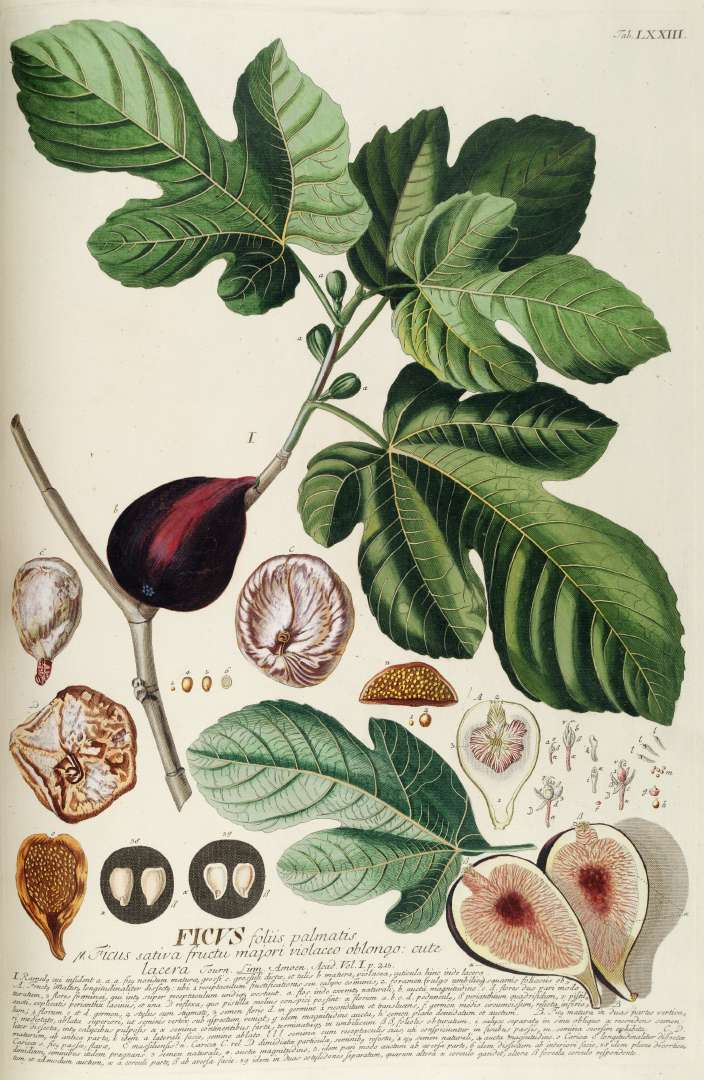
- Foliage and fruit drawn in 1771

Conservation status
- Least Concern (IUCN 3.1)

Scientific classification
- Kingdom: Plantae
- Clade: Tracheophytes
- Clade: Angiosperms
- Clade: Eudicots
- Clade: Rosids
- Order: Rosales
- Family: Moraceae
- Genus: Ficus
- Subgenus: F. subg. Ficus
- Species: F. carica

Binomial name
- Ficus carica L.

Synonyms
- Synonymy: Caprificus insectifera Gasp.; Caprificus leucocarpa Gasp.; Caprificus oblongata Gasp.; Caprificus pedunculata (Miq.) Gasp.; Caprificus rugosa (Miq.) Gasp.; Caprificus sphaerocarpa Gasp.; Ficus albescens Miq.; Ficus burdigalensis Poit. & Turpin; Ficus caprificus Risso; Ficus colchica Grossh.; Ficus colombra Gasp.; Ficus communis Lam.; Ficus deliciosa Gasp.; Ficus dottata Gasp.; Ficus globosa Miq. 1848 not Blume 1825; Ficus hypoleuca Gasp.; Ficus hyrcana Grossh.; Ficus kopetdagensis Pachom.; Ficus latifolia Salisb.; Ficus leucocarpa Gasp.; Ficus macrocarpa Gasp.; Ficus neapolitana Miq.; Ficus pachycarpa Gasp.; Ficus pedunculata Miq.; Ficus polymorpha Gasp.; Ficus praecox Gasp.; Ficus regina Miq.; Ficus rugosa Miq.; Ficus silvestris Risso; Ficus rupestris (Hausskn. ex Boiss.) Azizian

= Fig =

Ficus carica – Common fig

Species of flowering plant, or its fruit

The fig is the edible fruit of Ficus carica (the common fig), a species of tree or shrub in the flowering plant family Moraceae, native to the Mediterranean region, and to western and southern Asia. It has been cultivated since ancient times and is now widely grown throughout the world. Ficus carica is the type species of the genus Ficus, which comprises over 800 tropical and subtropical plant species.

The fig plant is a deciduous tree or large shrub, growing up to 7–10 m (23–33 ft) tall, with smooth white bark. Its large leaves have three to five deep lobes. Its fruit (a syconium) is teardrop-shaped, 3–5 cm (1–2 in) long, initially green but may ripen toward purple or brown, and has sweet soft reddish flesh containing numerous small seeds. In the Northern Hemisphere, fresh figs are in season from early August to early October. They tolerate moderate seasonal drought and can be grown even in hot-summer continental climates.

In 2020, world production of raw figs was 1.26 million tonnes, led by Turkey (with 25% of the world total), Egypt, Morocco, and Algeria, collectively accounting for 62% of the total. Although the milky sap of the green parts of the plant is an irritant to human skin, figs can be eaten fresh or dried. They are also processed into jam, rolls, biscuits, and other types of desserts. Since ripe fresh figs are easily damaged in transport and do not keep well, most commercial production is in dried and processed forms. Raw figs contain roughly 80% water and 20% carbohydrates, with negligible protein, fat, and micronutrient content. They are a moderate source of dietary fiber.

== Etymology ==
The word fig, first recorded in English in the 13th century, derives from Old French figue, itself from Occitan (Old Provençal) figa, from Romance *fica, from Classical Latin ficus (fig or fig-tree). The Latin word along with Armenian t'uz and Greek σῦκον sycon (Boeotian τῦκον tukon) most likely all derive from a single source *tʰuōiḱo- or *tʰū(i)ḱo- in the Mediterranean region, perhaps in a Semitic language. The name of the caprifig, Ficus caprificus Risso, is derived both from Latin caper, genitive capri (he-goat) and English fig.

== Description ==
Ficus carica is a gynodioecious, deciduous tree or large shrub that grows up to 7–10 m (23–33 ft) tall, with smooth white bark. Its fragrant leaves are some 20 cm (8 in) long and 14 cm (5 1/2 in) wide, rough, and deeply lobed (three or five lobes).

The fig fruit develops as a hollow, fleshy structure called the syconium that is lined with numerous unisexual flowers. The tiny flowers bloom out of sight inside this structure. Although commonly called a fruit, the syconium is botanically an infructescence, containing multiple fruits. The small fig flowers and later small single-seeded (true) fruits line its interior surface. A small opening or ostiole, at the apex of the fruit, is a narrow passage that allows the specialized fig wasp, Blastophaga psenes, to enter and pollinate the flowers. Each fertilized ovule (one per flower, in its ovary) develops into a small, single-seeded fruit, (a drupelet). At maturity, these 'seeds' (single-seeded fruits) line the inside of the fig, a false fruit. The mature fig is 3–5 cm (1–2 in) long, with a green skin that sometimes ripens toward purple or brown. The tree has milky sap, produced by laticifer cells.

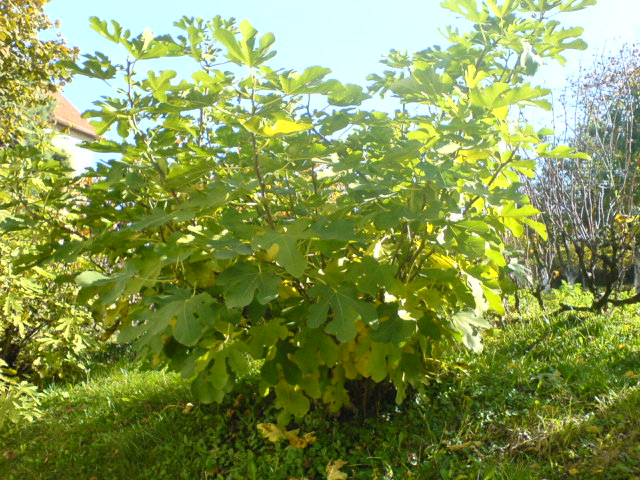
Habit

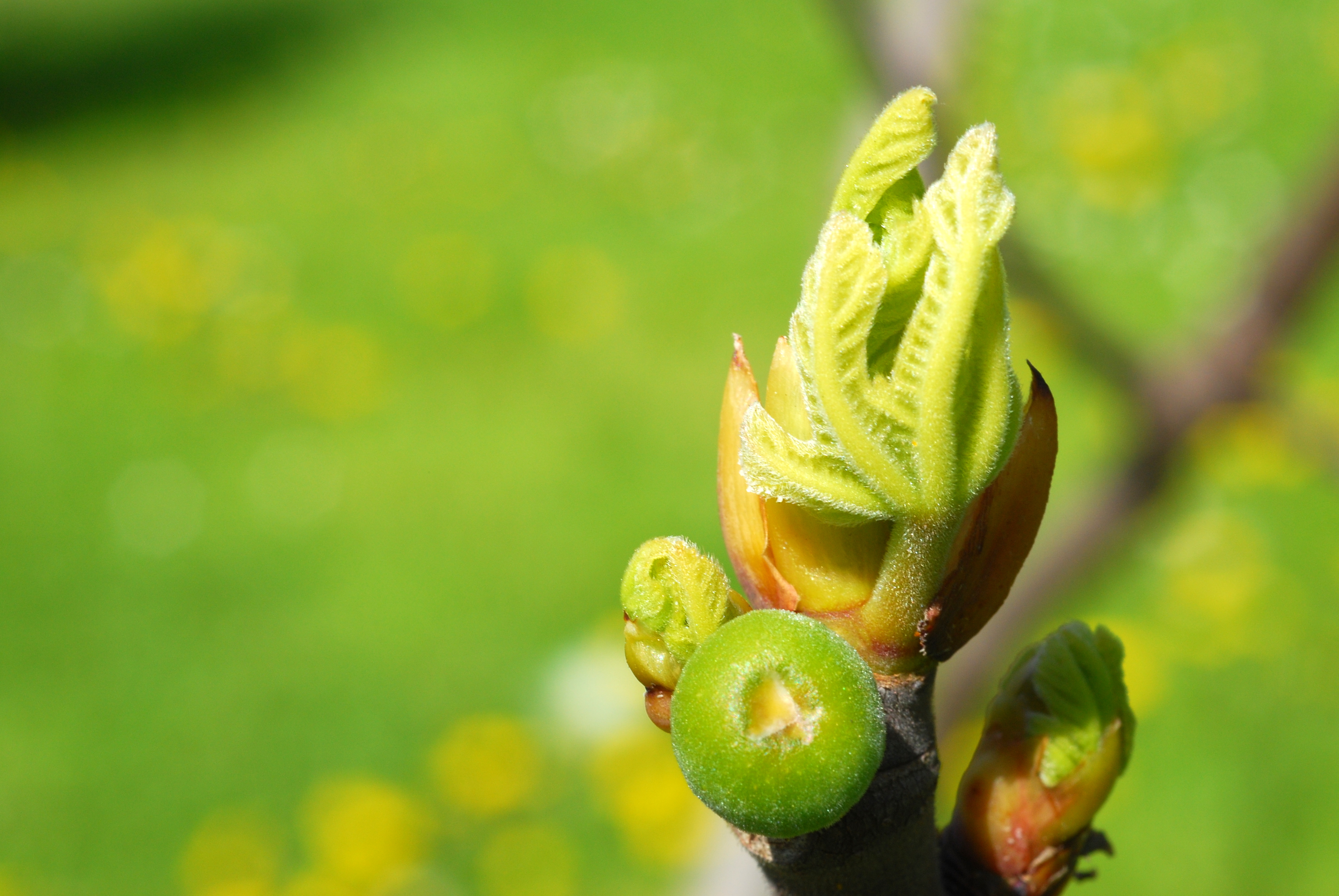
Bud

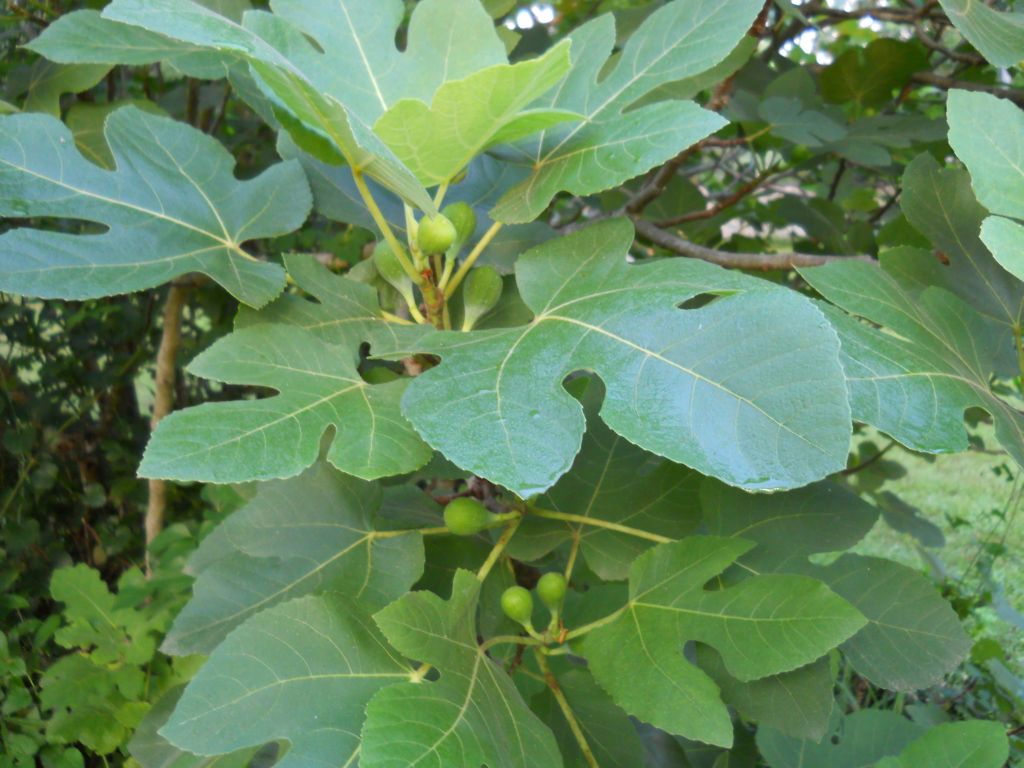
Leaves and immature fruit

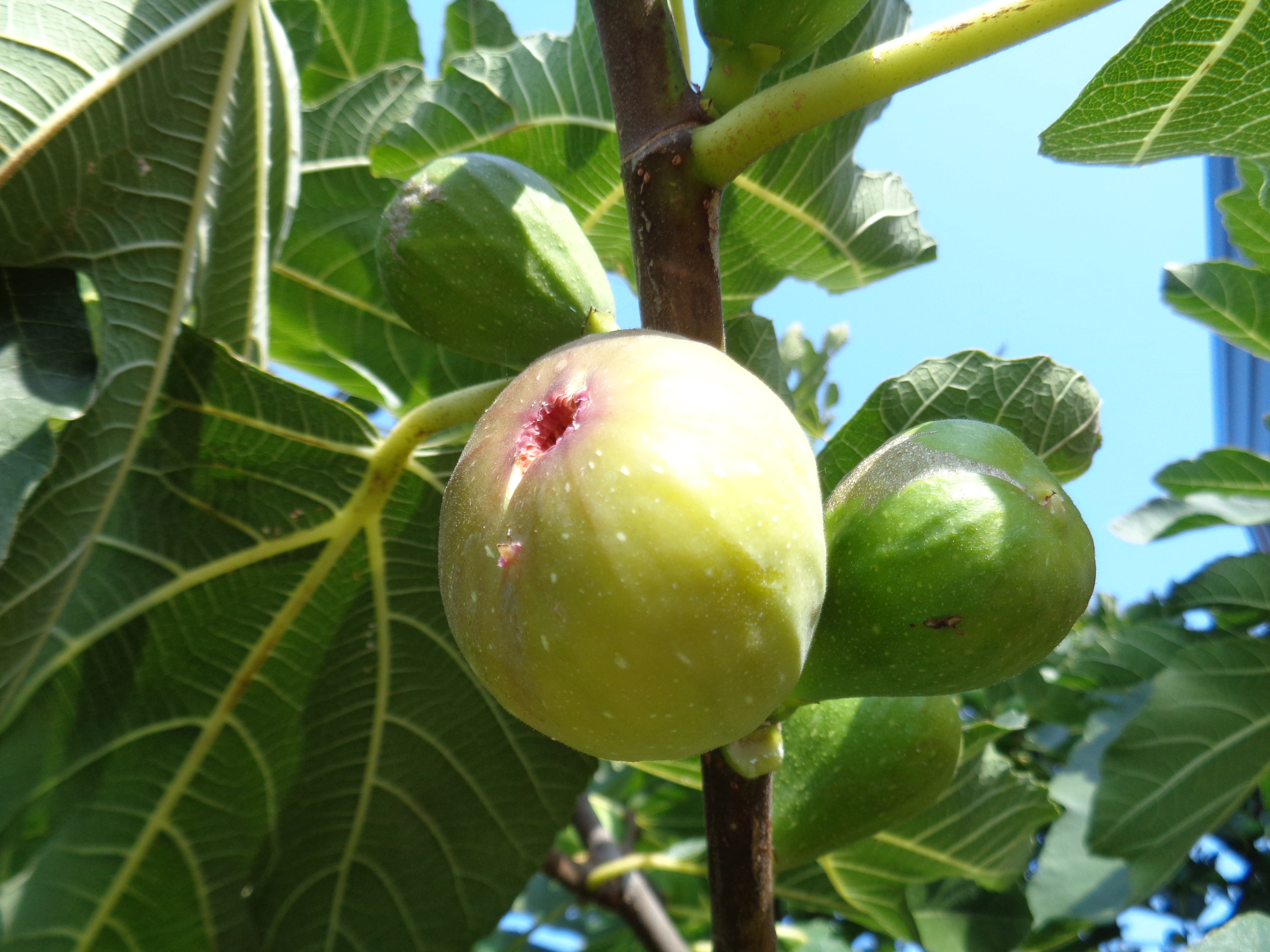
Figs in various stages of ripening

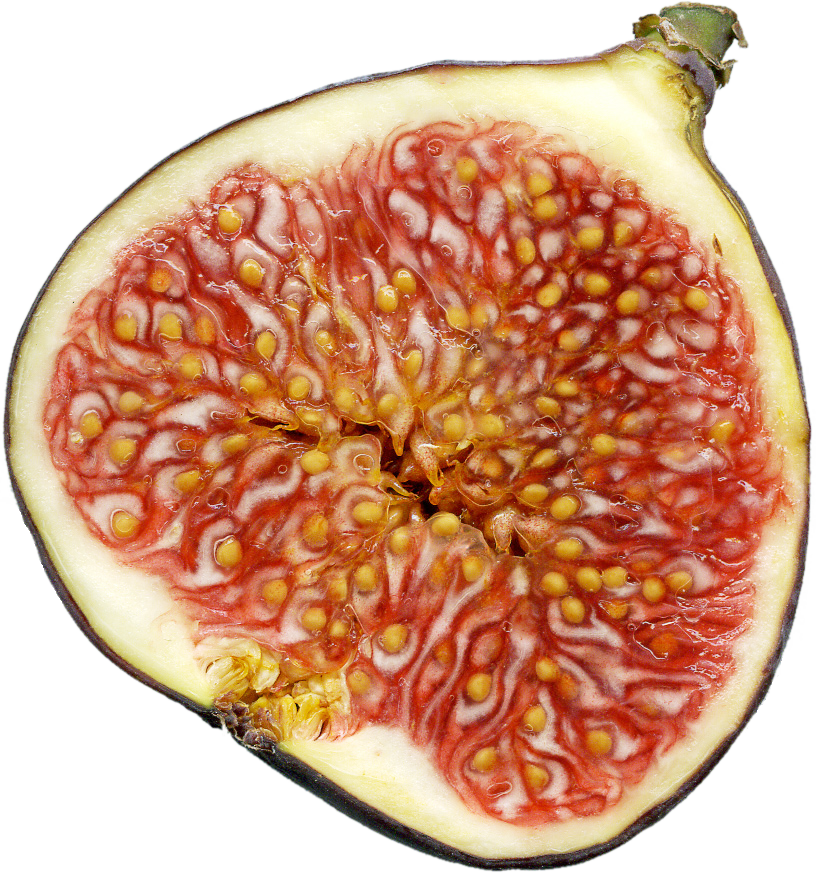
Vertical section of a fig

=== Chemistry ===
Figs contain diverse phytochemicals under basic research for their potential biological properties, including polyphenols, such as gallic acid, chlorogenic acid, syringic acid, (+)-catechin, (−)-epicatechin and rutin. Fig color may vary between cultivars due to various concentrations of anthocyanins, with cyanidin-3-O-rutinoside having particularly high content.

== Distribution and habitat ==
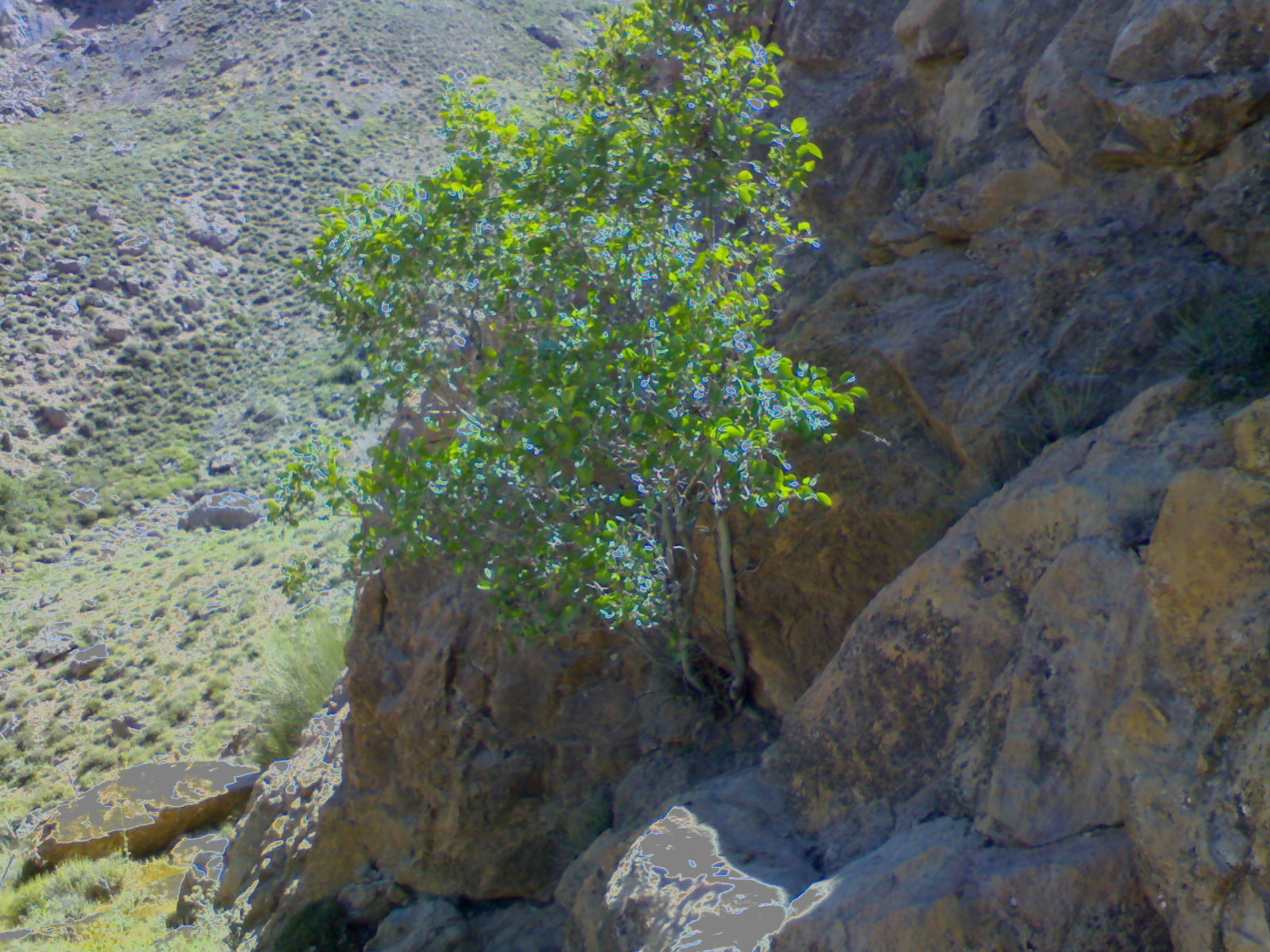
Mountain fig tree in Zibad

The fig has been cultivated since ancient times and grows wild in dry and sunny locations with deep and fresh soil, and in rocky locations that are at sea level to 1,700 m (5,600 ft) in elevation. It prefers relatively porous and freely draining soil, and can grow in nutritionally poor soil. Unlike other fig species, F. carica does not always require pollination by a wasp or from another tree, but can be pollinated by the fig wasp, Blastophaga psenes, to produce seeds. Fig wasps are not present to pollinate in colder regions such as the British Isles.

The species is naturalized in scattered locations in Asia and North America. The mountain or rock fig (Persian: انجیر کوهی, romanized: anjīr kuhi) is a wild variety, tolerant of cold dry climates, of the semi-arid rocky montane regions of Iran, especially in the Kūhestān mountains of Khorasan.

== Cultivation ==
=== Historical cultivation ===
The edible fig is probably the first plant to have been cultivated by humans. Nine subfossil figs of a parthenocarpic (and therefore sterile) type dating to about 9400–9200 BC were found in the early Neolithic village Gilgal I (in the Jordan Valley, 13 kilometres or 8 miles north of Jericho). The find precedes the domestication of wheat, barley, and legumes, and may thus be the first known instance of agriculture. It is proposed that this sterile but desirable type was planted and cultivated intentionally, one thousand years before the next crops were domesticated (wheat and rye). (Note: Also relevant are a comment on the proposal, and a response to that comment.)

In ancient Israel, figs were a staple crop and widely cultivated for both fresh consumption and preservation. Archaeological evidence from sites such as Tel Beit Shemesh reveals that pressed figs were stored in jars. Fig trees thrived in the region's dry, rocky soil and yielded two annual harvests: an early crop eaten fresh, and a later summer crop (qayiṣ) that was dried or pressed into fig-cakes for preservation and travel. Fig trees are frequently mentioned in the Hebrew Bible and are depicted in the Lachish reliefs alongside grapevines and date palms, confirming their place in the cultivated landscape of Judah.

Figs were widespread in ancient Greece, and their cultivation was described by both Aristotle and Theophrastus. Aristotle noted that, as in animal sexes, figs have individuals of two kinds, one (the cultivated fig) that bears fruit, and one (the wild caprifig) that assists the other to bear fruit. Further, Aristotle recorded that the fruits of the wild fig contain psenes (fig wasps); these begin life as larvae, and the adult psen splits its "skin" (pupa) and flies out of the fig to find and enter a cultivated fig, saving it from dropping. Theophrastus observed that just as date palms have male and female flowers, and that farmers (from the East) help by scattering "dust" from the male onto the female, and as a male fish releases his milt over the female's eggs, so Greek farmers tie wild figs to cultivated trees. They do not say directly that figs reproduce sexually, however.

Figs were also a common food source for the Romans. Cato the Elder, in his c. 160 BC De Agri Cultura, lists several strains of figs grown at the time he wrote his handbook: the Mariscan, African, Herculanean, Saguntine, and the black Tellanian. The fruits were used, among other things, to fatten geese for the production of a precursor of foie gras. Rome's first emperor, Augustus, was reputed to have been poisoned with figs from his garden smeared with poison by his wife Livia. For this reason, or perhaps because of her horticultural expertise, a variety of fig known as the Liviana was cultivated in Roman gardens.

It was cultivated from Afghanistan to Portugal, also grown in Pithoragarh in the Kumaon hills of India. From the 15th century onwards, it was grown in areas including Northern Europe and the New World. In 1769, Spanish missionaries led by Junipero Serra brought the first figs to California. The Mission variety, which they cultivated, is still popular. The Kadota cultivar is even older, being mentioned by the Roman naturalist Pliny the Elder in the 1st century AD. Pliny recorded thirty varieties of figs.

=== Modern cultivation ===
The common fig is grown for its edible fruit throughout the temperate world. It is also grown as an ornamental tree, and in the UK the cultivars 'Brown Turkey' and 'Ice Crystal' (mainly grown for its unusual foliage) have gained the Royal Horticultural Society's Award of Garden Merit.

Figs are grown in Germany, mainly in private gardens inside built-up areas. There is no commercial fig growing. The Palatine region in the German South West has an estimated 80,000 fig trees. There are about a dozen quite widespread varieties hardy enough to survive winter outdoors mostly without special protection. There are even two local varieties, "Martinsfeige" and "Lussheim", which may be the hardiest varieties in the region.

As the population of California grew, especially after the gold rush, a number of other cultivars were brought there by persons and nurserymen from the east coast of the US and from France and England. By the end of the 19th century, it became apparent that California had the potential for being an ideal fig-producing state because of its Mediterranean-like climate and latitude of 38 degrees, lining up San Francisco with İzmir, Turkey. G. P. Rixford first brought true Smyrna figs to California in 1880. The most popular cultivar of Smyrna-type fig in California is the Turkish Lob Injir, sold under the name Calimyrna (combining "California" and "Smyrna"), which has been grown in Turkey for centuries and was brought to California in the latter part of the 19th century.

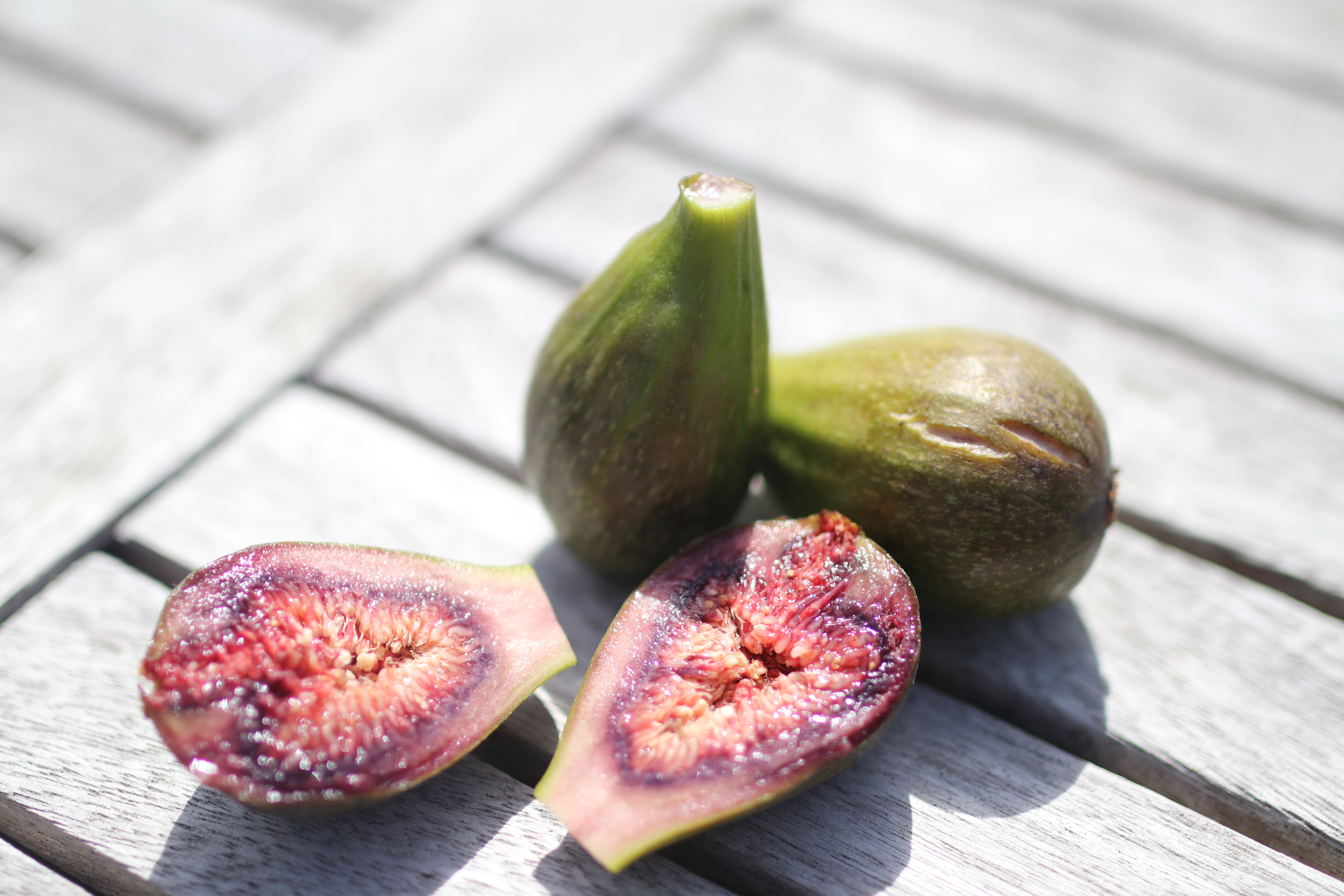
Fresh fig halves on wooden surface

Figs can be found in continental climates with hot summers as far north as Hungary and Moravia. Thousands of cultivars, most named, have been developed as human migration brought the fig to many places outside its natural range. Fig plants can be propagated by seed or by vegetative methods. Vegetative propagation is quicker and more reliable, as it does not yield the inedible caprifigs. Seeds germinate readily in moist conditions and grow rapidly once established. For vegetative propagation, shoots with buds can be planted in well-watered soil in the spring or summer, or a branch can be scratched to expose the bast (inner bark) and pinned to the ground to allow roots to develop.

Two crops can be produced each year. The first or breba crop develops in the spring on last year's shoot growth. The main crop develops on the current year's shoot growth and ripens in the late summer or fall.

There are three types of edible figs:

- Persistent (or common) figs have all female flowers that do not need pollination for fruiting; the fruit can develop through parthenocarpy. This is a popular horticulture fig for home gardeners. Dottato (Kadota), Black Mission, Brown Turkey, Brunswick, and Celeste are some representative cultivars.
- Caducous (or Smyrna) figs require cross-pollination by the fig wasp with pollen from caprifigs for the fruit to mature. If not pollinated, the immature fruits drop. Cultivars include Marabout, Inchàrio, and Zidi.
- Intermediate (or San Pedro) figs set an unpollinated breba crop but need pollination for the later main crop. Examples are Lampeira, King, and San Pedro.

There are dozens of fig cultivars, including main and breba cropping varieties, and an edible caprifig (the Croisic). Varieties are often local, found in a single region of one country.

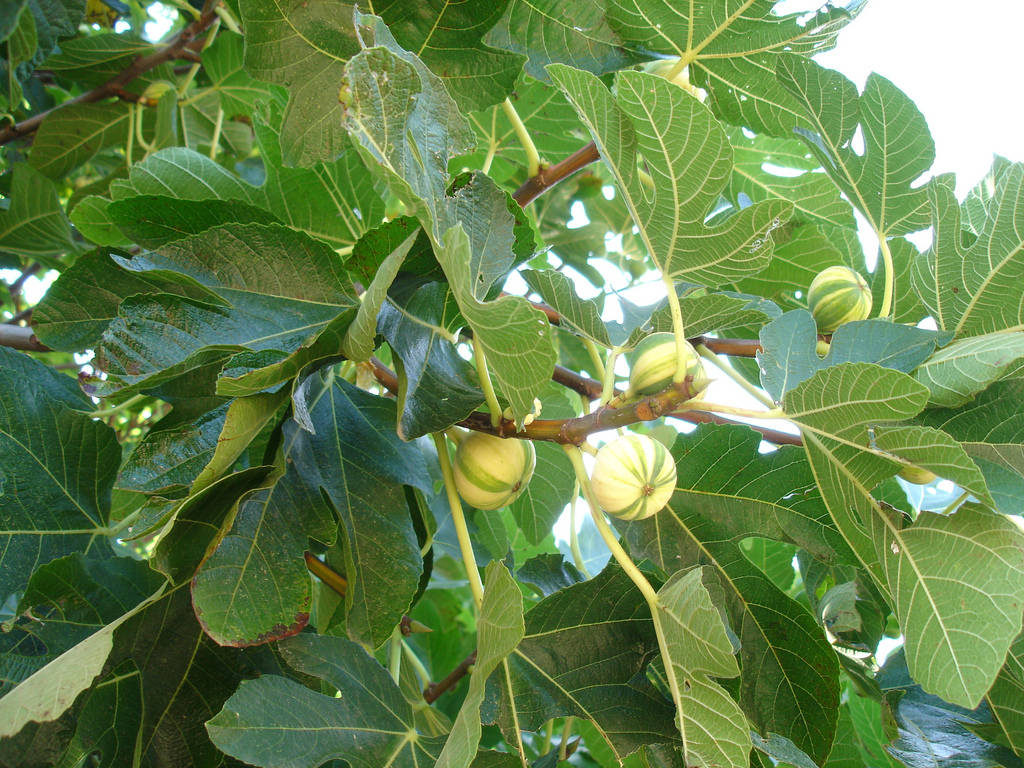
Variegated fig

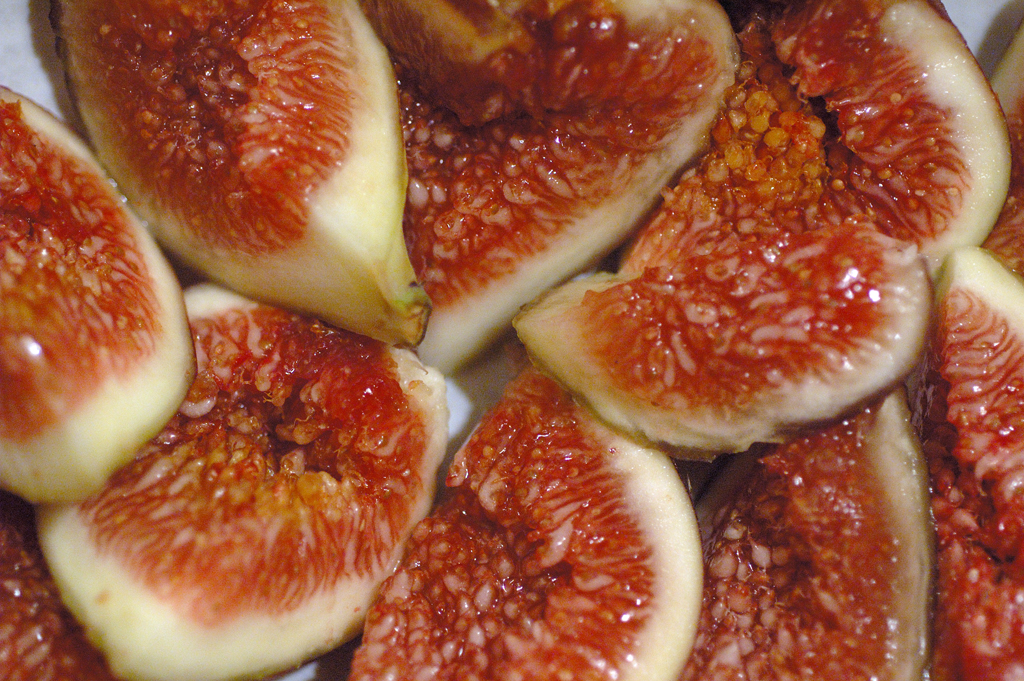
Fresh figs, cut open

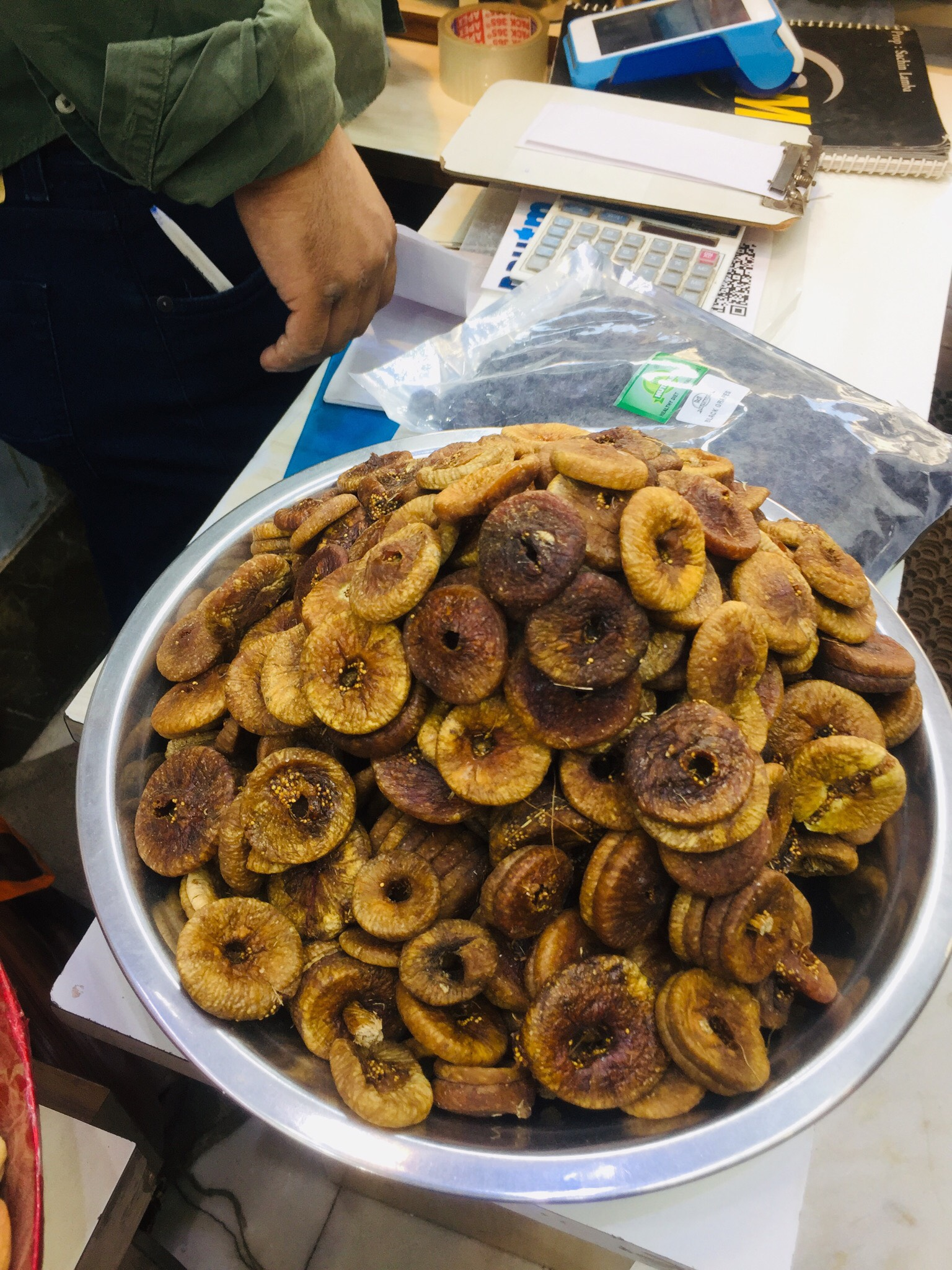
Dry figs, Khari Baoli market, Old Delhi

=== Overwintering ===
People of the Italian diaspora who live in cold-winter climates have the practice of burying imported fig trees to overwinter them and protect the fruiting hard wood from cold. Italian immigrants to America in the 19th century introduced this common practice in cities such as New York, Philadelphia, Boston, and Toronto, where winters are normally too cold to leave the tree exposed. This practice consists in digging a trench that is appropriate to the size of the specimen, some of which are more than 3 m (10 ft) tall, severing part of the root system, and bending the specimen into the trench. Specimens are often wrapped in waterproof material to discourage the development of mold and fungus, then covered with a heavy layer of soil and leaves. Sometimes plywood or corrugated metal is placed on top to secure the tree. In borderline climates like New York City, burying trees is no longer needed because low winter temperatures have increased. Often, specimens are simply wrapped in plastic and other insulating material, or not protected if planted in a sheltered site against a wall that absorbs sunlight.

=== Breeding ===
While there are more naturally occurring varieties of figs than of any other tree crop, a formal fig breeding program was not developed until the beginning of the 20th century. Ira Condit, "High Priest of the Fig," and William Storey tested some thousands of fig seedlings in the early 20th century based at University of California, Riverside. The work they had been doing was later continued at the University of California, Davis. That fig breeding program was closed in the 1980s.

Insect and fungal disease pressure affecting both dried and fresh figs led James Doyle and Louise Ferguson to revive the breeding program in 1989 using the germplasm that Condit and Storey had established. Two varieties from Doyle and Ferguson's program are now in production in California: the public variety "Sierra", and the patented variety "Sequoia".

Fig production – 2024
| Country | (tonnes) |
|---|---|
| Turkey | 375,000 |
| Egypt | 217,194 |
| Algeria | 114,937 |
| Morocco | 106,237 |
| Iran | 75,432 |
| Afghanistan | 59,916 |
| Spain | 55,420 |
| Syria | 33,938 |
| Saudi Arabia | 28,215 |
| United States | 28,174 |
| World | 1,336,541 |
Source: United Nations FAOSTAT

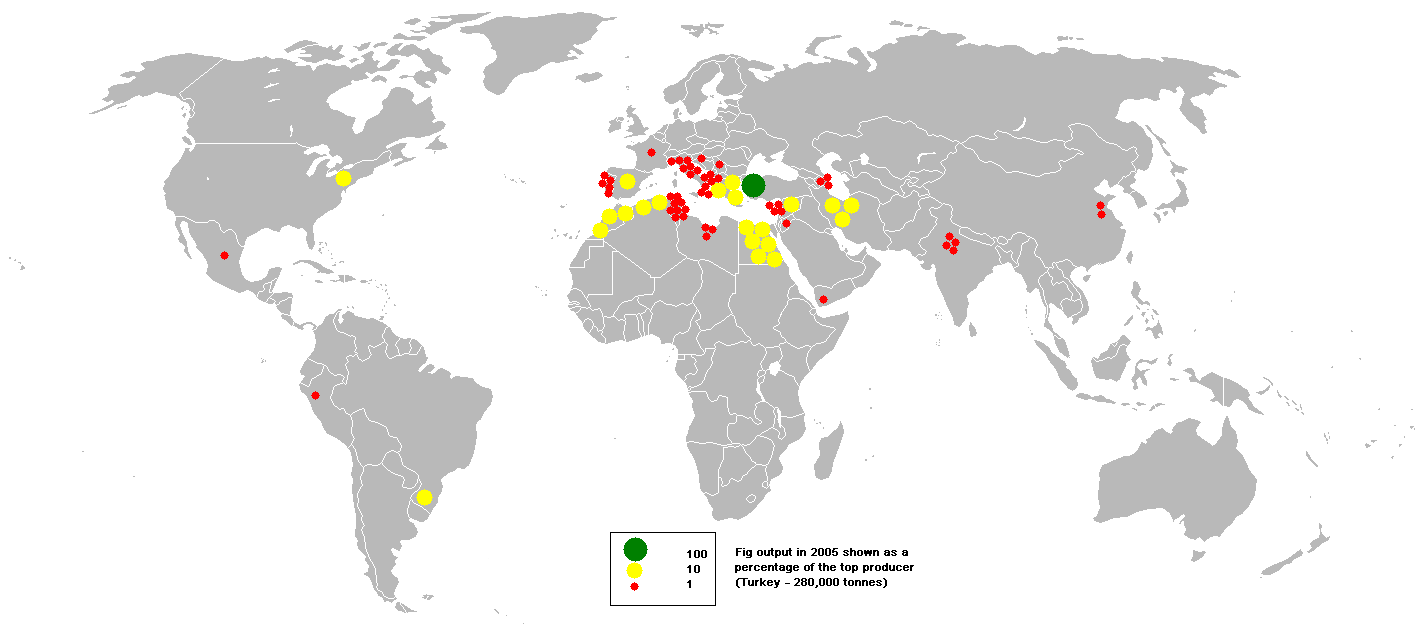
World distribution of fig production (based on 2005 data). Most of the world's figs are grown in the Mediterranean region.

=== Production ===
In 2024, world production of raw figs was 1.34 million tonnes, led by Turkey (with 28% of the world total), Egypt, Algeria and Morocco as the largest producers, collectively accounting for 61% of the total.

== Toxicity ==
Like other plant species in the family Moraceae, contact with the milky sap of F. carica followed by exposure to ultraviolet light can cause phytophotodermatitis, a potentially serious skin inflammation. Although the plant is not poisonous per se, F. carica is listed in the US Food and Drug Administration's database of poisonous plants.

Furanocoumarins cause phytophotodermatitis in humans. The common fig contains significant quantities of two furanocoumarins, psoralen and bergapten. The essential oil of fig leaves contains more than 10% psoralen, the highest concentration of any organic compound isolated from fig leaves. Psoralen and bergapten are found in the milky sap of the leaves and shoots of F. carica but not the fruits. Neither psoralen nor bergapten was detected in the essential oil of fig fruits.

== Uses ==
=== Nutrition ===
Fig, raw
Nutritional value per 100 g (3.5 oz)
- Energy: 310 kJ (74 kcal)
- Carbohydrates: 19.2 g
- Sugars: 16.3 g
- Dietary fiber: 3 g
- Fat: 0.3 g
- Protein: 0.8 g
Vitamins and minerals
| Vitamins | Quantity %DV^{†} |
| Vitamin A equiv. | 1% 7 μg |
| Thiamine (B1) | 5% 0.06 mg |
| Riboflavin (B2) | 4% 0.05 mg |
| Niacin (B3) | 3% 0.4 mg |
| Pantothenic acid (B5) | 6% 0.3 mg |
| Vitamin B6 | 6% 0.1 mg |
| Folate (B9) | 2% 6 μg |
| Vitamin C | 2% 2 mg |
| Vitamin E | 1% 0.11 mg |
| Vitamin K | 4% 4.7 μg |
| Minerals | Quantity %DV^{†} |
| Calcium | 3% 35 mg |
| Iron | 2% 0.4 mg |
| Magnesium | 4% 17 mg |
| Manganese | 6% 0.13 mg |
| Phosphorus | 1% 14 mg |
| Potassium | 8% 232 mg |
| Sodium | 0% 1 mg |
| Zinc | 1% 0.15 mg |
- Other constituents: Quantity
- Water: 79 g
- Link to USDA Database entry
- ^{†}Percentages estimated using US recommendations for adults, except for potassium, which is estimated based on expert recommendation from the National Academies.

Fig, dried, uncooked
Nutritional value per 100 g (3.5 oz)
- Energy: 1,041 kJ (249 kcal)
- Carbohydrates: 63.9 g
- Sugars: 47.9 g
- Dietary fiber: 9.8 g
- Fat: 0.93 g
- Protein: 3.3 g
Vitamins and minerals
| Vitamins | Quantity %DV^{†} |
| Vitamin A equiv. | 0% 0 μg |
| Thiamine (B1) | 7% 0.085 mg |
| Riboflavin (B2) | 6% 0.082 mg |
| Niacin (B3) | 4% 0.62 mg |
| Pantothenic acid (B5) | 9% 0.43 mg |
| Vitamin B6 | 6% 0.11 mg |
| Folate (B9) | 2% 9 μg |
| Vitamin C | 1% 1 mg |
| Vitamin E | 2% 0.35 mg |
| Vitamin K | 13% 15.6 μg |
| Minerals | Quantity %DV^{†} |
| Calcium | 12% 162 mg |
| Iron | 11% 2 mg |
| Magnesium | 16% 68 mg |
| Manganese | 22% 0.51 mg |
| Phosphorus | 5% 67 mg |
| Potassium | 23% 680 mg |
| Sodium | 0% 10 mg |
| Zinc | 5% 0.55 mg |
- Other constituents: Quantity
- Water: 30 g
- Link to USDA Database entry
- ^{†}Percentages estimated using US recommendations for adults, except for potassium, which is estimated based on expert recommendation from the National Academies.

Raw figs are 79% water, 19% carbohydrates, 1% protein, and contain negligible fat. They are a moderate source (14% of the Daily Value, DV) of dietary fiber and 310 kilojoules (74 kcal) of food energy per 100-gram serving, and do not supply essential micronutrients in significant contents.

When dehydrated to 30% water, figs have a carbohydrate content of 64%, protein content of 3%, and fat content of 1%. In a 100-gram serving, providing 1,041 kJ (249 kcal) of food energy, dried figs are a rich source (more than 20% DV) of dietary fiber and the essential mineral manganese (26% DV), while calcium, iron, magnesium, potassium, and vitamin K are in moderate amounts.

In fig fruits, the levels of glucose and fructose are nearly identical, with glucose slightly more prevalent overall, while the presence of sucrose is minimal. Still, in some varieties of figs, the fructose content can occasionally slightly surpass that of glucose.

=== Culinary ===
Figs can be eaten fresh or dried, and used in jam-making. Most commercial production is in dried or otherwise processed forms, since the ripe fruit does not transport or keep well. In the Northern Hemisphere, fresh figs are in season from August through to early October. Fresh figs used in cooking should be plump and soft, and without bruising or splits. If they smell sour, the figs have become over-ripe. Slightly under-ripe figs can be kept at room temperature for 1–2 days to ripen before serving. Figs are most flavorful at room temperature.

Freshly harvested figs can undergo two distinct drying methods for preservation. The first method is natural sun-drying, where figs are exposed to the warmth and light of the sun. The second method involves oven-drying, where figs are placed in a controlled temperature environment within an oven. Each process has its unique impact on the texture and flavor profile of the dried figs.

=== Folk medicine ===
In some old Mediterranean folk practices, the milky sap of the fig plant was used to soften calluses, remove warts, and deter parasites. Since the late 1800s, syrup of figs combined with senna has been used as a laxative. Figs have been thought to be aphrodisiac, whether because they may encourage sexual arousal or because their shape suggests female genitalia.

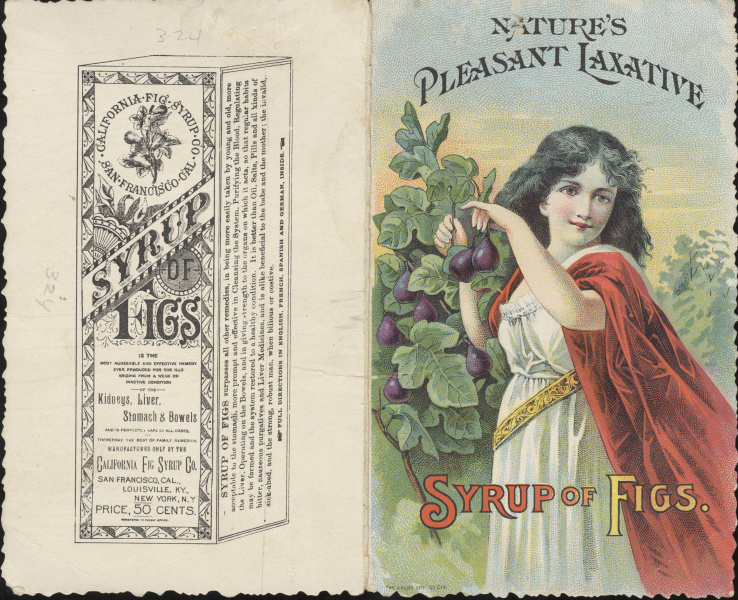
Fig syrup has been used as a laxative.

== In culture ==
In Babylonian mythology, Ishtar took the form of the divine fig tree Xikum, the "primeval mother at the central place of the earth", protectress of the saviour Tammuz. Moreover, figs and the fig tree were closely linked with female sexuality. According to Barbara Walker's encyclopedia on Goddess symbols, "This may account for the common use of the fig tree as a symbol of man's enlightenment, which was formerly supposed to come through his connection with the female principle."

In Ancient Greece c. 590 BC, the Athenian statesman Solon made a law prohibiting the export of figs from Attica. The fig came to be prized in Ancient Greece as a mark of their civilisation, in contrast to the barbarian Medes "who know neither wine nor figs".

Figs have significance in several religions. In Buddhism, Gautama Buddha attained enlightenment (bodhi) after meditating underneath a Ficus religiosa, the bodhi tree, for seven weeks (49 days) around 500 BC. The site of enlightenment is in present-day Bodh Gaya and its bodhi tree has been replaced several times. In Islam, Surah 95 of the Qur'an is named al-Tīn (Arabic for "The Fig"), as it opens with the oath "By the fig and the olive." In Christianity and Judaism, figs appear in the Book of Genesis, where Adam and Eve clad themselves with fig leaves (Genesis 3:7) after eating the forbidden fruit from the tree of the knowledge of good and evil. Likewise, fig leaves, or depictions of fig leaves, have long been used to cover the genitals of nude figures in painting and sculpture. According to the opinion of Rabbi Nehemya in the Talmud, the Tree of Knowledge in the Garden of Eden was a fig tree. Figs are also one of the Shivat Haminim, or seven species that are considered special products of the land of Israel. There is a Christian tradition that the Tree of Knowledge was the same fig tree that Christ withers in the Gospels.

The obligate mutualism between the fig and the fig wasp presents a unique dietary dilemma for strict vegetarians, vegans, and adherents of Jainism. Because in natural pollination female wasps die inside the syconium, the resulting fruit contains the digested matter of an insect. While some vegans accept traditional figs on the premise that the wasp's death is a naturally occurring event, strict Jains often reject them. To cater to these markets, fig growers sometimes use parthenocarpy. Parthenocarpic cultivars develop ripe fruit without insect pollination.

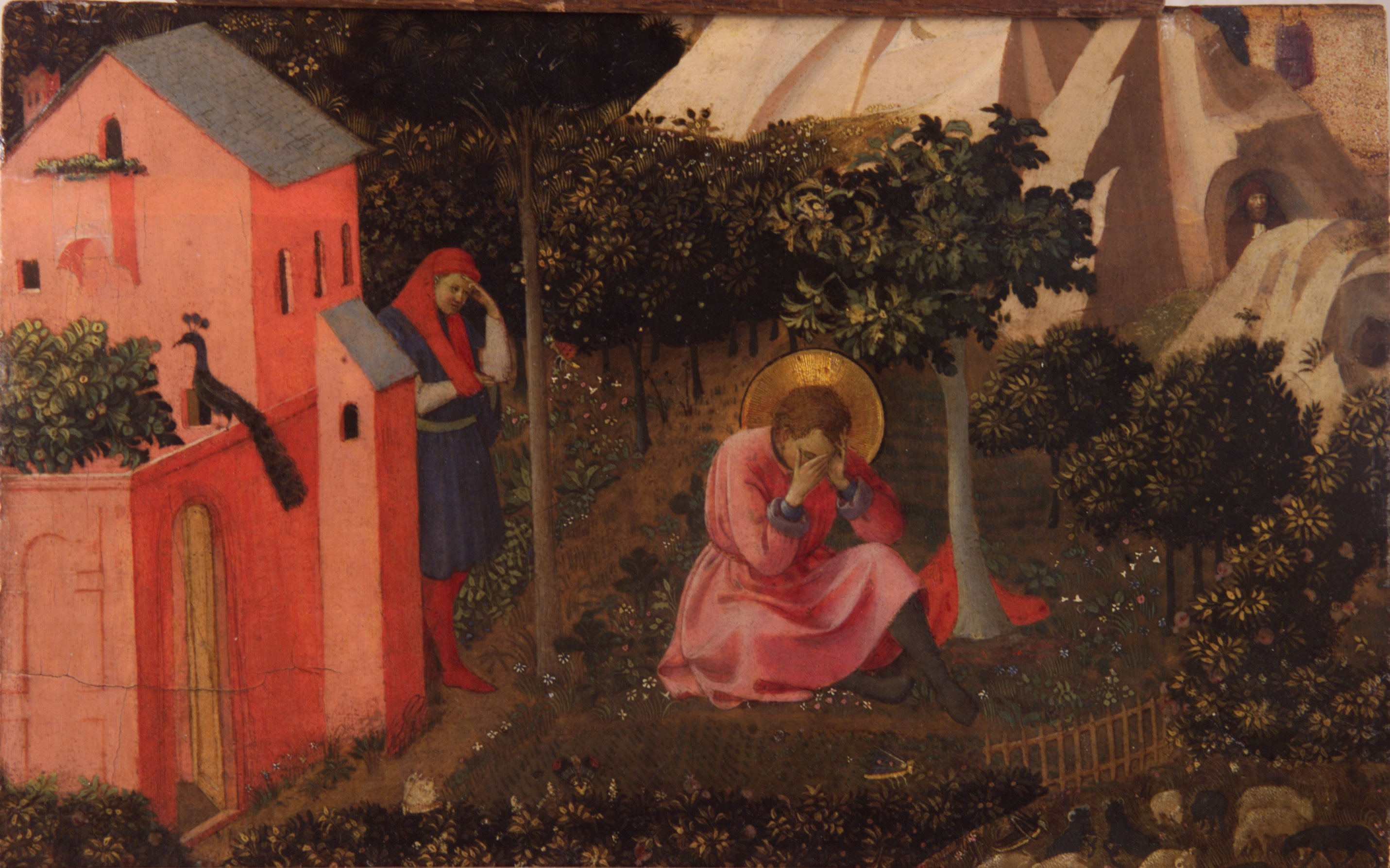
Conversion of Saint Augustine by Fra Angelico, c. 1395–1455

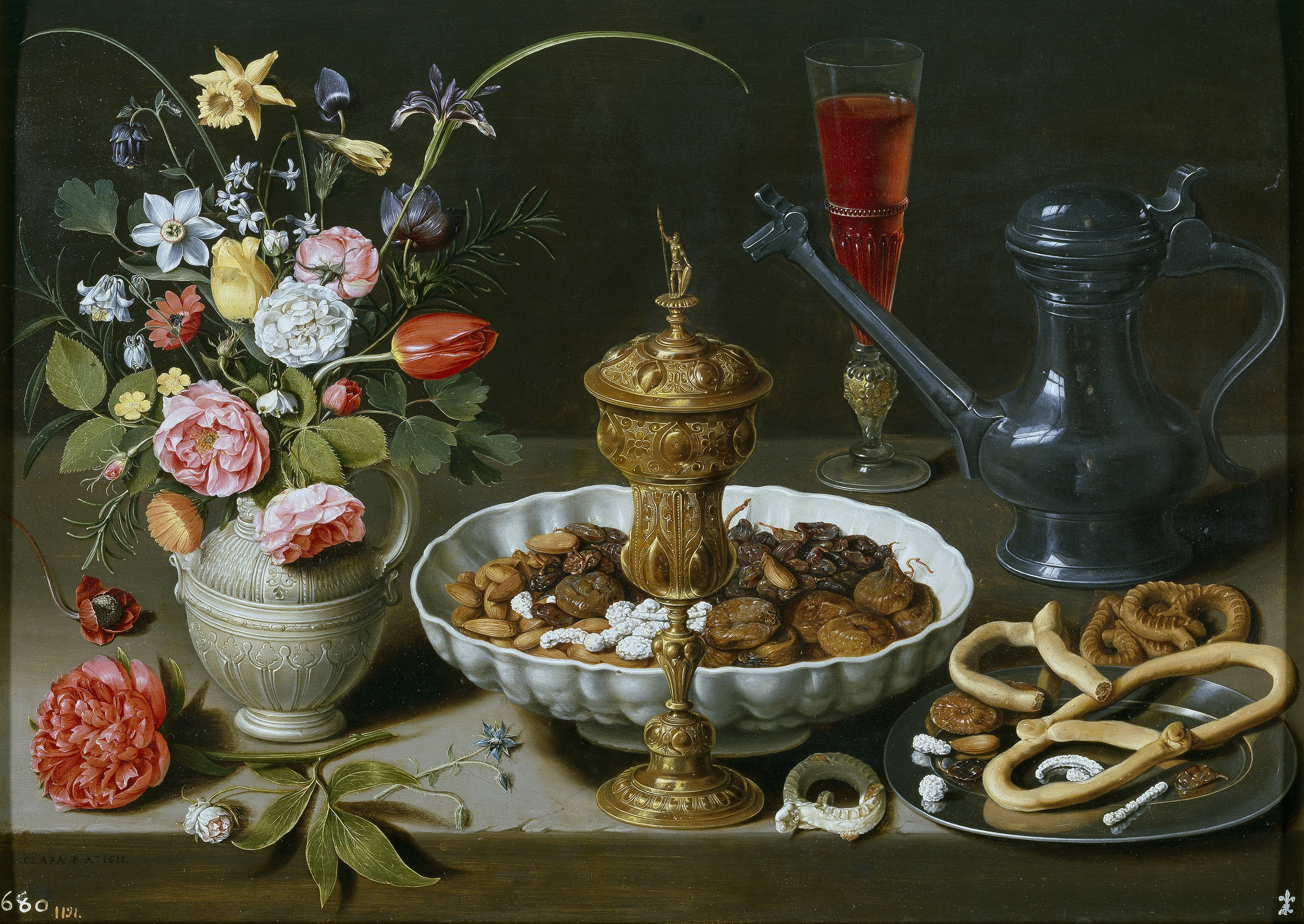
Still life Mesa ("Table") with dried figs and other fruits in a bowl by Clara Peeters, 1611

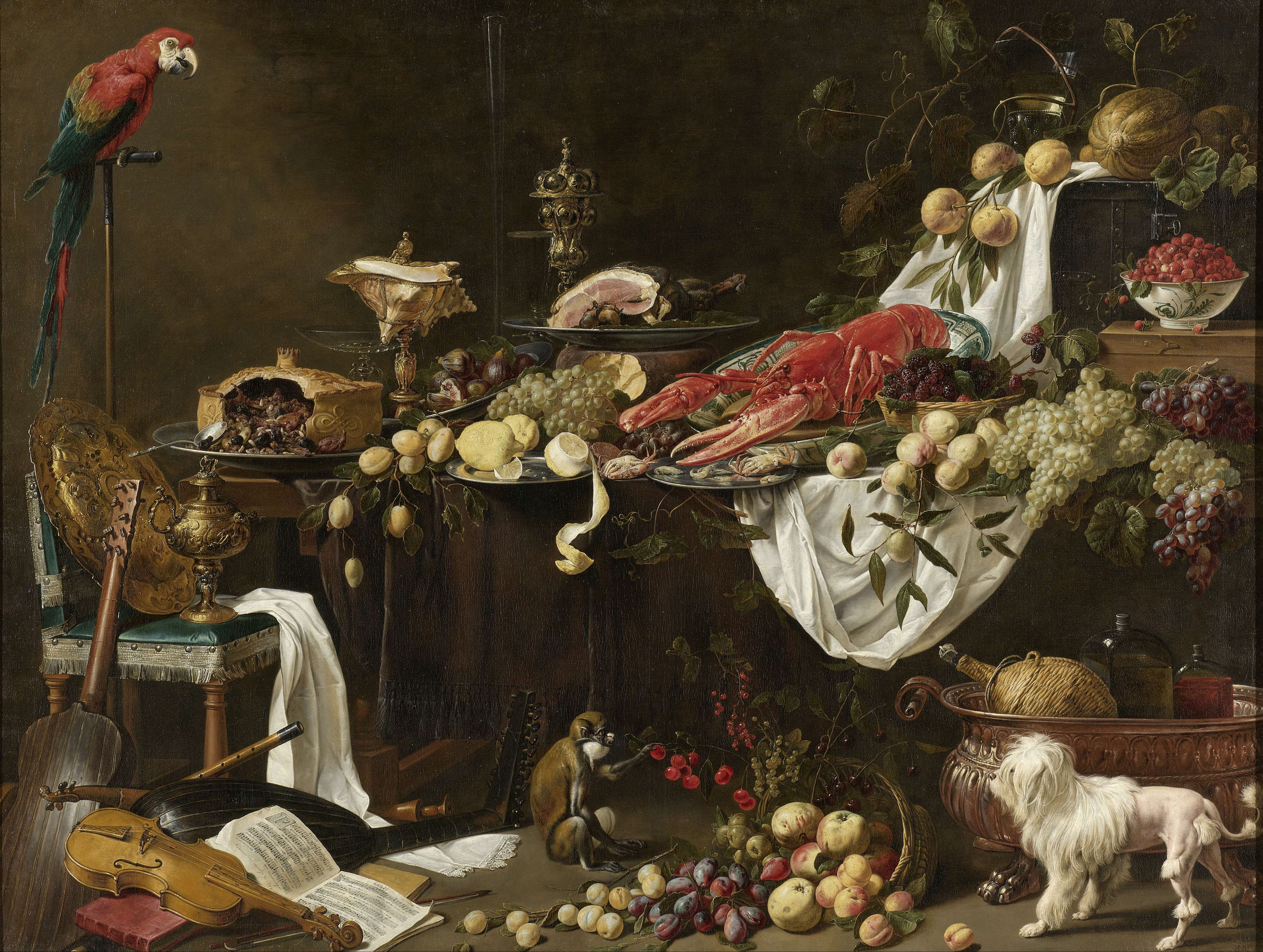
Banquet Still Life, Adriaen van Utrecht, 1644

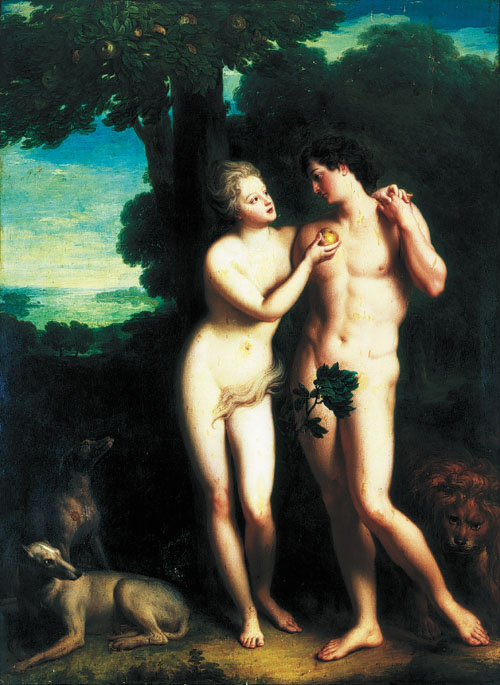
Fig leaves have been used to cover the genitals in artworks, as in Jean Baptiste Santerre's 1717 Adam and Eve in the Garden of Eden.

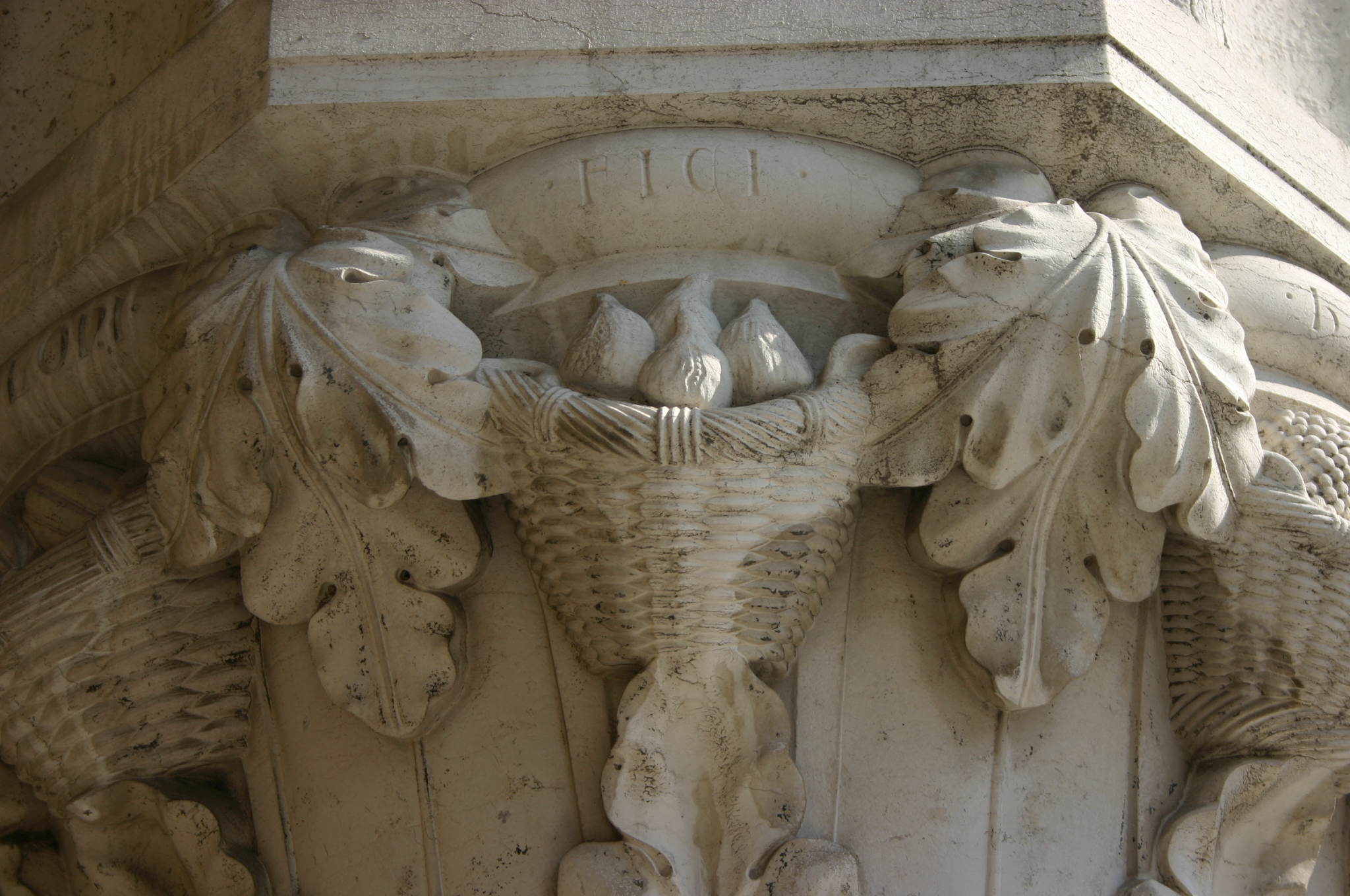
Basket of figs in sculptural detail of the Bridge of Sighs, Doge's Palace, Venice, 1600

== See also ==
- Cursing of the fig tree
- Fig cake
- Fig sign
- Grocer's itch
- List of foods with religious symbolism
