= 50th Brigade =

50th Brigade or 50th Infantry Brigade may refer to:

== Greece ==
- 50th Mechanized Infantry Brigade (Greece)

== India ==
- 50th Indian Brigade of the British Indian Army in the First World War
- 50th Parachute Brigade (India)
- 50th Indian Tank Brigade

== Russia/Soviet Union ==
- 50th Separate Operational Brigade

== United Kingdom ==
- 50th Brigade (United Kingdom)
- 50th Light Anti-Aircraft Brigade (United Kingdom)
- 50th (South African) Brigade, Royal Garrison Artillery

== United States ==
- 50th Infantry Brigade Combat Team (United States)

== See also ==
- 50th Division (disambiguation)
- 50th Regiment (disambiguation)
