= 50th Wing =

50th Wing may refer to:

- 50th Space Wing
- 50th Troop Carrier Wing, active from 1941 to 1946
