= 50 Squadron =

50 Squadron or 50th Squadron may refer to:

- 50 Squadron, former designation of the 201 Squadron, Portugal
- 50 Squadron SAAF, a unit of the South African Air Force
- No. 50 Squadron IAF, Indian Air Force
- No. 50 Squadron PAF, Pakistan Air Force
- No. 50 Squadron RAF, a former unit of the United Kingdom Royal Air Force
- No. 50 Squadron RSAF, Royal Saudi Air Force

== United States ==
- 50th Airlift Squadron
- 50th Education Squadron
- 50th Fighter-Bomber Squadron
- 50th Flying Training Squadron
- 50th Military Airlift Squadron
- 50th Operations Support Squadron, 50th Operations Group
- 50th Space Communications Squadron

== See also ==
- 50th Wing (disambiguation)
