= Fleshy fruit =

Fruit with a fleshy pericarp

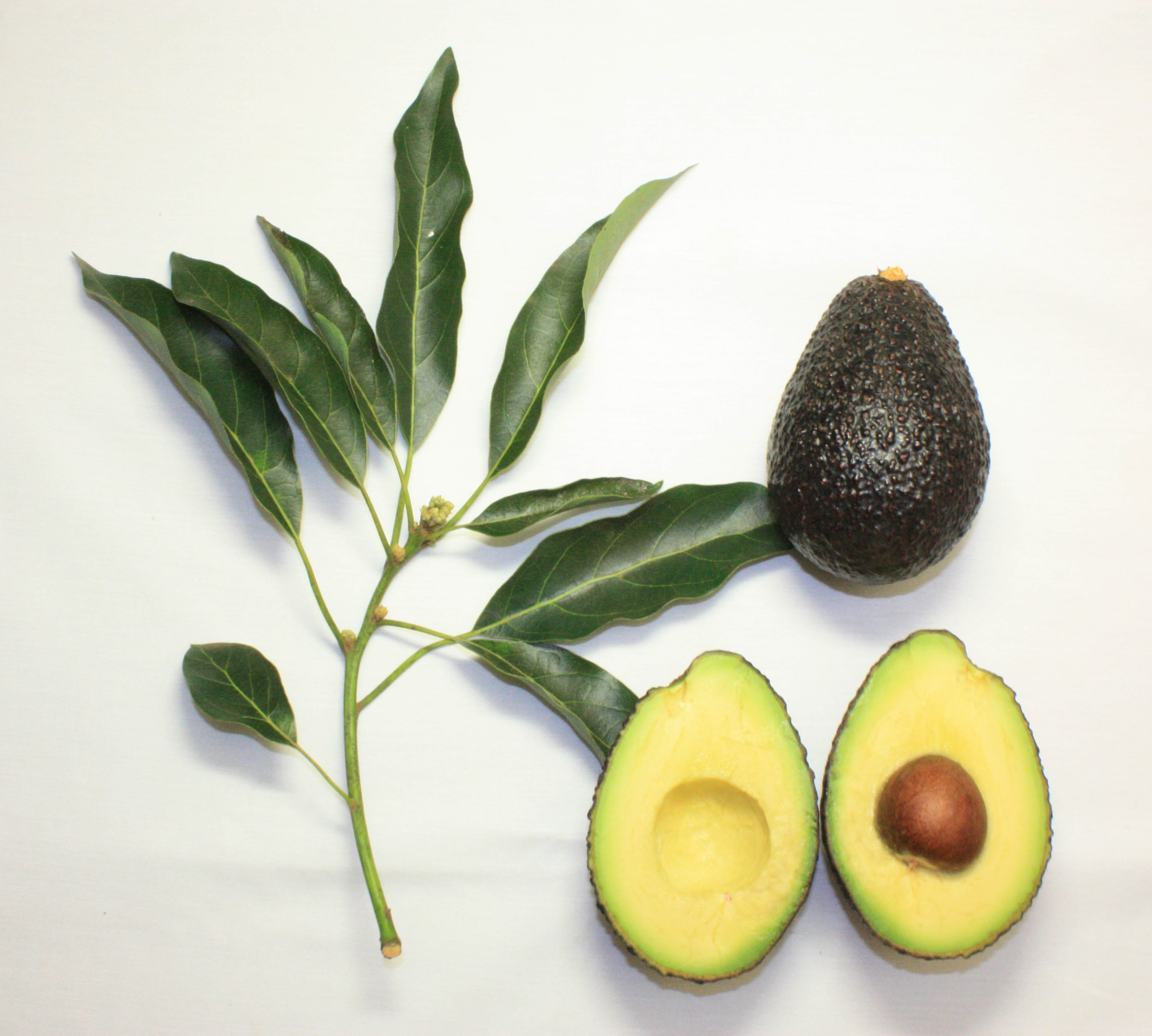
An avocado, a berry with a fleshy interior, a single seed and a thin soft endocarp

In botany, fleshy fruits are fruits which are fleshy and brightly coloured, making them attractive to animals which eat them and disperse the seeds. The word 'succulent fruit' is synonymous to fleshy fruit and both words are often used interchangeably.

Fruits can be classed as fleshy fruits or dry fruits based on their pericarp. Anatomically, fleshy fruits have a fleshy pericarp which is divided in three layers: an outermost exocarp or epicarp, a middle mesocarp and the innermost endocarp.

== Classification ==
Fleshy fruits can be classed into simple and compound fruits.

Simple fleshy fruits include berries, drupes and accessory fruits. Berries generally have many seeds, which include bananas and gooseberries. In contrast, drupes typically only have a single stone or pip, which includes peaches and mangoes. Accessory fruits, also known as false fruits or pseudocarps, develop from the ovary as well as other parts of the flower like receptacle. Simple fruits can also develop from flowers having compound ovaries.

Compound fruits include aggregate fruits and multiple fruits. Aggregate fruits like raspberries develop from multiple ovaries in a single flower. While multiple fruits like figs develop from ovaries from a cluster of multiple flowers called an inflorescence.

== Anatomy ==
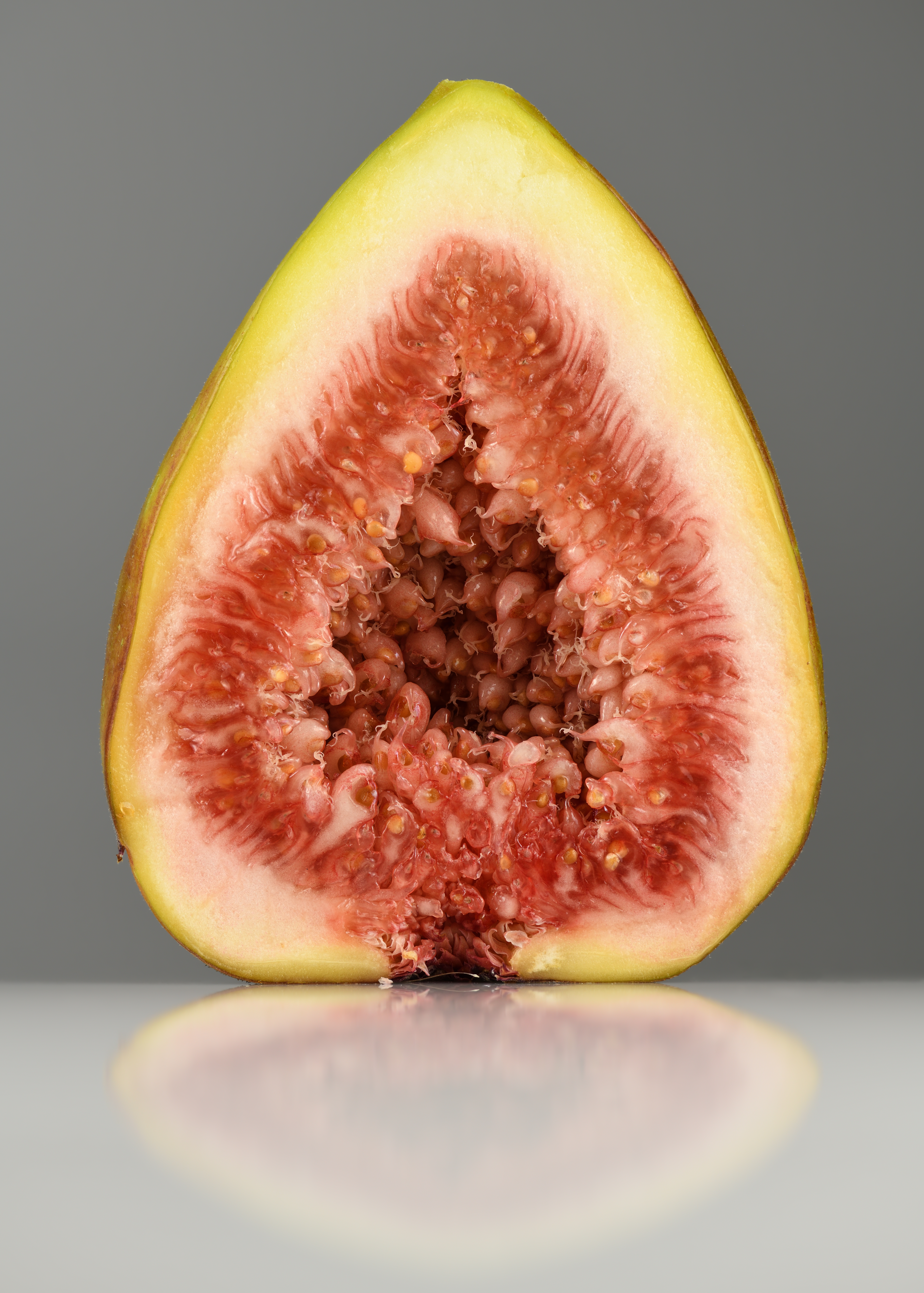
The fruits of a fig are on the inside of the pseudocarp.

In fleshy or succulent fruits, the three layers of the pericarp are clearly distinguishable, unlike dry fruits. These layers vary in thickness in different kinds of fleshy fruits, and may also merge into one another during development. In hesperidium, a group of berries which include citrus fruits, the leathery exocarp and white mesocarp make up the peel, in which the exocarp is known as flavedo or zest and mesocarp is known as albedo. While in pepo, a group of berries including melons and cucumbers, the exocarp fuses with the receptacle to form the rind, and mesocarp and endocarp make up the flesh. Lychees have a single seed surrounded by a fleshy aril and a pericarp forming the peel.

Aggregate fruits like raspberries have a receptacle as the core, little fruits (drupelets) surround the core, each drupelet has an exocarp forming the peel, mesocarp forming the flesh and the hard endocarp surrounding the pips.

Accessory fruits like syconium, a group of false fruits including figs, have a fleshy infolded receptacle, the flowers are on the inside of the pseudocarp, which develop into drupelets of the fig. Flesh in pome, a group of false fruits including apples, is mostly formed by the swollen receptacle and the fused exocarp and mesocarp, the endocarp makes up a film which surrounds the core and seeds. The edible flesh in strawberries is also a swollen receptacle with the dry fruits embedded on the outside.
