= Pandanus erectus =

Species of flowering plant

Pandanus erectus a species of plant in the family Pandanaceae. It is native to Madagascar, described growing in secondary forest in the Maroantsetra area of NE Madagascar. Some references list Pandanus concretus as the accepted name, with Pandanus centrifugalis, P. dauphinensis, P. erectus and P. madagascarensis as synonyms.

Pandanus erectus is described as a 15 m tall tree with an erect dark brown trunk 25 cm in diameter with short, conic spines. The trunk remains unbranched almost to the top. Branches are few and strictly ascending. Prop roots are few, spiny, light brown and about 1.5 cm wide, 20 cm long. Leaves are 3.2-3.25 m long, 15–16 cm wide rigid and erect, but outer ones frequently break and then hang down. Fruiting clusters develop at branch tips and are usually made up of 10 complex fruits (syncarps) attached in three rows.
