= Pandanus dauphinensis =

Scientific classification
- Kingdom: Plantae
- Clade: Tracheophytes
- Clade: Angiosperms
- Clade: Monocots
- Order: Pandanales
- Family: Pandanaceae
- Genus: Pandanus
- Species: P. dauphinensis

Binomial name
- Pandanus dauphinensis Martelli

Species of plant

Pandanus dauphinensis a species of plant in the family Pandanaceae. It is native to coastal southeast Madagascar. Some references list Pandanus concretus as the accepted name, with numerous synonyms, including Pandanus centrifugalis, P. dauphinensis, P. erectus and P. madagascarensis. Panadus dauphinensis has cylindric complex fruits (syncarps) 18–20 cm long, and relatively broad leaves 12 cm or more in width with strong cross veining on the upper surface, including near the tip.
