= Dry fruits =

Fruits with a hard, dry pericarp

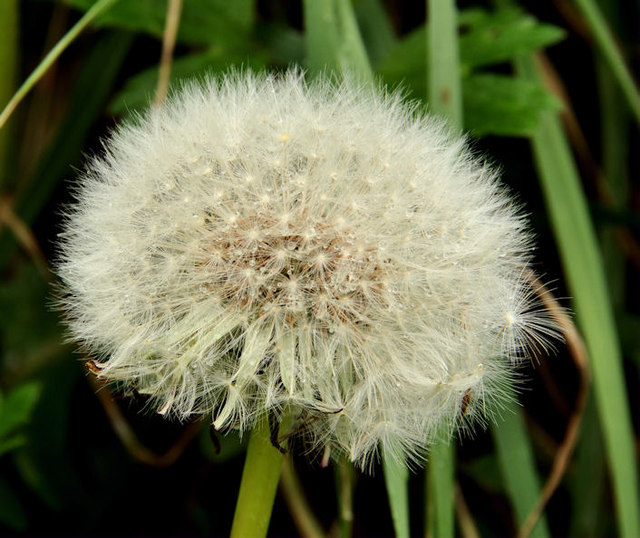
Dandelion fruits are achenes which are dispersed by wind aided by a 'parachute'.

In botany, dry fruits are fruits which have a hard, dry pericarp around their seeds, these commonly disperse via wind with help of 'wings' and 'parachutes' or via animals with help of hooks which latch on animal fur or when seeds are consumed by the animals. They are different from fleshy fruits based on their dry pericarp, in which the exocarp, mesocarp and endocarp are not clearly distinguishable from each other.

In common language, dry fruits may also refer to dried fruits and nuts.

== Classification ==
Dry fruits can be classed into dehiscent, indehiscent and schizocarpic dry fruits.

In dehiscent dry fruits, the pericarp splits open to release the seeds, these include capsules, follicles and legumes. While in indehiscent dry fruits, the pericarp does not split open and seeds generally dispersed by wind or animals, these include nuts, achenes, caryopses, samaras and nutlets. In schizocarps, the fruit splits open but the seeds are not released, these include cremocarps and double samaras.

== Anatomy ==
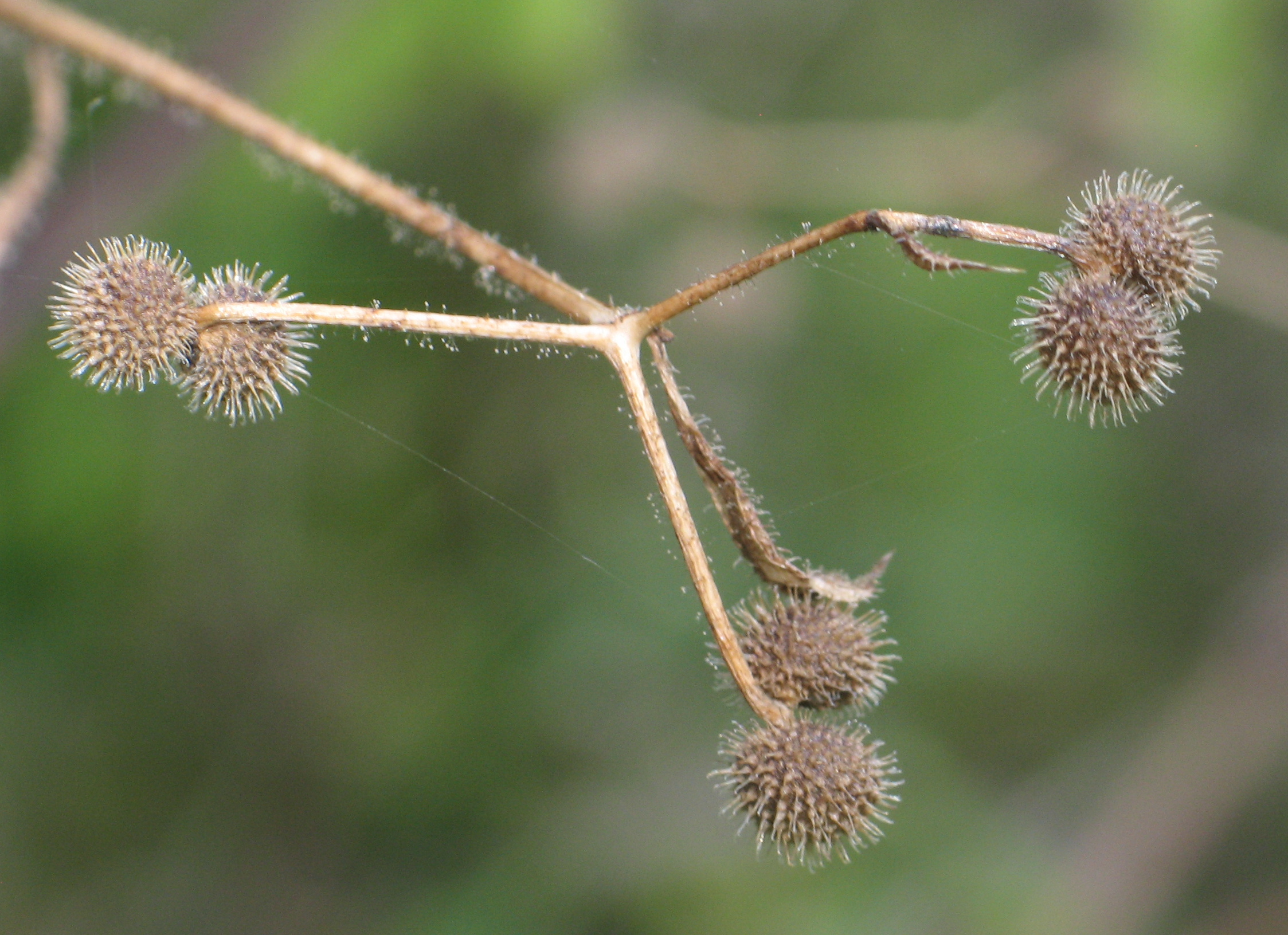
Cleaver fruits are a kind of indehiscent nutlets which are hooked for seed dispersal.

Dehiscent dry fruits like legumes, including peas, generally have a thin pericarp around all the seeds, which are attached to the placenta by a funicle, these split open after they are matured and the seeds are scattered. Capsules, like love-in-a-mist, develop from fused carpels. Follicles, like larkspur, develop from a single carpel and have two seeds.

Indehiscent dry fruits like nuts, including chestnuts, have a husk or shell formed from bracts which does not split open to release the seeds. Although strawberries are accessory fruits, they are covered in small achenes, which are single-seeded dry fruits.

Schizocarps like cremocarps, which includes hogweed, have a flattened pericarp and both carpels of the fruit separate into mericarps (half-fruits) without exposing the seeds. Double samaras, like maples, have two mericarps, each having a wing and a seed.
