= Accessory fruit =

Botanical category of fruit

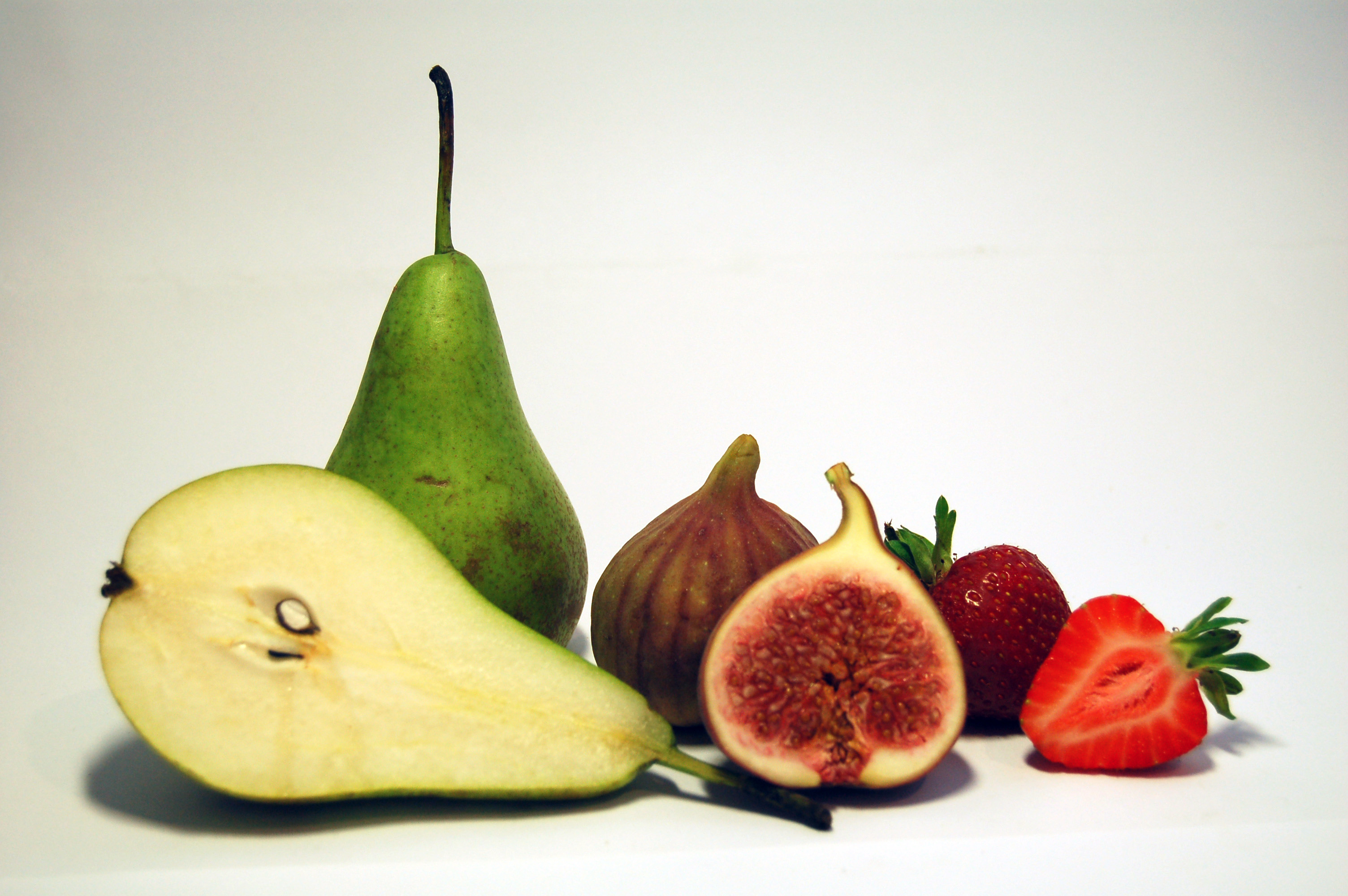
A selection of accessory fruits (from left to right: pear, fig, and strawberry)

An accessory fruit is a fruit that contains tissue derived from plant parts other than the ovary. In other words, the flesh of the fruit develops not from the floral ovary, but from some adjacent tissue exterior to the carpel (for example, from receptacles or sepal). As a general rule, the accessory fruit is a combination of several floral organs, including the ovary. In contrast, true fruit forms exclusively from the ovary of the flower.

Accessory fruits are usually indehiscent, meaning that they do not split open to release seeds when they have reached maturity.

== Incorporated organs ==
The following are examples of accessory fruits listed by the plant organ from which the accessory tissue is derived:

Accessory Fruit Organs
Organ	Fruit
Hypanthium	Apple, Pear, Rose hip, Loquat, Quince
Involucre	Pineapple
Peduncle	Cashew apple
Perianth	anthocarps of the Nyctaginaceae
Receptacle	Fig, Mulberry, Pineapple, Strawberry
Calyx	Eastern teaberry, Rose apple

Fruit with fleshy seeds, such as pomegranate or mamoncillo, are not considered to be accessory fruits.

== Examples ==
=== Apples and pears ===
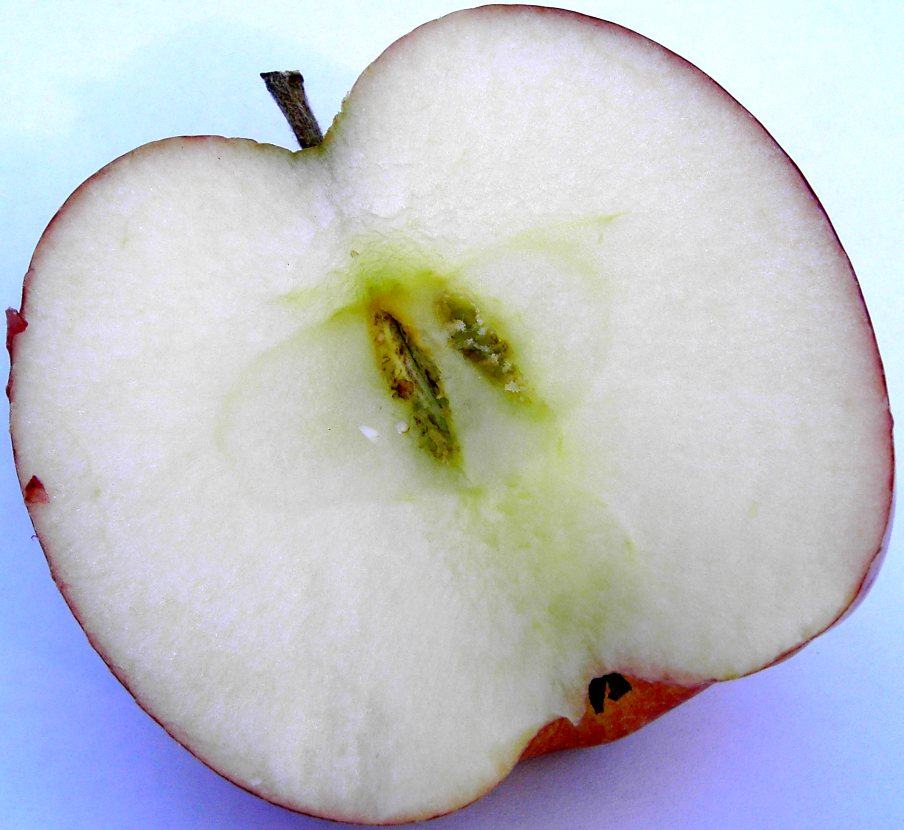
Apple section, showing seeds plus papery expression of the ovary, surrounded by tissue formed from ripening of the hypanthium.

The part of apples and pears that is consumed is the hypanthium. The ovary is the papery core that surrounds the apple seeds. As the hypanthium ripens it forms the edible tissues.

=== Roses ===
For roses, the hypanthium is the tissue that composes the edible part of rosehips. Roses and apples are both members of the Rosaceae family; the fact that they have similar fruit morphology is a major consideration in placing them in the same taxonomic family.

=== Strawberries ===
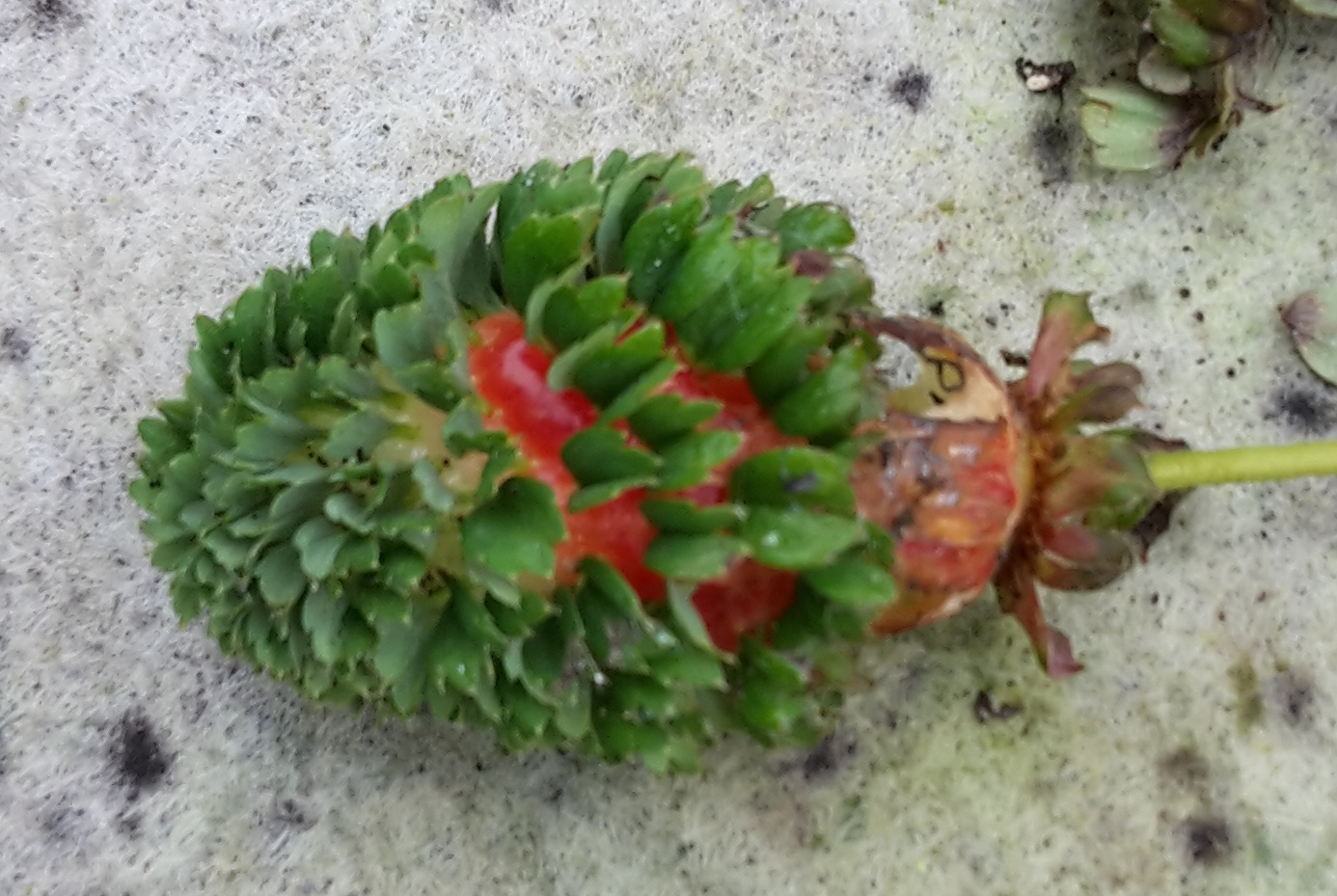
On this strawberry, the many pips located on the surface have grown into leafy structures rather than seeds in a phenomenon known as phyllody. The pips of the strawberry are its true fruit.

The edible part of the strawberry is formed, as part of the ripening process, from the receptacle of the strawberry flower. The true fruits (hence, containing the seeds) are the roughly 200 pips (which are, technically, achenes, a true fruit that contains a single seed from a single ovary). These pips dot the exterior of the strawberry.

=== Cashew apple ===
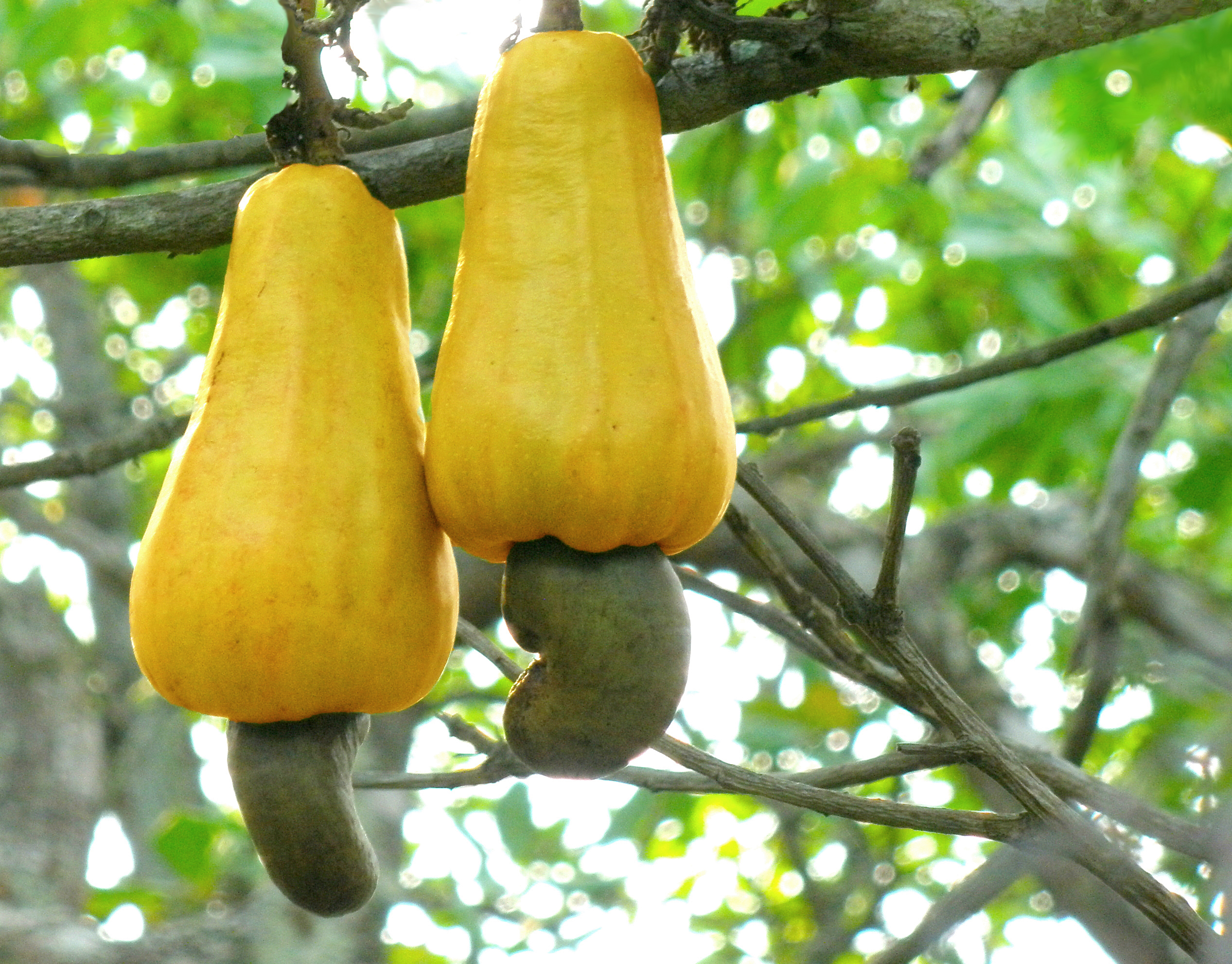
The cashew 'apple' and its attached drupe, which contains the edible seed.

The cashew apple is an oval- or pear-shaped structure that develops from the pedicel and the receptacle of the cashew flower and is technically called a hypocarpium. It ripens into a yellow or red structure about 5–11 cm (2–4 1/4 in) long. The true fruit of the cashew tree is a kidney–shaped drupe that grows at the end of the cashew apple; the seed inside this drupe is the cashew nut of commerce.

=== Pineapple ===
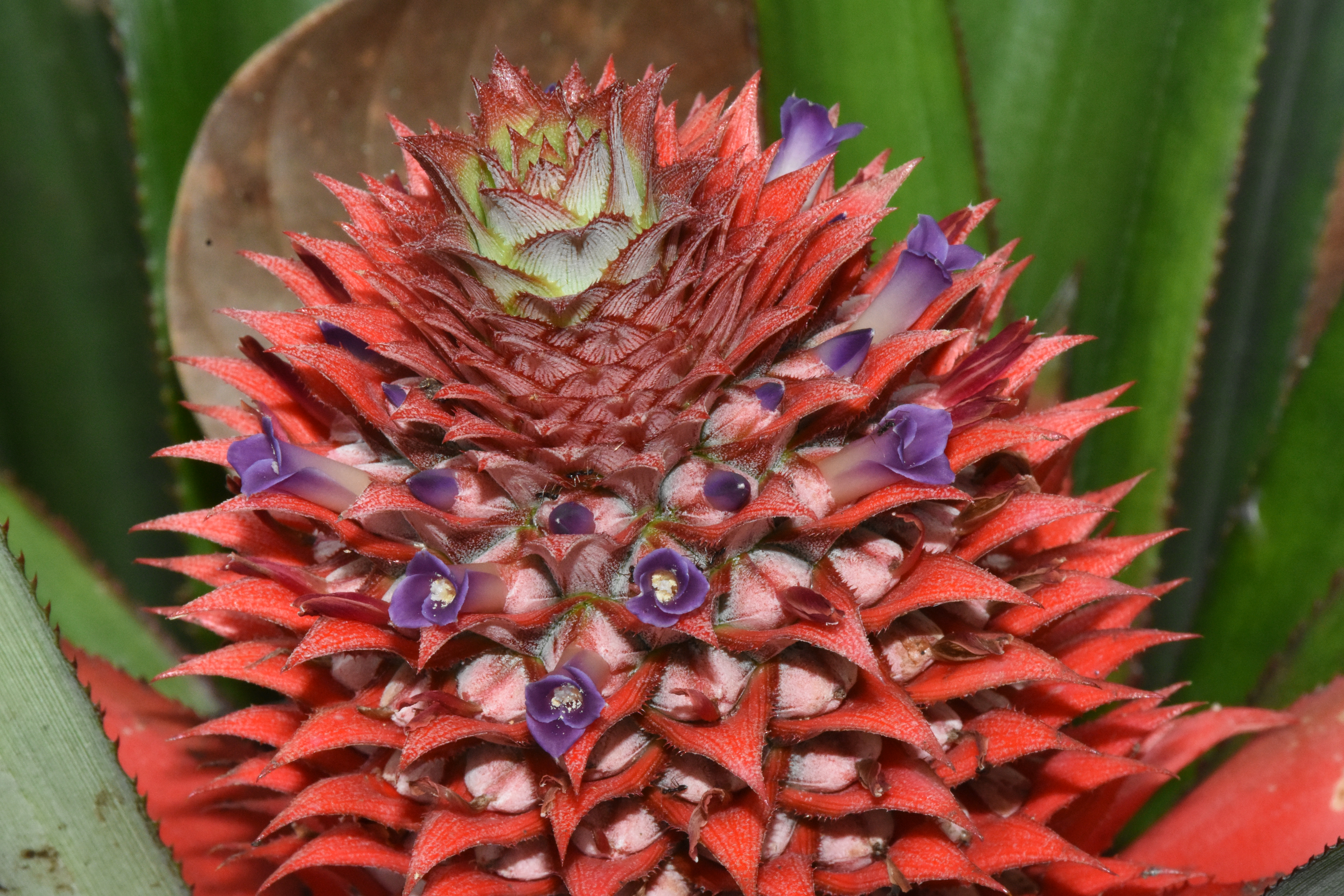
Pineapple in flower

The pineapple is formed when 50 to 200 unpollinated flowers coalesce in a spiral arrangement— the flowers form individually and then fuse as a single 'multiple fruit'. The ovaries develop into berries and the fruit forms around an intercalary spike. The intercalary inflorescence (cluster of flowers) results when the terminal cluster of flowers are left behind by the growth of the main axis of the plant. Each polygonal area on the pineapple's surface is an individual flower.

== Research ==
Current research has proposed that a single class of genes may be responsible for regulating accessory fruit formation and ripening. A study using strawberries concluded that hormone signaling pathways involving gibberellic acid and auxin affect gene expression, and contribute to the initiation of accessory fruit development. Metabolic modifications in different developing accessory fruit tissues are due to the varied distributions of compounds such as triterpenoids and steroids.

== See also ==
- Aggregate fruit
- Compound fruit
- Multiple fruit
