= Aggregate fruit =

Category of fruit

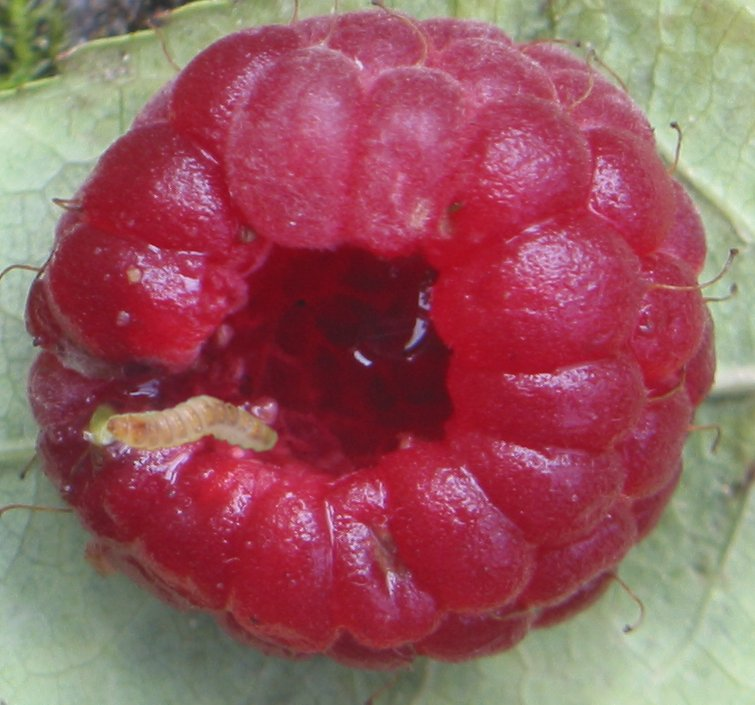
A raspberry fruit (shown with a raspberry beetle larva) is an aggregate fruit, an aggregate of drupelets.

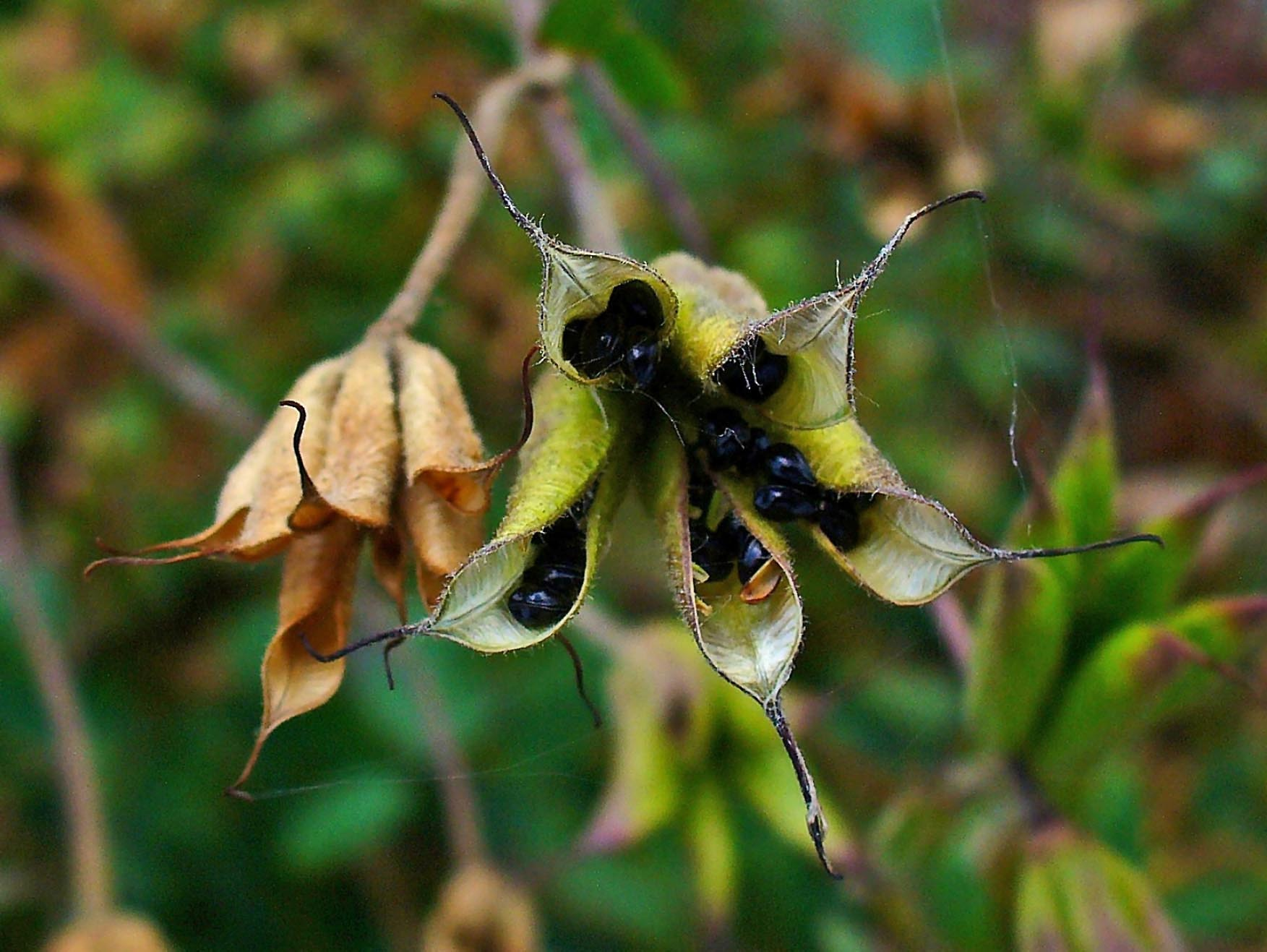
The fruit of an Aquilegia flower is one fruit that forms from several ovaries of one flower, and it is an aggregate of follicles. However, because the follicles are not fused to one another, it is not considered an aggregate fruit.

An aggregate fruit or etaerio (/ɛ.ˈtɪər.i.oʊ/) is a fruit that develops from the merger of several ovaries that were separated in a single flower. In contrast, a simple fruit develops from one ovary, and a multiple fruit develops from multiple flowers. In languages other than English, the meanings of "aggregate" and "multiple" fruit are reversed, so that "aggregate" fruits merge several flowers. The differences in meaning are due to a reversal in the terminology by John Lindley, which has been followed by most English-language authors.

Not all flowers with multiple ovaries form aggregate fruit; the ovaries of some flowers do not become tightly joined to make a larger fruit. As a result, many fruits form which are commonly mistaken to be of the aggregate variety. Aggregate fruits may also be accessory fruits, in which parts of the flower other than the ovary become fleshy and form part of the fruit.

The individual parts of an aggregate fruit come in many forms. Common examples are:

- Drupelets:
  - Raspberry
  - Dewberry and blackberry, also an accessory fruit, with a fleshy receptacle
- Achenes:
  - Strawberry, also an accessory fruit, with a fleshy receptacle
  - Ranunculus
- Follicles:
  - Magnolia
- Samaras:
  - Liriodendron tulipifera

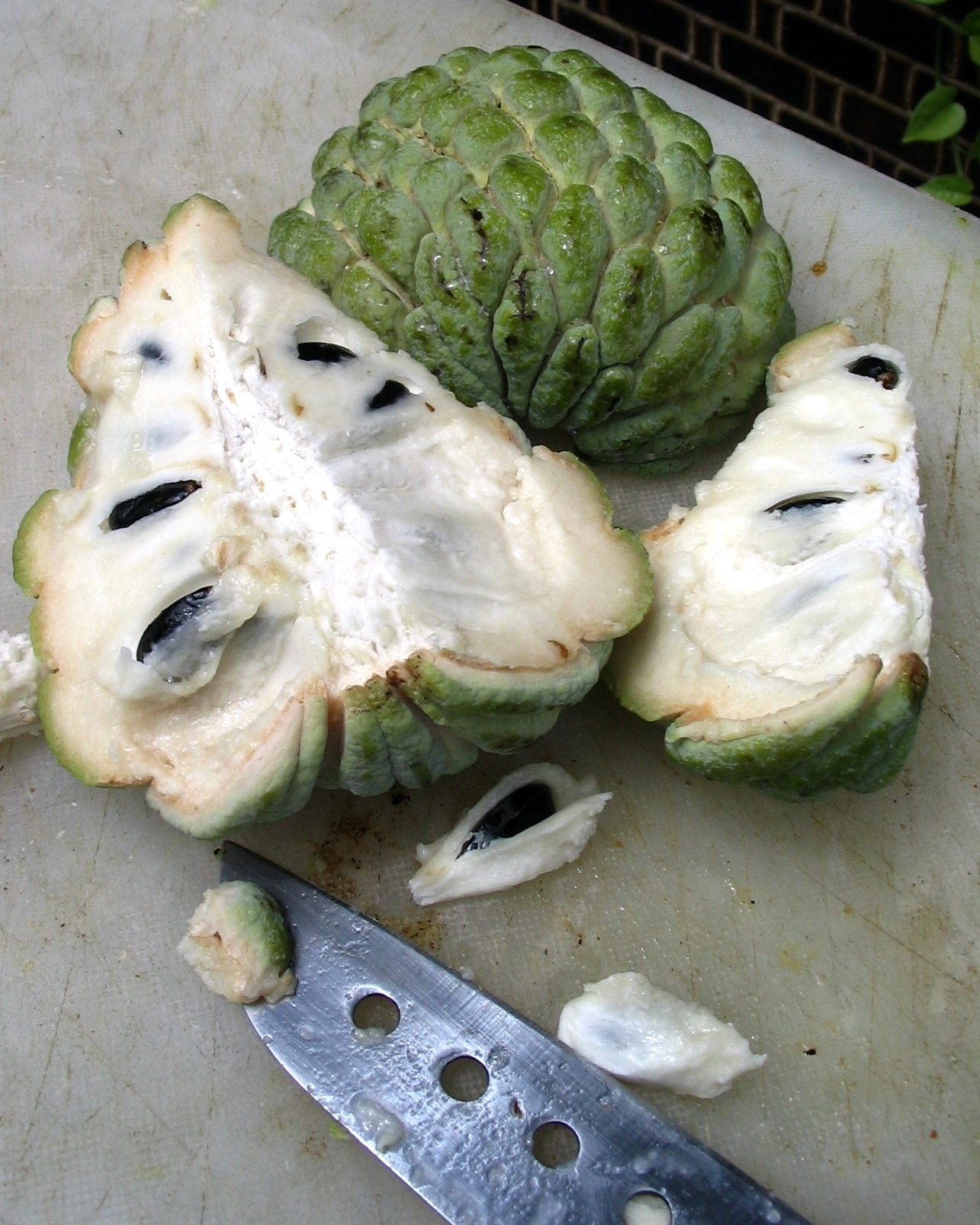
A sugar apple fruit forms from the pistils and receptacle of one flower.

The components of other aggregate fruit are more difficult to define. For example, sugar apple (Annona spp.) fruit are made up of individual berry-like pistils fused with the receptacle.

== See also ==
- Multiple fruit, a structure formed from the ovaries of several flowers, that can resemble an aggregate fruit
- Compound fruit, a term sometimes used when it is not clear whether a fruit is an aggregate fruit, a multiple fruit, or a simple fruit formed from a compound ovary
- Accessory fruit, a fruit in which some of the flesh is derived from tissue exterior to the carpel
- Carpel, the "building blocks" of the ovary
