= Drupe =

Fleshy fruit with hard inner layer (endocarp or stone) surrounding the seed

Diagram of a typical drupe (peach), showing both fruit and seed

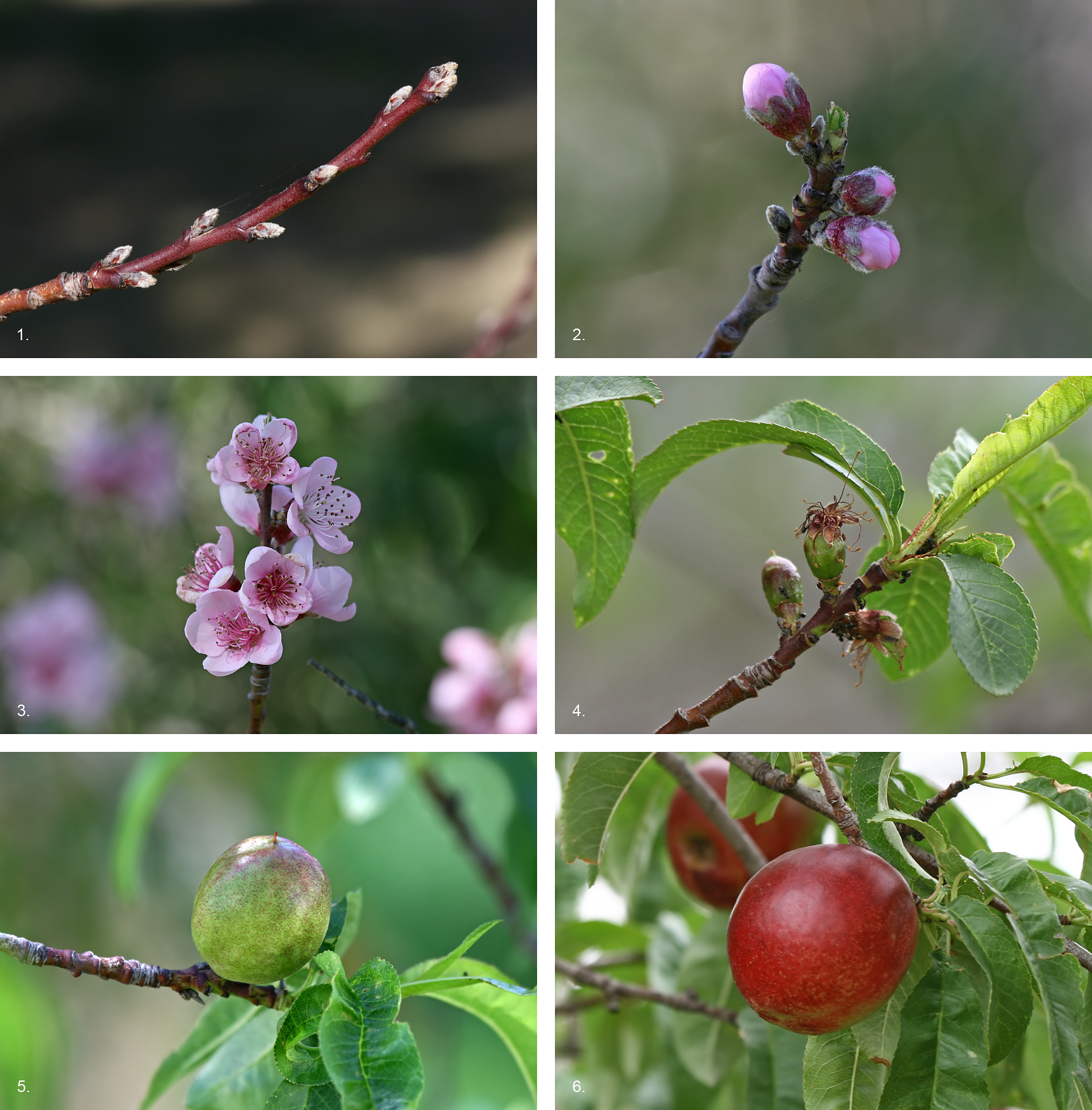
The development sequence of a typical drupe, a smooth-skinned (nectarine) type of peach (Prunus persica) over a 7 1/2-month period, from bud formation in early winter to fruit ripening in midsummer

In botany, a drupe, or stone fruit, is a type of fruit in which an outer fleshy part (exocarp, or skin, and mesocarp, or flesh) surrounds a single shell (the pit, stone, or pyrena) of hardened endocarp with a seed (kernel) inside. Drupes do not split open to release the seed, i.e., they are indehiscent. These fruits usually develop from a single carpel, and mostly from flowers with superior ovaries (polypyrenous drupes are exceptions).

The definitive characteristic of a drupe is that the hard, woody (lignified) stone is derived from the ovary wall of the flower. In an aggregate fruit, which is composed of small, individual drupes (such as a raspberry), each individual is termed a drupelet, and may together form an aggregate fruit. Such fruits are often termed berries, although botanists use a different definition of berry. Other fleshy fruits may have a stony enclosure that comes from the seed coat surrounding the seed, but such fruits are not drupes.

Flowering plants that produce drupes include coffee, jujube, mango, olive, most palms (including açaí, date, sabal and oil palms), pistachio, white sapote, cashew, and all members of the genus Prunus, including the almond, apricot, cherry, damson, peach, nectarine, and plum.

The term drupaceous is applied to a fruit having the structure and texture of a drupe but not precisely fitting the definition of drupe.

== Description ==
The boundary between a drupe and a berry is not always clear. Thus, some sources describe the fruit of species from the genus Persea, which includes the avocado, as a drupe; others describe the avocado as a berry. One definition of berry requires the endocarp to be less than 2 mm (3/32 in) thick, other fruits with a stony endocarp being drupes. In marginal cases, terms such as drupaceous or drupe-like are sometimes used.

A freestone is a drupe with a stone that can easily be removed from the flesh. A clingstone is a drupe with a stone which cannot easily be removed from the flesh. A tryma is a nut-like drupe. Hickory nuts (Carya) and walnuts (Juglans), in the Juglandaceae family, grow within an outer husk; these fruits are technically drupes or drupaceous nuts, not true botanical nuts.

Many drupes, with their sweet, fleshy outer layer, attract the attention of animals as food, and the plant benefits from the resulting dispersal of its seeds.

== Examples ==
Typical drupes include apricots, olives, loquat, peaches, plums, cherries, mangoes, pecans, and amlas (Indian gooseberries). Other examples include sloe (Prunus spinosa) and ivy (Hedera helix).

The coconut is a drupe, its mesocarp a dry or fibrous husk, its endocarp a hard shell.

Bramble fruits such as the blackberry and the raspberry are aggregates of drupelets. The fruit of blackberries and raspberries comes from a single flower whose pistil is made up of a number of free carpels. However, mulberries, which closely resemble blackberries, are not aggregates but multiple fruits.

Some drupes occur in clusters, as in palms. Examples include dates, Jubaea chilensis in central Chile and Washingtonia filifera in the Sonoran Desert of North America.

Many gymnosperms like cycads, ginkgos and some cypresses have drupe-like "fruits".

== Gallery ==
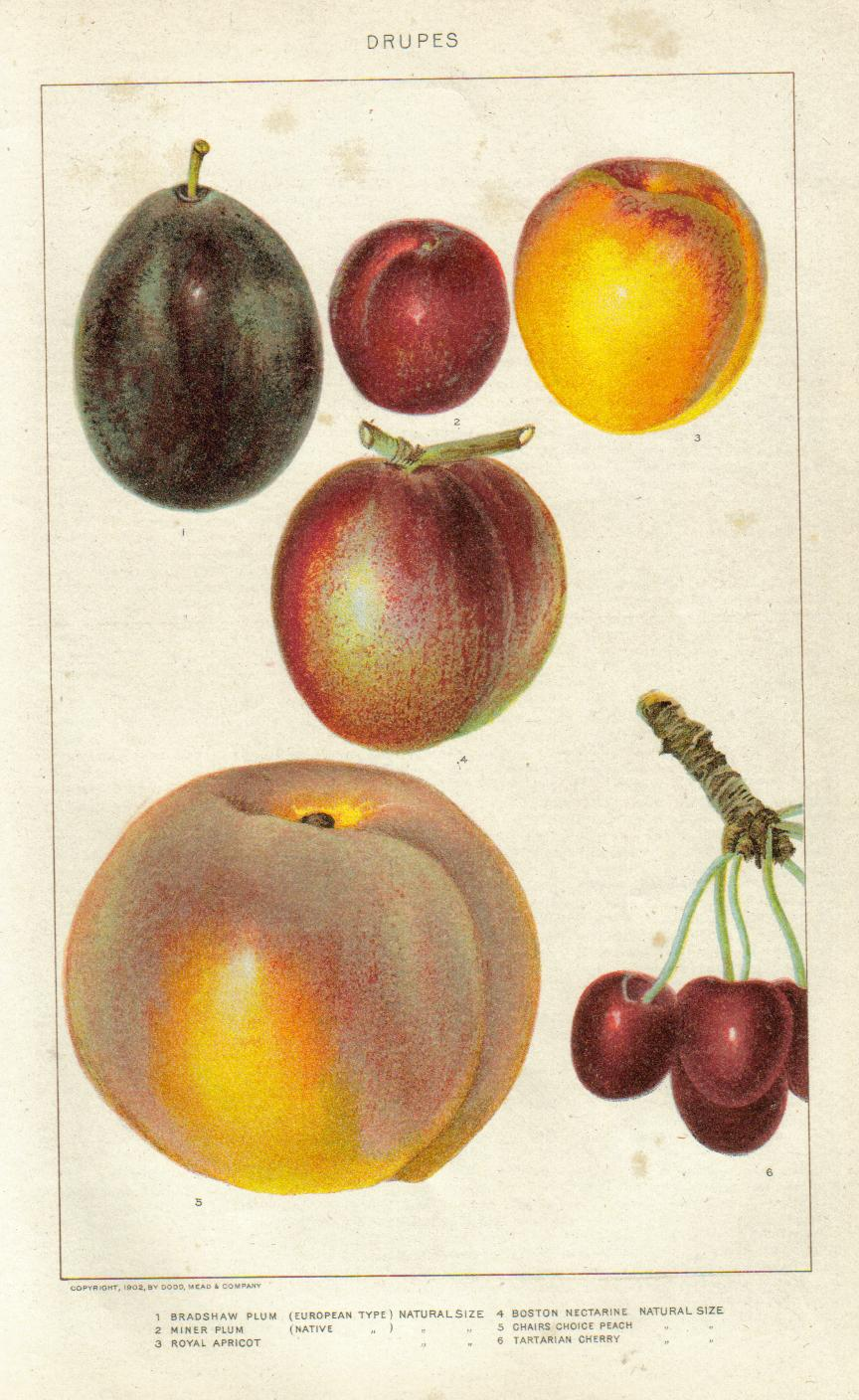
Assorted drupes

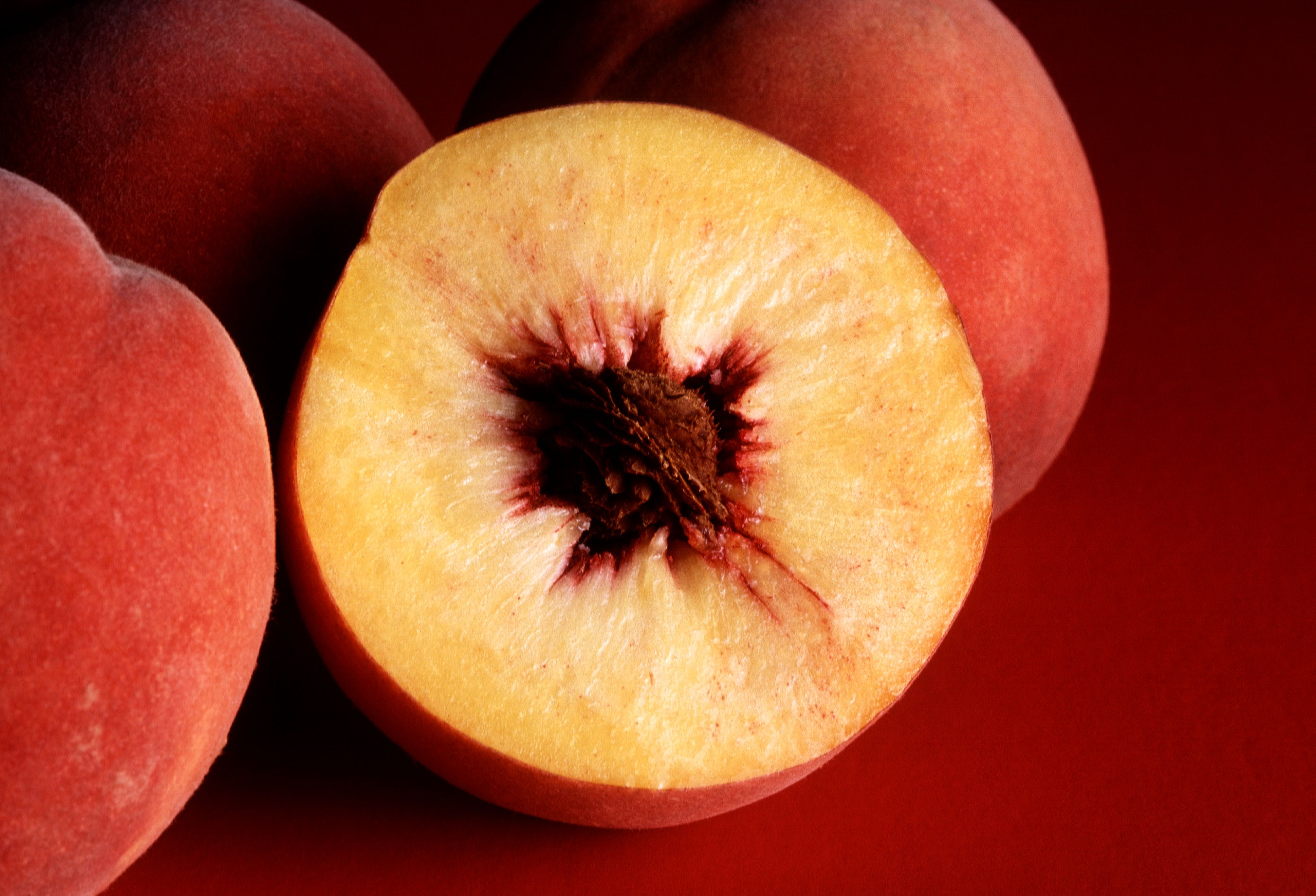
The peach is a typical drupe (stone fruit).

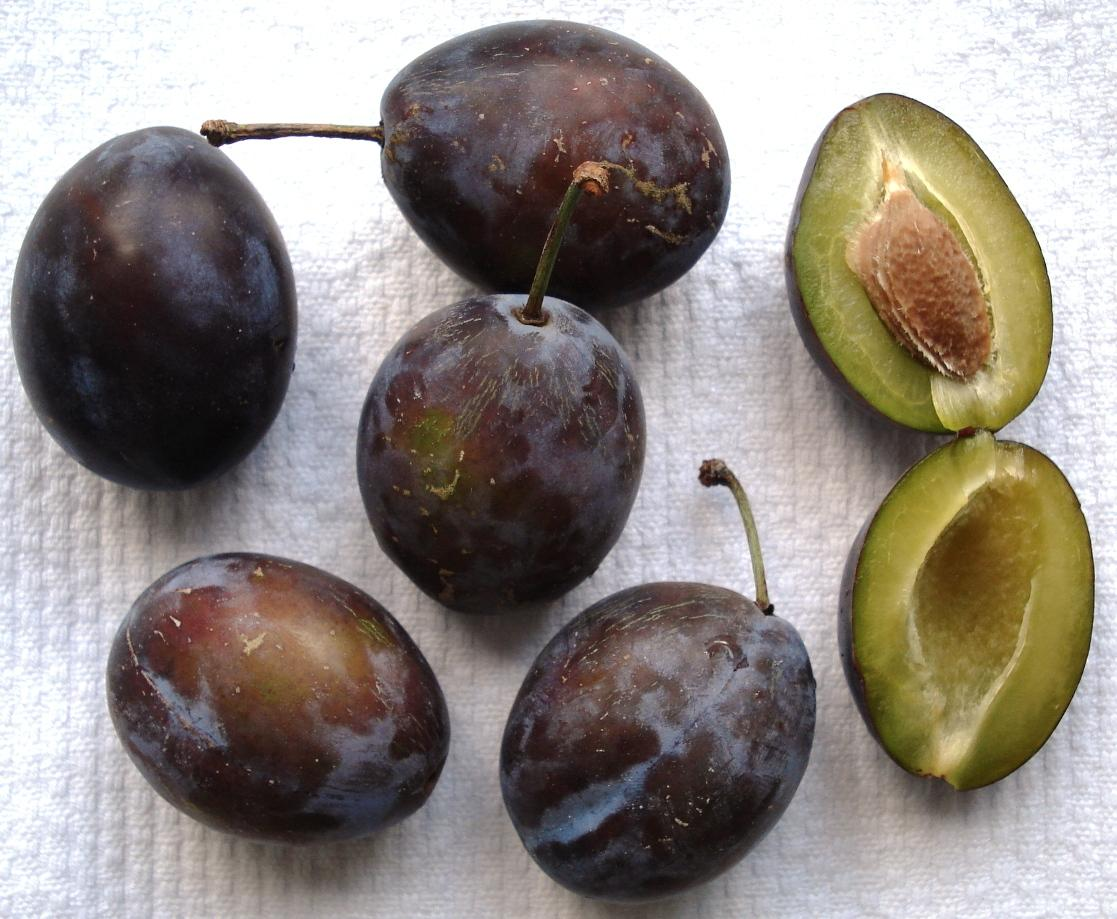
'Elena', a freestone prune plum

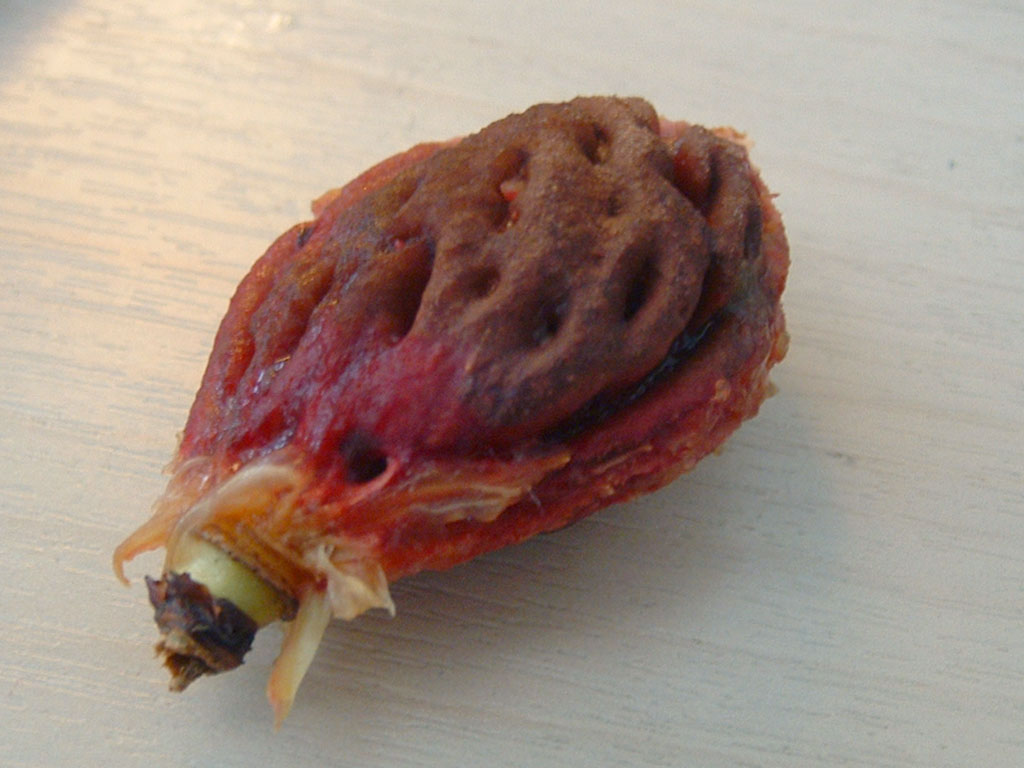
The pit of a nectarine

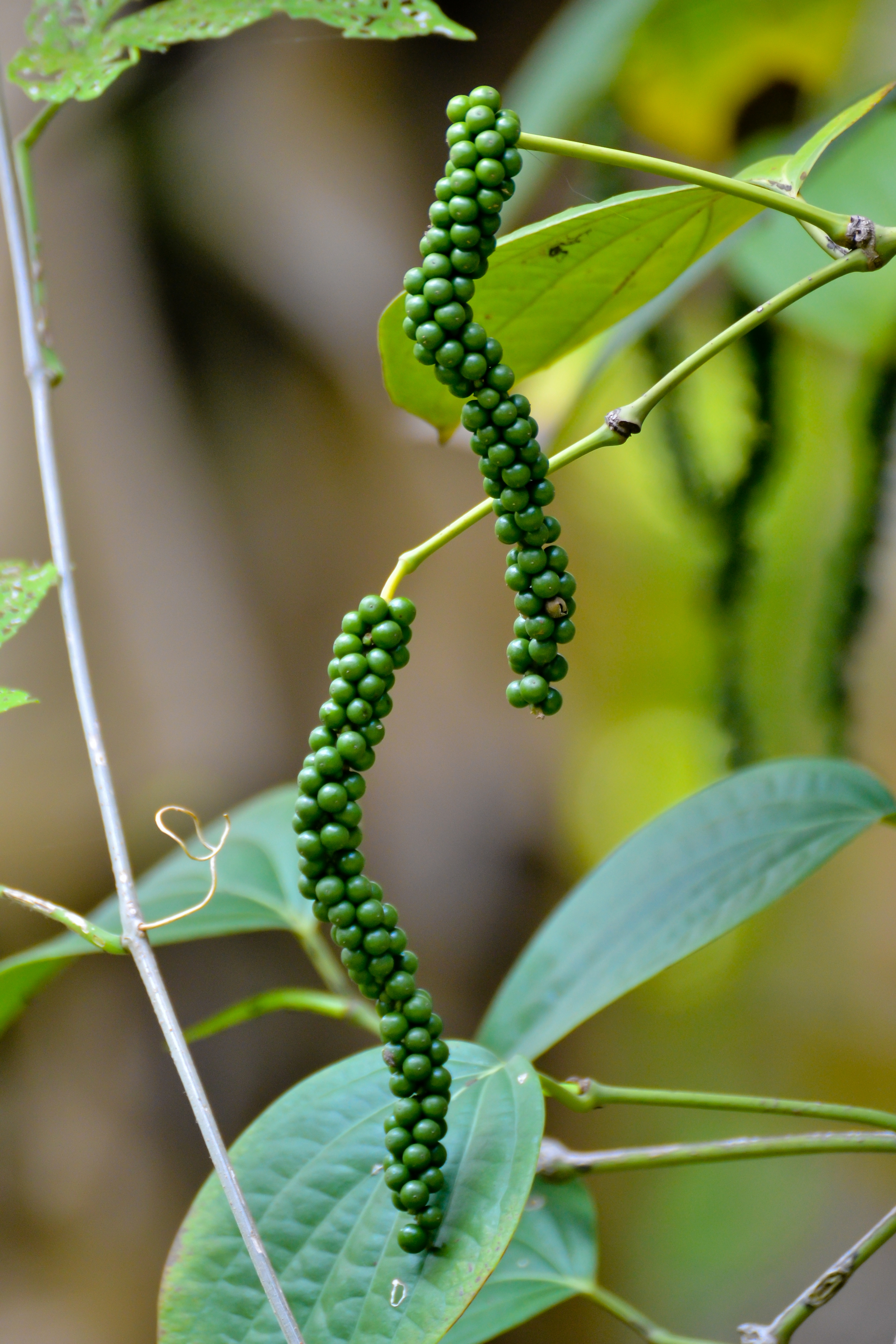
Unripe drupes of black pepper

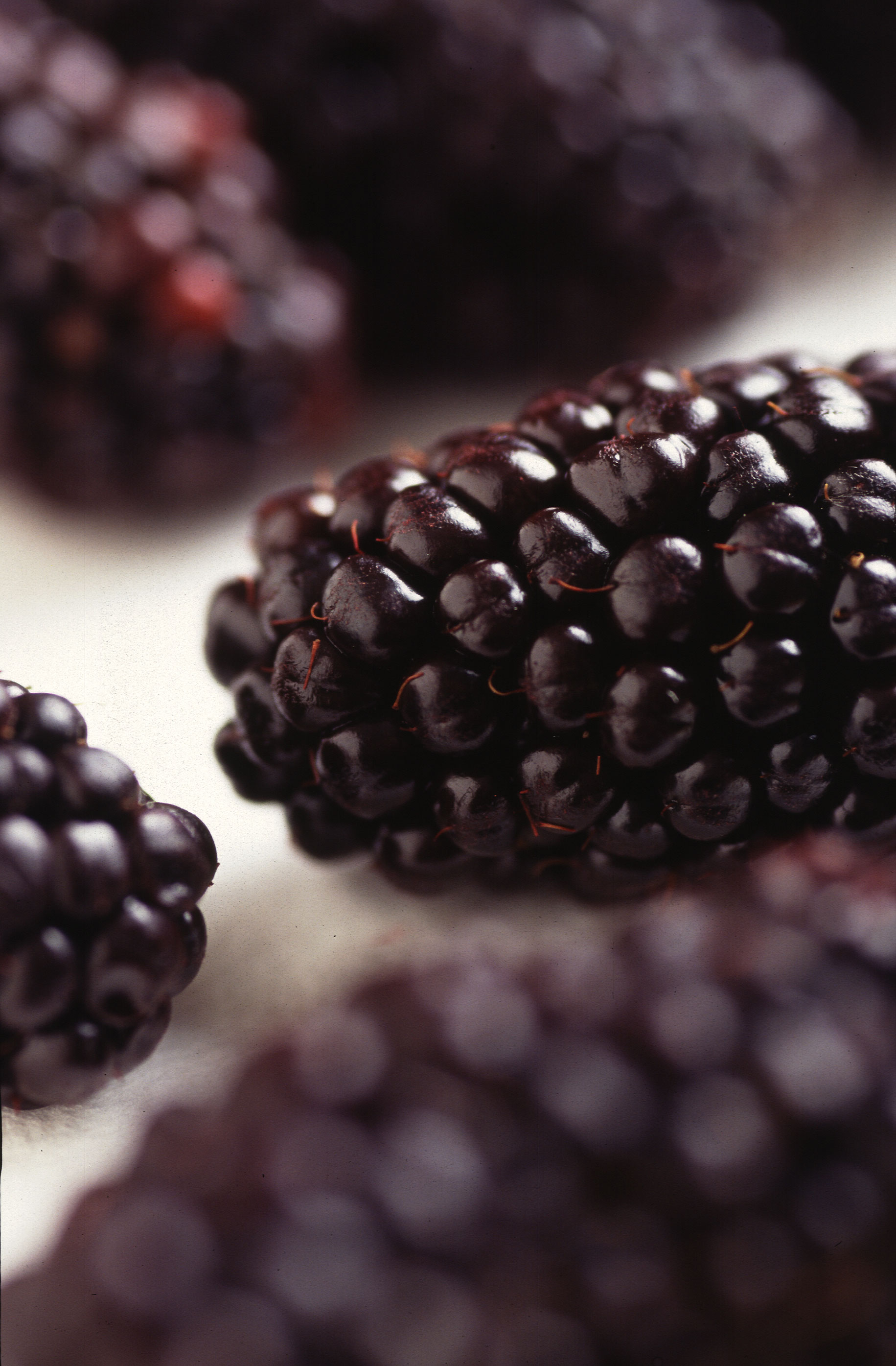
'Black Butte' blackberry, a bramble fruit of aggregated drupelets

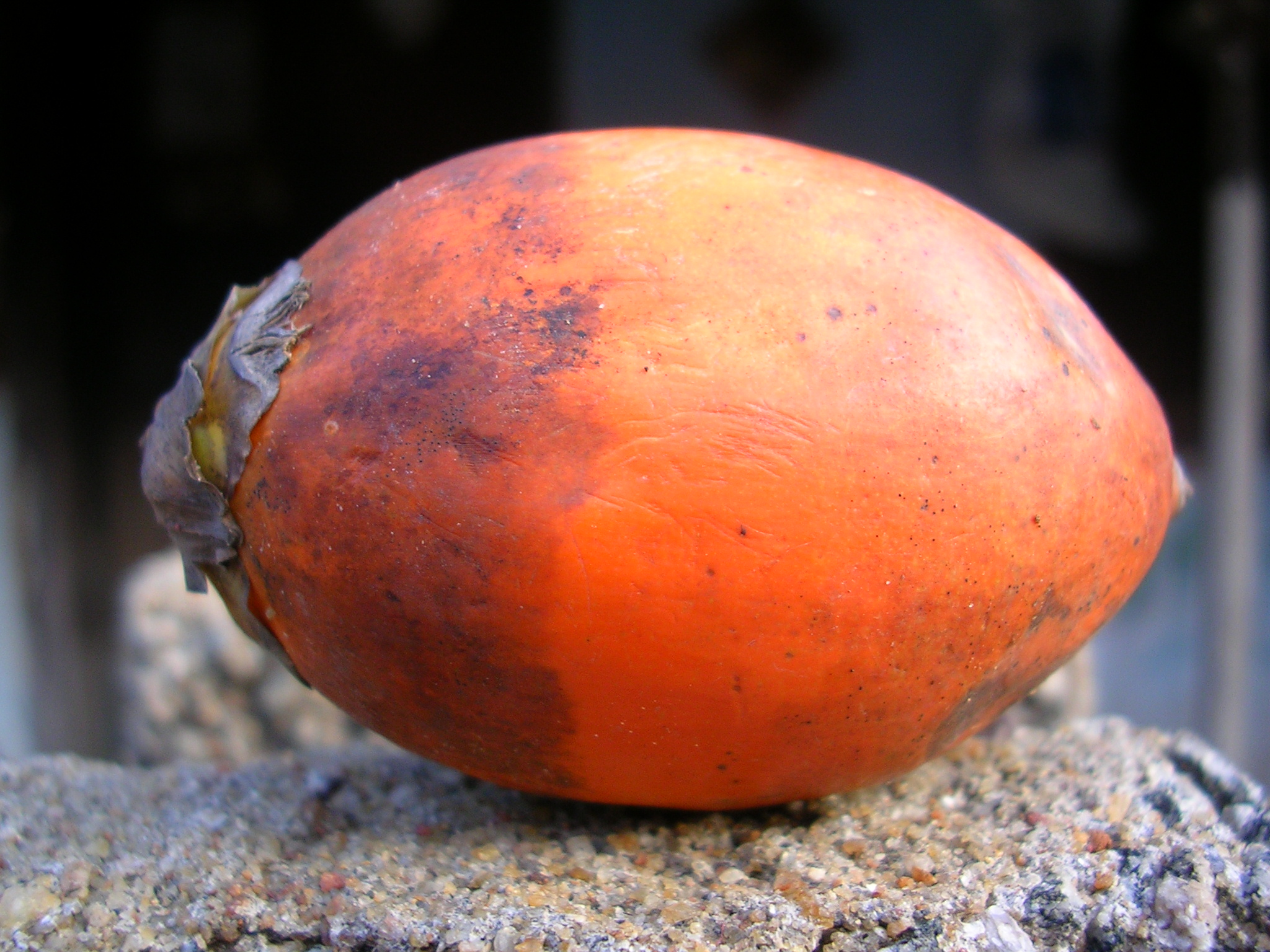
A ripe areca nut

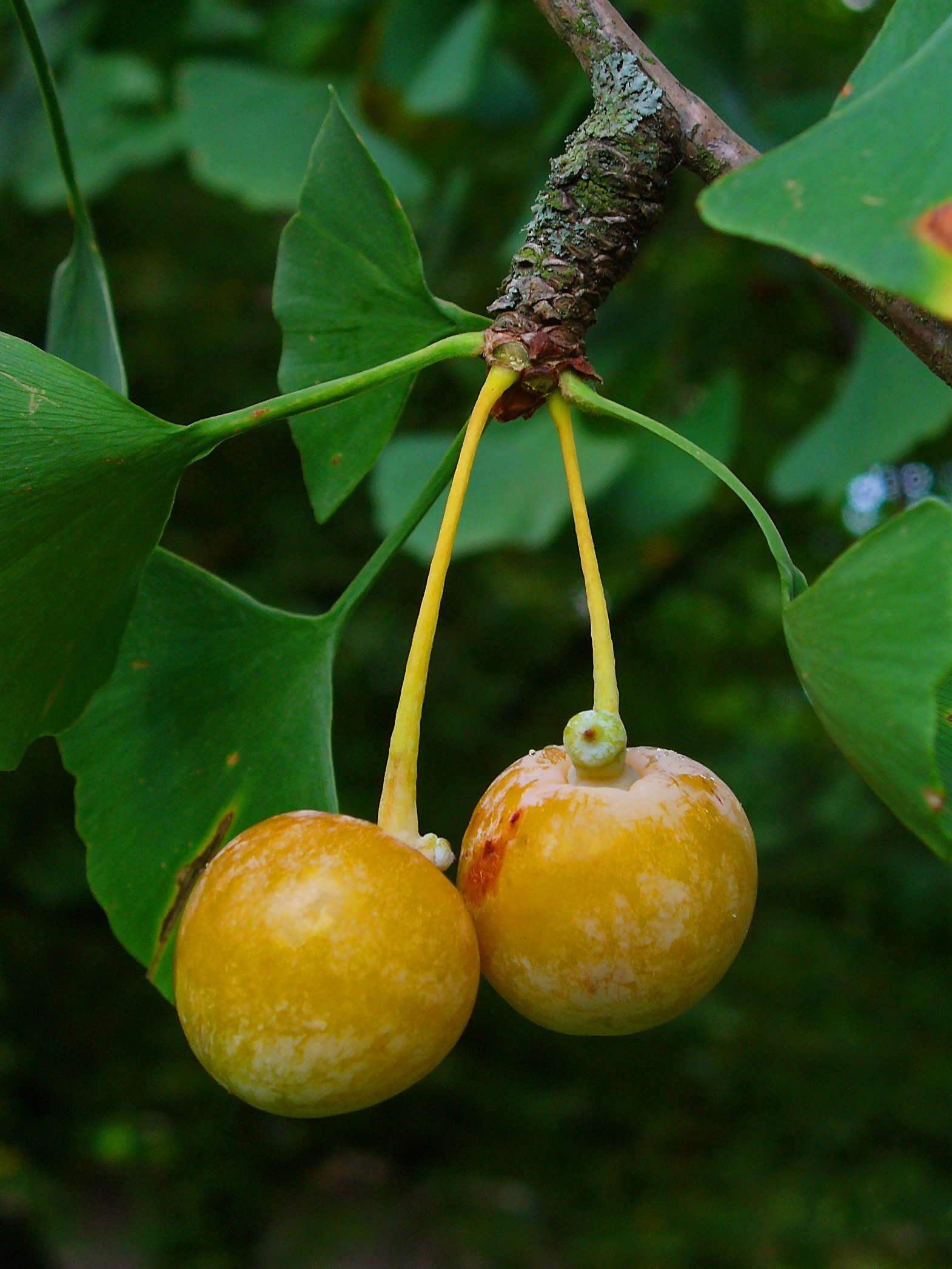
Ginkgo "fruits", often noted as drupe-like

== See also ==
- Pome (polypyrenous drupe)
