= Achene =

Class of simple non-opening dry fruits

Rosa hypanthium encircling separate achene fruits

An achene (/əˈkiːn/; from Ancient Greek ἀ (a) 'privative' and χαίνειν (khaínein) 'to gape'), also sometimes called akene and occasionally achenium or achenocarp, is a type of simple dry fruit produced by many species of flowering plants. Achenes are monocarpellate (formed from one carpel) and indehiscent (they do not open at maturity). Achenes contain a single seed that nearly fills the pericarp, but does not adhere to it. In many species, what is called the "seed" is an achene, a fruit containing the seed. The seed-like appearance is owed to the hardening of the fruit wall (pericarp), which encloses the solitary seed so closely as to seem like a seed coat.

== Examples ==
The fruits of buttercup, buckwheat, caraway, quinoa, amaranth, and cannabis are typical achenes.

The achenes of the strawberry are sometimes mistaken for seeds. The strawberry is an accessory fruit with an aggregate of achenes on its outer surface, and what is eaten is accessory tissue.

A rose produces an aggregate of achene fruits that are encompassed within an expanded hypanthium, which is a structure where basal portions of the calyx, the corolla, and the stamens unite with the receptacle to form a cup-shaped tube.

== Variations ==
A winged achene, as in maple, is called a samara.

Some achenes have accessory hair-like structures that cause them to tumble in the wind in a manner similar to a tumbleweed. This type sometimes is called a tumble fruit or diaspore. An example is Anemone virginiana.

A caryopsis or grain is a type of fruit that closely resembles an achene, but differs in that the pericarp is fused to the thin seed coat in the grain.

An utricle is like an achene, but the fruit is bladder-like or inflated.

Fruits of sedges are sometimes considered achenes although their one-locule ovary is a compound ovary.

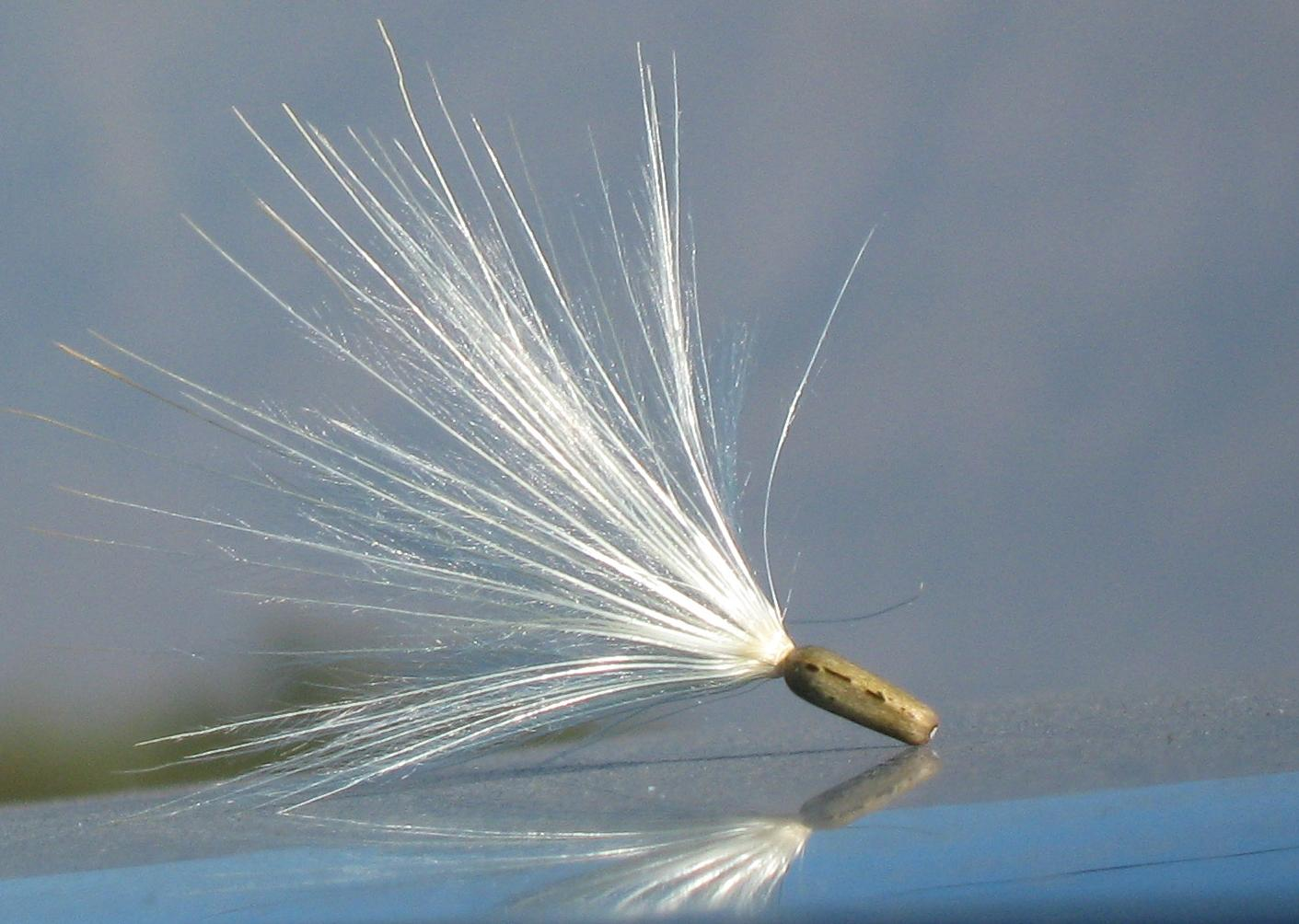
Cypsela of Cynara

The fruit of the family Asteraceae is also so similar to an achene that it is often considered to be one, although it derives from a compound inferior ovary (with one locule). A special term for the Asteraceae fruit is cypsela (plural cypselae or cypselas). For example, the white-gray husks of a sunflower "seed" are the walls of the cypsela fruit. Many cypselas (e.g. dandelion) have modified calyx tissue called pappi attached that functions in biological dispersal of the seed.

== Gallery ==
Cypselae on a dandelion "clock" (the matured capitulum) can disperse in the wind due to the hair-like calyx tissue above each ovary.

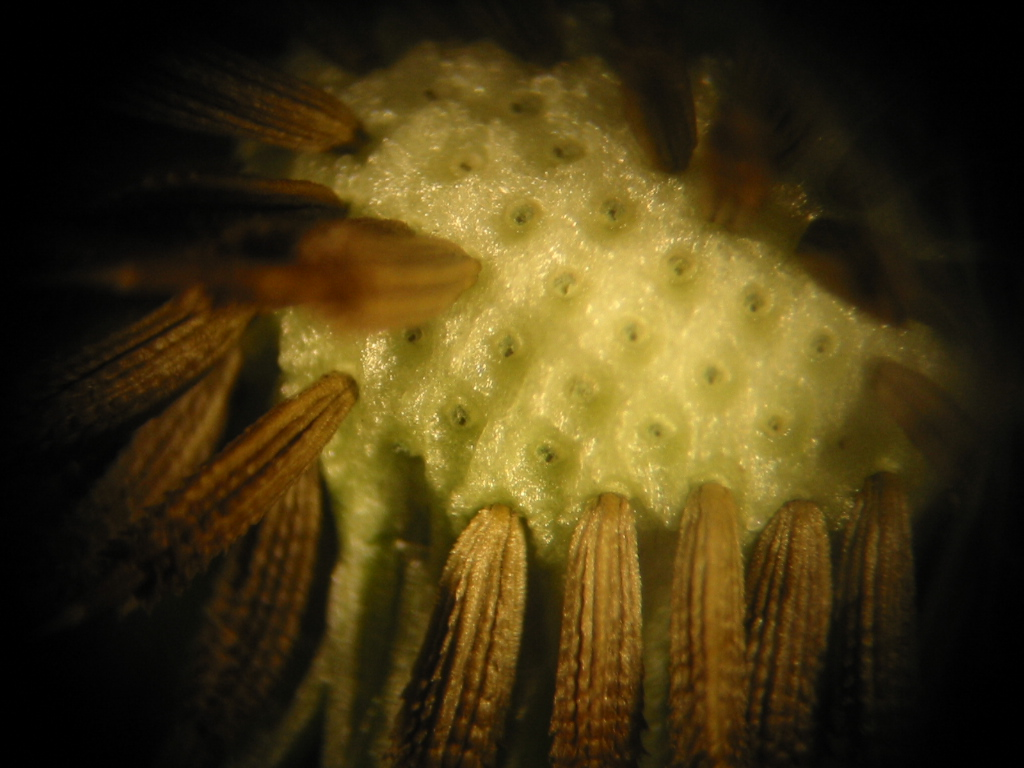
A microscopic view of a dandelion "clock" showing the receptacle and the cypselas.

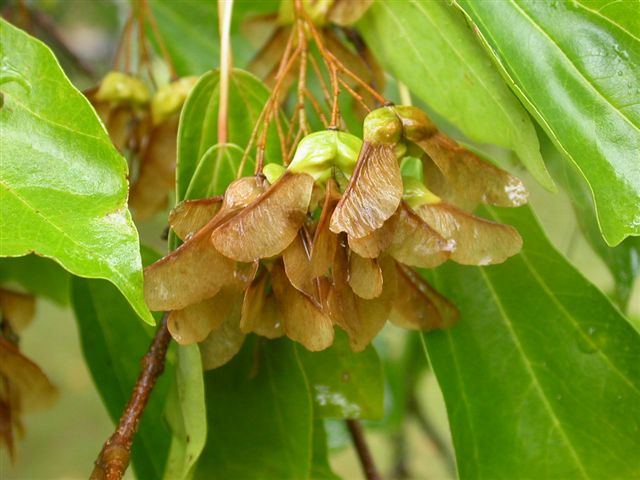
Samaras of Acer buergerianum are achenes with large wing-like structures.

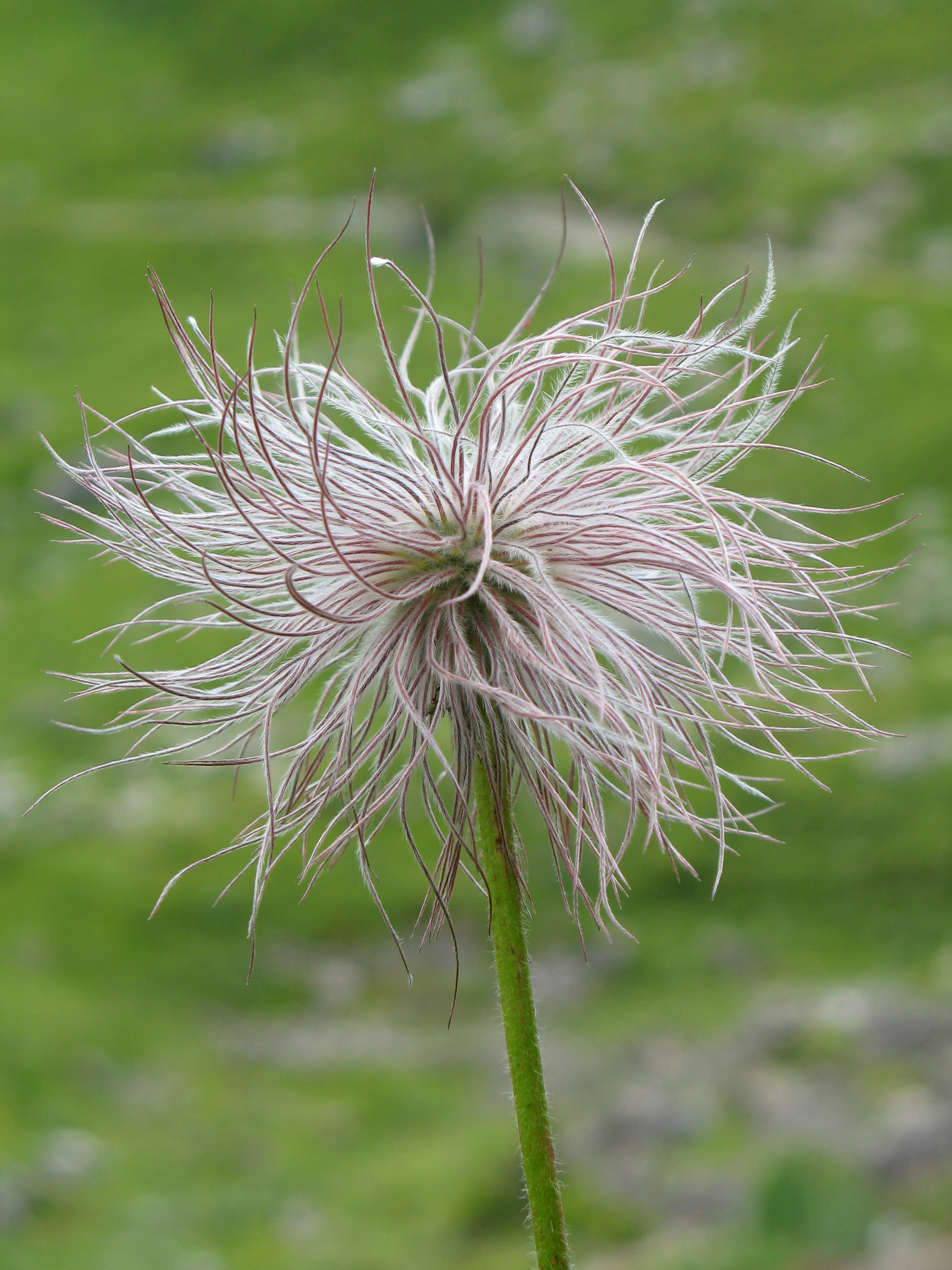
The diaspore of Pulsatilla (family Ranunculaceae) disperses in the wind, either as single achenes or as the entire aggregate of achenes. The achenes have long hairy appendages that developed from the style of the flower.

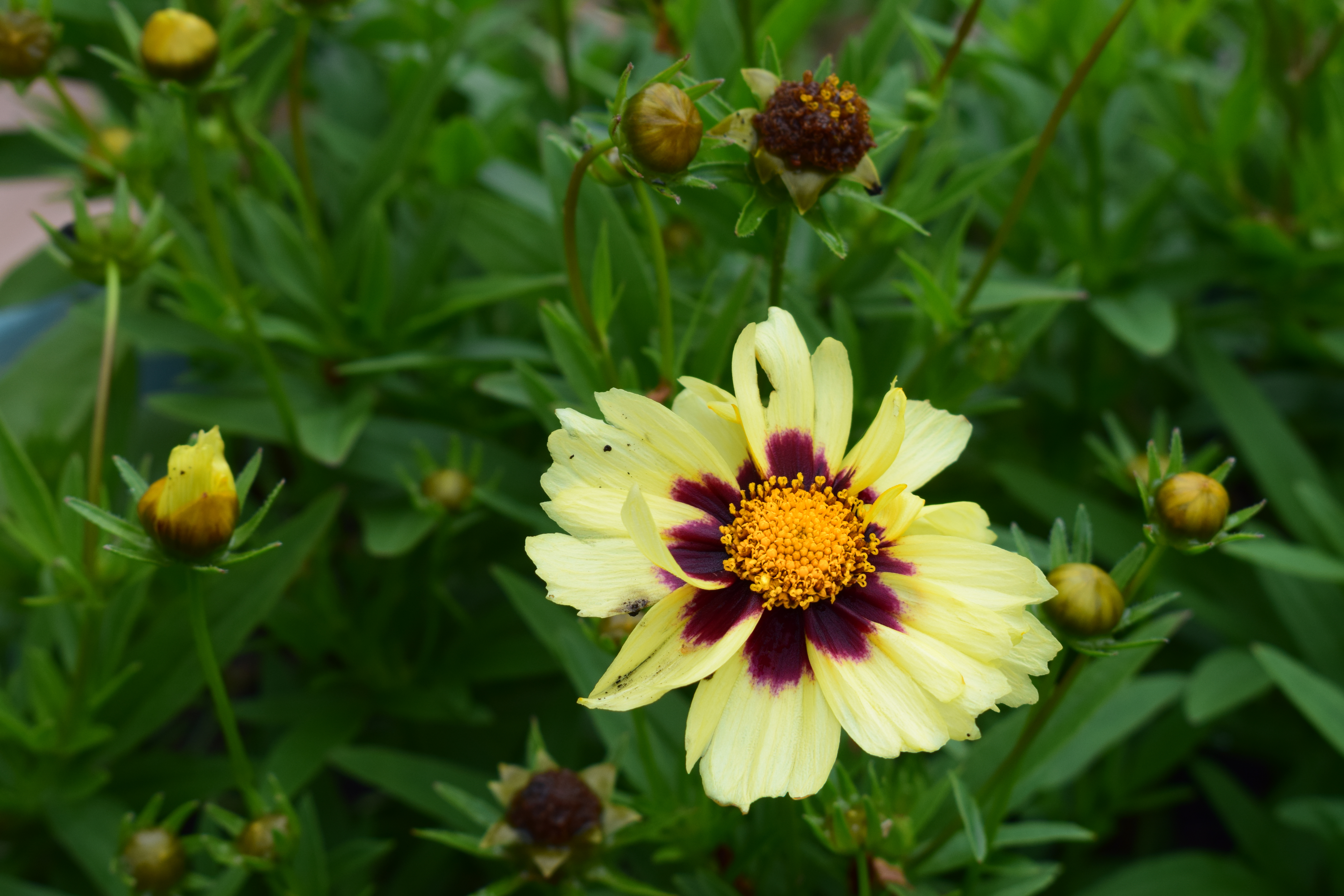
Coreopsis tinctoria showing 4 stages of inflorescence, with two reddish-brown flower heads containing cypselas

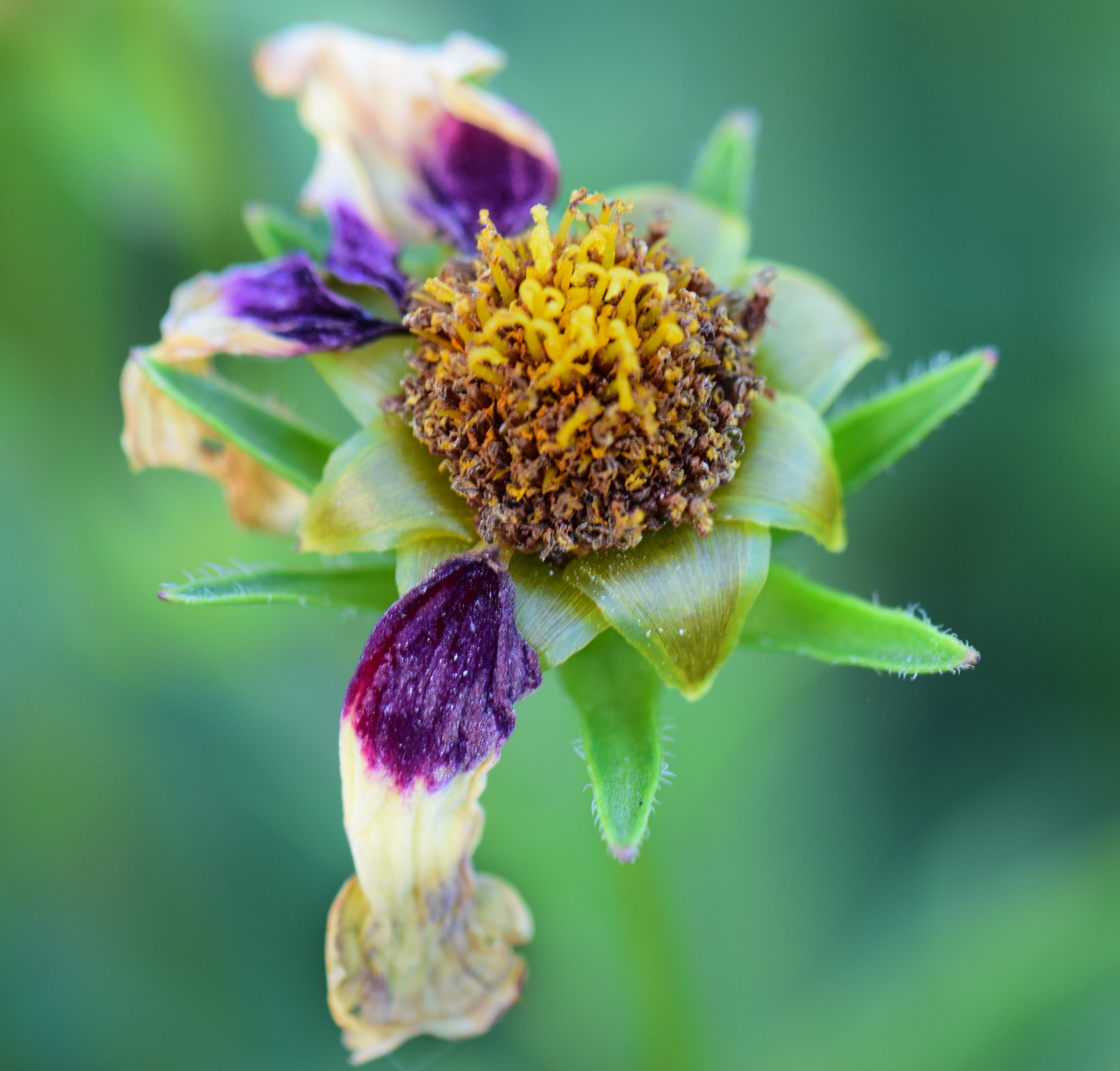
Coreopsis tinctoria flower head containing cypselas forming as florets finish blooming
