= Pandanus concretus =

Conservation status
- Least Concern (IUCN 3.1)

Scientific classification
- Kingdom: Plantae
- Clade: Tracheophytes
- Clade: Angiosperms
- Clade: Monocots
- Order: Pandanales
- Family: Pandanaceae
- Genus: Pandanus
- Species: P. concretus

Binomial name
- Pandanus concretus Baker

Species of tree

Pandanus concretus is a dioecious tree in the screwpine genus. It is endemic to Madagascar, found in Toliara province. Pandanus concretus is the accepted name, but it has also been called Pandanus centrifugalis, P. dauphinensis, P. erectus and P. madagascarensis.

== Description ==
Pandanus concretus (as described by St. John under the proposed name P. centrifugalis) is a tree up to 10 m tall with brown bark and a trunk up to 20 cm in diameter. The trunk is armed with sharp, conic spines. The crown of the tree is wide. Below the crown are branchlets 8.5 cm in diameter. Leaves are 9-11 cm wide, 1.58- 1.65 m long and without cross-veins, except near the base. Edges and midribs of the leaves are armed with spines to 6–8 mm long. P. concretus usually has no prop roots, but when present, they are light brown with short spines and up to 1 m long and 2.5 cm in diameter.

=== Flowers and fruit ===
The flower clusters are erect spikes borne at the ends of branches. Each spike has nine fruits (syncarps) attached in three rows. Fruits are 12- 15.5 cm long and nearly cylindrical. The fruits have a pleasant scent, but may be irritating when eaten.

== Distribution and habitat ==
The trees are found on the coastal plains of lIe Sainte Marie, off the east coast of Madagascar, associated with sand flats, lateritic soils or basalt gravels. Although the area is heavily agricultural, P. concretus is a vigorous tree and a main component of secondary forests.

== Uses ==
Dried leaves are plaited to make floor mats, baskets etc.

== Conservation status ==
Although populations are declining, there are 25 known sub-populations and the species occurs in six protected areas, so it has been assessed as "Least Concern". Threats include clearing of native habitats for agriculture or mining as well as direct harvest for wood.

== Taxonomy ==
Pandanus concretus is a member of the section Daupbinensia. P. dauphinensis Martelli is its closest relative.
