= Compound fruit =

Type of fruit

The term compound fruit is not used in technical botanical writing, but is sometimes used when it is not clear which of several fruit types is involved. A compound fruit is "composed of two or more similar parts".

A compound fruit may be:

- An aggregate fruit, in which one flower contains several separate ovaries, which merge during development.
- A multiple fruit, in which several flowers, each with an ovary, develop into small fruits that are clustered or fused together into a larger fruit.
- A simple fruit formed from a compound ovary.
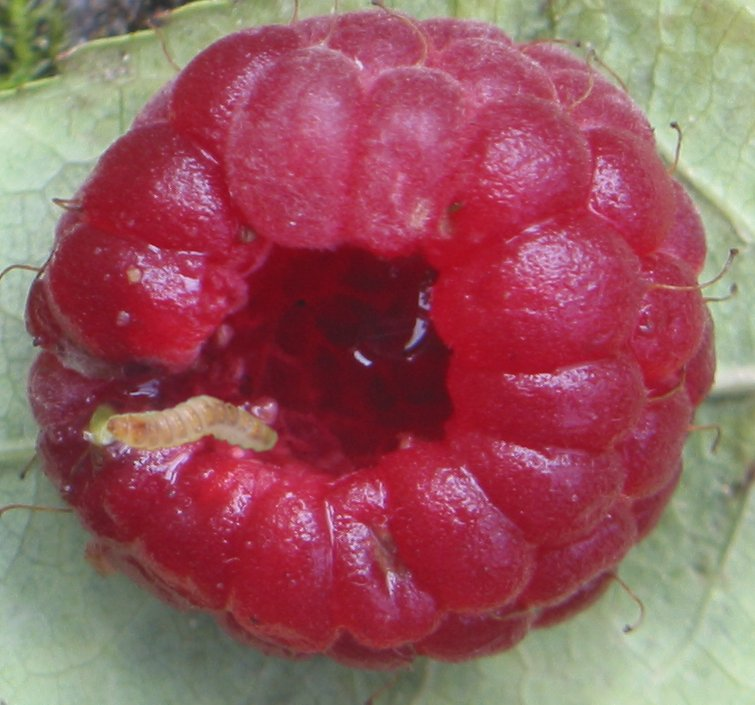
A raspberry is an aggregate fruit (shown with a raspberry beetle larva)

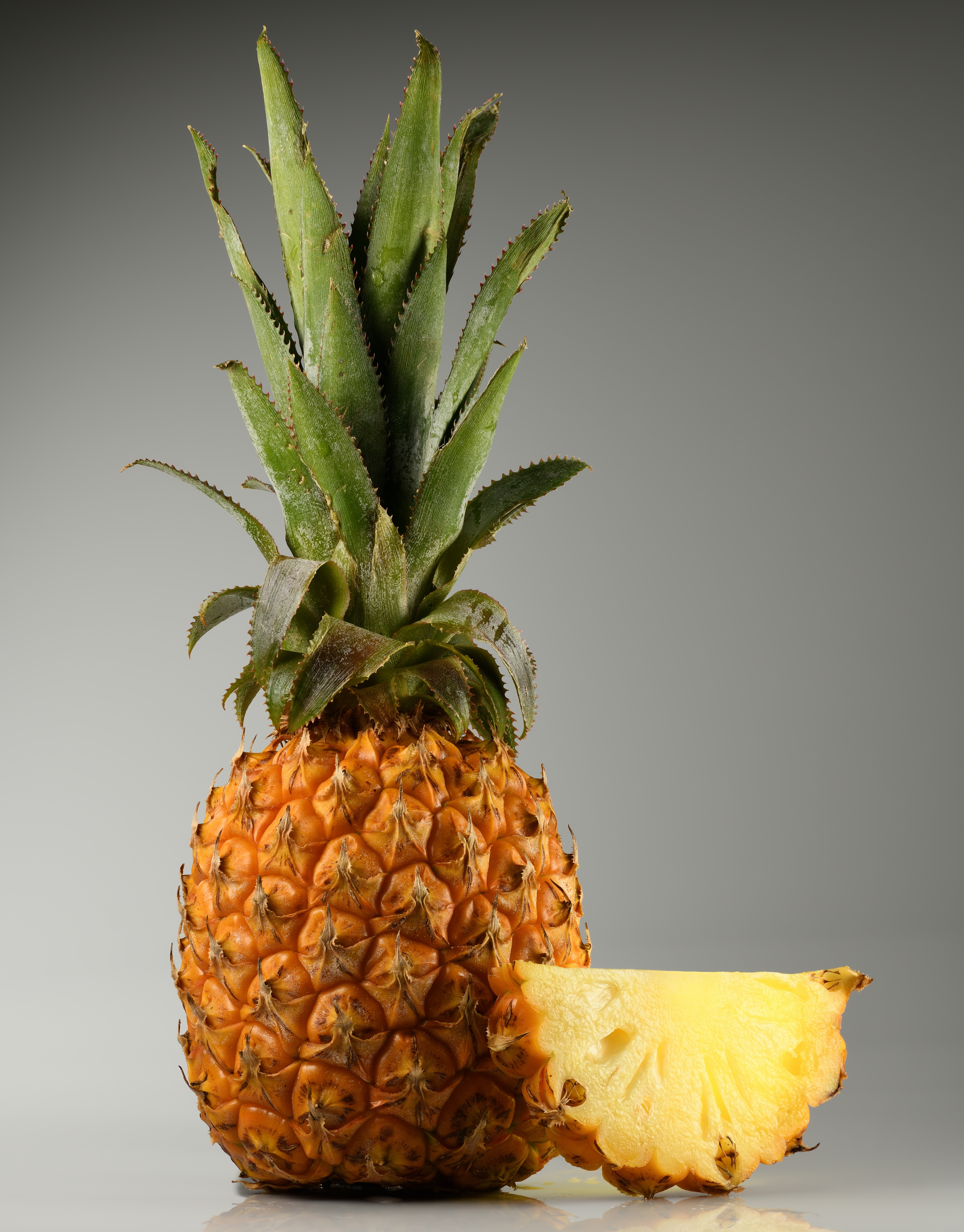
A pineapple is a multiple fruit

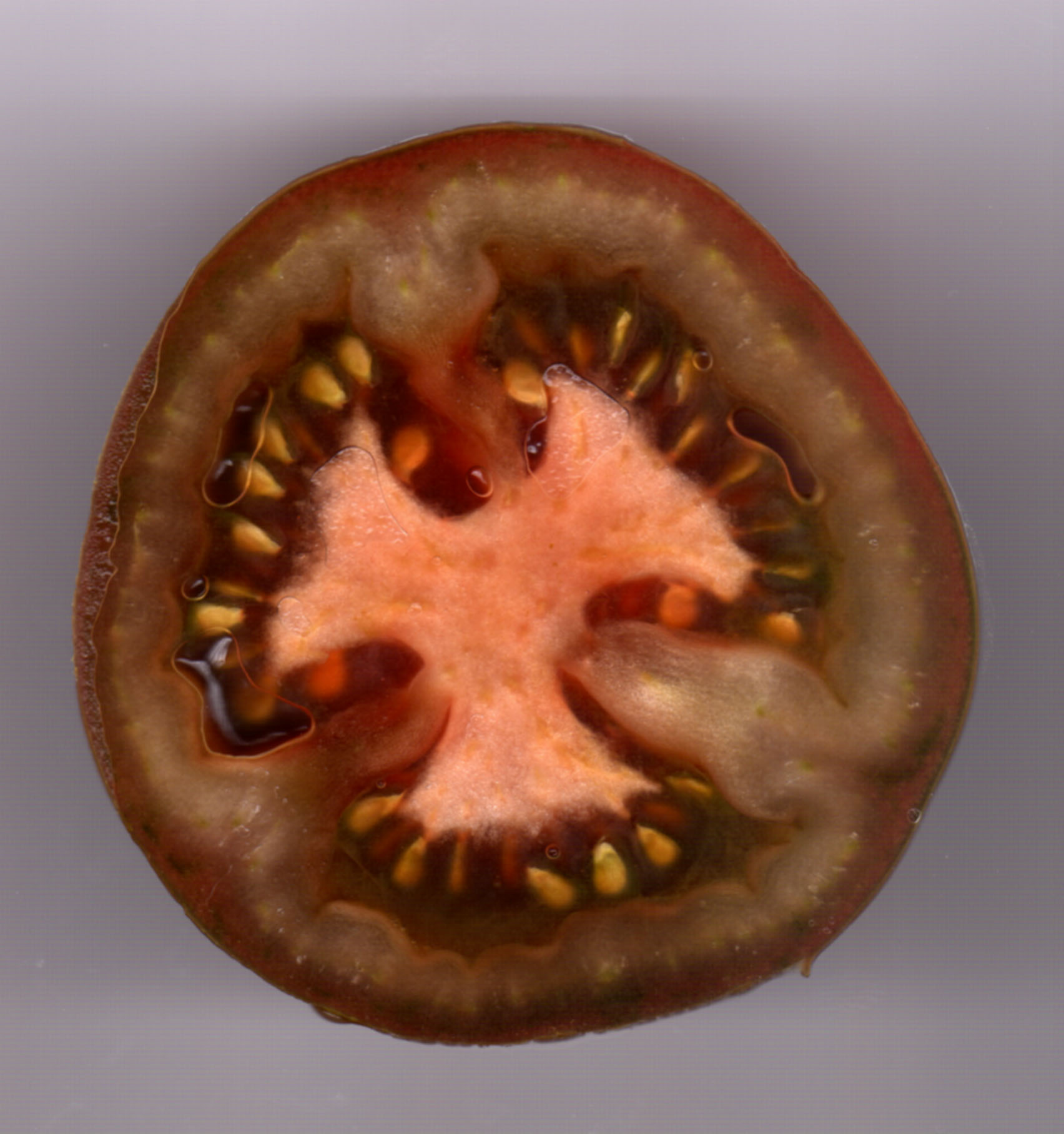
A tomato is a simple fruit derived from a compound ovary

Grapes grow in clusters, but are not compound fruits. Each grape is grown from one ovary in one flower, and each grape remains an independent fruit.
