= Multiple fruit =

Fruiting bodies formed from a cluster of fruiting flowers (inflorescence)

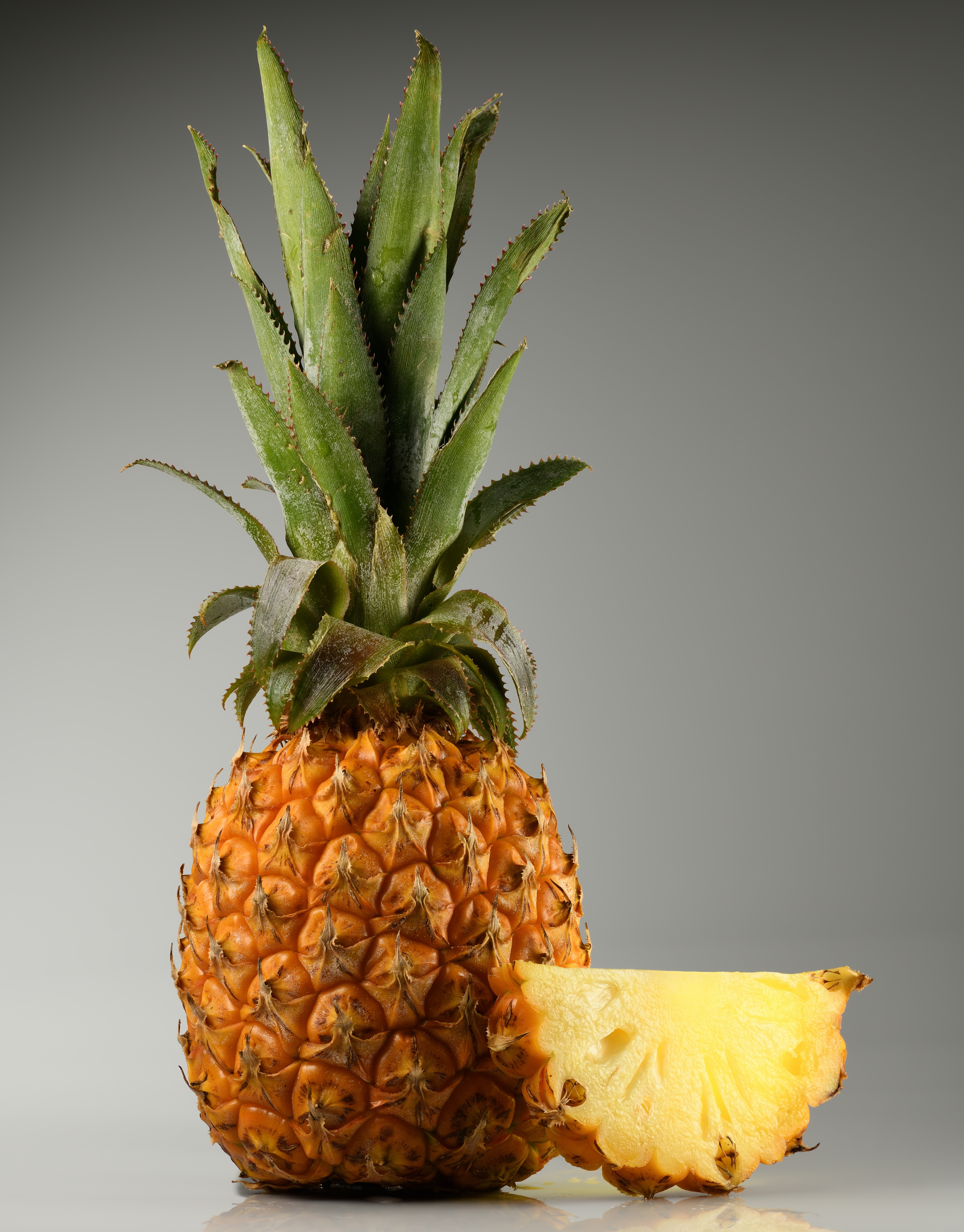
Pineapple is a kind of multiple fruit

Multiple fruits, also called collective fruits or multifruits are fruiting bodies formed from a cluster of flowers, the inflorescence. Each flower in the inflorescence produces a fruit, but these mature into a single mass. After flowering, the mass is called an infructescence. Examples are the fig, pineapple, mulberry, osage orange, and jackfruit.

In contrast, an aggregate fruit such as a raspberry develops from multiple ovaries of a single flower. In languages other than English, the meanings of "multiple" and "aggregate" fruit are reversed, so that multiple fruits merge several pistils within a single flower.

In some cases, the infructescences are similar in appearance to simple fruits. One example is pineapple (Ananas), which is formed from the fusion of the berries with receptacle tissues and bracts.

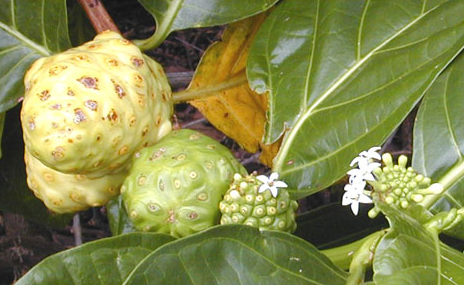
In some plants, such as this noni, flowers are produced continuously and it is possible to see examples of flowering, fruit development and fruit ripening together on a single stem.

As shown in the photograph of the noni, stages of flowering and fruit development in the noni or Indian mulberry (Morinda citrifolia) can be observed on a single branch. First an inflorescence of white flowers called a head is produced. After fertilization, each flower develops into a drupe, and as the drupes expand, they become connate (merge) into a multiple fleshy fruit called a syncarp. There are also many dry multiple fruits.

Other examples of multiple fruits:

- Plane tree, multiple achenes from multiple flowers, in a single fruit structure
- Mulberry, multiple flowers form one fruit
- Breadfruit, multiple flowers form one fruit
- Fig, multiple flowers similar to mulberry infructescence form a multiple fruit inside the inverted inflorescence. This form is called a syconium.

== Gallery ==
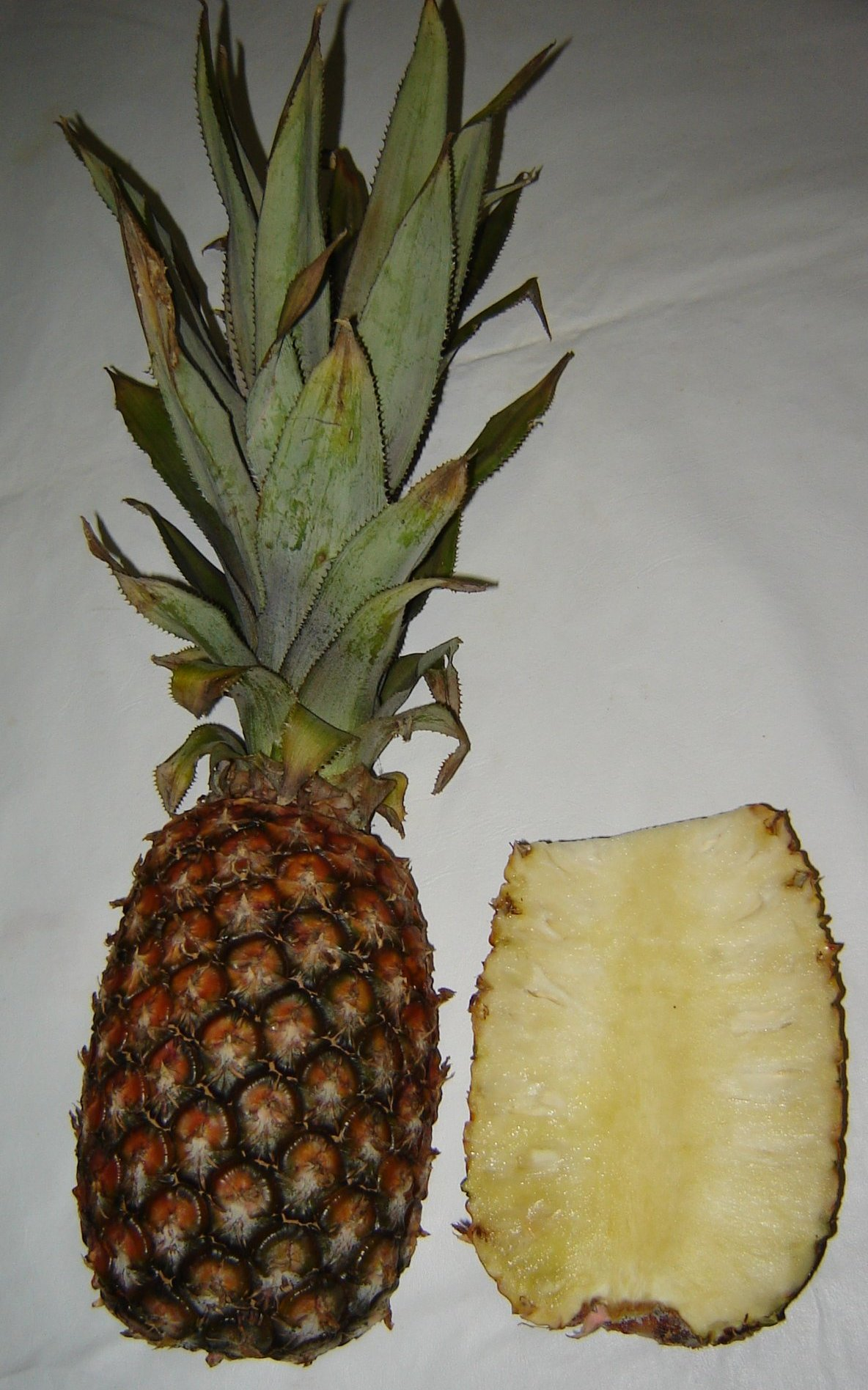
Ananas comosus (pineapple)

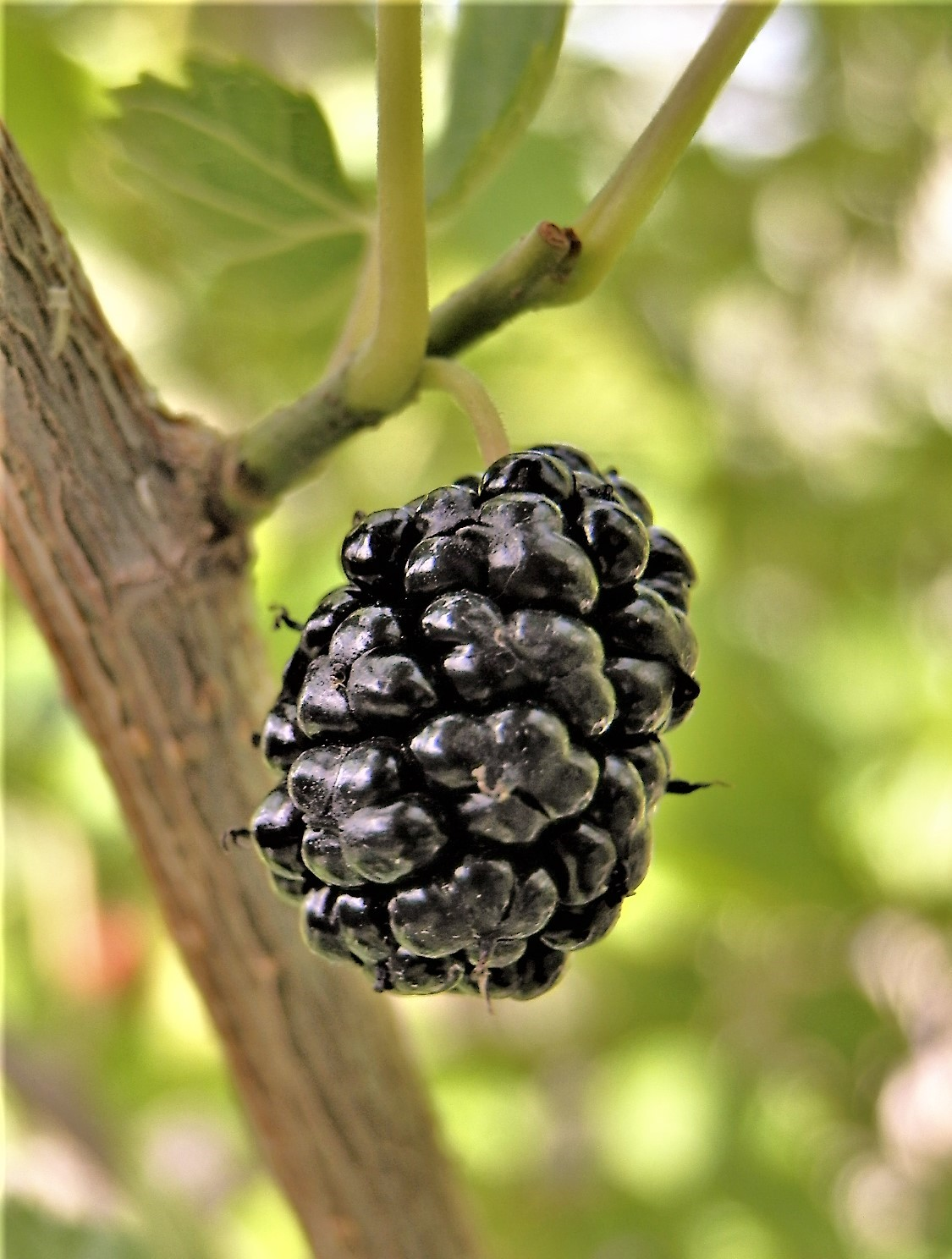
Morus nigra (black mulberry)

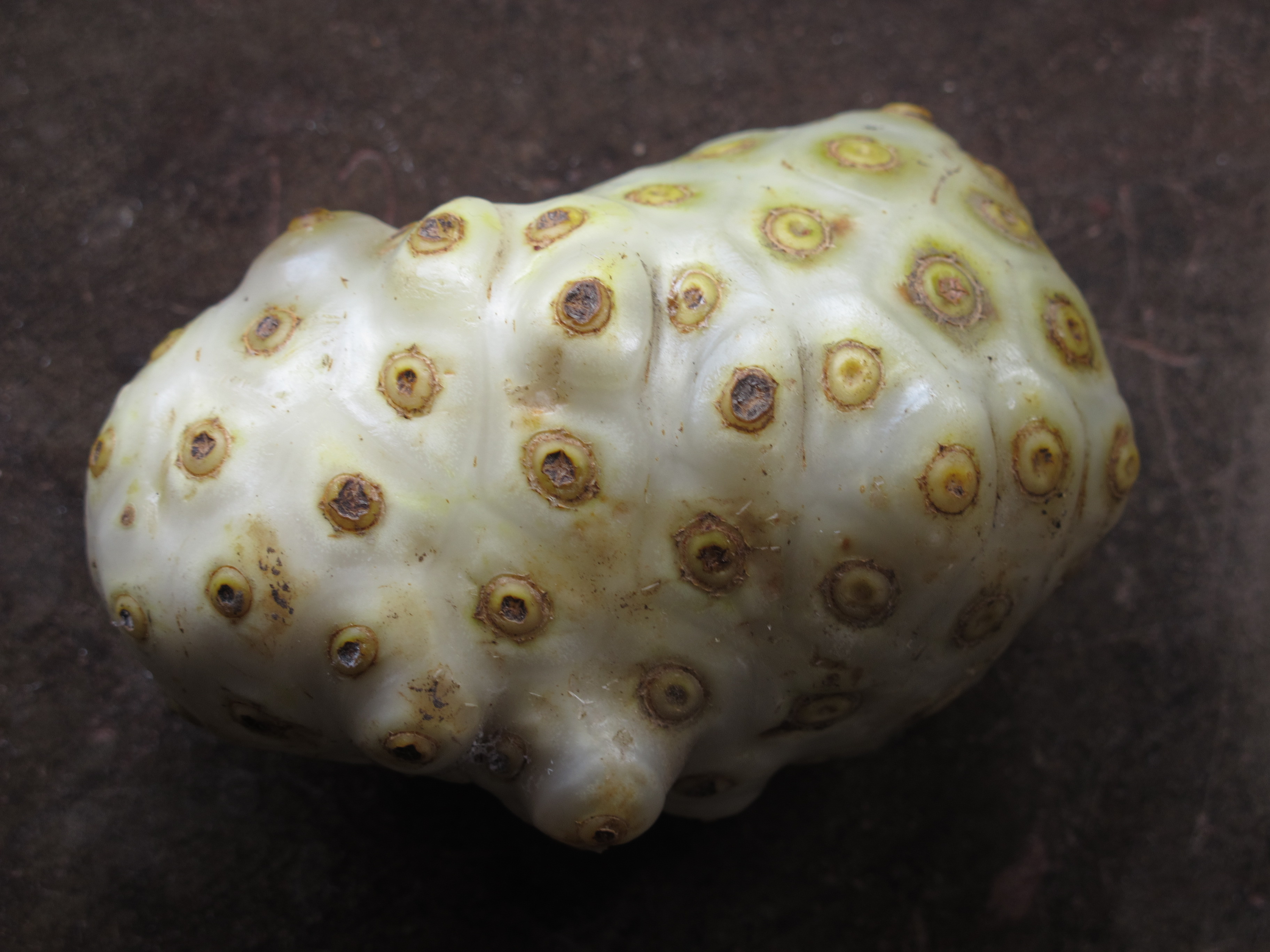
Morinda citrifolia (noni)

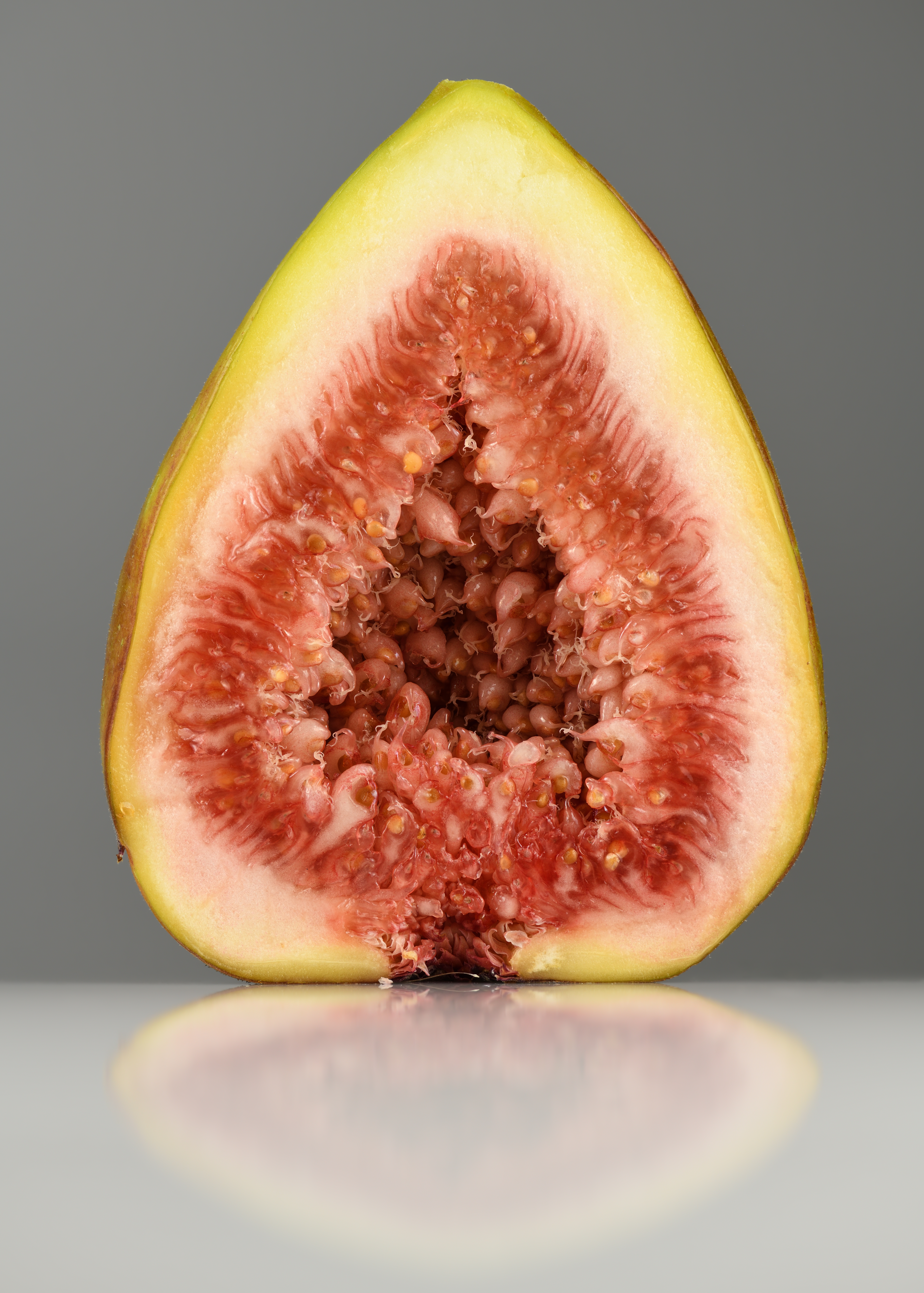
Ficus carica (fig)

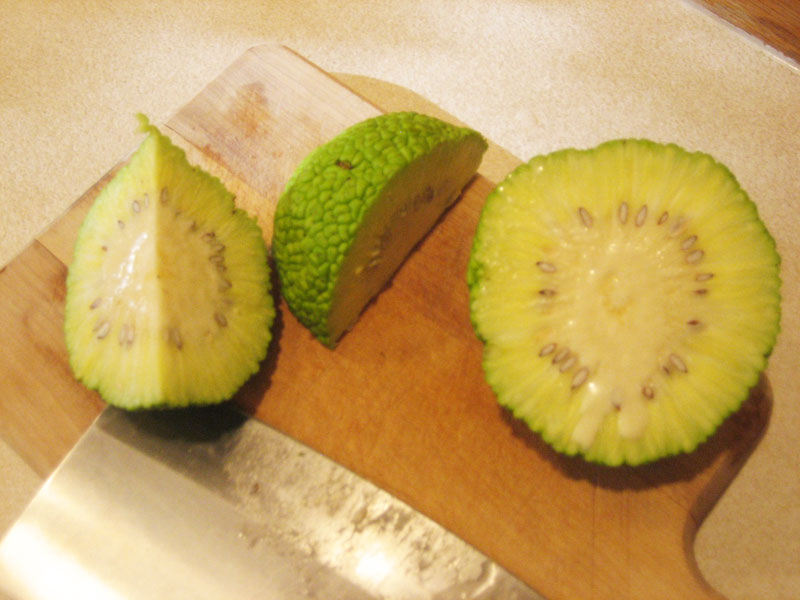
Maclura pomifera (Osage orange)

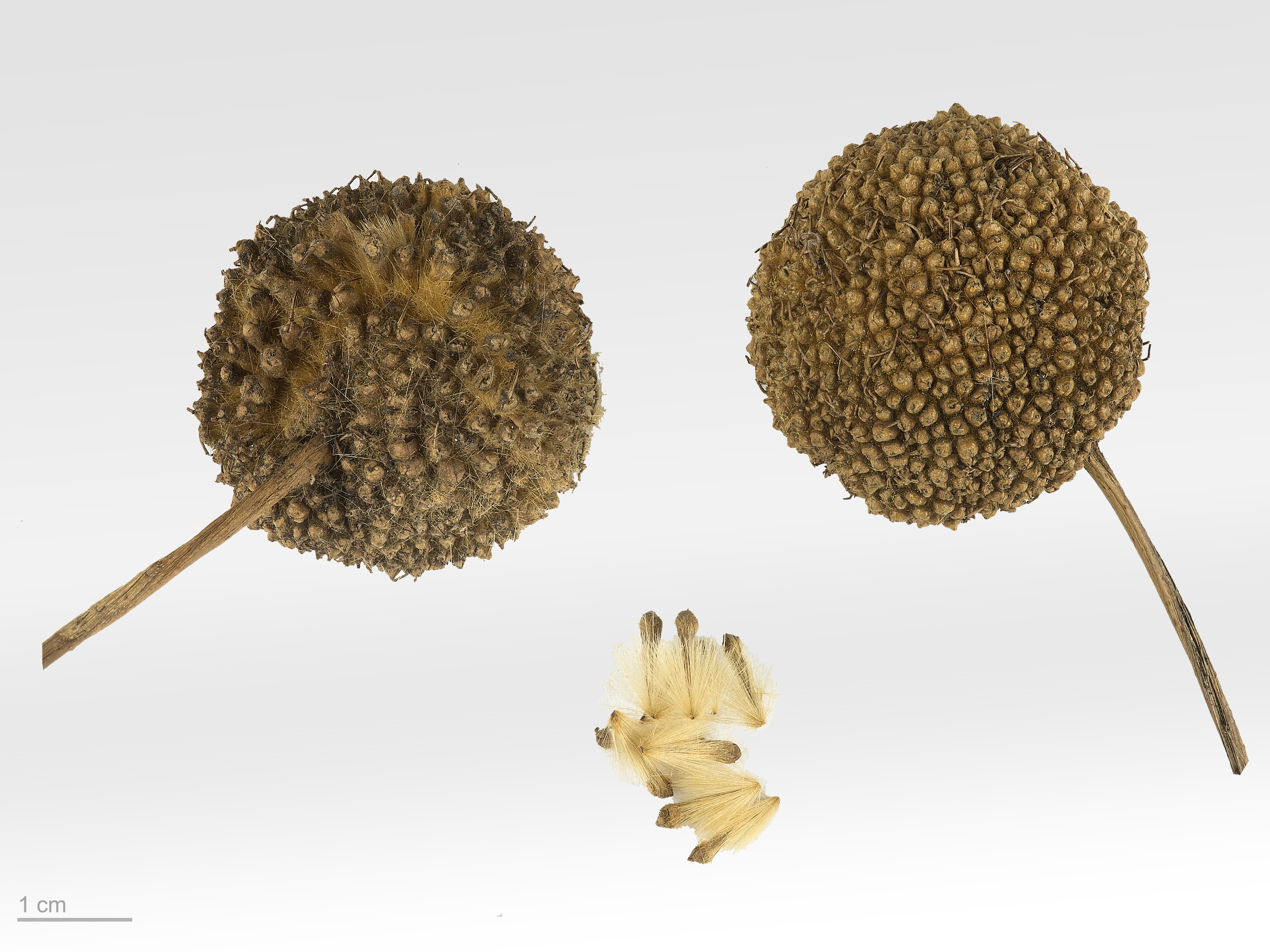
Platanus x hispanica. (London plane tree)

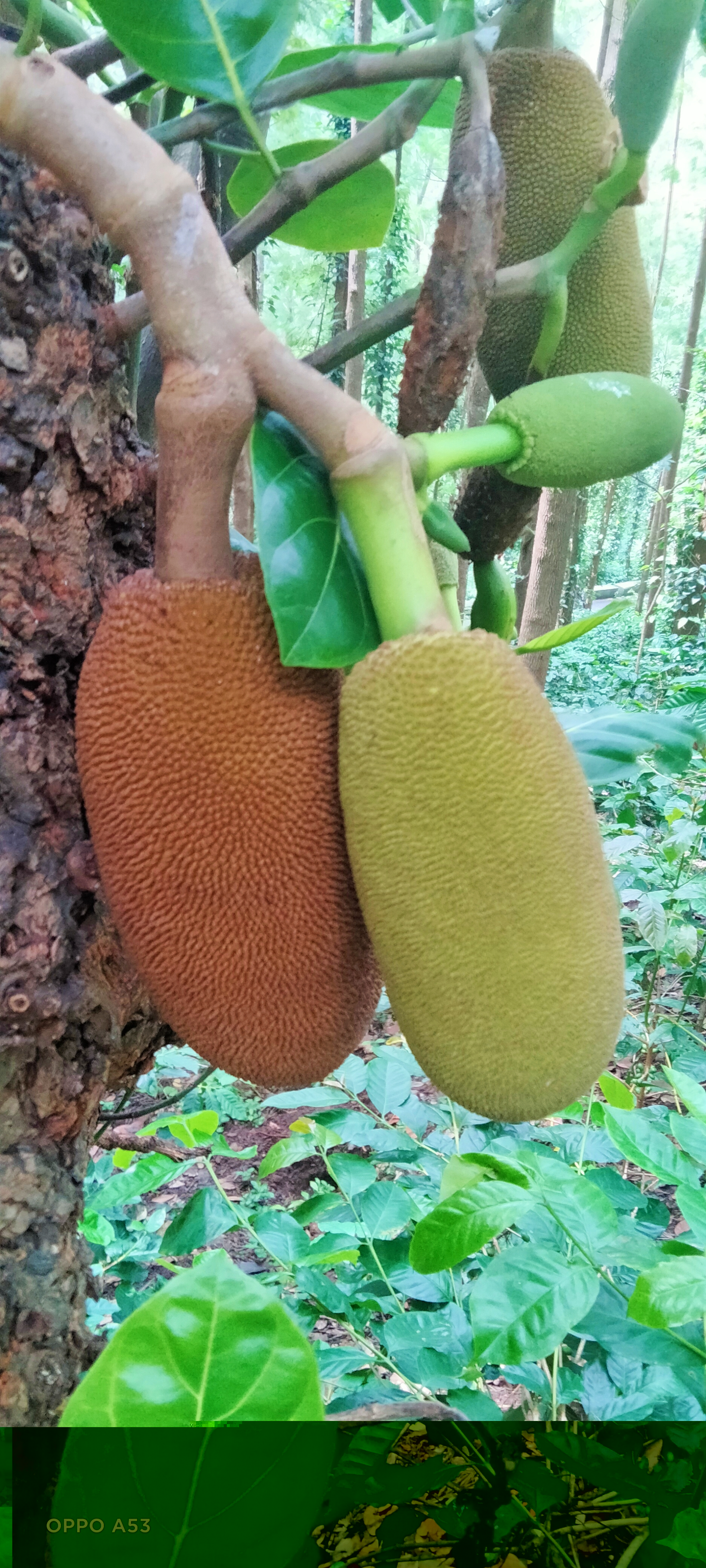
Artocarpus heterophyllus (jackfruit)

== See also ==
- Compound fruit
