= Fruit =

Seed-bearing part of a flowering plant

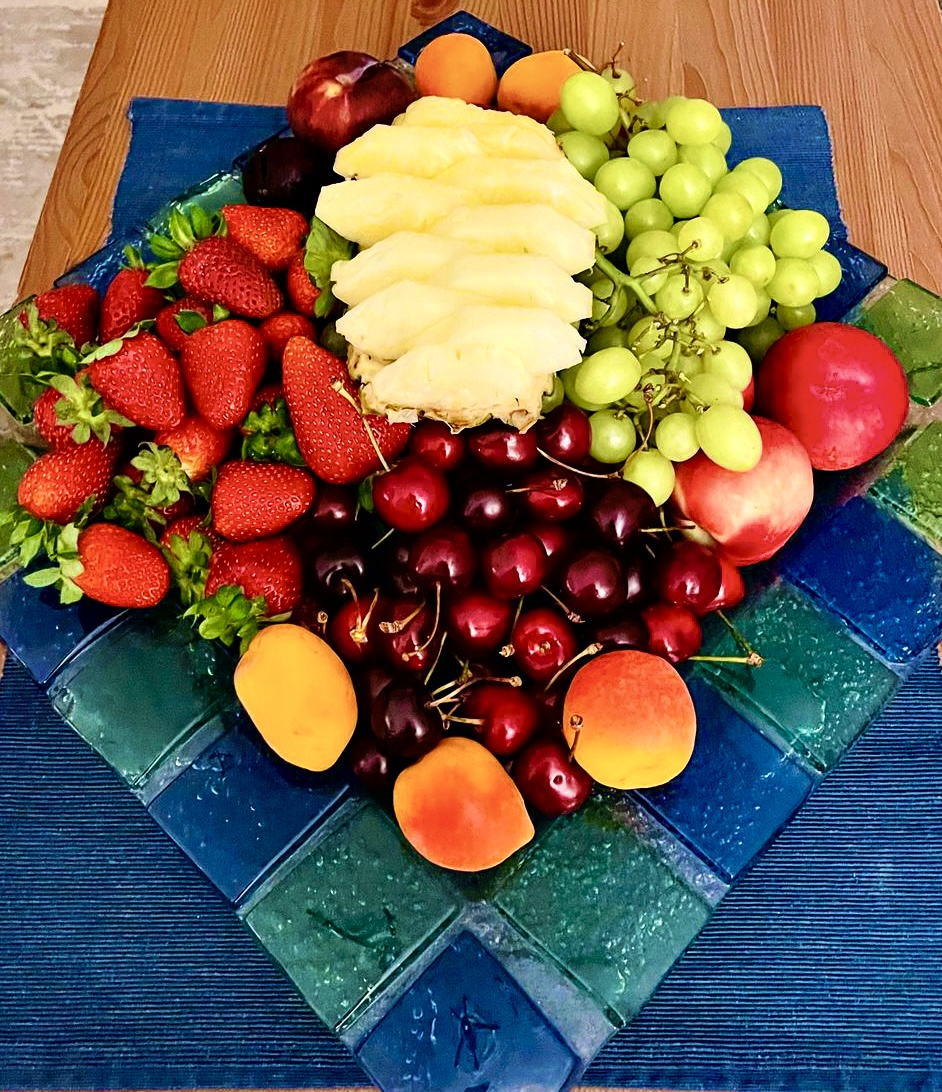
Fruit platter – seasonal fruits

In botany, a fruit is the seed-bearing structure in flowering plants (angiosperms) that is formed from the ovary after flowering.

Fruits are the means by which angiosperms disseminate their seeds. Edible fruits in particular have long propagated using the movements of humans and other animals in a symbiotic relationship that is the means for seed dispersal for the one group and nutrition for the other; humans, and many other animals, have become dependent on fruits as a source of food. Consequently, fruits account for a substantial fraction of the world's agricultural output, and some (such as the apple and the pomegranate) have acquired extensive cultural and symbolic meanings.

In common language and culinary usage, fruit normally means the seed-associated fleshy structures (or produce) of plants that are typically sweet (or sour) and edible in the raw state, such as apples, bananas, grapes, lemons, oranges, and strawberries. In botanical usage, the term fruit includes many structures that are not commonly called as such in everyday language, such as nuts, bean pods, corn kernels, tomatoes, and wheat grains.

== Botanical vs. culinary ==
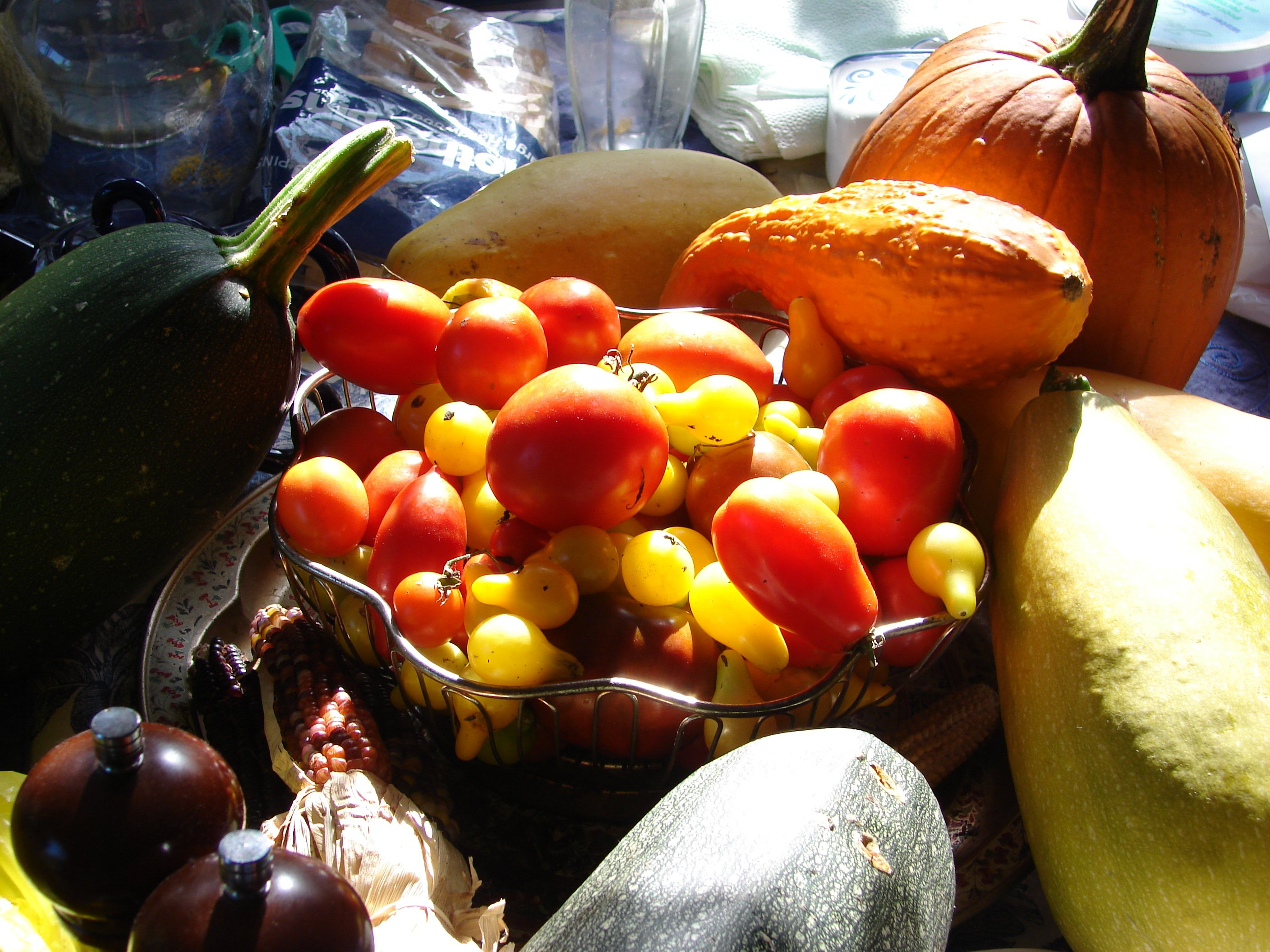
An arrangement of fruits commonly thought of as culinary vegetables, including maize, tomatoes, and squashes

Many common language terms used for fruit and seeds differ from botanical classifications. For example, in botany, a fruit is a ripened ovary or carpel that contains seeds, e.g., an orange, pomegranate, tomato or a pumpkin. A nut is a type of fruit (and not a seed), and a seed is a ripened ovule.

In culinary language, a fruit is the sweet- or not sweet- (even sour-) tasting produce of a specific plant (e.g., a peach, pear or lemon); nuts are hard, oily, non-sweet plant produce in shells (e.g. hazelnut, acorn). Vegetables, so-called, typically are savory or non-sweet produce (e.g. zucchini, lettuce, broccoli, and tomato). But some may be sweet-tasting (sweet potato).

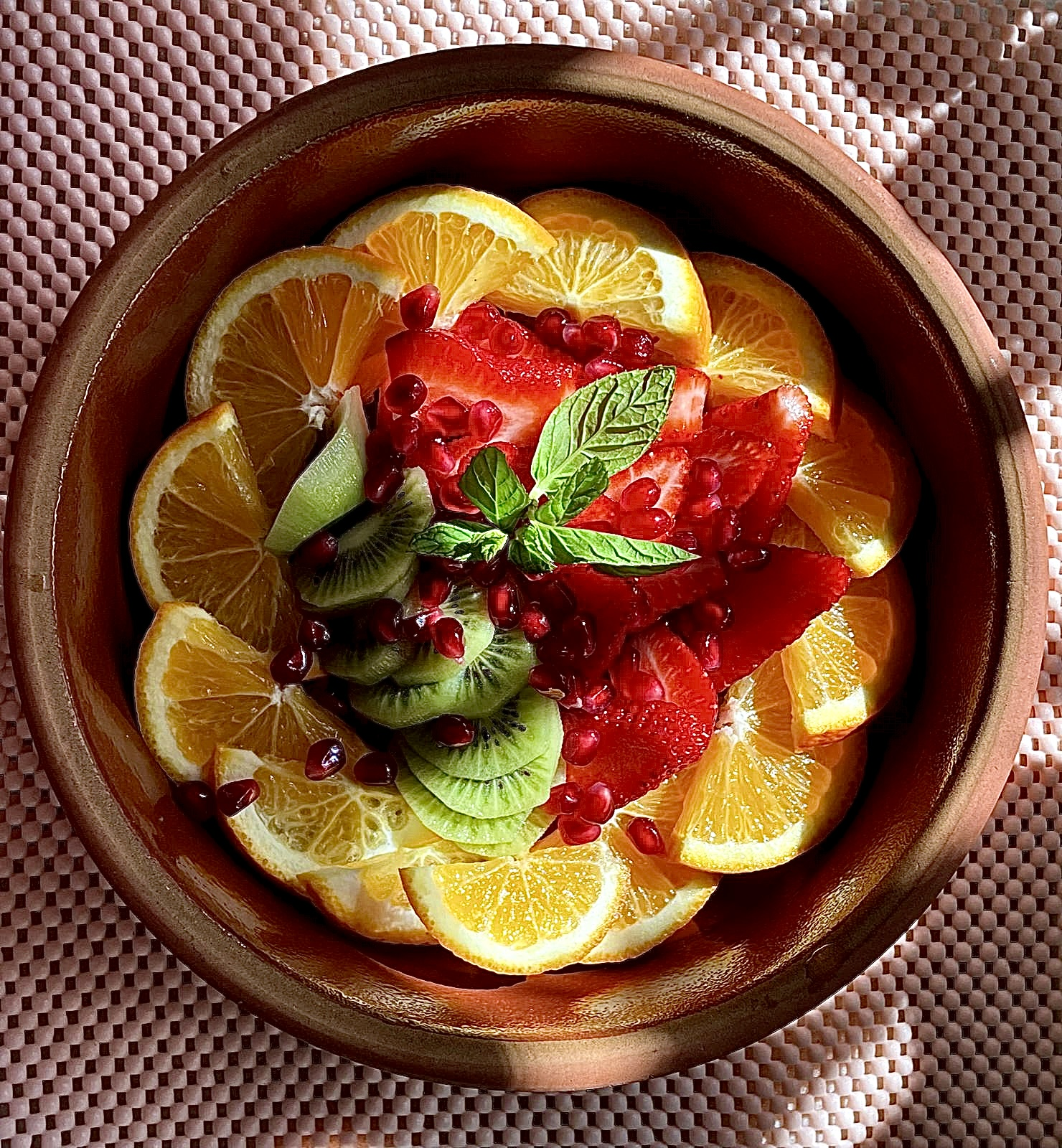
Fresh fruit plate

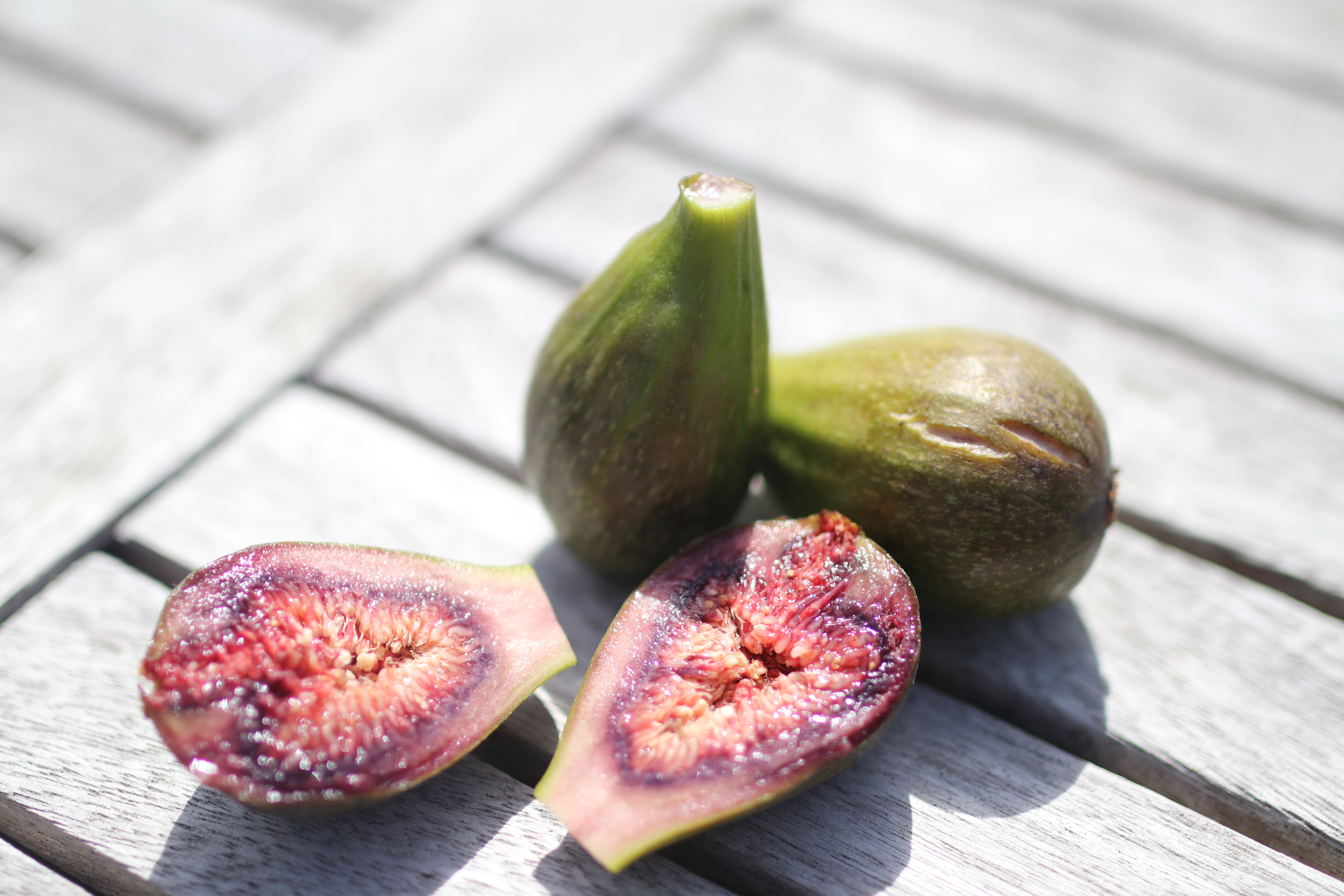
Fresh figs

Examples of botanically classified fruit that are typically called vegetables include cucumber, pumpkin, and squash or other winter squashes (all are cucurbits); beans, peanuts, and peas (all legumes); and corn, eggplant, bell pepper (or sweet pepper), and tomato. Many spices are fruits, botanically speaking, including black pepper, chili pepper, cumin and allspice. In contrast, rhubarb is often called a fruit when used in making pies, but the edible produce of rhubarb is actually the leaf stalk or petiole of the plant.

Botanically, a cereal grain, such as corn, rice, or wheat is a kind of fruit (termed a caryopsis). However, the fruit wall is thin and fused to the seed coat, so almost all the edible grain-fruit is actually a seed.

Plant parts eaten as "vegetables" or as "fruits"
Botanical part	Examples eaten as "vegetables"	Examples eaten as "fruits"
Fruit	Aubergine, bean, bell pepper, courgette, cucumber, maize, pea, tomato	Apple, banana, cherry, currant, date, grape, melon, orange, peach, plum
Stem		Angelica
Petiole (leaf stalk)	Celery	Rhubarb
Flower bud	Globe artichoke	
Leaf	Cabbage, lettuce, spinach	
Bulb	Garlic, onion	
Root	Beet, carrot	
Tuber	Cassava, Jerusalem artichoke, potato	

== Structure ==
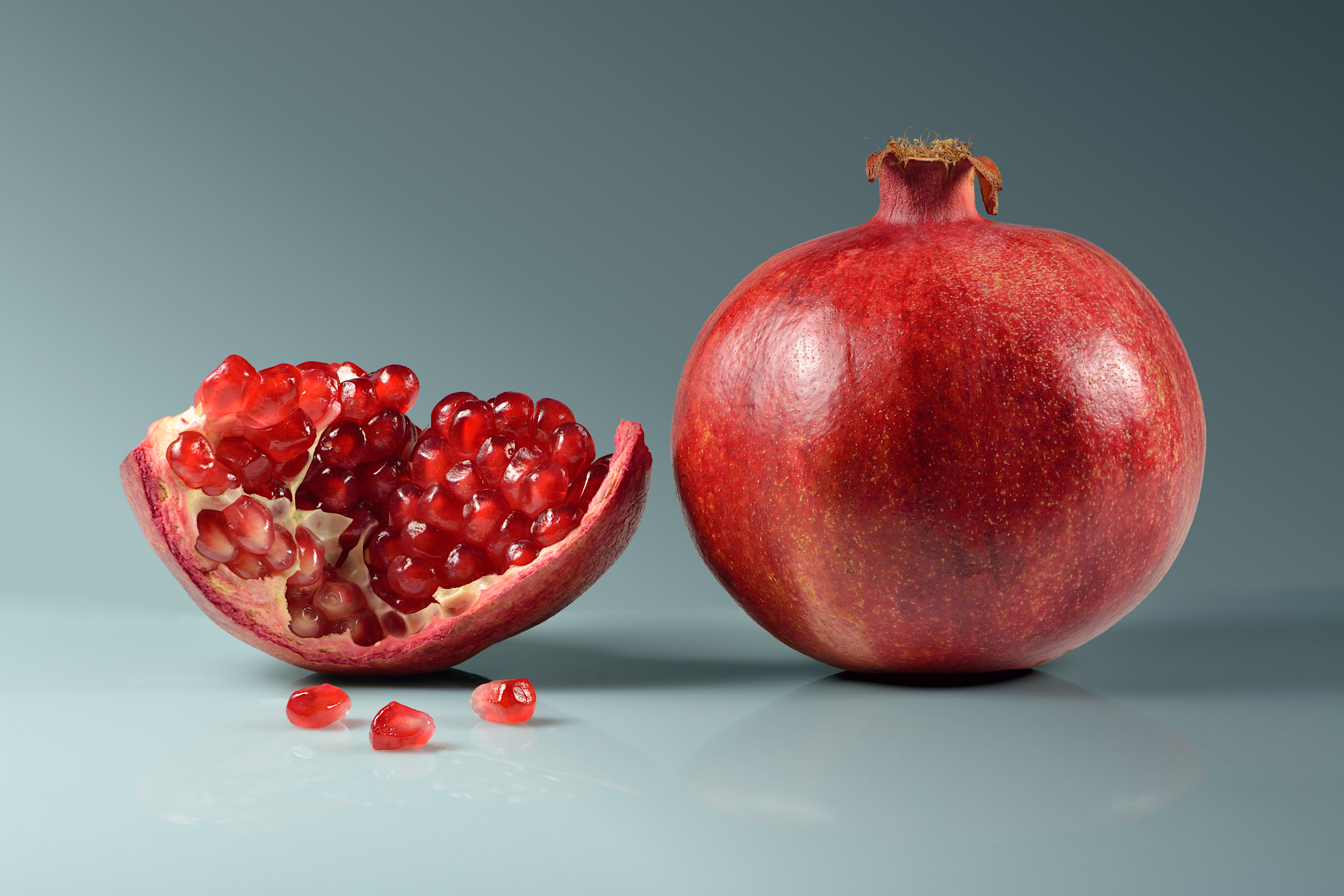
Pomegranate fruit – whole and piece with arils

The outer layer, often edible, of most fruits is called the pericarp. Typically formed from the ovary, it surrounds the seeds; in some species, however, other structural tissues contribute to or form the edible portion. The pericarp may be described in three layers from outer to inner, i.e., the epicarp, mesocarp and endocarp.

Fruit that bears a prominent pointed terminal projection is said to be beaked.

== Development ==
A fruit results from the fertilizing and maturing of one or more flowers. The gynoecium, which contains the stigma-style-ovary system, is centered in the flower-head, and it forms all or part of the fruit. Inside the ovary(ies) are one or more ovules. Here begins a complex sequence called double fertilization: a female gametophyte produces an egg cell for the purpose of fertilization. (A female gametophyte is called a megagametophyte or embryo sac.) After double fertilization, the ovules become seeds.

Ovules are fertilized in a process that starts with pollination, which is the movement of pollen from the stamens to the stigma-style-ovary system within the flower-head. After pollination, a pollen tube grows from the (deposited) pollen through the stigma down the style into the ovary to the ovule. Two sperm are transferred from the pollen to a megagametophyte. Within the megagametophyte, one sperm unites with the egg, forming a zygote, while the second sperm enters the central cell forming the endosperm mother cell, which completes the double fertilization process. Later, the zygote will give rise to the embryo of the seed, and the endosperm mother cell will give rise to endosperm, a nutritive tissue used by the embryo.

Fruit formation is associated with meiosis, a central aspect of sexual reproduction in flowering plants. During meiosis homologous chromosomes replicate, recombine and randomly segregate, and then undergo segregation of sister chromatids to produce haploid cells. Union of haploid nuclei from pollen and ovule (fertilisation), occurring either by self- or cross-pollination, leads to the formation of a diploid zygote that can then develop into an embryo within the emerging seed. Repeated fertilisations within the ovary are accompanied by maturation of the ovary to form the fruit.

As the ovules develop into seeds, the ovary begins to ripen and the ovary wall, the pericarp, may become fleshy (as in berries or drupes), or it may form a hard outer covering (as in nuts). In some multi-seeded fruits, the extent to which a fleshy structure develops is proportional to the number of fertilized ovules. The pericarp typically is differentiated into two or three distinct layers; these are called the exocarp (outer layer, epicarp), mesocarp (middle layer), and endocarp (inner layer).

In some fruits, the sepals, petals, stamens or the style of the flower fall away as the fleshy fruit ripens. However, for simple fruits derived from an inferior ovary – i.e., one that lies below the attachment of other floral parts – there are parts (including petals, sepals, and stamens) that fuse with the ovary and ripen with it. For such a case, when floral parts other than the ovary form a significant part of the fruit that develops, it is called an accessory fruit. Examples of accessory fruits include apple, rose hip, strawberry, and pineapple.

Because several parts of the flower besides the ovary may contribute to the structure of a fruit, it is important to understand how a particular fruit forms. There are three general modes of fruit development:

- Apocarpous fruits develop from a single flower (while having one or more separate, unfused, carpels); they are the simple fruits.
- Syncarpous fruits develop from a single gynoecium (having two or more carpels fused together).
- Multiple fruits form from many flowers – i.e., an inflorescence of flowers.
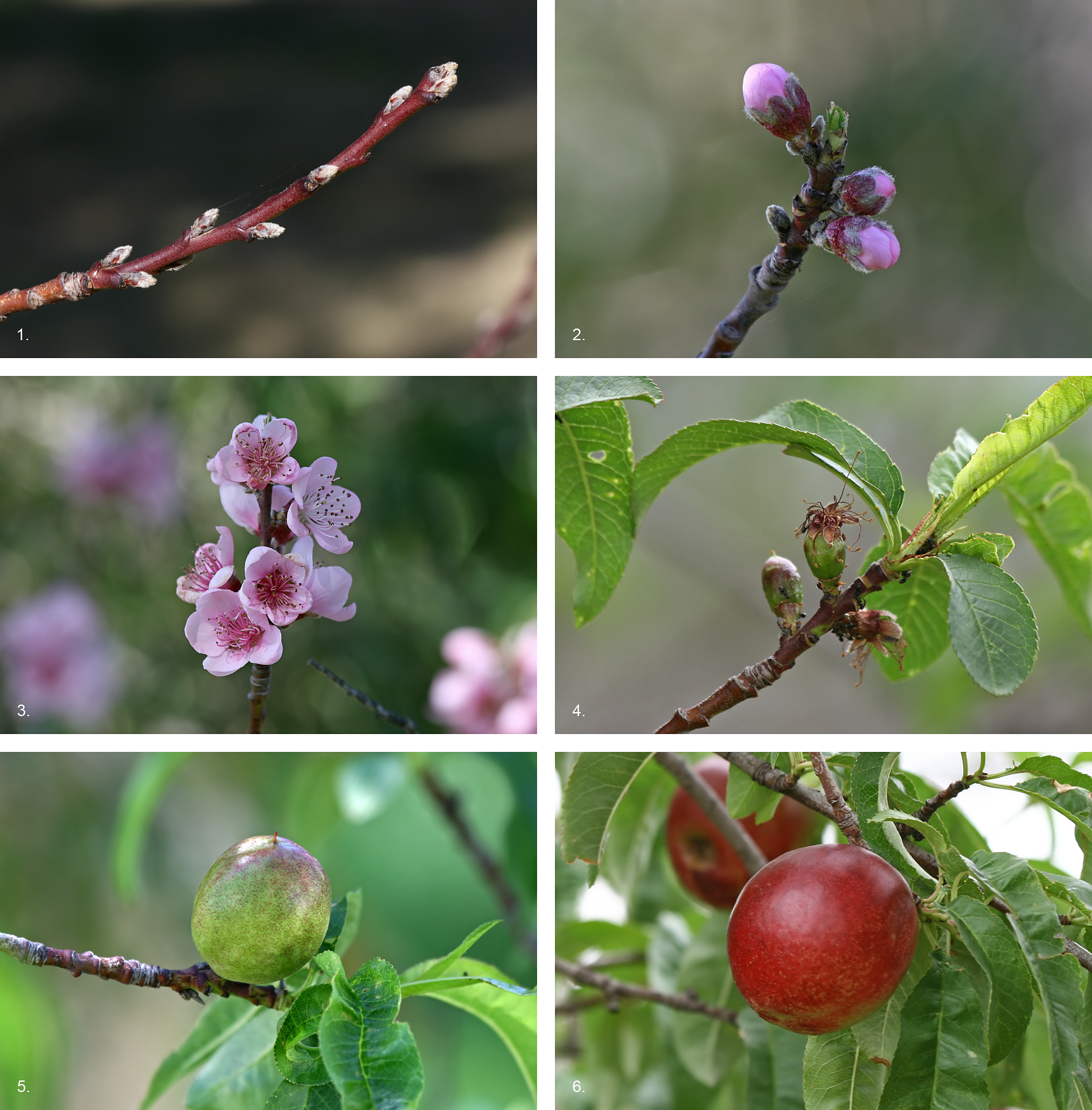
The development sequence of a typical drupe, the nectarine (Prunus persica) over a 7.5-month period, from bud formation in early winter to fruit ripening in midsummer

The parts of a flower, showing the stigma-style-ovary system.

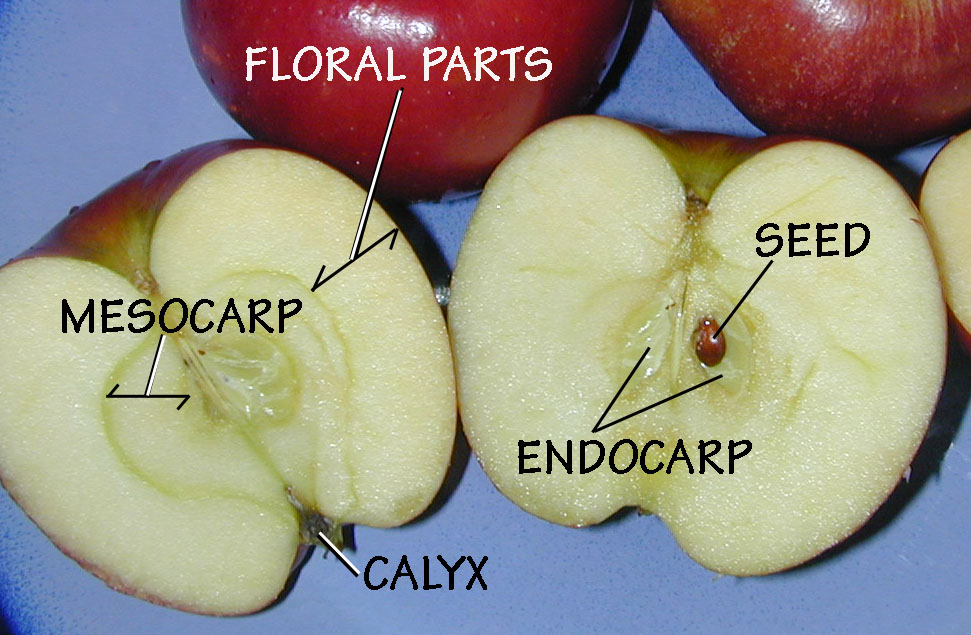
An apple is a simple, fleshy fruit. Key parts are the epicarp, or exocarp, or outer skin (not labelled); and the mesocarp and endocarp (labelled).

Insertion point: There are three positions of insertion of the ovary at the base of a flower: I superior; II half-inferior; III inferior. The 'insertion point' is where the androecium parts (a), the petals (p), and the sepals (s) all converge and attach to the receptacle (r). (Ovary=gynoecium (g).)

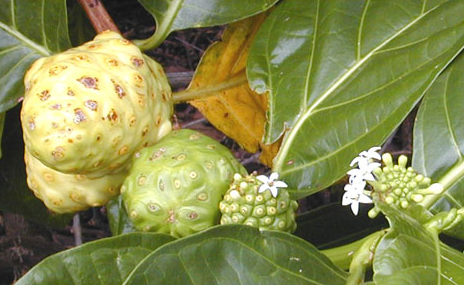
In the noni, flowers are produced in time-sequence along the stem. It is possible to see a progression of flowering, fruit development, and fruit ripening.

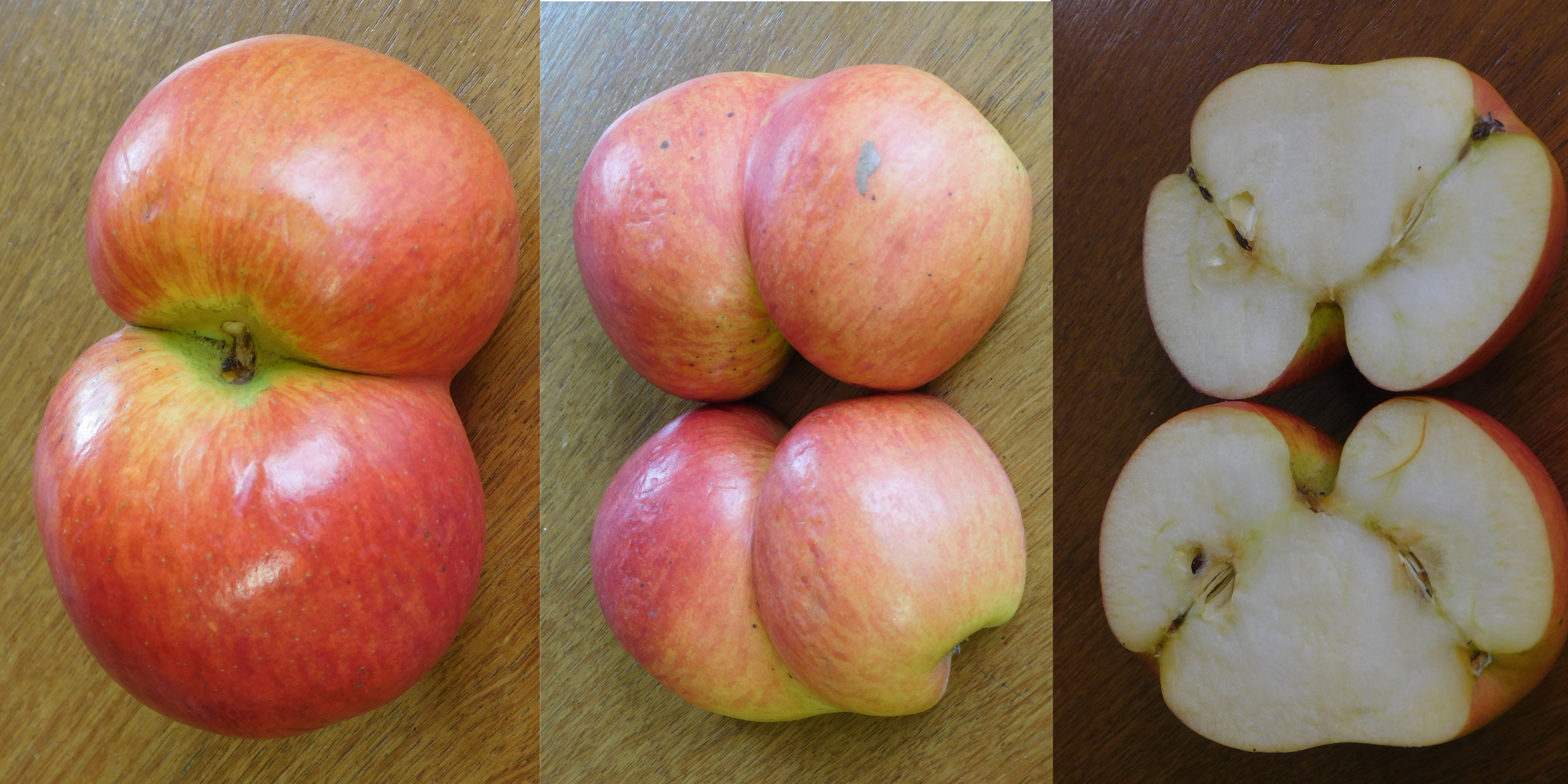
Twin apples

== Types ==
Consistent with the three modes of fruit development, plant scientists have classified fruits into three main groups: simple fruits, aggregate fruits, and multiple (or composite) fruits. The groupings reflect how the ovary and other flower organs are arranged and how the fruits develop, but they are not evolutionarily relevant as diverse plant taxa may be in the same group.

While the section of a fungus that produces spores is called a fruiting body, fungi are members of the fungi kingdom and not of the plant kingdom.

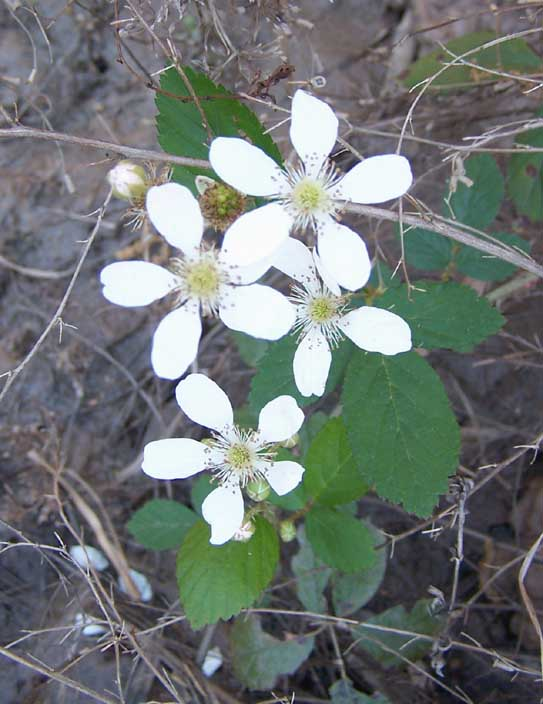
Dewberry flowers. Note the multiple pistils, each of which will produce a drupelet. Each flower will become a blackberry-like aggregate fruit.

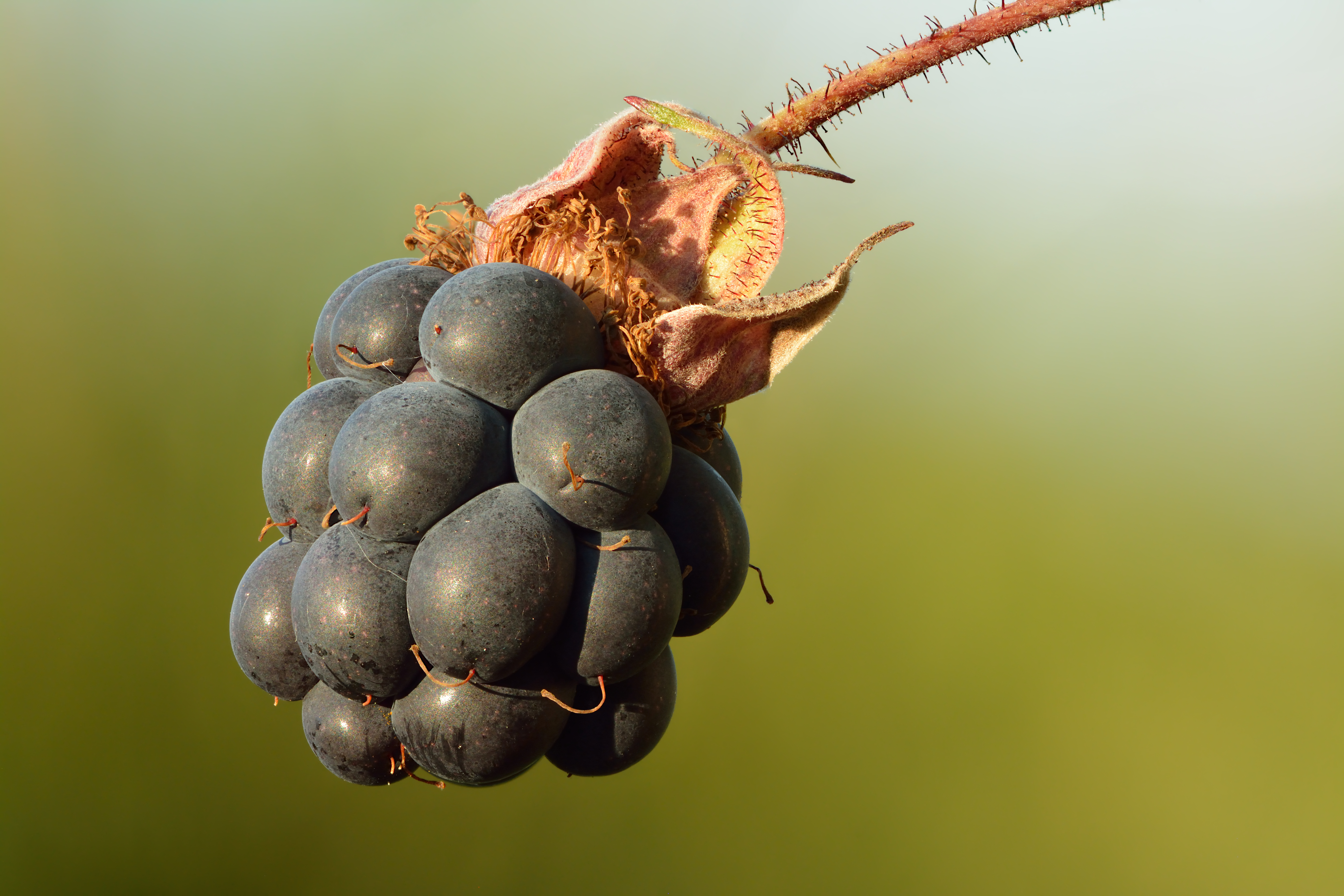
Dewberry fruit

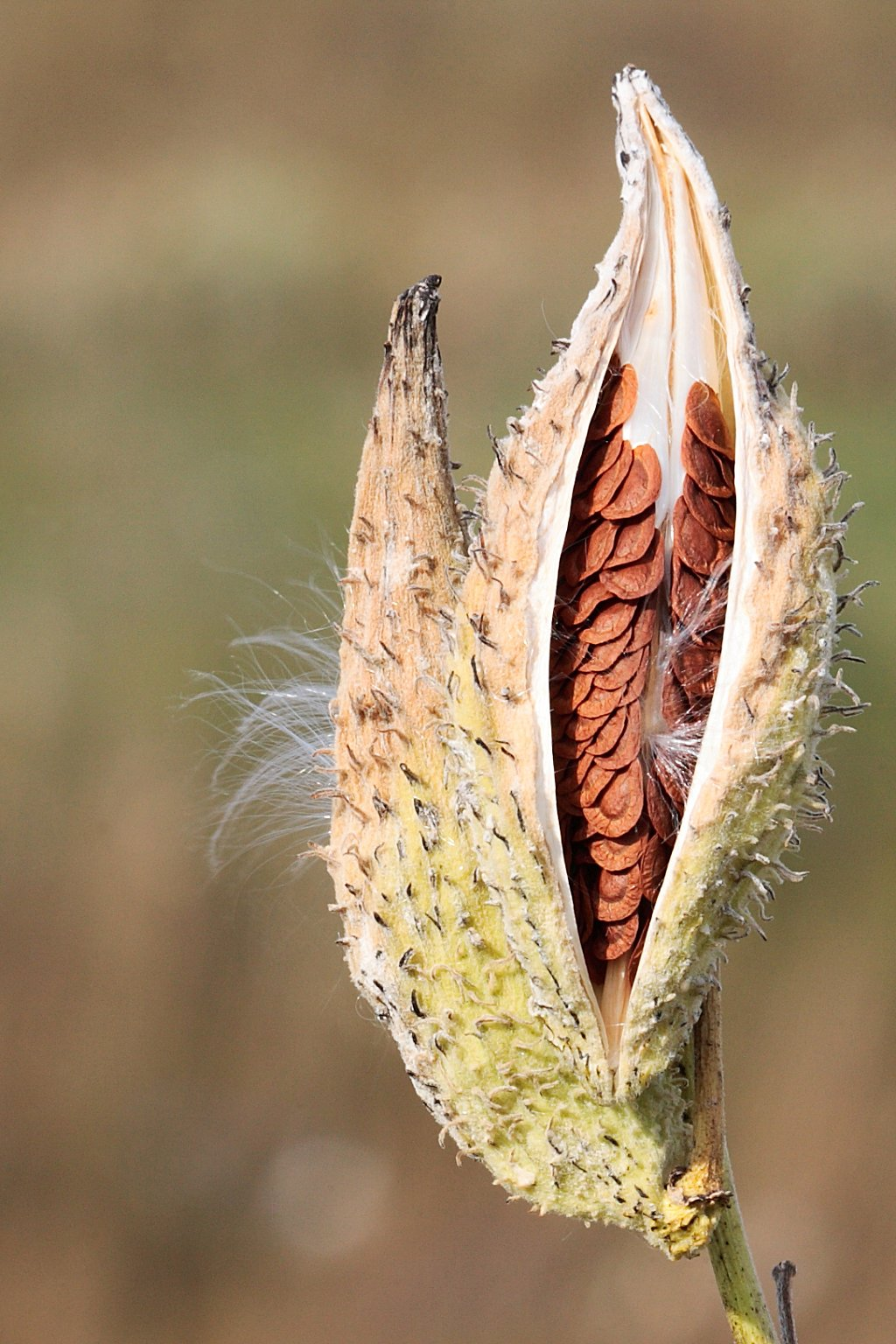
A dry simple fruit: milkweed (Asclepias syriaca); dehiscence of the follicular fruit reveals seeds within

=== Simple fruits ===
Simple fruits are the result of the ripening-to-fruit of a simple or compound ovary in a single flower with a single pistil. In contrast, a single flower with numerous pistils typically produces an aggregate fruit; and the merging of several flowers, or a 'multiple' of flowers, results in a 'multiple' fruit. A simple fruit is further classified as either dry or fleshy.

To distribute their seeds, dry fruits may split open and discharge their seeds to the winds, which is called dehiscence. Or the distribution process may rely upon the decay and degradation of the fruit to expose the seeds; or it may rely upon the eating of fruit and excreting of seeds by frugivores – both are called indehiscence. Fleshy fruits do not dehisce, and may rely on frugivores for distribution of their seeds. Typically, the entire outer layer of the ovary wall ripens into a potentially edible pericarp.

Types of dry simple fruits, (with examples) include:

- Achene – most commonly seen in aggregate fruits (e.g., strawberry, see below)
- Capsule – (Brazil nut: botanically, it is not a nut)
- Caryopsis – (cereal grains, including wheat, rice, oats, barley)
- Cypsela – an achene-like fruit derived from the individual florets in a capitulum: (dandelion)
- Fibrous drupe – (coconut, walnut: botanically, neither is a true nut.)
- Follicle – follicles are formed from a single carpel, and opens by one suture: (milkweed); commonly seen in aggregate fruits: (magnolia, peony)
- Legume – (bean, pea, peanut: botanically, the peanut is the seed of a legume, not a nut)
- Loment – a type of indehiscent legume: (sweet vetch or wild potato)
- Nut – (beechnut, hazelnut, acorn (of the oak): botanically, these are true nuts)
- Samara – (ash, elm, maple key)
- Schizocarp, see below – (carrot seed)
- Silique – (radish seed)
- Silicle – (shepherd's purse)
- Utricle – (beet, Rumex)

Fruits in which part or all of the pericarp (fruit wall) is fleshy at maturity are termed fleshy simple fruits.

Types of fleshy simple fruits, (with examples) include:

- Berry – the berry is the most common type of fleshy fruit. The entire outer layer of the ovary wall ripens into a potentially edible "pericarp", (see below).
- Stone fruit or drupe – the definitive characteristic of a drupe is the hard, "lignified" stone (sometimes called the "pit"). It is derived from the ovary wall of the flower: apricot, cherry, olive, peach, plum, mango.
- Pome – the pome fruits: apples, pears, rosehips, saskatoon berry, etc., are a syncarpous (fused) fleshy fruit, a simple fruit, developing from a half-inferior ovary. Pomes are of the family Rosaceae.

==== Berries ====
Berries are a type of simple fleshy fruit that issue from a single ovary. (The ovary itself may be compound, with several carpels.) The botanical term true berry includes grapes, currants, cucumbers, eggplants (aubergines), tomatoes, chili peppers, and bananas, but excludes certain fruits that are called "-berry" by culinary custom or by common usage of the term – such as strawberries and raspberries. Berries may be formed from one or more carpels (i.e., from the simple or compound ovary) from the same, single flower. Seeds typically are embedded in the fleshy interior of the ovary.

Examples include:

- Tomato – in culinary terms, the tomato is regarded as a vegetable, but it is botanically classified as a fruit and a berry.
- Banana – the fruit has been described as a "leathery berry". In cultivated varieties, the seeds are diminished nearly to non-existence.
- Pepo – berries with skin that is hardened: cucurbits, including gourds, squash, melons.
- Hesperidium – berries with a rind and a juicy interior: most citrus fruit.
- Cranberry, gooseberry, redcurrant, grape.

The strawberry, regardless of its appearance, is classified as a dry, not a fleshy fruit. Botanically, it is not a berry; it is an aggregate-accessory fruit, the latter term meaning the fleshy part is derived not from the plant's ovaries but from the receptacle that holds the ovaries. Numerous dry achenes are attached to the outside of the fruit-flesh; they appear to be seeds but each is actually an ovary of a flower, with a seed inside.

Schizocarps are dry fruits, though some appear to be fleshy. They originate from syncarpous ovaries but do not actually dehisce; rather, they split into segments with one or more seeds. They include a number of different forms from a wide range of families, including carrot, parsnip, parsley, cumin.

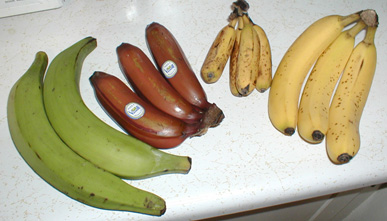
Fruits of four different banana cultivars. (Bananas are berries.)

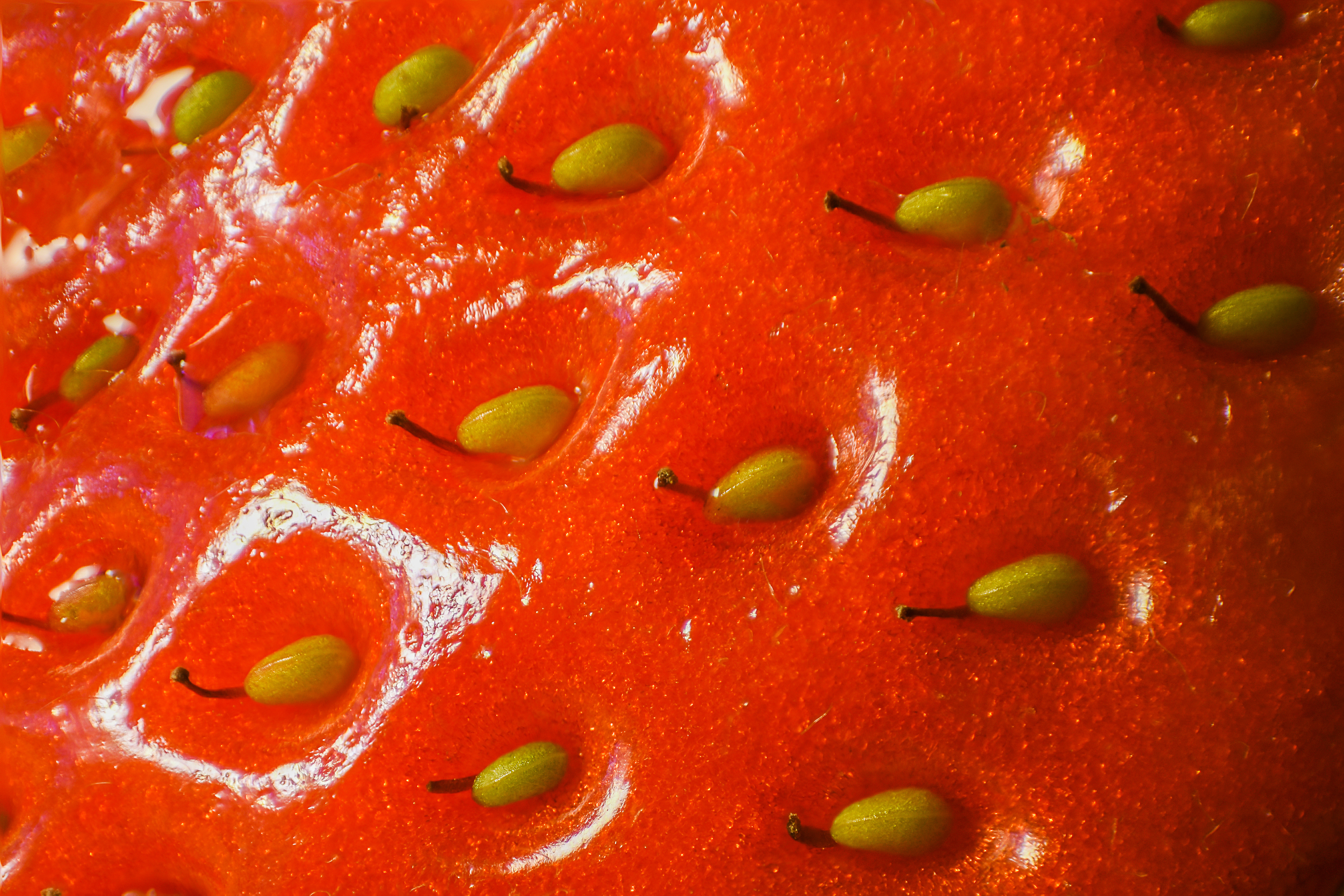
Strawberry, showing achenes attached to surface. Botanically, strawberries are not berries; they are classified as an aggregate accessory fruit.

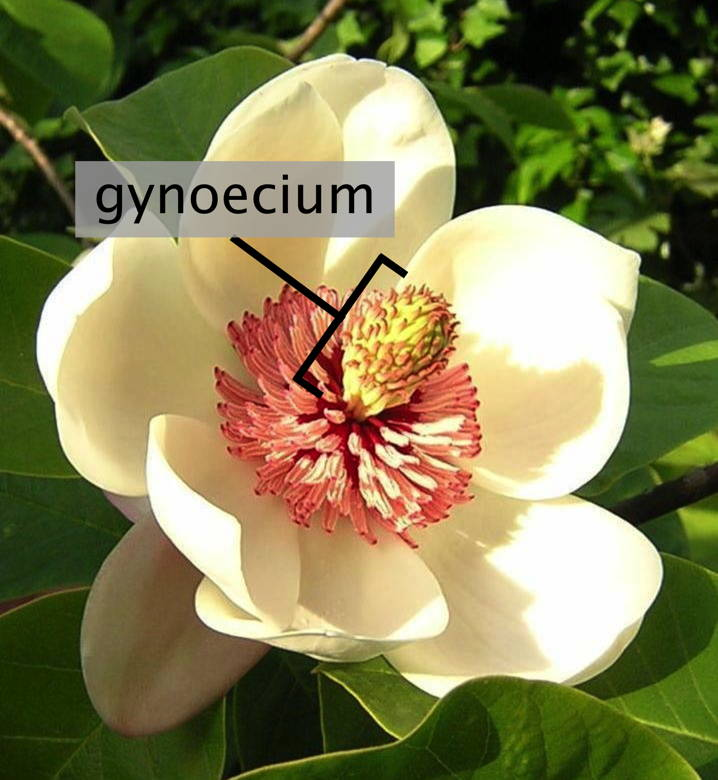
Flower of Magnolia × wieseneri showing the many pistils making up the gynoecium in the middle of the flower. The fruit of this flower is an aggregation of follicles.

=== Aggregate fruits ===
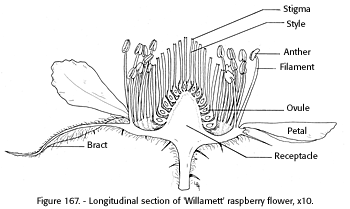
Detail of the raspberry flower: there is a clustering of pistils at the center of the flower. (A pistil consists of stigma, style, and ovary.) The stigma is the apical (at the apex) nodule that receives pollen; the style is the stem-like column that extends down to the ovary, which is the basal part that contains the seed-forming ovule.

An aggregate fruit, aggregation, or etaerio develops from a single flower that presents numerous simple pistils. Each pistil contains one carpel; together, they form a fruitlet. Different types of aggregate fruits consist of multiple achenes, drupelets, follicles, and berries.

- For example, the Ranunculaceae species, including Clematis and Ranunculus, produces an etaerio of achenes;
- Rubus species, including raspberry: an etaerio of drupelets;
- Calotropis species: an etaerio of follicles fruit;
- Annona species: an etaerio of berries.

Some other broadly recognized species and their etaerios (or aggregations) are:

- Teasel; fruit is an aggregation of cypselas.
- Tuliptree; fruit is an aggregation of samaras.
- Magnolia and peony; fruit is an aggregation of follicles.
- American sweet gum; fruit is an aggregation of capsules.
- Sycamore; fruit is an aggregation of achenes.

The pistils of the raspberry are called drupelets because each pistil is like a small drupe attached to the receptacle. In some bramble fruits, such as blackberry, the receptacle, an accessory part, elongates and then develops as part of the fruit, making the blackberry an aggregate-accessory fruit. The strawberry is an aggregate-accessory fruit, with its seeds in achenes.

=== Hybrid fruits ===
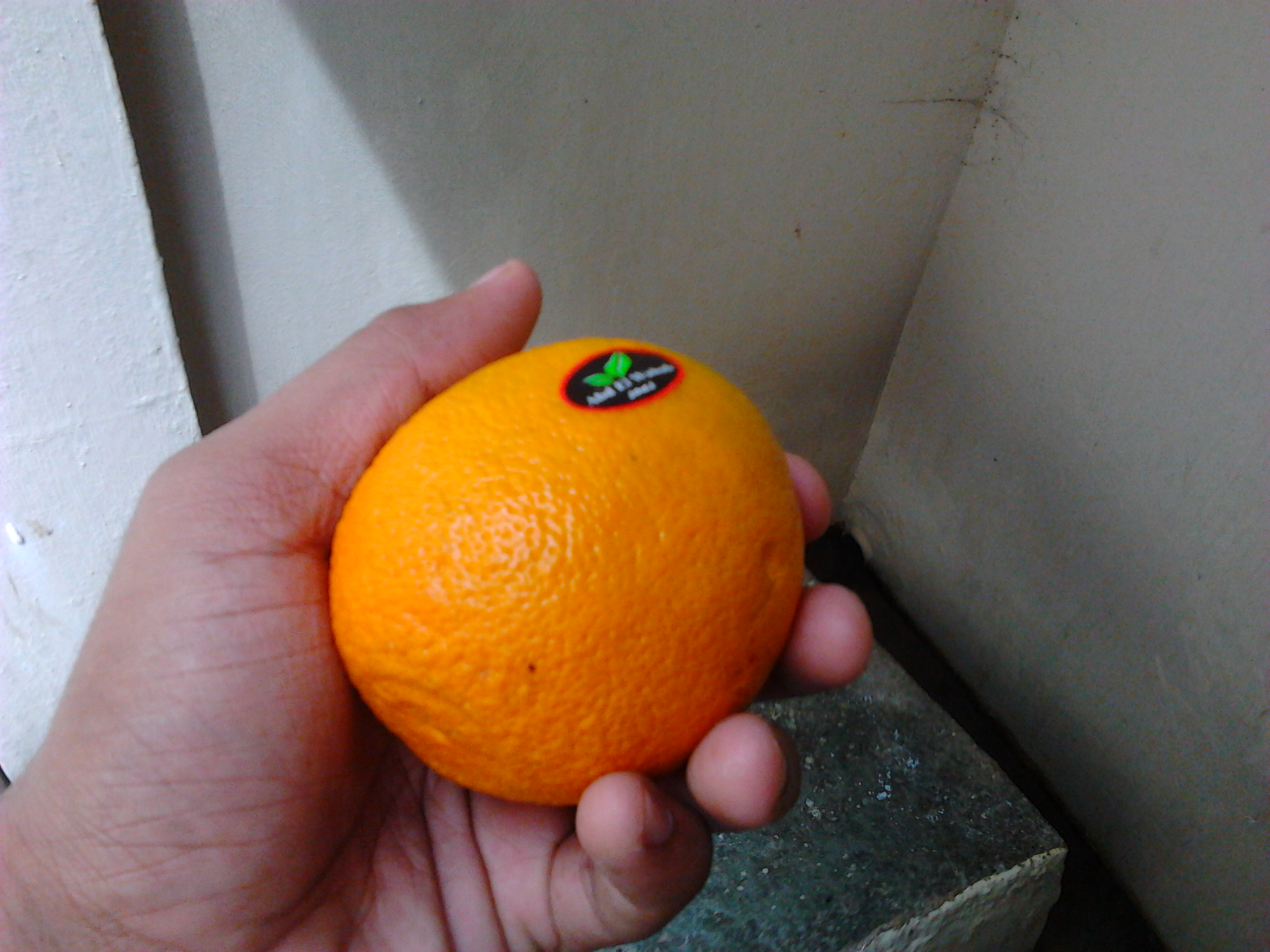
A rangpur

Hybrid fruits such as tayberry and strawberry are created through the controlled speciation of fruits that creates new varieties and cross-breeds. Hybrids are grown using plant propagation to create new cultivars. This may introduce an entirely new type of fruit or improve the properties of an existing fruit.

=== Multiple fruits ===
A multiple fruit such as a fig or mulberry is formed from a cluster of flowers, an inflorescence. Each ('smallish') flower produces a single fruitlet, which, as all develop, all merge into one mass of fruit.

== Seedless fruits ==
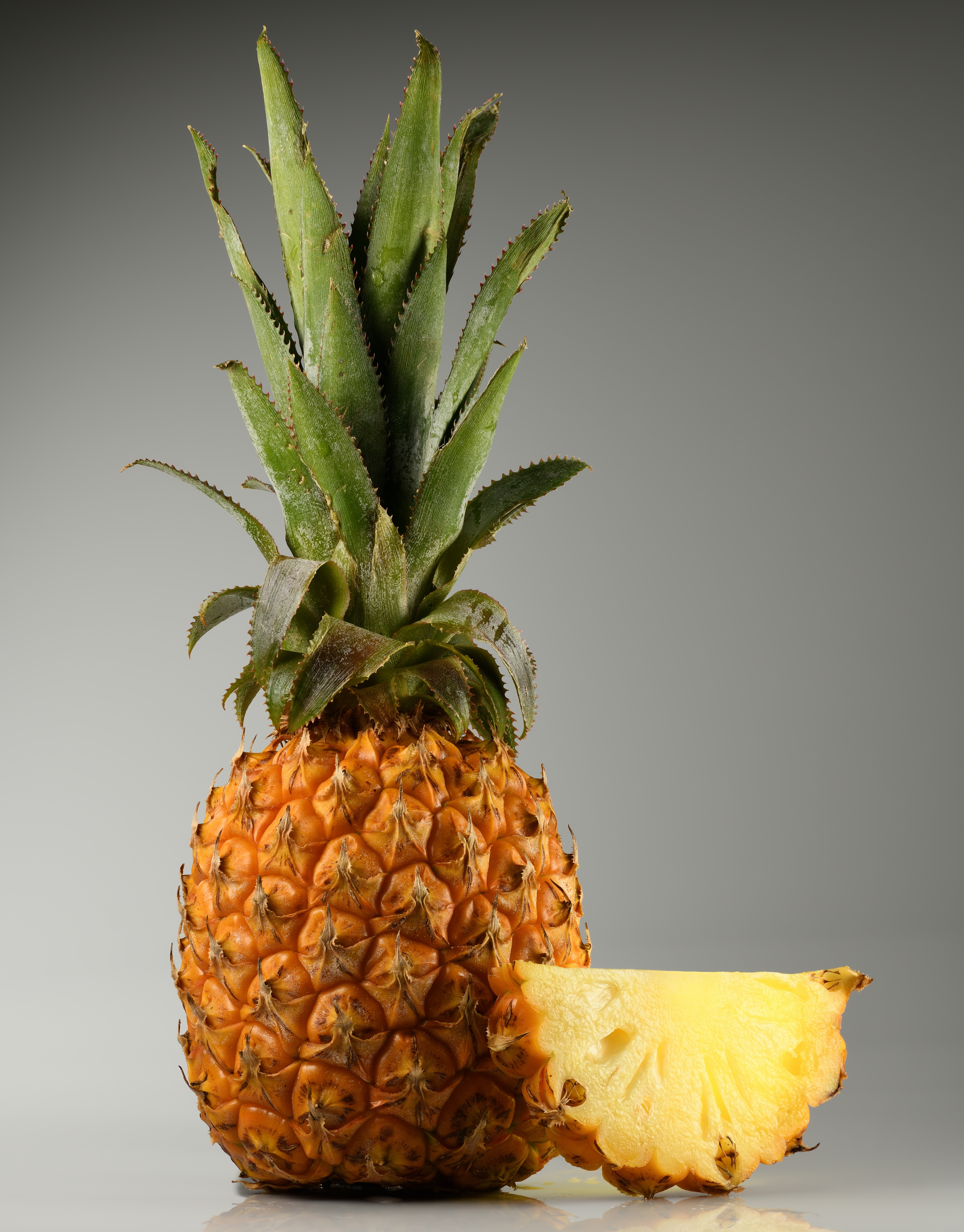
The fruit of a pineapple includes tissue from the sepals as well as the pistils of many flowers. It is a multiple-accessory fruit.

Seedlessness is an important feature of some fruits of commerce. Commercial cultivars of bananas and pineapples are examples of seedless fruits. Some cultivars of citrus fruits, table grapes, and watermelons are valued for their seedlessness. In some species, seedlessness is the result of parthenocarpy, where fruits set without fertilization. Parthenocarpic fruit-set may (or may not) require pollination, but most seedless citrus fruits require a stimulus from pollination to produce fruit. Seedless bananas and grapes are triploids, and seedlessness results from the abortion of the embryonic plant that is produced by fertilization, a phenomenon known as stenospermocarpy, which requires normal pollination and fertilization.

== Seed dispersal ==
Variations in fruit structures largely depend on the modes of dispersal applied to their seeds. Dispersal is achieved by wind or water, by explosive dehiscence, and by interactions with animals.

Some fruits present their outer skins or shells coated with spikes or hooked burrs; these evolved either to deter would-be foragers from feeding on them or to serve to attach themselves to the hair, feathers, legs, or clothing of animals, thereby using them as dispersal agents. These plants are termed zoochorous; common examples include cocklebur, unicorn plant, and beggarticks (or Spanish needle).

By developments of mutual evolution, the fleshy produce of fruits typically appeals to hungry animals, such that the seeds contained within are taken in, carried away, and later deposited (i.e., defecated) at a distance from the parent plant. Likewise, the nutritious, oily kernels of nuts typically motivate birds and squirrels to hoard them, burying them in soil to retrieve later during the winter of scarcity; thereby, uneaten seeds are sown effectively under natural conditions to germinate and grow a new plant some distance away from the parent.

Other fruits have evolved flattened and elongated wings or helicopter-like blades, e.g., elm, maple, and tuliptree. This mechanism increases dispersal distance away from the parent via wind. Other wind-dispersed fruit have tiny "parachutes", e.g., dandelion, milkweed, salsify.

Coconut fruits can float for some time in the ocean, thereby spreading their seeds. Other fruits that can disperse via water are nipa palm and screw pine.

Some fruits have evolved propulsive mechanisms that fling seeds substantial distances – perhaps up to 100 m (330 ft) in the case of the sandbox tree – via explosive dehiscence or other such mechanisms (see impatiens and squirting cucumber).

== Food uses ==
A large variety of fruits – fleshy (simple) fruits from apples to berries to watermelon; dry (simple) fruits including beans and rice and coconuts; aggregate fruits including strawberries, raspberries, blackberries, pawpaw; and multiple fruits such as pineapple, fig, mulberries – are commercially valuable as human food. They are eaten both fresh and as jams, marmalade and other fruit preserves. They are used extensively in manufactured and processed foods (cakes, cookies, baked goods, flavorings, ice cream, yogurt, canned vegetables, frozen vegetables and meals) and beverages such as fruit juices and alcoholic beverages (brandy, fruit beer, wine). Spices like vanilla, black pepper, paprika, and allspice are derived from berries. Olive fruit is pressed for olive oil and similar processing is applied to other oil-bearing fruits and vegetables. Some fruits are available all year round, while others (such as blackberries and apricots in the UK) are subject to seasonal availability.

Fruits are used for socializing and gift-giving in the form of fruit baskets and fruit bouquets.

Typically, many botanical fruits – "vegetables" in culinary parlance – (including tomato, green beans, leaf greens, bell pepper, cucumber, eggplant, okra, pumpkin, squash, zucchini) are bought and sold daily in fresh produce markets and greengroceries and carried back to kitchens, at home or restaurant, for preparation of meals.

Fruit consumption per capita

Fruit yield

Production of fruit

Cost comparison of fruit compared to other food groups, 2021

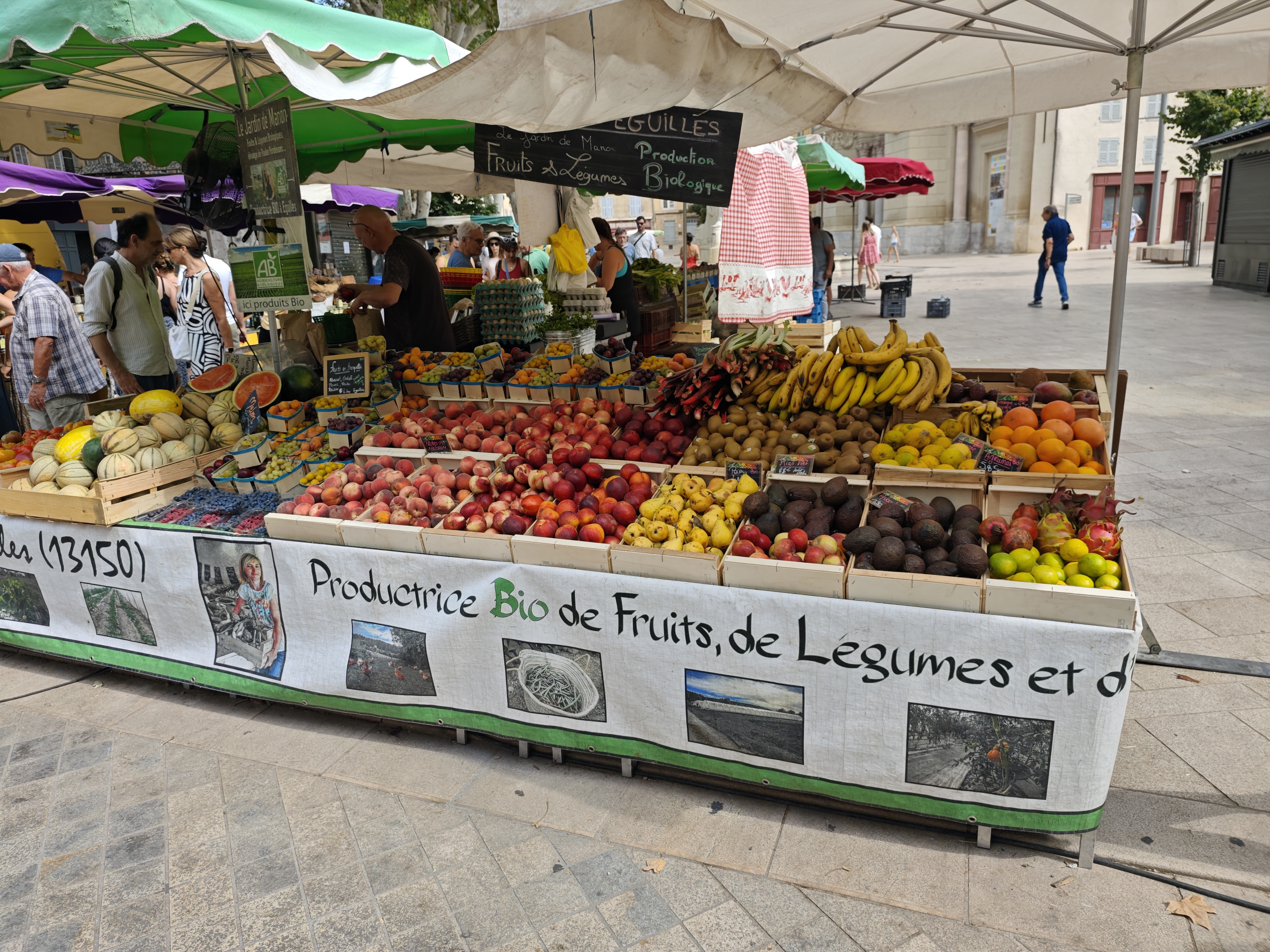
A selection of fruit for sale in a market in France

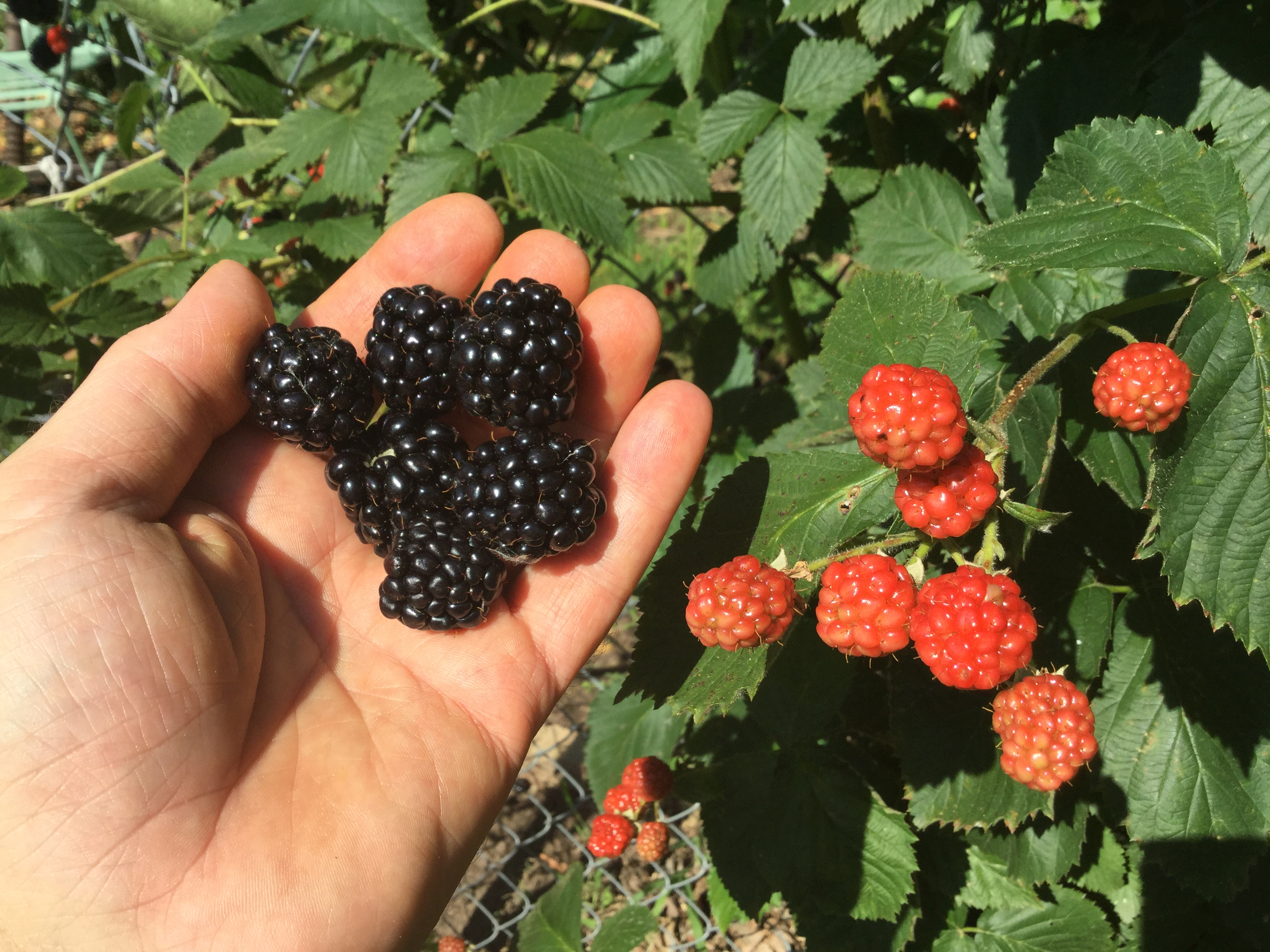
Picking blackberries in Oklahoma

=== Storage ===
All fruits benefit from proper post-harvest care, and in many fruits, the plant hormone ethylene causes ripening. Therefore, maintaining most fruits in an efficient cold chain is optimal for post-harvest storage, with the aim of extending and ensuring shelf life.

=== Nutritional value ===
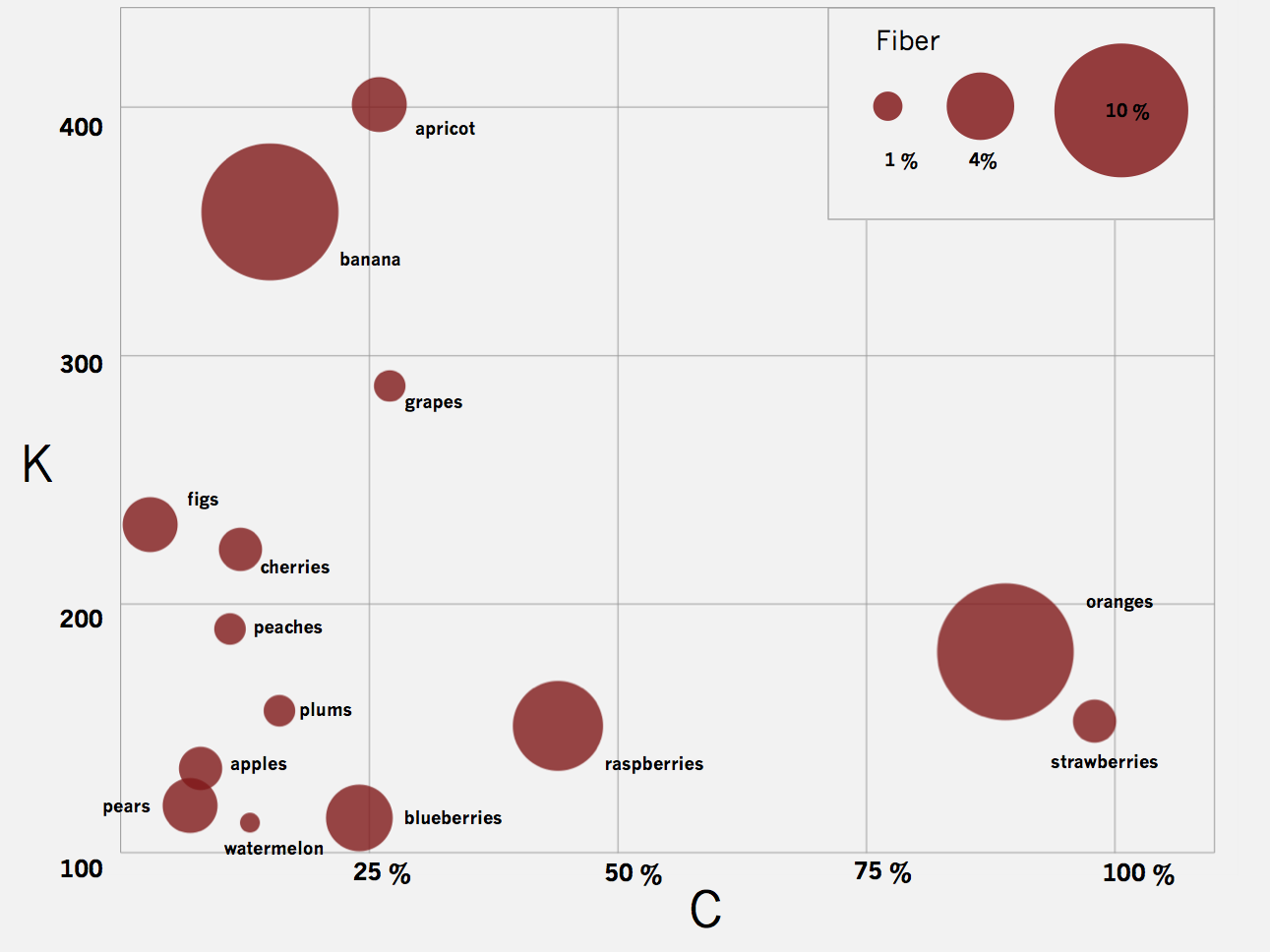
Comparing fresh fruits for fiber, potassium (K), and vitamin C. Each disk-point refers to a 100 g (3.5 oz) serving of the fresh fruit named. The size of the disk represents the amount of fiber (as percentage of the recommended daily allowance, RDA) in a serving of fruit (see key at upper right). The amount of vitamin C (as percent RDA) is plotted on the x–axis and the amount of potassium (K), in mg on the y–axis. Bananas are high in value for fiber and potassium, and oranges for fiber and vitamin C. (Apricots are highest in potassium; strawberries are rich in vitamin C.) Watermelon, providing low levels of both K and vitamin C and almost no fiber, is of least value for the three nutrients together.

A meta-analysis of 83 studies showed fruit or vegetable consumption is associated with reduced markers of inflammation (reduced tumor necrosis factor and C-reactive protein) and enhanced immune cell profile (increased gamma delta T cells).

Various culinary fruits provide significant amounts of fiber and water, and many are generally high in vitamin C. An overview of numerous studies showed that fruits (e.g., whole apples or whole oranges) are satisfying (filling) by simply eating and chewing them.

The dietary fiber consumed in eating fruit promotes satiety, and may help to control body weight and aid reduction of blood cholesterol, a risk factor for cardiovascular diseases. Fruit consumption is under preliminary research for the potential to improve nutrition and affect chronic diseases. Regular consumption of fruit is generally associated with reduced risks of several diseases and functional declines associated with aging.

=== Food safety ===
For food safety, the CDC recommends proper fruit handling and preparation to reduce the risk of food contamination and foodborne illness. Fresh fruits and vegetables should be carefully selected; at the store, they should not be damaged or bruised; and precut pieces should be refrigerated or surrounded by ice.

All fruits and vegetables should be rinsed before eating. This recommendation applies even to produce with rinds or skins that are not eaten. It should be done just before preparing or eating to avoid premature spoilage.

Fruits and vegetables should be kept separate from raw foods like meat, poultry, and seafood, as well as from utensils that have come in contact with raw foods. Fruits and vegetables that are not going to be cooked should be thrown away if they have touched raw meat, poultry, seafood, or eggs.

All cut, peeled, or cooked fruits and vegetables should be refrigerated within two hours. After a certain time, harmful bacteria may grow on them and increase the risk of foodborne illness.

=== Allergies ===
Fruit allergies make up about 10 percent of all food-related allergies.

== Nonfood uses ==
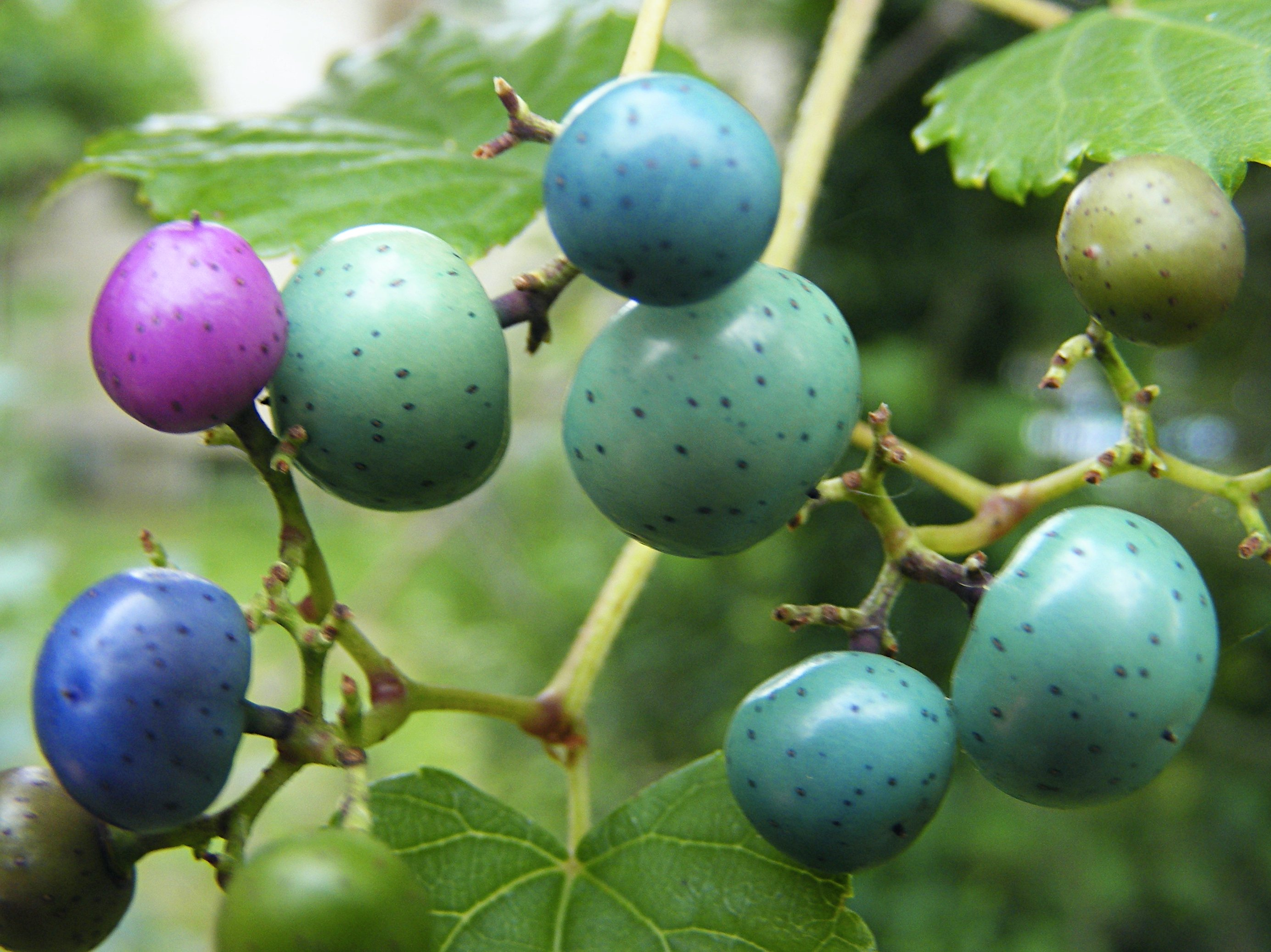
Porcelain vine is usually planted for its showy, colourful berries.

Because fruits have been such a major part of the human diet, various cultures have developed many different uses for fruits they do not depend on for food. For example:

- Bayberry fruits provide a wax often used to make candles;
- Many dry fruits are used as decorations or in dried flower arrangements (e.g., annual honesty, cotoneaster, lotus, milkweed, unicorn plant, and wheat). Ornamental trees and shrubs are often cultivated for their colorful fruits, including beautyberry, cotoneaster, holly, pyracantha, skimmia, and viburnum.
- Fruits of opium poppy are the source of opium, which contains the drugs codeine and morphine, as well as the biologically inactive chemical thebaine from which the drug oxycodone is synthesized.
- Osage orange fruits are used to repel cockroaches.
- Many fruits provide natural dyes (e.g., cherry, mulberry, sumac, and walnut).
- Dried gourds are used as bird houses, cups, decorations, dishes, musical instruments, and water jugs.
- Pumpkins are carved into Jack-o'-lanterns for Halloween.
- The fibrous core of the mature and dry Luffa fruit is used as a sponge.
- The spiny fruit of burdock or cocklebur inspired the invention of Velcro.
- Coir fiber from coconut shells is used for brushes, doormats, floor tiles, insulation, mattresses, sacking, and as a growing medium for container plants. The shell of the coconut fruit is used to make bird houses, bowls, cups, musical instruments, and souvenir heads.
- The hard and colorful grain fruits of Job's tears are used as decorative beads for jewelry, garments, and ritual objects.

== See also ==
- Fruit tree
- Fruitarianism
- List of countries by fruit production
- List of culinary fruits
- List of foods
- List of fruit dishes
