= Termarina rossa =

Variety of grape

Termarina rossa is a red Italian wine grape variety that is grown in the Emilia-Romagna region of northern Italy. The grape is unique among Vitis vinifera varieties in that it is naturally seedless. Historically Termarina rossa was grown in the provinces of Parma and Reggio Emilia for use in production of jams and saba, a sweet syrup, made from boiling the must but today it is used as a blending variety in some of Indicazione geografica tipica (IGT) wines of the area.

== History and relationship to other grapes ==
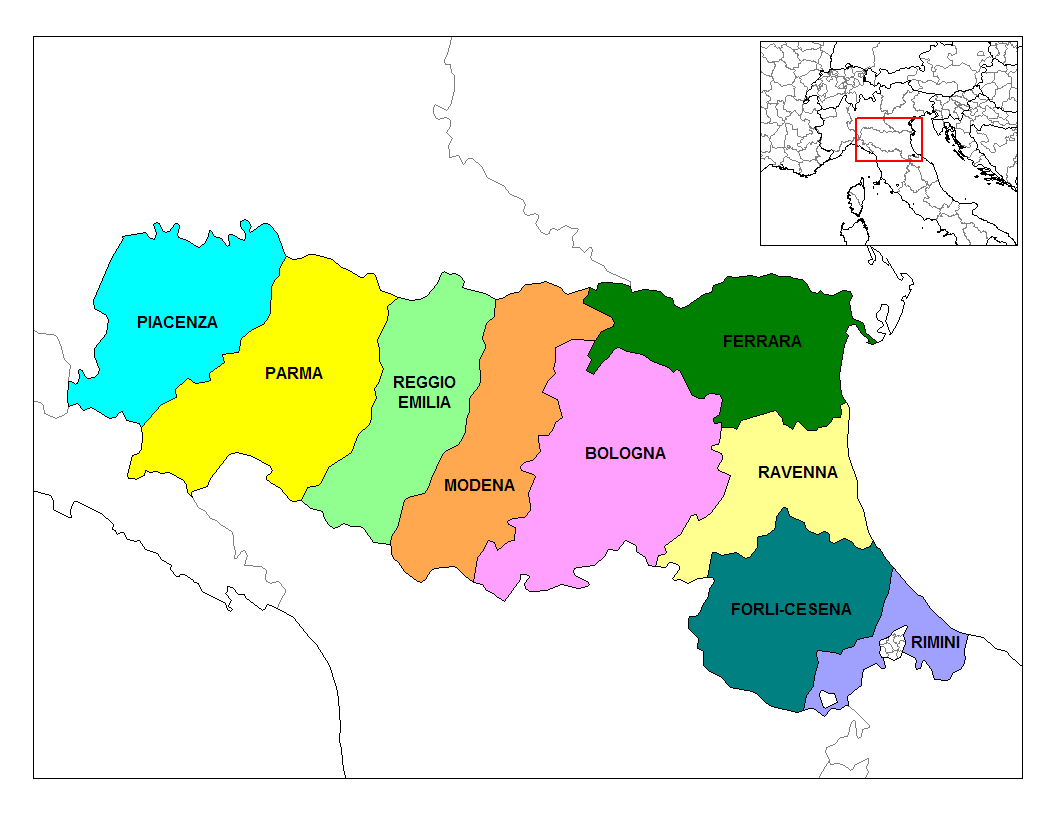
The Emilia-Romagna region where Termarina rossa has been planted since at least the 1840s.

The grape was first mentioned under the synonym Uva Passerina in Vincenzo Bertozzi's 1840 treatise on viticulture titled Viti della Provincia di Reggio Emilia. While Bertozzi also mentioned a white berried version of Termarina (and there is a white Passerina grape grown in the Marche region), DNA profiling has shown not relationship between Termarina and other Emilia-Romagna varieties and the grape doesn't appear to be a color mutation of Passerina or any grape that has been known as Termarina bianca.

There has been some speculation that Termarina rossa may be related to the seedless Greek wine grape Korinthiaki (known in Italy as Corinto nero) but DNA analysis in 2005 demonstrated that the two varieties are distinct with no known relationship.

== Viticulture ==
Termarina rossa is a naturally seedless Vitis vinifera that produces small berries containing high sugar content. This fruit may be used for syrup, wine, and jam. The grapevine can be vigorous and high yielding, requiring practices such as canopy management and pruning to maintain fruit quality.

== Wine regions ==
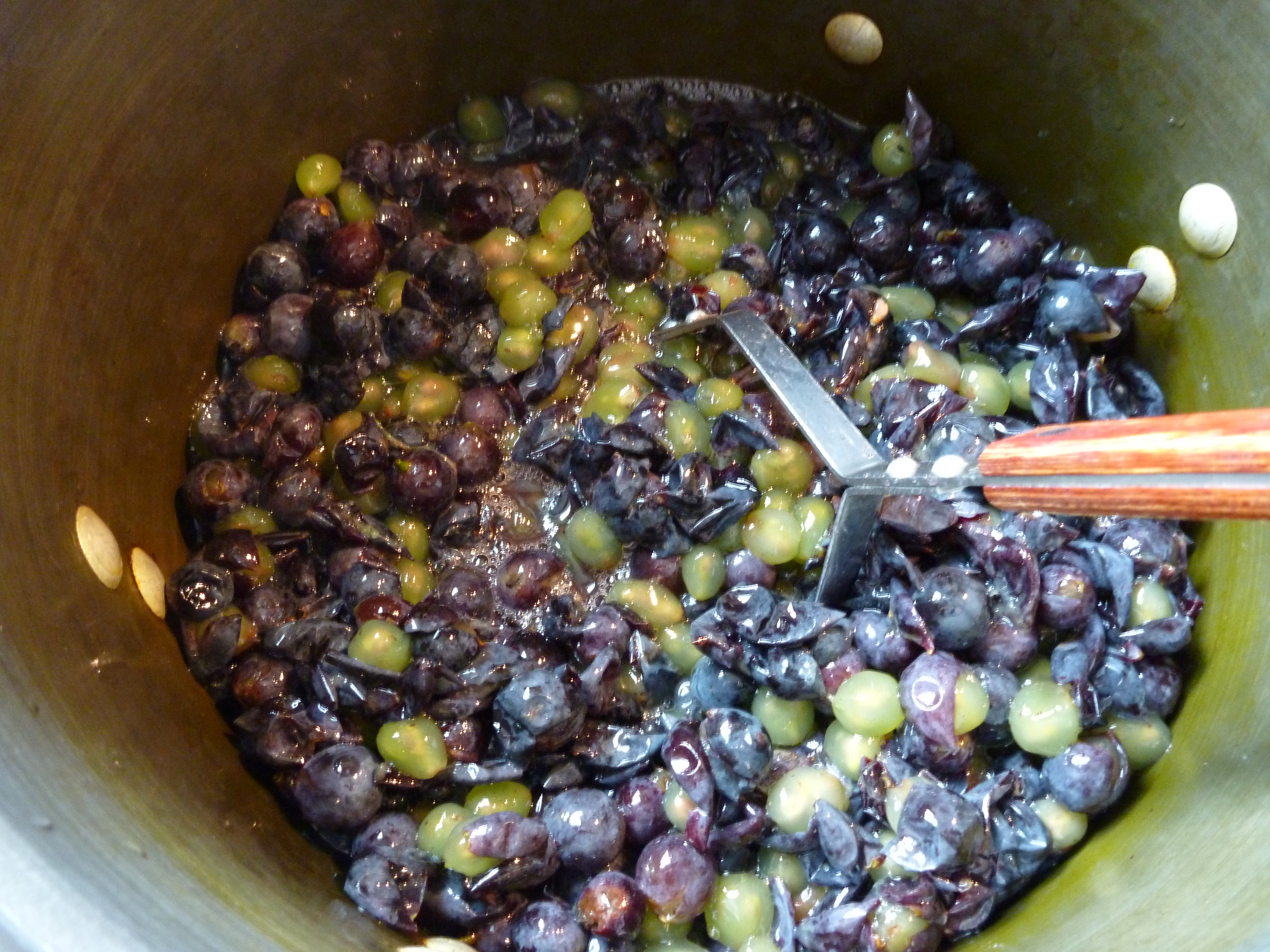
Like Concord (pictured), Termarina rossa has been historically used in jam and syrup production.

Ampelographers believe that Termarina rossa is native to the Emilia-Romagna region and today this is where most of the vine's plantings can be found, particularly in the provinces of Parma and Reggio Emilia. Though the grape has a history in the region dating back to the 1840s, it was historically used mostly for jam and syrup production and so wasn't officially added to official register of Italian wine grape varieties until 2007.

== Styles ==
According to Master of Wine Jancis Robinson, Termarina rossa has the potential to make full-bodied red wines with aroma notes of cherries and tar as well as noticeable acidity levels and smooth tannins with a slightly bitter edge.

== Synonyms ==
Over the years, Termarina rossa has been known under a variety of synonyms including: Oltremarina, Tramarina, Uva di Corinto, Uva Passarina and Uva Passerina.
