= Parthenocarpy =

Production of seedless fruit without fertilisation

In botany and horticulture, parthenocarpy is the natural or artificially induced production of fruit without fertilisation of ovules, which makes the fruit seedless. The phenomenon has been observed since ancient times but was first scientifically described by German botanist Fritz Noll in 1902.

Parthenocarpy (or stenospermocarpy) occasionally occurs as a mutation in nature; if it affects every flower, the plant can no longer sexually reproduce but might be able to propagate by apomixis or by vegetative means. Examples of this include many citrus varieties that undergo nucellar embryony for reproduction, instead of solely sexual reproduction, and can yield seedless fruits.

Stenospermocarpy may also produce apparently seedless fruit, such as "seedless watermelon", but the seeds in stenospermocarpy are actually aborted while they are still small.

== Ecological importance ==
Parthenocarpy of some fruits on a plant may be of value. Up to 20% of the fruits of wild parsnip are parthenocarpic. The seedless wild parsnip fruit are preferred by certain herbivores and so serve as a "decoy defense" against seed predation. Utah juniper has a similar defense against bird feeding. The ability to produce seedless fruit when pollination is unsuccessful may be an advantage to a plant because it provides food for the plant's seed dispersers. Without a fruit crop, the seed dispersing animals may starve or migrate.

In some plants, pollination or another stimulation is required for parthenocarpy, termed stimulative parthenocarpy. Plants that do not require pollination or other stimulation to produce parthenocarpic fruit have vegetative parthenocarpy. Seedless cucumbers are an example of vegetative parthenocarpy, seedless watermelon is an example of stenospermocarpy as they are immature seeds (aborted ones).

Plants that moved from one area of the world to another may not always be accompanied by their pollinating partner, and the lack of pollinators has spurred human cultivation of parthenocarpic varieties.

== Commercial importance ==
Seedlessness is seen as a desirable trait in edible fruit with hard seeds such as banana, pineapple, orange and grapefruit. Parthenocarpy is also desirable in fruit crops that may be difficult to pollinate or fertilize, such as fig, tomato and summer squash. In dioecious species, such as persimmon, parthenocarpy increases fruit production because staminate trees do not need to be planted to provide pollen. Parthenocarpy is undesirable in nut crops, such as pistachio, for which the seed is the edible part.

Horticulturists have selected and propagated parthenocarpic cultivars of many plants, including banana, fig, cactus pear (Opuntia), breadfruit and eggplant. Some plants, such as pineapple, produce seedless fruits when a single cultivar is grown because they are self-infertile. Some cucumbers produce seedless fruit if pollinators are excluded. Seedless watermelon plants are actually grown from seeds. The seeds are produced by crossing a diploid parent with a tetraploid parent to produce triploid seeds. It has been suggested that parthenocarpy could explain the difference in the yields in active compounds of the genus Cannabis.

In some climates, normally-seeded pear cultivars produce mainly seedless fruit for lack of pollination. Some parthenocarpic cultivars are of ancient origin. The oldest known cultivated plant is a parthenocarpic fig that was first grown at least 11,200 years ago in Jordan Valley.

When sprayed on flowers, any of the plant hormones gibberellin, auxin and cytokinin could stimulate the development of parthenocarpic fruit. That is termed artificial parthenocarpy. Plant hormones are seldom used commercially to produce parthenocarpic fruit. Home gardeners sometimes spray their tomatoes with an auxin to assure fruit production.

Some parthenocarpic cultivars have been developed as genetically modified organisms.

== Misconceptions ==
- Most commercial seedless grape cultivars, such as 'Thompson Seedless', are seedless not because of parthenocarpy but because of stenospermocarpy.
- Parthenocarpy is sometimes claimed to be the equivalent of parthenogenesis in animals. That is incorrect because parthenogenesis is a method of asexual reproduction, with embryo formation without fertilization, and parthenocarpy involves fruit formation, without seed formation. The plant equivalent of parthenogenesis is apomixis.
