= Seedless fruit =

Type of fruit

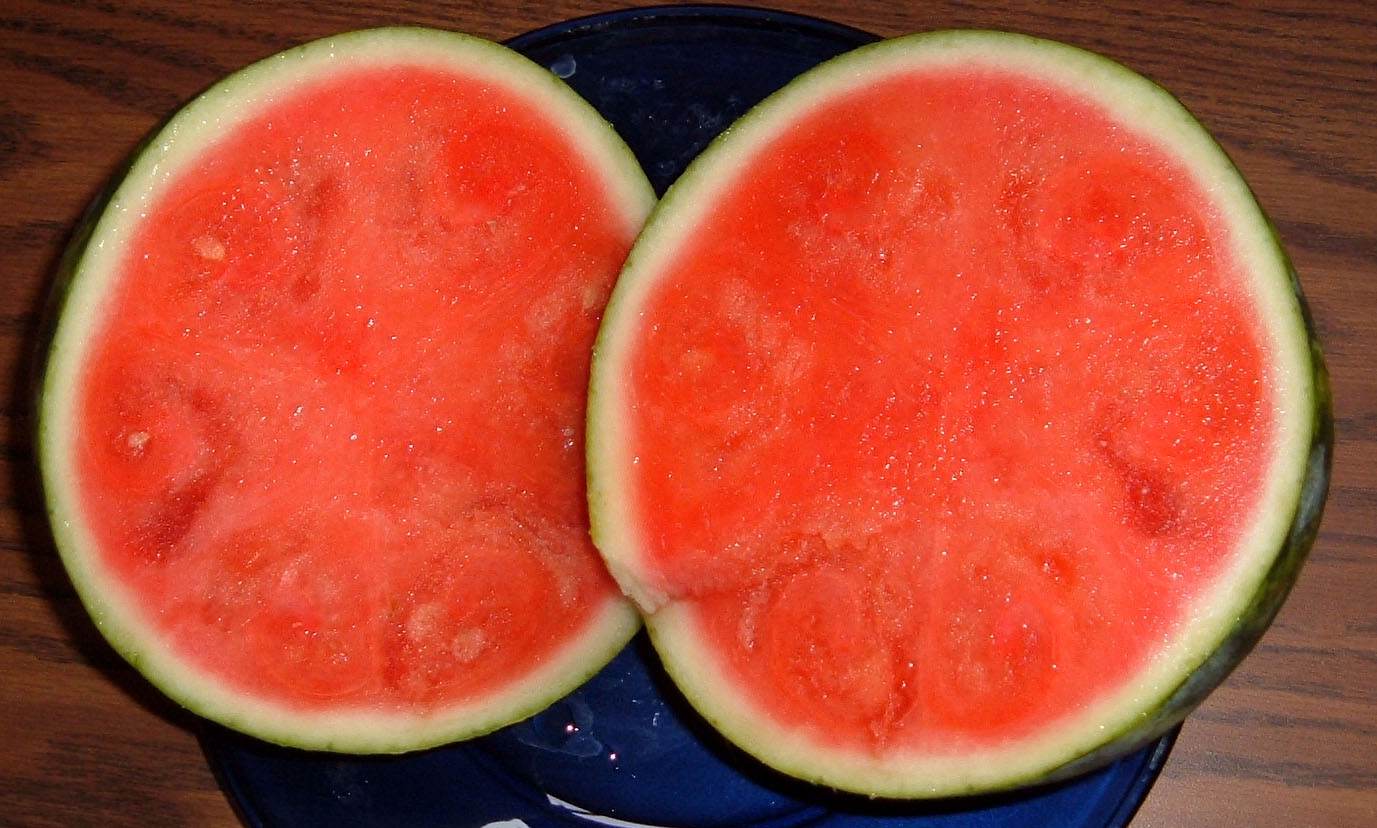
Watermelon containing only soft traces of seeds due to stenospermocarpy

A seedless or apyrenic fruit is a fruit developed to possess no mature seeds. Since eating seedless fruits is generally easier and more convenient, they are considered commercially valuable.

Most commercially produced seedless fruits have been developed from plants whose fruits normally contain numerous relatively large hard seeds distributed throughout the flesh of the fruit.

== Varieties ==
Common varieties of seedless fruits include watermelons, tomatoes, and grapes (such as Termarina rossa). Additionally, there are numerous seedless citrus fruits, such as oranges, lemons and limes.

A recent development over the last twenty years has been that of seedless sweet peppers (Capsicum annuum). The seedless plant combines male sterility in the pepper plant (commonly occurring) with the ability to set seedless fruits (a natural fruit-setting without fertilization). In male sterile plants, the parthenocarpy expresses itself only sporadically on the plant with deformed fruits. It has been reported that plant hormones provided by the ovary seed (such as auxins and gibberellins) promote fruit set and growth to produce seedless fruits. Initially, without seeds in the fruit, vegetative propagation was essential. However, now – as with seedless watermelon – seedless peppers can be grown from seeds.

== Biological description ==
Seedless fruits can develop in one of two ways: either the fruit develops without fertilization (parthenocarpy), or pollination triggers fruit development, but the ovules or embryos abort without producing mature seeds (stenospermocarpy). Seedless banana and watermelon fruits are produced on triploid plants, whose three sets of chromosomes make it very unlikely for meiosis to successfully produce spores and gametophytes. This is because one of the three copies of each chromosome cannot pair with another appropriate chromosome before separating into daughter cells, so these extra third copies end up randomly distributed between the two daughter cells from meiosis 1, resulting in the (usually) swiftly lethal aneuploidy condition. Such plants can arise by spontaneous mutation or by hybridization between diploid and tetraploid individuals of the same or different species. Some species, such as pineapple and certain varieties of tomato and cucumber, produce fruit in which there is no seed to be found if not pollinated but will produce seeded fruit if pollination occurs.

Lacking seeds, and thus the capacity to propagate via the fruit, the plants are generally propagated vegetatively from cuttings, by grafting, or in the case of bananas, from "pups" (offsets). In such cases, the resulting plants are genetically identical clones. By contrast, seedless watermelons are grown from seeds. These seeds are produced by crossing diploid and tetraploid lines of watermelon, with the resulting seeds producing sterile triploid plants. Fruit development is triggered by pollination, so these plants must be grown alongside a diploid strain to provide pollen. Triploid plants with seedless fruits can also be produced using endosperm culture for the regeneration of triploid plantlets from endosperm tissue via somatic embryogenesis.

The term "seedless fruit" is biologically somewhat contradictory, since fruits are usually defined botanically as mature ovaries containing seeds.

== Disadvantages ==
A disadvantage of most seedless crops is a significant reduction in the genetic diversity of the species. Because the plants are genetically identical clones, a pest or disease that affects one individual is likely capable of affecting each of its clones. For example, the vast majority of commercially produced bananas are cloned from a single source, the Cavendish cultivar, and are vulnerable to the fungal disease known as Panama disease.
