= List of countries by fruit production =

This is a list of countries by fruit production in 2020 based on the Food and Agriculture Organization Corporate Statistical Database. The total world fruit production for 2020 was 887,027,376 metric tonnes.

In 1961 production was 200 million tonnes.

== Production by country ==
The table shows the countries with the largest production of fruit (apricot, olive, pear, banana, mango, guava, coconut, fig, grapes, orange, papaya, peach, apple, pineapple, gooseberry, lemon, lime, raspberry, plum, strawberry, blueberry, kiwifruit, date, cherry, avocado, tomato, quince, watermelon).

Rank	Country/Region	Fruit production (tonnes)
1	China	242,793,824
2	India	105,971,127
3	Brazil	39,758,842
4	Turkey	24,153,128
5	Mexico	23,837,562
6	United States	23,747,765
7	Indonesia	22,743,965
8	Spain	19,471,070
9	Iran	18,963,596
10	Italy	17,827,510
11	Philippines	16,482,063
12	Egypt	14,733,617
13	Nigeria	11,529,922
14	Vietnam	10,616,559
15	Colombia	10,521,546
16	Thailand	10,098,175
17	Pakistan	9,825,573
18	France	8,887,220
19	Ecuador	7,630,370
20	South Africa	7,456,699
21	Argentina	7,441,342
22	Uganda	7,457,778
23	Peru	7,375,819
24	Algeria	7,055,092
25	Guatemala	6,898,708
26	Chile	6,779,886
27	Democratic Republic of the Congo	6,747,921
28	Cameroon	6,410,141
29	Ghana	6,350,716
30	Costa Rica	6,190,882
31	Russia	5,906,985
32	Uzbekistan	5,824,616
33	Dominican Republic	5,670,664
34	Tanzania	5,664,181
35	Morocco	5,586,937
36	Angola	5,174,650
37	Bangladesh	5,027,255
1,000,000–5,000,000 tonnes
38	Poland	4,499,680
39	Greece	4,436,280
40	Kenya	4,373,793
41	Malawi	3,713,852
42	Venezuela	3,558,935
43	Australia	3,539,850
44	Afghanistan	3,459,051
45	Sudan	3,263,482
46	Romania	2,953,850
47	Japan	2,929,692
48	Saudi Arabia	2,913,925
49	Ivory Coast	2,891,070
50	Kazakhstan	2,863,721
51	South Korea	2,765,000
52	Myanmar	2,732,463
53	Ukraine	2,688,105
54	Taiwan	2,653,885
55	Germany	2,501,450
56	Papua New Guinea	2,467,868
57	Syria	2,449,998
58	Tunisia	2,389,063
59	Mali	2,350,297
60	Rwanda	2,176,865
61	Iraq	2,160,646
62	Portugal	2,009,626
63	Senegal	2,008,315
64	Serbia	1,909,656
65	North Korea	1,823,821
66	New Zealand	1,780,310
67	Burundi	1,723,465
68	Cuba	1,697,454
69	Azerbaijan	1,685,881
70	Ethiopia	1,558,021
71	Honduras	1,548,940
72	Bolivia	1,540,081
73	Nepal	1,503,925
74	Israel	1,419,730
75	Tajikistan	1,342,138
76	Sri Lanka	1,339,584
77	Guinea	1,317,847
78	Madagascar	1,259,165
79	Yemen	1,173,553
80	Haiti	1,169,114
81	Hungary	1,164,360
82	Laos	1,146,352
83	Moldova	1,141,221
84	Mozambique	1,138,328
85	Malaysia	1,113,002
86	Lebanon	1,036,334
100,000–1,000,000 tonnes
87	Canada	925,776
88	Albania	818,946
89	Paraguay	776,987
90	Belarus	776,183
91	Netherlands	738,770
92	United Kingdom	738,454
93	Austria	699,860
94	Libya	685,416
95	Turkmenistan	683,563
96	Armenia	680,216
97	Panama	644,813
98	Niger	636,912
99	North Macedonia	635,961
100	Georgia	633,400
101	Benin	627,319
102	Belgium	615,930
103	Nicaragua	581,833
104	Jordan	558,727
105	South Sudan	553,035
106	Oman	505,249
107	Bulgaria	464,940
108	Kyrgyzstan	457,024
109	Bosnia and Herzegovina	432,324
110	Uruguay	395,578
111	Gabon	387,085
112	Jamaica	373,962
113	Switzerland	373,177
114	Cambodia	372,535
115	United Arab Emirates	361,471
116	Zimbabwe	358,622
117	Guyana	327,946
118	El Salvador	316,695
119	Central African Republic	310,775
120	Croatia	281,670
121	Republic of the Congo	269,986
122	Sierra Leone	269,722
123	Czech Republic	233,610
124	Liberia	205,631
125	Somalia	214,348
126	Belize	211,576
127	Puerto Rico	208,542
128	Slovenia	186,100
129	Eswatini	146,442
130	Cyprus	126,480
131	Chad	125,896
132	Kuwait	124,522
133	Zambia	116,340
134	Palestine	109,350
135	Guinea-Bissau	109,077
136	Burkina Faso	104,416
10,000–100,000 tonnes
137	Suriname	97,803
138	Slovakia	85,120
139	Saint Vincent and the Grenadines	77,252
140	Trinidad and Tobago	74,453
141	Montenegro	73,505
142	Equatorial Guinea	70,299
143	Lithuania	68,580
144	Togo	66,823
145	Namibia	61,891
146	Denmark	58,060
147	Bhutan	56,475
148	Dominica	51,623
149	São Tomé and Príncipe	50,601
150	Comoros	50,526
151	Sweden	49,440
152	Bahamas	48,413
153	Samoa	46,538
154	Fiji	40,895
155	Botswana	32,152
156	Solomon Islands	30,094
157	Mauritania	29,055
158	Qatar	29,144
159	Ireland	26,150
160	Finland	25,550
161	Mauritius	24,434
162	Norway	23,836
163	Vanuatu	22,290
164	Saint Kitts and Nevis	21,821
165	Bahrain	21,284
166	Latvia	19,500
167	Grenada	19,111
168	French Polynesia	17,218
169	Timor-Leste	17,218
170	Luxembourg	16,040
171	Lesotho	15,350
172	New Caledonia	12,552
173	Malta	10,900
1,000–10,000 tonnes
174	Gambia	9,503
175	Kiribati	9,024
176	Antigua and Barbuda	8,726
177	Tonga	8,611
178	Cape Verde	8,366
179	Brunei	8,133
180	Maldives	6,144
181	Barbados	5,146
182	Hong Kong	5,088
183	Djibouti	4,873
184	Eritrea	4,853
185	Estonia	4,190
186	Seychelles	2,964
187	Federated States of Micronesia	2,628
188	Saint Kitts and Nevis	1,990
189	Mongolia	1,600
190	Cook Islands	1,269
<1,000 tonnes
191	Niue	906
192	Tuvalu	869
193	Nauru	474
194	Tokelau	76
195	Singapore	5

== World production ==
World production in tonnes.

Year	Production
1961	199,837,692
1962	216,844,165
1963	213,981,496
1964	224,684,963
1965	229,599,213
1966	235,587,199
1967	247,171,159
1968	253,752,302
1969	258,907,559
1970	266,240,229

Year	Production
1971	271,334,366
1972	267,374,991
1973	290,182,933
1974	290,964,737
1975	297,803,608
1976	305,283,190
1977	300,015,719
1978	311,405,723
1979	332,436,614
1980	338,769,388

Year	Production
1981	334,711,419
1982	358,793,341
1983	357,696,957
1984	358,649,274
1985	367,907,480
1986	387,668,790
1987	392,860,382
1988	393,707,626
1989	401,763,150
1990	401,594,032

Year	Production
1991	401,609,695
1992	432,454,938
1993	443,137,612
1994	449,111,803
1995	466,876,272
1996	492,023,497
1997	519,316,923
1998	519,577,253
1999	555,119,417
2000	571,913,099

Year	Production
2001	582,653,919
2002	600,740,188
2003	613,631,398
2004	637,042,916
2005	652,244,756
2006	676,908,628
2007	684,796,464
2008	702,113,436
2009	720,500,199
2010	735,617,934

Year	Production
2011	760,599,594
2012	773,991,079
2013	805,545,390
2014	822,274,150
2015	835,388,478
2016	836,104,407
2017	842,790,723
2018	865,875,139
2019	882,160,185
2020	887,027,376
