= Stenospermocarpy =

Biological mechanism

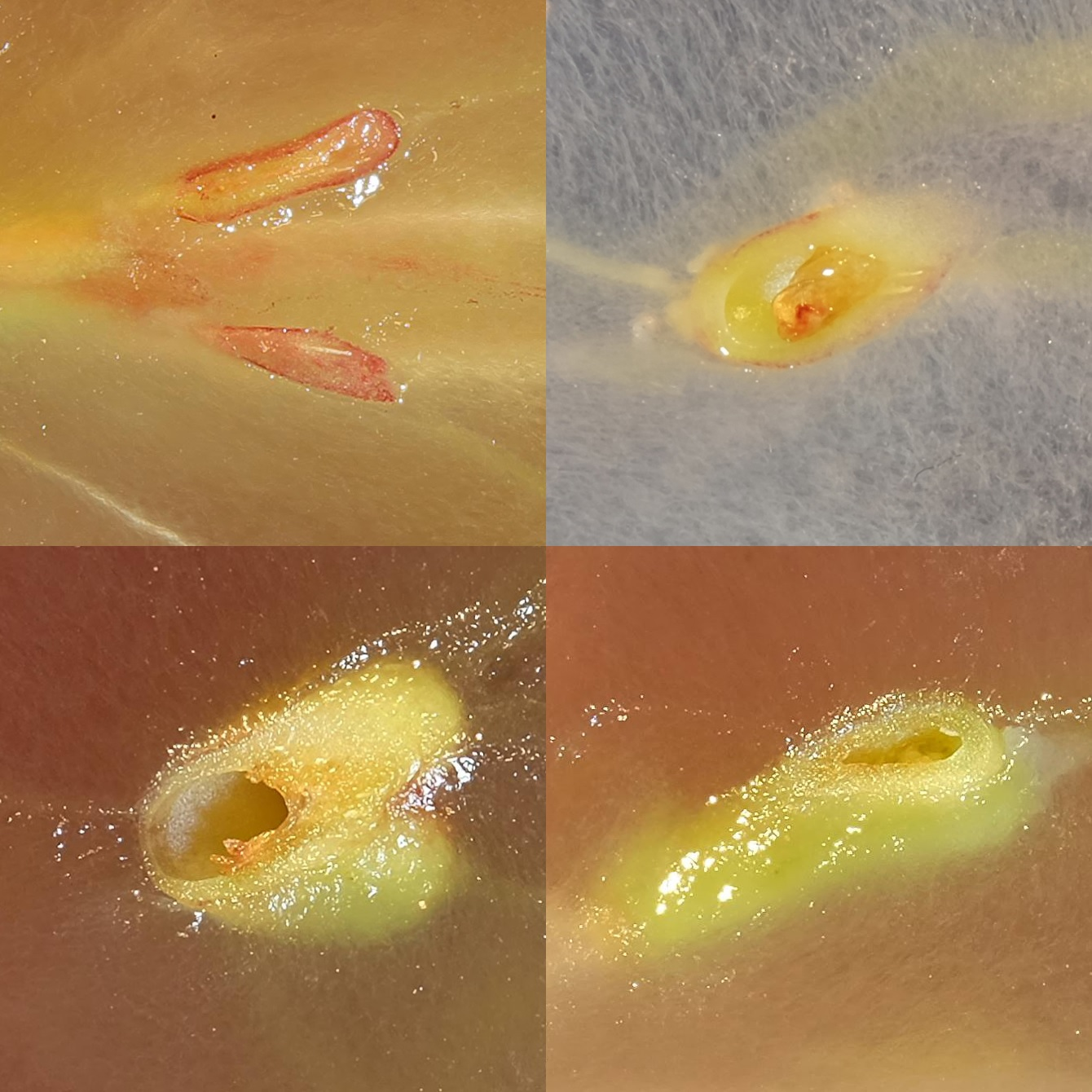
Undeveloped seeds in 'Crimson Seedless' grapes

Stenospermocarpy is the biological mechanism that produces parthenocarpy (seedlessness) in some fruits, notably many table grapes.

In stenospermocarpic fruits, normal pollination and fertilization are still required to ensure that the fruit 'sets', i.e. continues to develop on the plant; however subsequent abortion of the embryo that began growing following fertilization leads to a near seedless condition. The remains of the undeveloped seed are visible in the fruit.

Most commercial seedless grapes are sprayed with gibberellin to increase the size of the fruit and also to make the fruit clusters less tightly packed. A new cultivar, 'Melissa', has naturally larger fruit so does not require gibberellin sprays.

Grape breeders have developed some new seedless grape cultivars by using the embryo rescue technique. Before the tiny embryo aborts, it is removed from the developing fruit and grown in tissue culture until it is large enough to survive on its own. Embryo rescue allows the crossing of two seedless grape cultivars.

There are two types of seedlessness in grapes: true seedlessness of parthenocarpic berries when only ovules may develop and commercial seedlessness of stenospermocarpic berries when aborted seeds go unnoticed when chewing. Stenospermocarpic seeds vary significantly in size and in the degree of development of the seed coat and the endosperm. Larger seeds of stenospermocarpic grapes are referred to as rudimentary seeds and smaller ones as seed traces.

== Seedless grape cultivars ==
Seedless grapes are divided into white, red and black types based roughly on fruit color. The most popular seedless grape is known in the United States as 'Thompson Seedless', but was originally known as 'Sultana'. It is believed to be of ancient origin. It is considered a white grape, but is actually a pale green. Other white cultivars are 'Perlette', 'Menindee Seedless', 'Interlaken', 'Himrod', 'Romulanus', 'Lakemont', 'Fayez', and 'Remaily Seedless.' The most popular red seedless in the U.S. is 'Flame Seedless'. Other red cultivars are 'Crimson Seedless', 'Ruby Seedless', 'Suffolk Red', 'Saturn' and 'Pink Reliance'. Some black cultivars are 'Black Beauty', 'Black Monukka', 'Concord Seedless', 'Glenora' and 'Thomcord.'

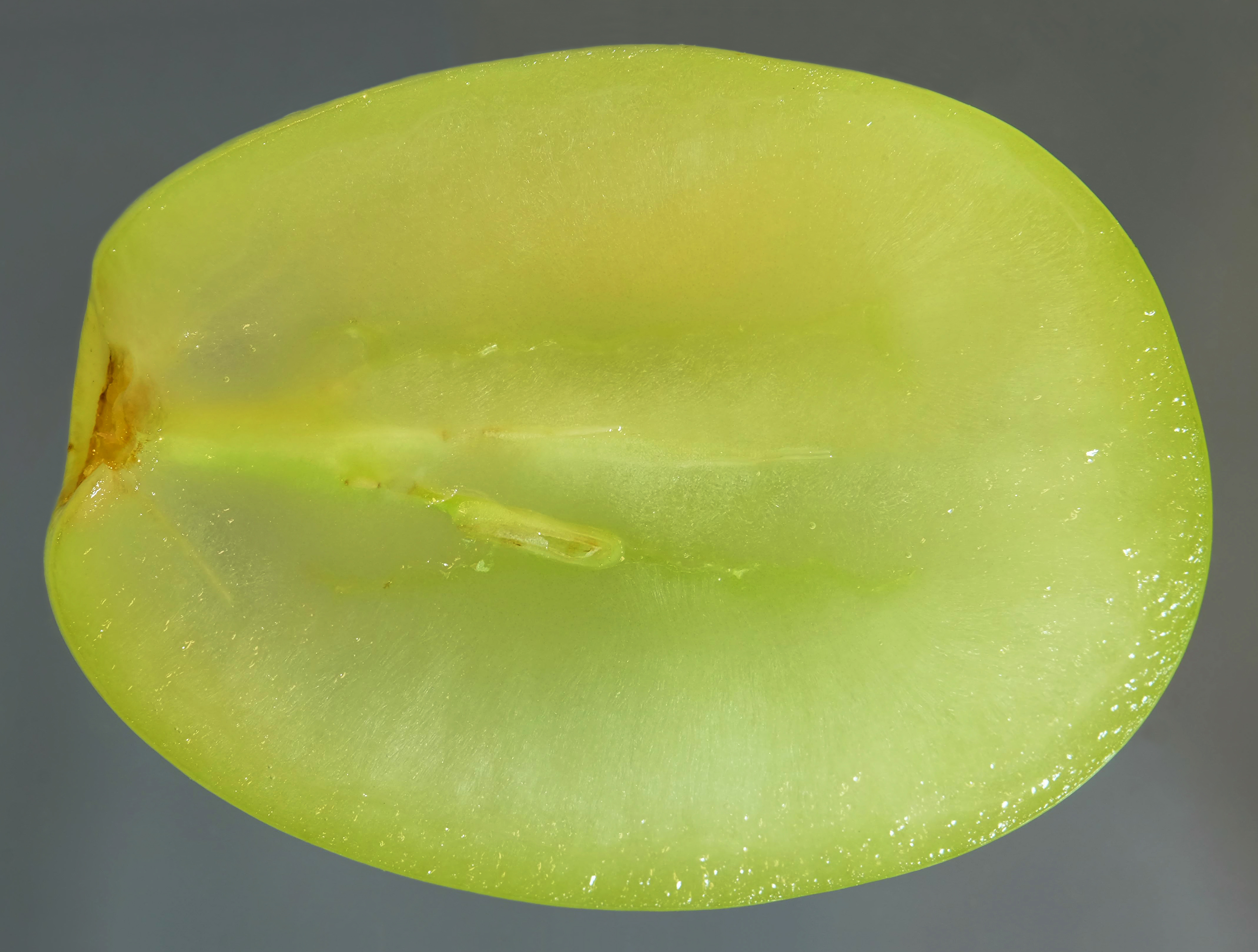
Thompson Seedless

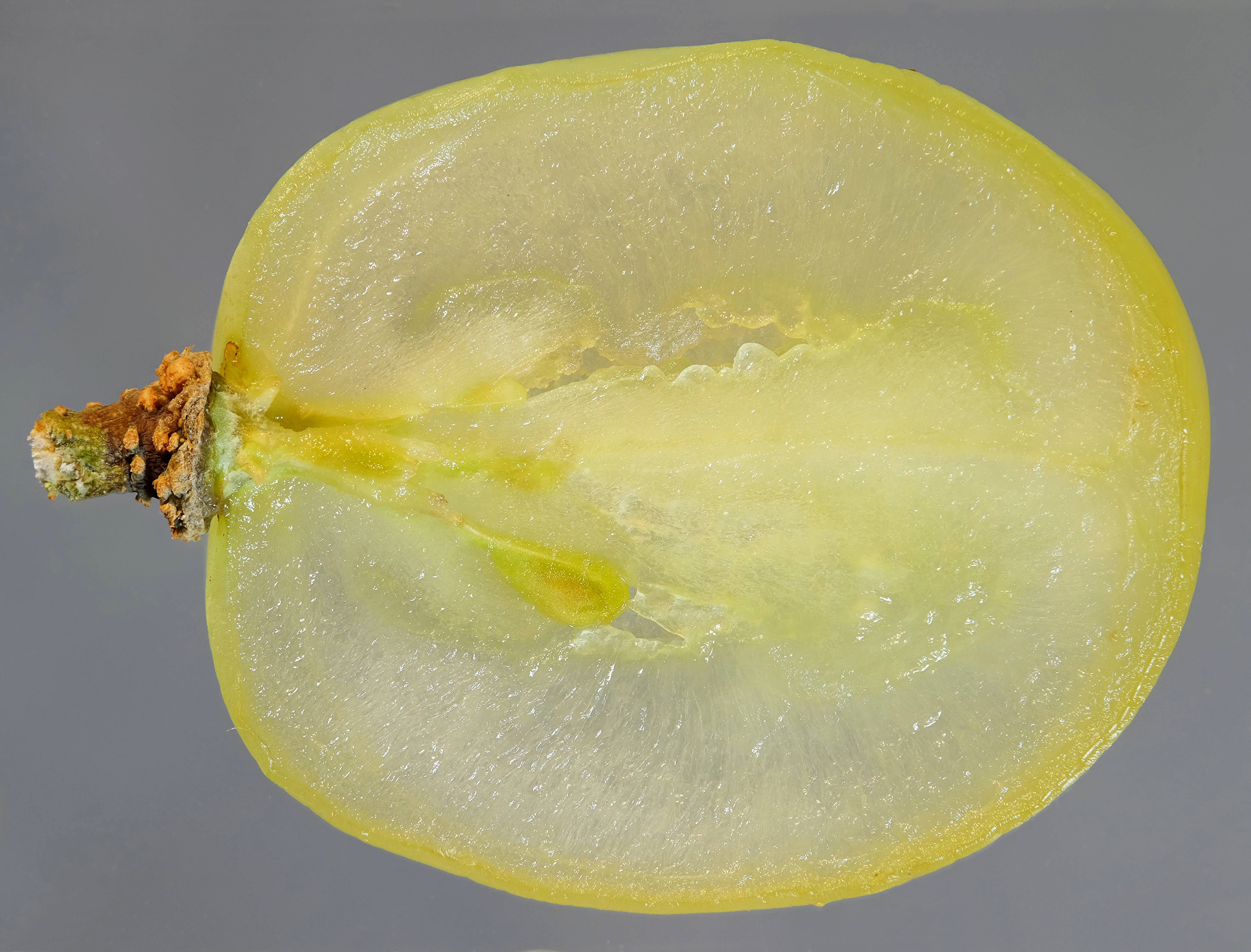
Sheegene 21

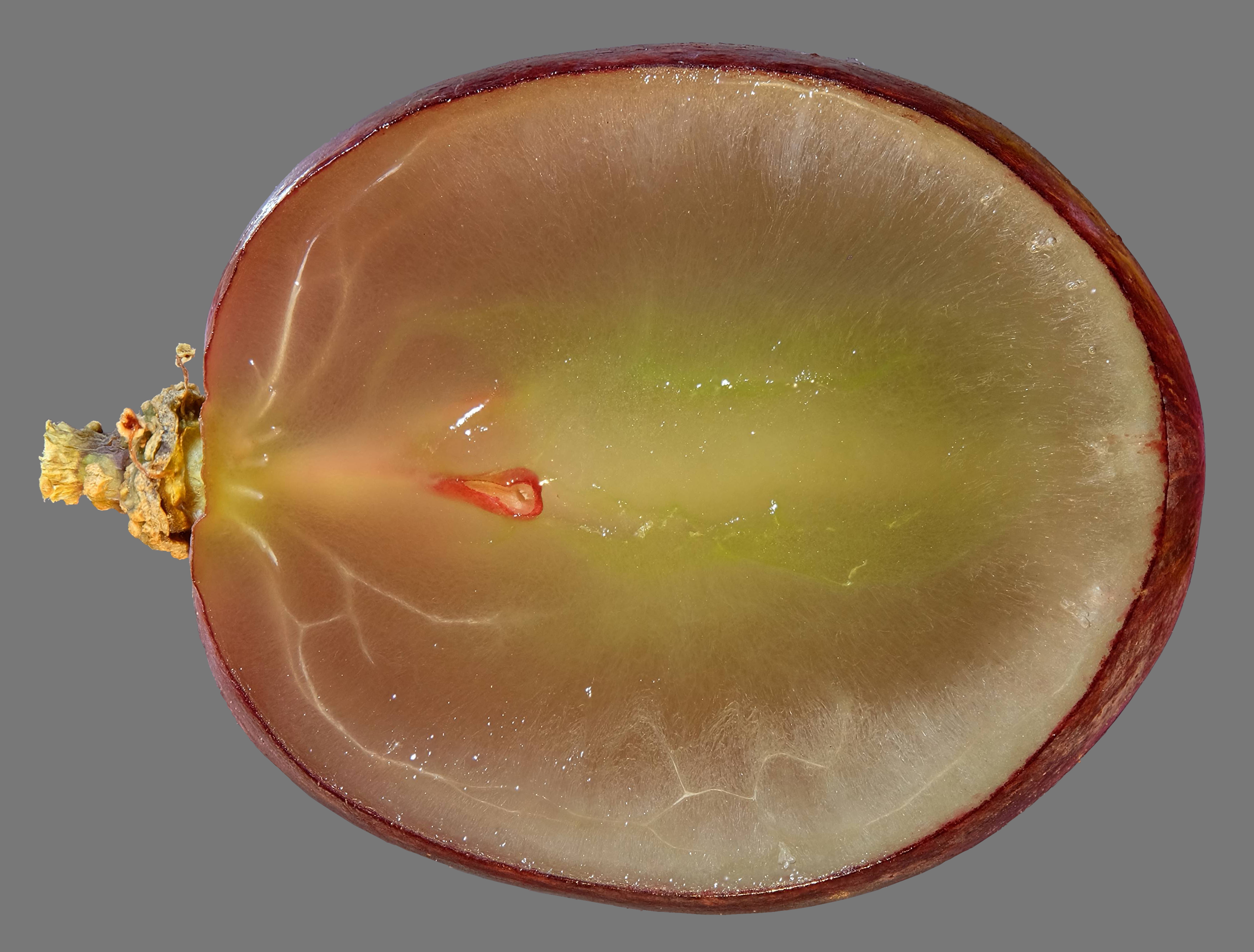
Crimson Seedless

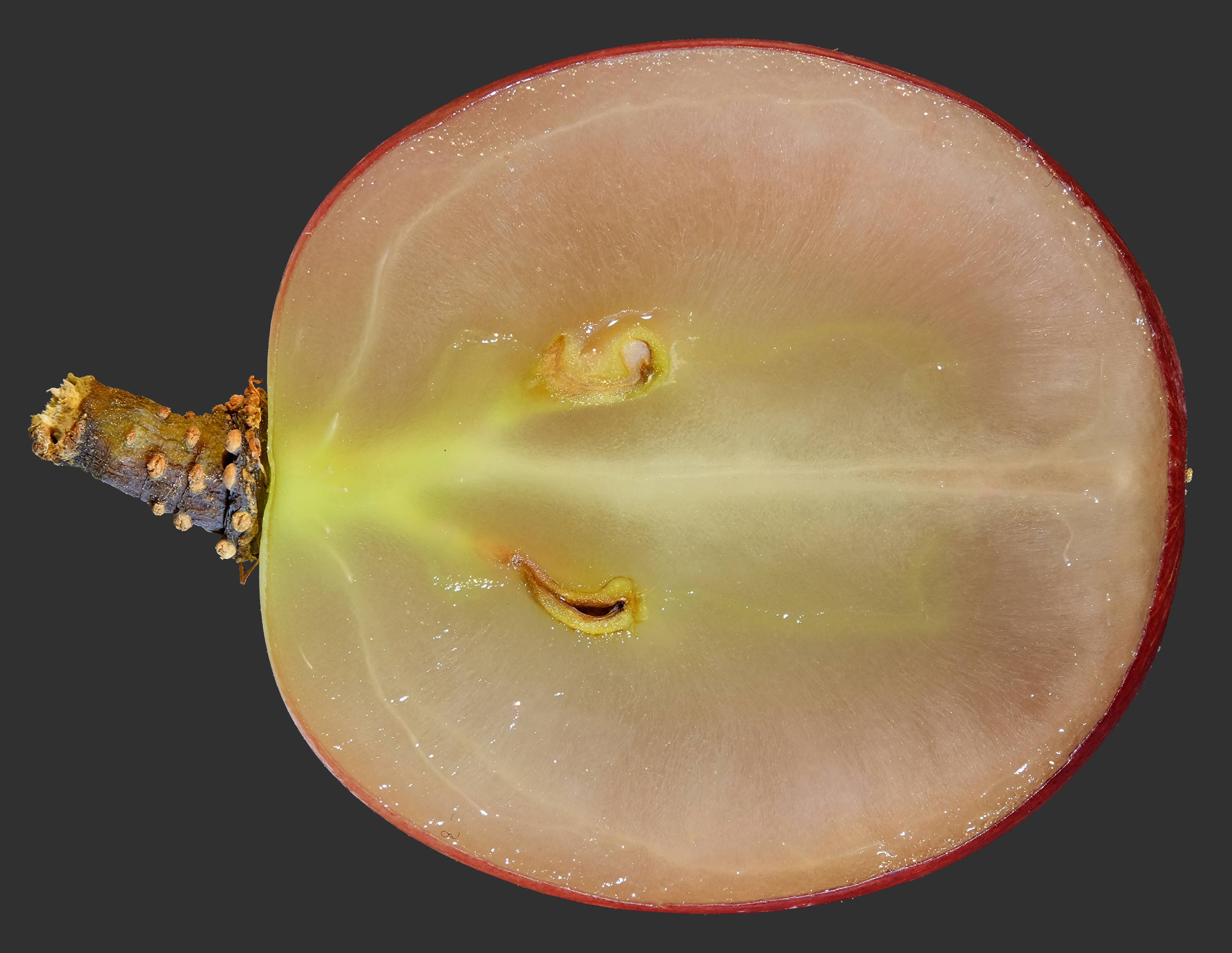
IFG Three

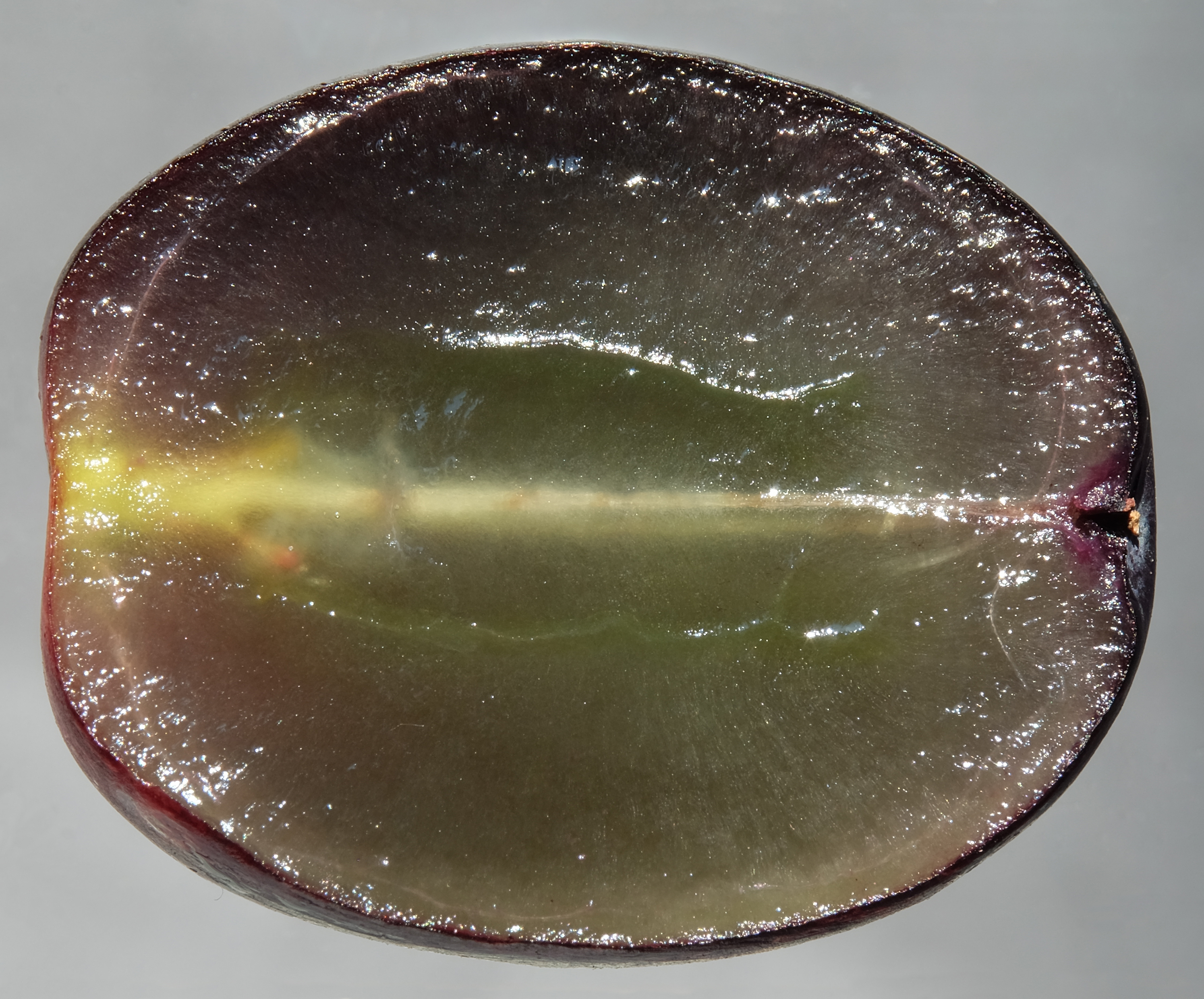
A red seedless

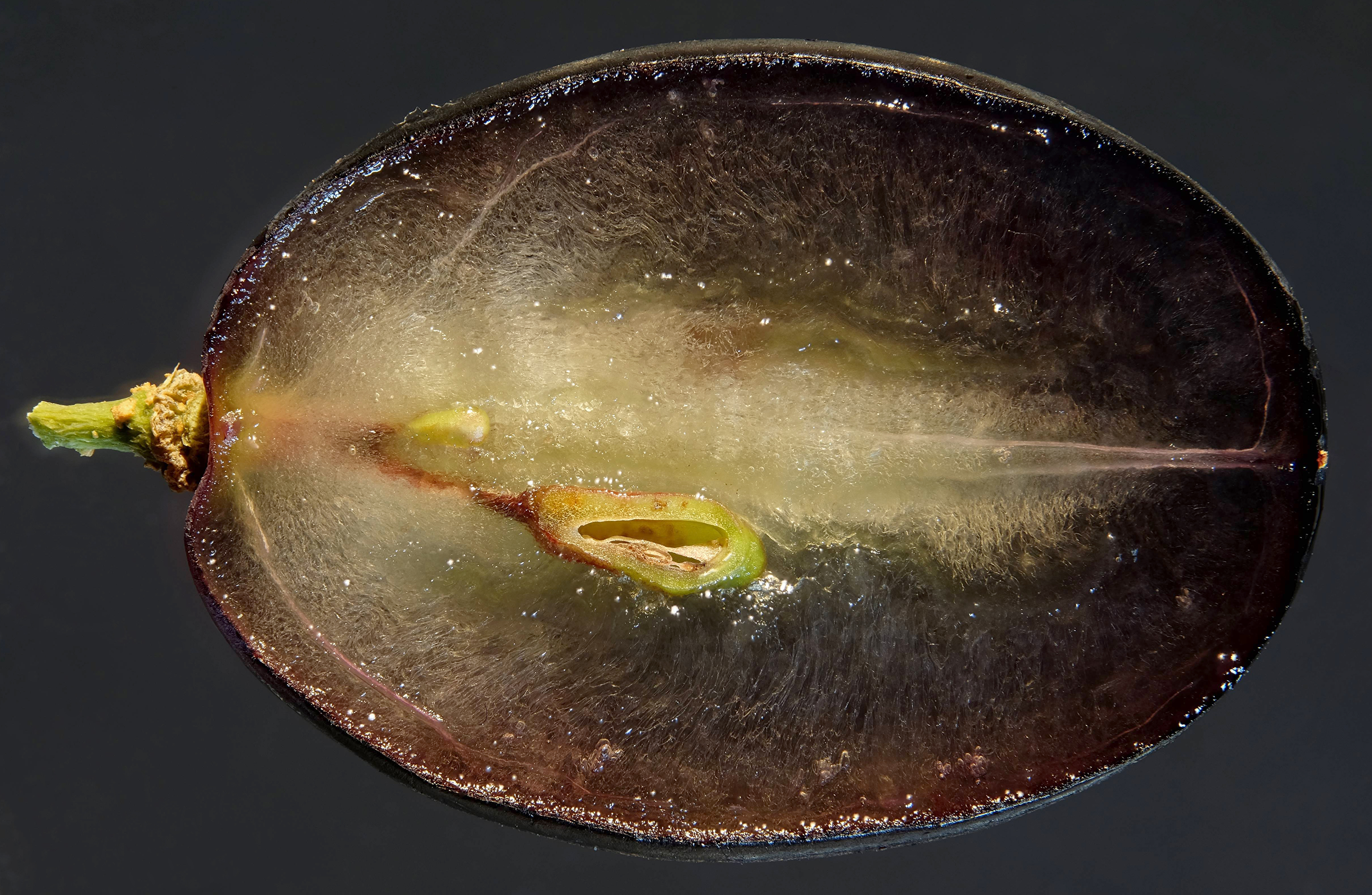
IFG Seventeen

== See also ==
- List of grape varieties
- Seedless fruit
