= Triphasia brassii =

Scientific classification
- Kingdom: Plantae
- Clade: Tracheophytes
- Clade: Angiosperms
- Clade: Eudicots
- Clade: Rosids
- Order: Sapindales
- Family: Rutaceae
- Genus: Triphasia
- Species: T. brassii

Binomial name
- Triphasia brassii (Swingle) Swingle

Species of fruit and plant

Triphasia brassii is a rare species of Triphasia in the family Rutaceae, native to New Guinea.

All known specimens are from one general area. Triphasias are very close relatives of citrus.

== Description ==
It is a very spiny evergreen shrub (rarely a small tree) growing to 2 m (6.5 ft) tall. The leaves are glossy dark green, each leaflet 2–4 cm (3/4 to 1 1/2 in) long and 1.5–2 cm (3/4 to 1 in) wide. The flowers are white and strongly scented. The kumquat-sized fruit is a red, edible hesperidium resembling a small Citrus fruit. The fruit is larger than the somewhat better known limeberry. The fruit flesh is pulpy, with a flavor reminiscent of a slightly sweet lime.

== Cultivation and uses ==
Like its close relative the limeberry, T. brassii may have some unexplored potential as a fruit crop. Thus far, however, this potential has been limited due to the absence of domesticated variants, the lack of close scientific study, and the extreme rarity of the plant.
