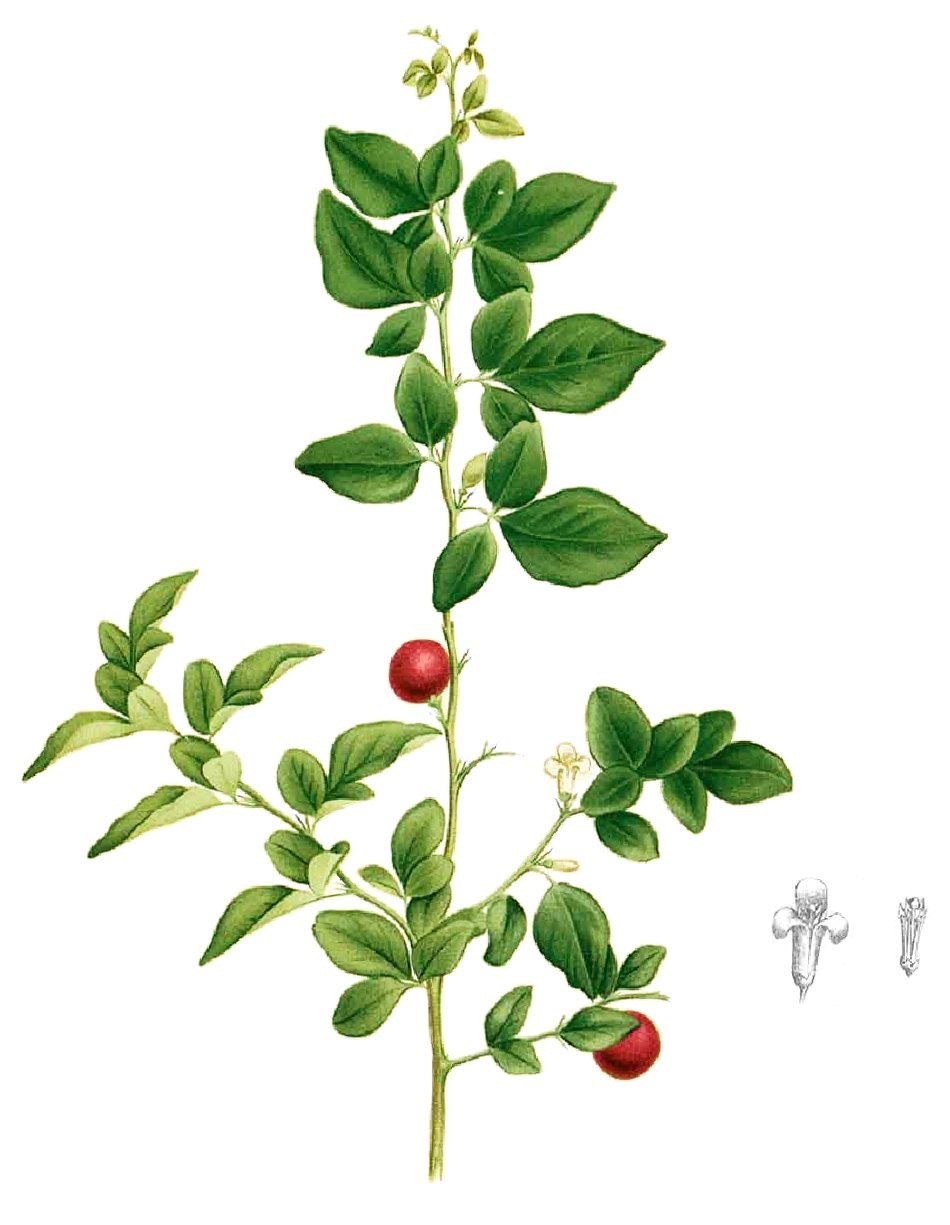
- Triphasia trifolia foliage and fruit

Scientific classification
- Kingdom: Plantae
- Clade: Tracheophytes
- Clade: Angiosperms
- Clade: Eudicots
- Clade: Rosids
- Order: Sapindales
- Family: Rutaceae
- Subfamily: Aurantioideae
- Genus: Triphasia; Lour.

Species
- See text.

Synonyms
- Echinocitrus Tanaka

= Triphasia =

Genus of flowering plants

Triphasia is a small genus of flowering plants, comprising three species, in the family Rutaceae. The genus is related to Citrus and is native to southeastern Asia and New Guinea.

They are evergreen shrubs growing to 1–3 m tall, with trifoliate leaves. The flowers are fragrant, white, with three to five petals. The fruit is an edible red hesperidium similar to a small Citrus fruit.

Species

- Triphasia brassii (C.T.White) Swingle – New Guinea
- Triphasia grandifolia Merr. – Philippines
- Triphasia trifolia (Burm.f.) P.Wils. – Malaysia
