= Fruit (plant structure) =

Internal makeup of fruits

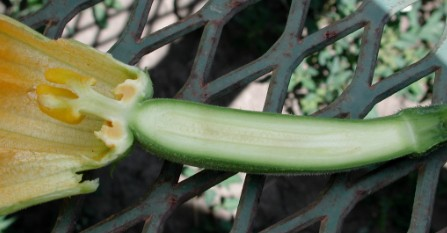
Longitudinal section of a female flower of a squash plant (courgette), showing the ovary (with ovules), style and stigmas

Fruits are the mature ovary or ovaries of one or more flowers. They are found in three main anatomical categories: aggregate fruits, multiple fruits, and simple fruits.

Fruitlike structures may develop directly from the seed itself rather than the ovary, such as a fleshy aril or sarcotesta.

The grains of grasses are single-seed simple fruits wherein the pericarp and seed coat are fused into one layer. This type of fruit is called a caryopsis. Examples include cereal grains, such as wheat, barley, oats and rice.

== Categories of fruits ==
Fruits are found in three main anatomical categories: aggregate fruits, multiple fruits, and simple fruits. Aggregate fruits are formed from a single compound flower and contain many ovaries or fruitlets. Examples include raspberries and blackberries. Multiple fruits are formed from the fused ovaries of multiple flowers or inflorescence. An example of multiple fruits are the fig, mulberry, and the pineapple. Simple fruits are formed from a single ovary and may contain one or many seeds. They can be either fleshy or dry. In fleshy fruit, during development, the pericarp and other accessory structures become the fleshy portion of the fruit. The types of fleshy fruits are berries, pomes, and drupes. In berries, the entire pericarp is fleshy but this excludes the exocarp which acts as more of a skin. There are berries that are known as pepo, a type of berry with an inseparable rind, or hesperidium, which has a separable rind. A cucumber is an example of a pepo, while a lemon is an example of a hesperidium. The fleshy portion of the pomes is developed from the floral tube and like the berry most of the pericarp is fleshy but the endocarp is cartilaginous; an apple is an example of a pome. Lastly, drupes are known for being one-seeded with a fleshy mesocarp; an example of this is the peach. However, there are fruits where the fleshy portion is developed from tissues that are not the ovary, such as in the strawberry. The edible part of the strawberry is formed from the receptacle of the flower. Due to this difference the strawberry is known as a false fruit or an accessory fruit.

There is a shared method of seed dispersal within fleshy fruits. These fruits depend on animals to eat the fruits and disperse the seeds (endozoochory) in order for their populations to survive. Dry fruits also develop from the ovary, but unlike the fleshy fruits they do not depend on the mesocarp but the endocarp for seed dispersal. Dry fruits depend more on physical forces, like wind and water. Dry fruits' seeds can also perform pod shattering, which involve the seed being ejected from the seed coat by shattering it. Some dry fruits are able to perform seed pod explosions, such as wisteria, resulting the seed to be dispersed over long distances. Like fleshy fruits, dry fruits can also depend on animals to spread their seeds by adhering to animal's fur and skin, this is known as epizoochory. Types of dry fruits include achenes, capsules, follicles or nuts. Dry fruits can also be separated into dehiscent and indehiscent fruits. Dry dehiscent fruits are described as a fruit where the pod has an increase in internal tension to allow seeds to be released. These include the sweet pea, soybean, alfalfa, milkweed, mustard, cabbage and poppy. Dry indehiscent fruit differ in that they do not have this mechanism and simply depend on physical forces. Examples of species indehiscent fruit are sunflower seeds, nuts, and dandelions.

=== Evolutionary history ===
There is a wide variety in the structures of fruit across the different species of plants. Evolution has selected for certain traits in plants that would increase their fitness. This diversity arose through the selection of advantageous methods for seed protection and dispersal in different environments. It is known that dry fruits were present before fleshy fruits and fleshy fruits diverged from them. A study looking at the family Rubiaceae found that within the family, fleshy fruits had evolved independently at least 12 times. This means that fleshy fruits were not passed on to following generations but that this form of fruit was selected for in different species. This may imply that fleshy fruit is a favorable and beneficial trait because not only does it disperse the seeds, but it also protects them. There is also a variety of dispersal methods that are used by different plants. The origins of these modes of dispersal have been found to be a more recent evolutionary change. Of the methods of dispersal, the plants that use animals have not changed in many ways from the original trait. Due to this, it may be assumed that animal dispersal is an efficient form of dispersal, however there has been no evidence that it increases dispersal distances. Therefore, the question remains of what evolutionary mechanism causes such dramatic diversity. It has been found, however, that simple changes within developmental regulatory genes can cause large alterations within the anatomical structure of the fruit. Even without knowing the mechanism involved in the biodiversity of fruit, it is clear that this diversity is important to the continuation of plant populations.

== Anatomy of simple fruits ==
Diagram of a typical drupe (in this case, a peach), showing both fruit and seed

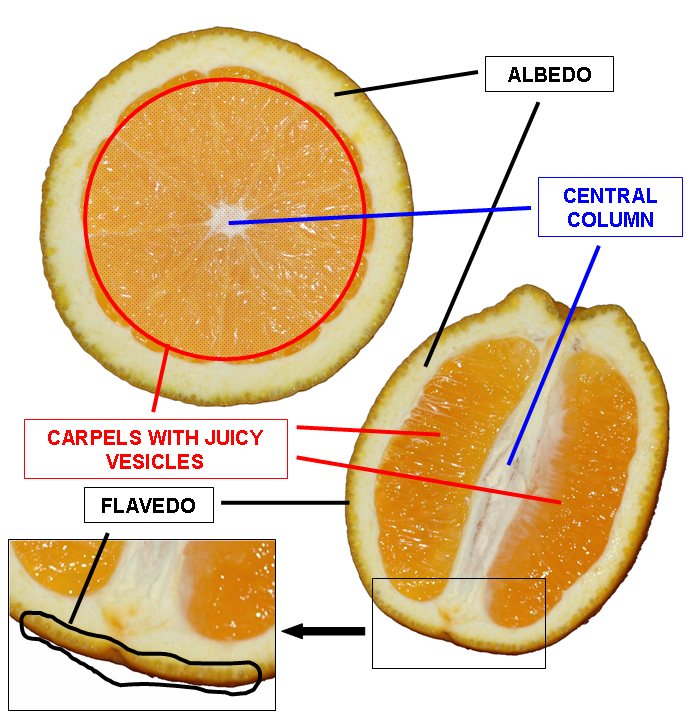
A schematic picture of an orange hesperidium

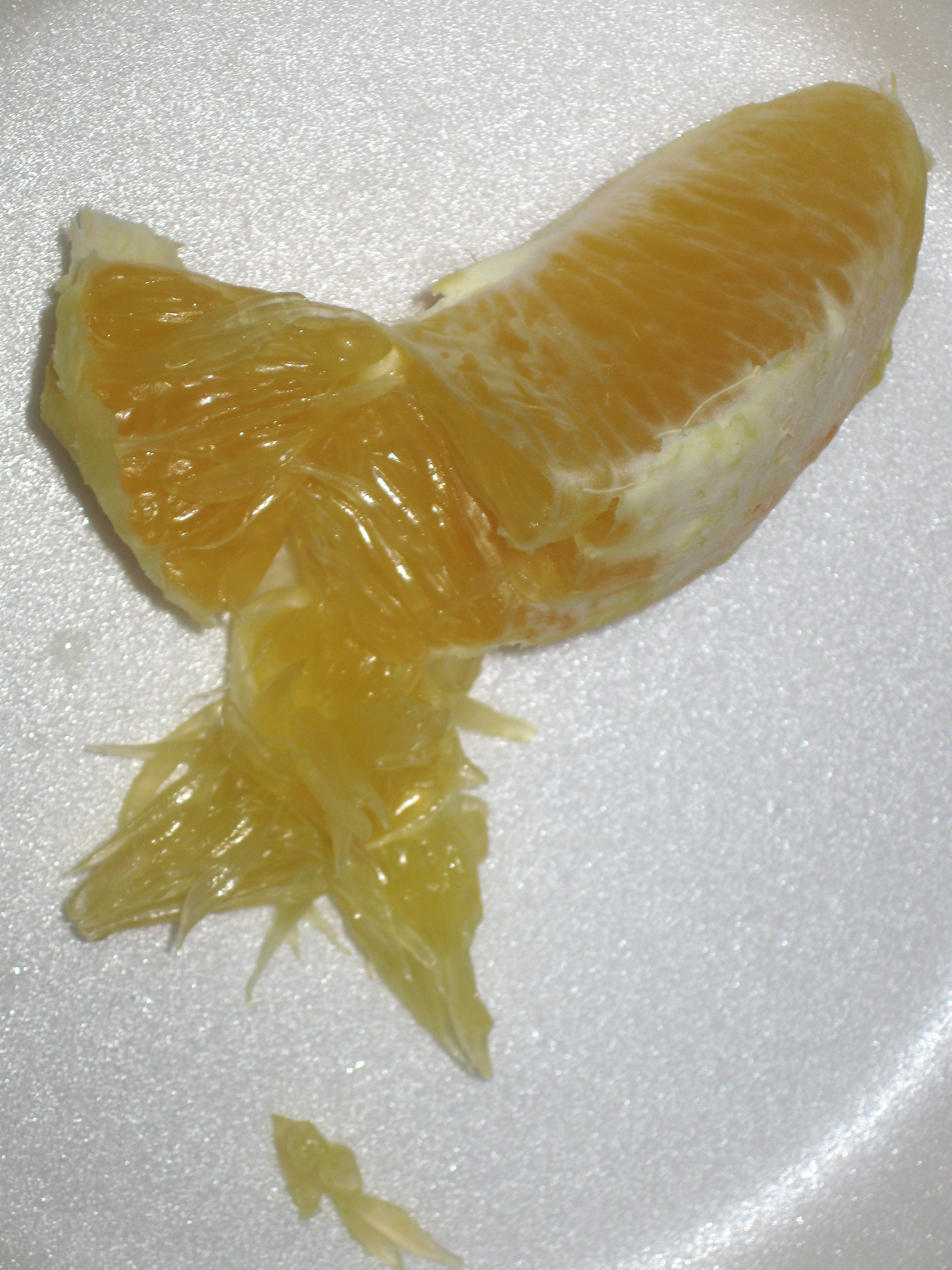
A segment of an orange that has been opened to show the pulp (juice vesicles) of the endocarp

Fruit anatomy is the plant anatomy of the internal structure of fruit. In berries and drupes, the pericarp forms the edible tissue around the seeds. In other fruits such as citrus and stone fruits (Prunus) only some layers of the pericarp are eaten. In accessory fruits, other tissues develop into the edible portion of the fruit instead, for example the receptacle of the flower in strawberries.

== Pericarp layers ==
In fleshy fruits, the pericarp is typically made up of three distinct layers: the outer epicarp, the middle mesocarp and the inner endocarp. These layers vary in thickness and texture, and may blend into each other. In a hesperidium like lemon, the epicarp and mesocarp make up the peel; in many berries like melons or cucumbers (pepo), the mesocarp and endocarp make up the flesh.

In dry fruits, the layers of the pericarp are usually hard, dry and not clearly distinguishable.

=== Epicarp ===
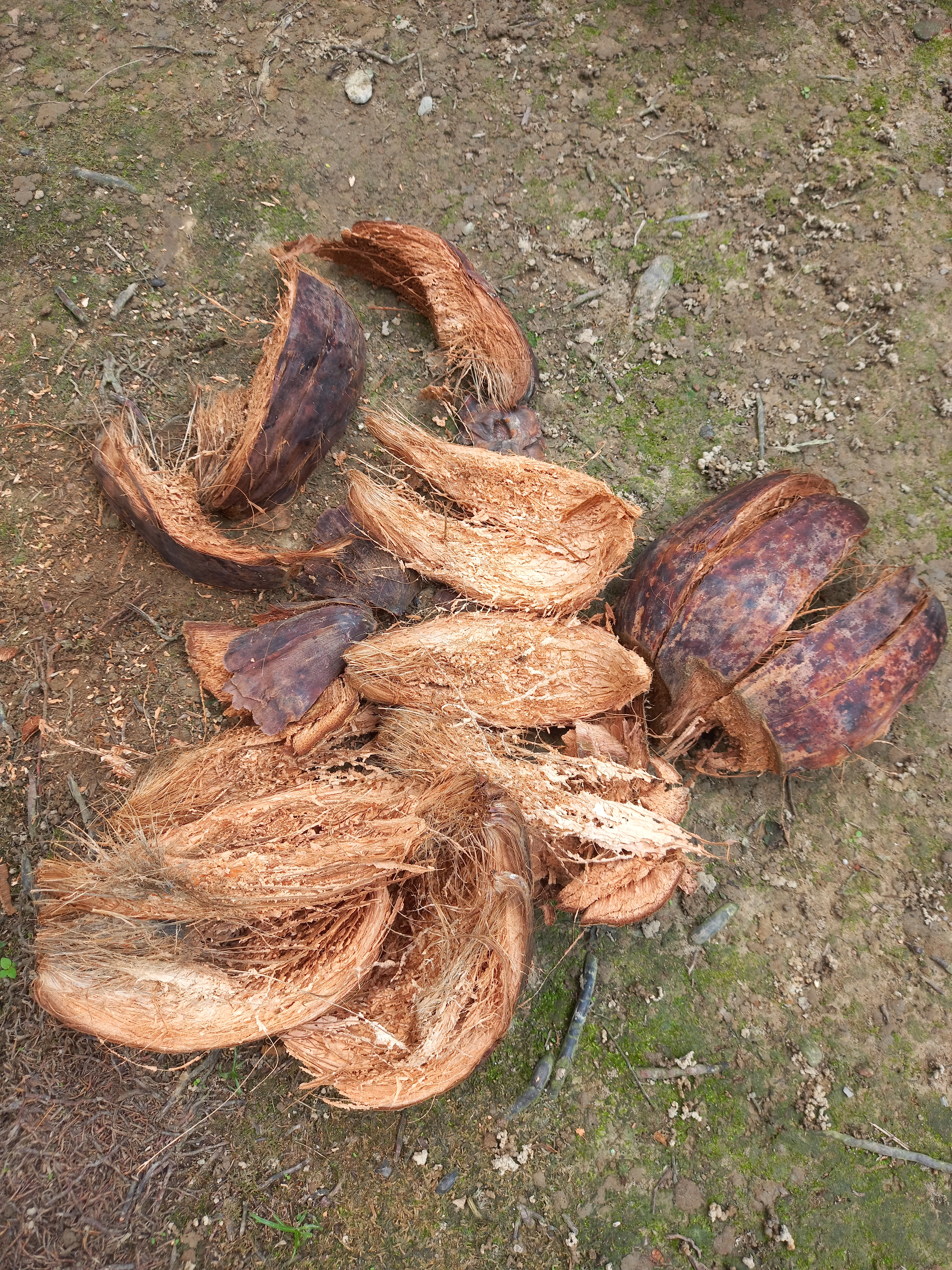
Husk of a coconut (smooth exocarp plus fibrous mesocarp)

Epicarp (from Greek: epi-, "on" or "upon" + -carp, "fruit") is a botanical term for the outermost layer of the pericarp (or fruit). The epicarp forms the tough outer skin of the fruit, if there is one. The epicarp is sometimes called the exocarp, or, especially in citrus, the flavedo (zest).

==== Flavedo ====
Flavedo is mostly composed of cellulosic material but also contains other components, such as essential oils, pigments (carotenoids, chlorophylls, flavonoids), paraffin waxes, steroids and triterpenoids, fatty acids, bitter principles (limonin), and enzymes.

In citrus fruits, the flavedo constitutes the peripheral surface of the pericarp. It is composed of several cell layers that become progressively thicker in the internal part; the epidermic layer is covered with wax and contains few stomata, which in many cases are closed when the fruit is ripe.

When ripe, the flavedo cells contain carotenoids (mostly xanthophyll) inside chromoplasts, which, in a previous developmental stage, contained chlorophyll. This hormonally controlled progression in development is responsible for the fruit's change of color from green to yellow upon ripening. Citrus flavedo may be scraped off the fruit to create zest.

The internal region of the flavedo is rich in multicellular bodies with spherical or pyriform shapes, which are full of essential oils.

=== Mesocarp ===
The mesocarp (from Greek: meso-, "middle" + -carp, "fruit") is the fleshy middle layer of the pericarp of a fruit; it is found between the epicarp and the endocarp. It is usually the part of the fruit that is eaten. For example, the mesocarp makes up most of the edible part of a peach, and a considerable part of a tomato. "Mesocarp" may also refer to any fruit that is fleshy throughout.

In a hesperidium, the mesocarp is the inner part of the peel and is commonly removed before eating, as is found in citrus fruit. It is also referred to as albedo or pith. In citron fruit, where the mesocarp is the most prominent part, it is used to produce succade.

=== Endocarp ===
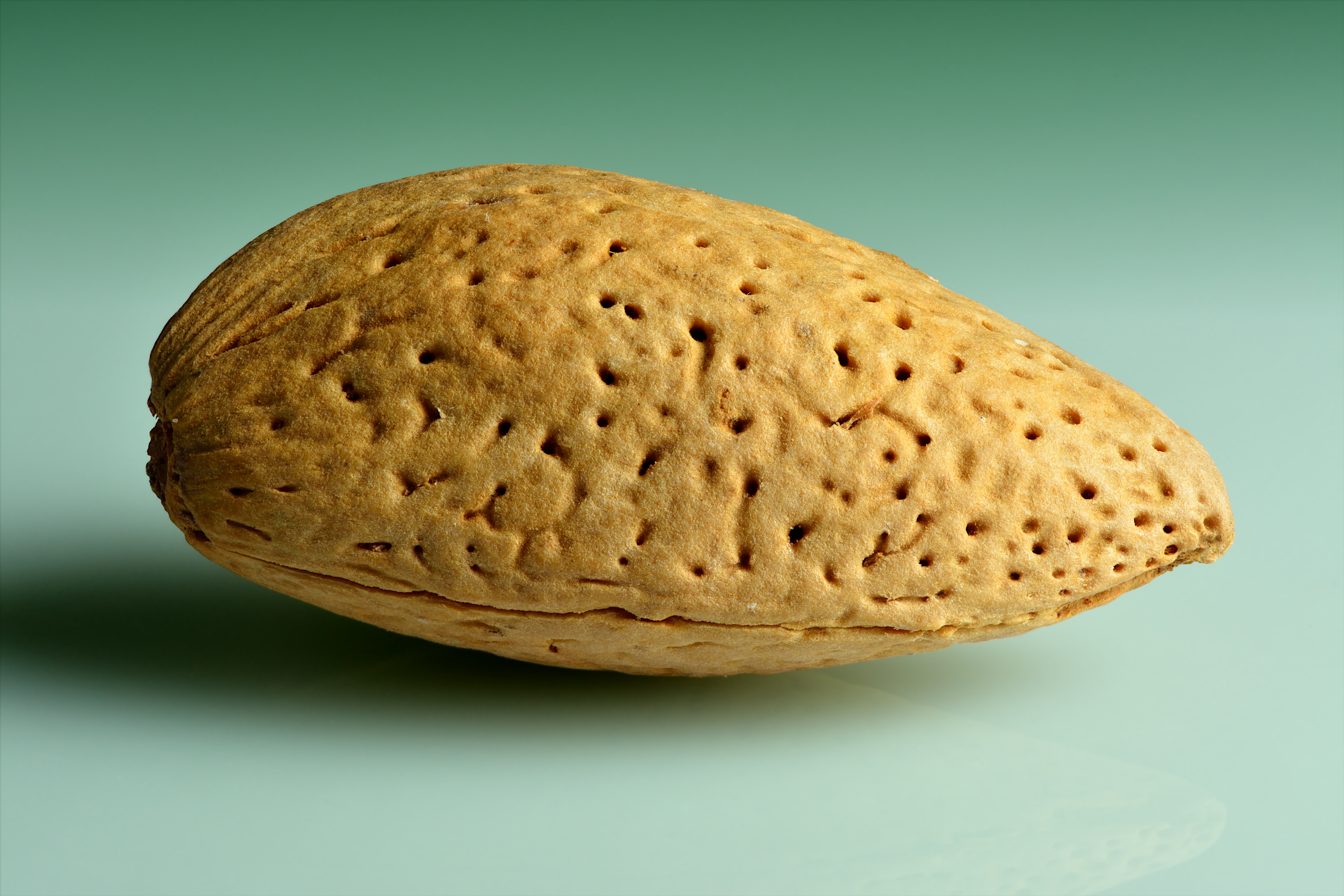
Almond endocarp

Endocarp (from Greek: endo-, "inside" + -carp, "fruit") or putamen are botanical terms for the inside layer of the pericarp (or fruit), which directly surrounds the seeds. It may be membranous as in citrus where it is the only part consumed, or thick and hard as in the pyrenas of drupe fruits of the family Rosaceae such as peaches, cherries, plums, and apricots.

In nuts, it is the stony layer that surrounds the kernel of pecans, walnuts, etc., and that is removed before consumption.

In citrus fruits, the endocarp is separated into sections, which are called segments. These segments are filled with juice vesicles, which contain the juice of the fruit.

== Anatomy of grass fruits ==
The grains of grasses are single-seed simple fruits wherein the pericarp (ovary wall) and seed coat are fused into one layer. This type of fruit is called a caryopsis. Examples include cereal grains, such as wheat, barley, and rice.

The dead pericarp of dry fruits represents an elaborated layer that is capable of storing active proteins and other substances for increasing survival rate of germinating seeds.

== See also ==
- Gynoecium
