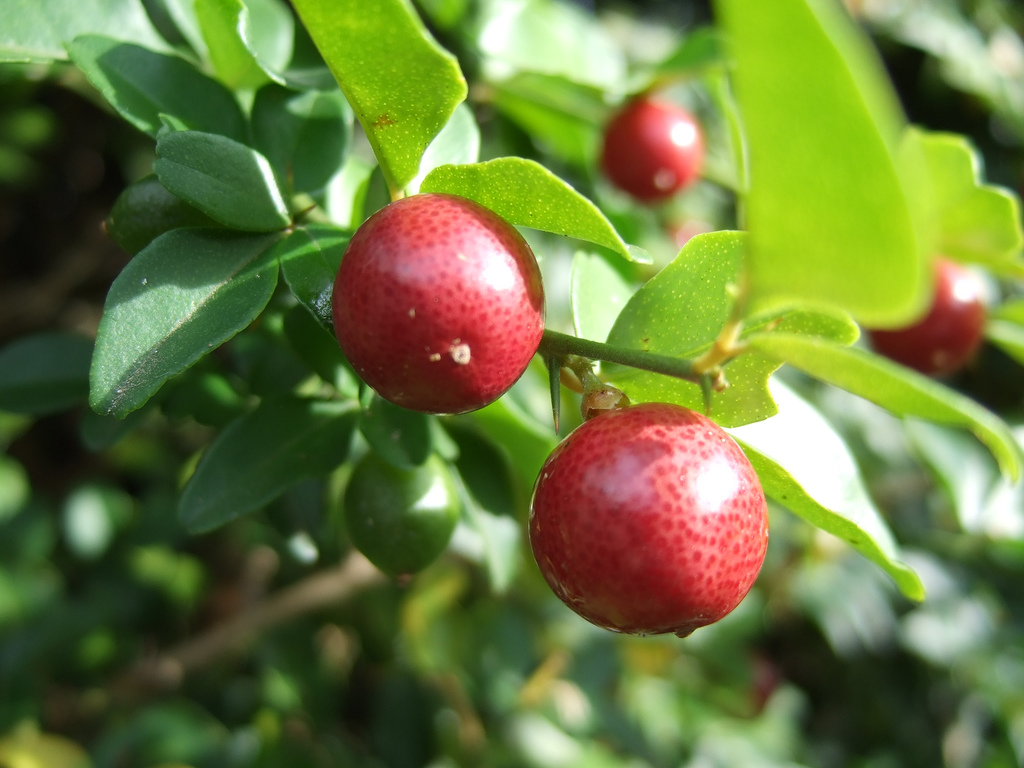
- Foliage and fruit

Scientific classification
- Kingdom: Plantae
- Clade: Tracheophytes
- Clade: Angiosperms
- Clade: Eudicots
- Clade: Rosids
- Order: Sapindales
- Family: Rutaceae
- Genus: Triphasia
- Species: T. trifolia

Binomial name
- Triphasia trifolia (Burm.f.) P.Wils.

= Triphasia trifolia =

Berry and plant

Triphasia trifolia (syn. Limonia trifolia Burm. f., Triphasia aurantiola Lour.; also called limeberry, lime berry, "sweet lime" or limoncitong kastila) is a species of Triphasia in the family Rutaceae, native to tropical southeastern Asia, especially in Indonesian islands and Philippines and possibly elsewhere.

Triphasias are very close relatives of citrus.

== Description ==
It is a spiny evergreen shrub (rarely a small tree), growing to 3 m tall. The leaves are trifoliate, glossy dark green, each leaflet 2–4 cm long and 1.5–2 cm broad. The flowers are white, with three petals 10–13 mm long and 4 mm broad.

The fruit is a red, edible hesperidium 10–15 mm diameter, similar to a small Citrus fruit. The fruit flesh is pulpy, with a flavor reminiscent of a slightly sweet lime.

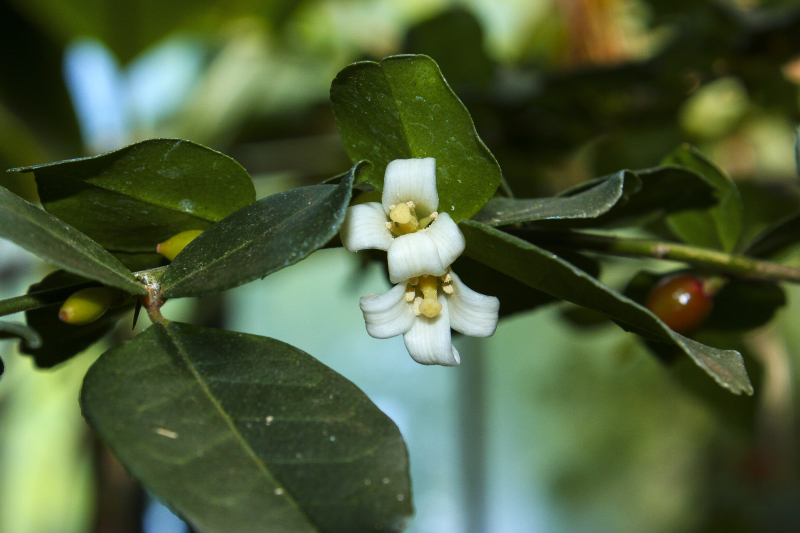
T. trifolia blossoms

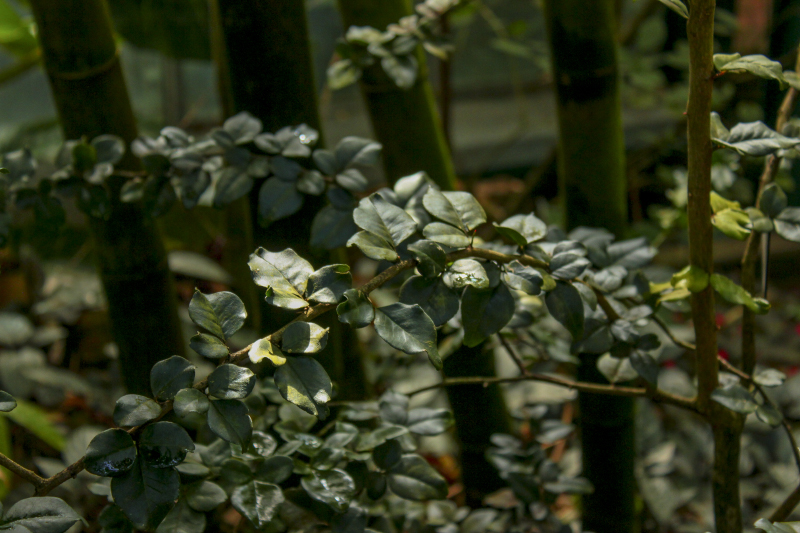
T. trifolia foliage

== Cultivation and uses ==
It is grown for its edible fruit, and has been widely introduced to other subtropical to tropical regions of the world; it has become naturalized on a number of islands in the tropical Pacific Ocean. It has also been noted as a potential invasive in several Indian Ocean archipelagos, and along the United States Gulf Coast from Florida to Texas as well as in the Caribbean. The limeberry has gained some popularity as a bonsai plant. More tropical than true citrus, it must be kept in greenhouses even in many locations where true citrus thrive. In true tropical locations, limeberry may have some promise as a potential commercial fruit crop.

Additionally, the leaves on the limeberry plant are known to have antimicrobial properties housed inside the chemical component of the flowers. As such, there have been cases in the North Pacific Islands where limeberry has been consumed to treat lung cancer and pneumonia. However, more studies are needed to make a definitive claim regarding its medicinal uses. This tree is also considered a weed in other introduced locations.

== See also ==
- Classification of Triphasia
