= Ovary (botany) =

Flowering plant reproductive part

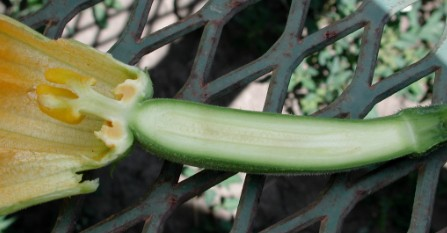
Longitudinal section of female flower of a squash showing pistil (=ovary+style+stigma), ovules, and petals. The petals and sepals are above the ovary; such a flower is said to have an inferior ovary, or the flower is said to be epigynous.

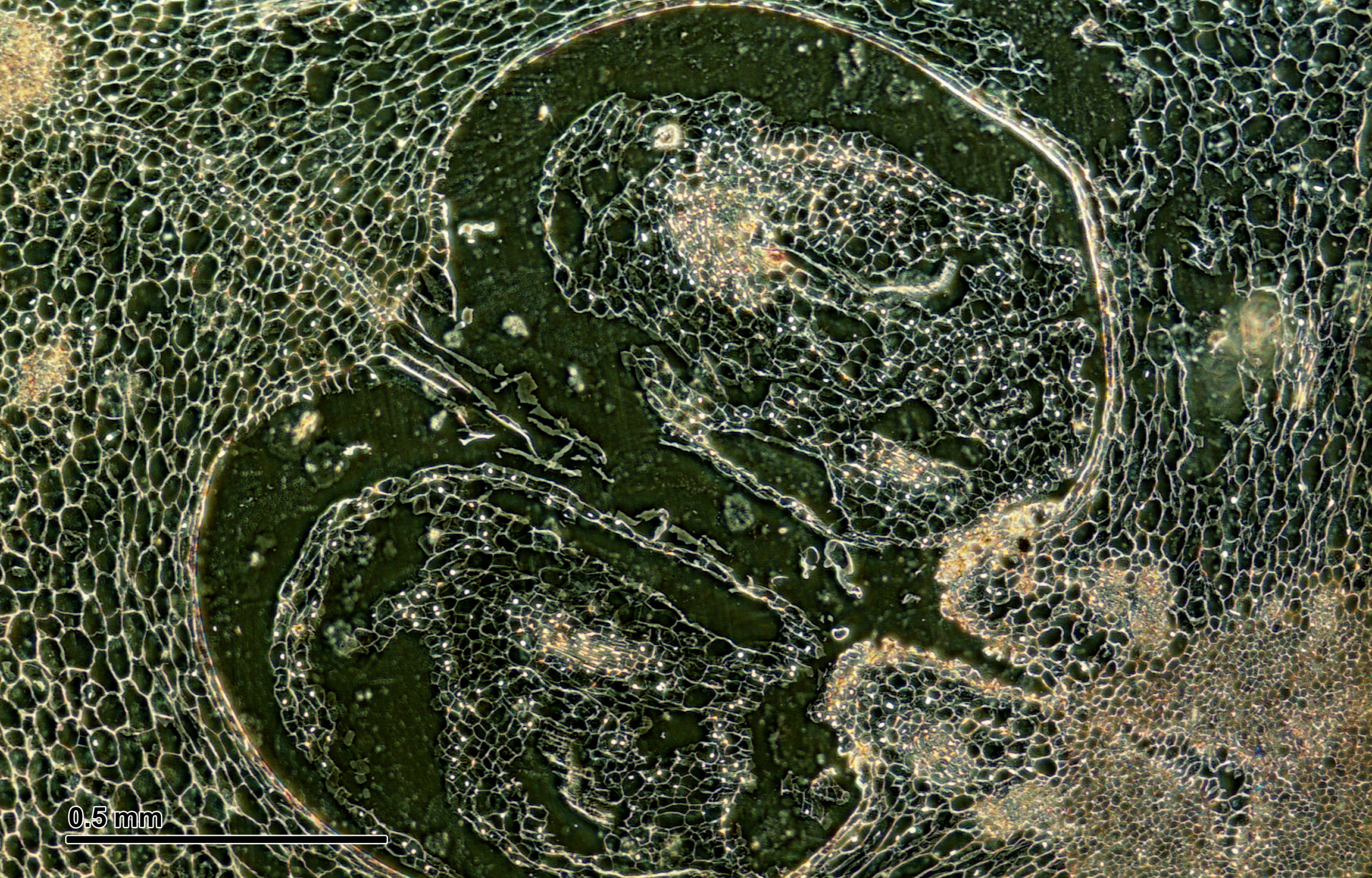
Cross section of a tulip ovary

In flowering plants, an ovary is a part of a flower's female reproductive organ (gynoecium). Specifically, it is the part of the pistil which holds the ovule(s) and is located above or below or at the point of connection with the base of the petals and sepals. The pistil may be made up of one carpel or of several fused carpels (e.g. dicarpel or tricarpel), and therefore the ovary can contain part of one carpel or parts of several fused carpels. Above the ovary is the style and the stigma, which is where the pollen lands and germinates to grow down through the style to the ovary, and, for each individual pollen grain, to fertilize one individual ovule. Some wind-pollinated flowers have much reduced and modified ovaries.

== Fruits ==
A fruit is the mature, ripened ovary of a flower following double fertilization in an angiosperm. Because gymnosperms do not have an ovary but reproduce through fertilization of unprotected ovules, they produce naked seeds that do not have a surrounding fruit. For this reason, juniper and yew "berries" are not fruits, but modified cones. Fruits are responsible for the dispersal and protection of seeds in angiosperms, and cannot be easily characterized due to the differences in culinary and botanical definitions of fruits. Some fruits are also sweet.

=== Development ===
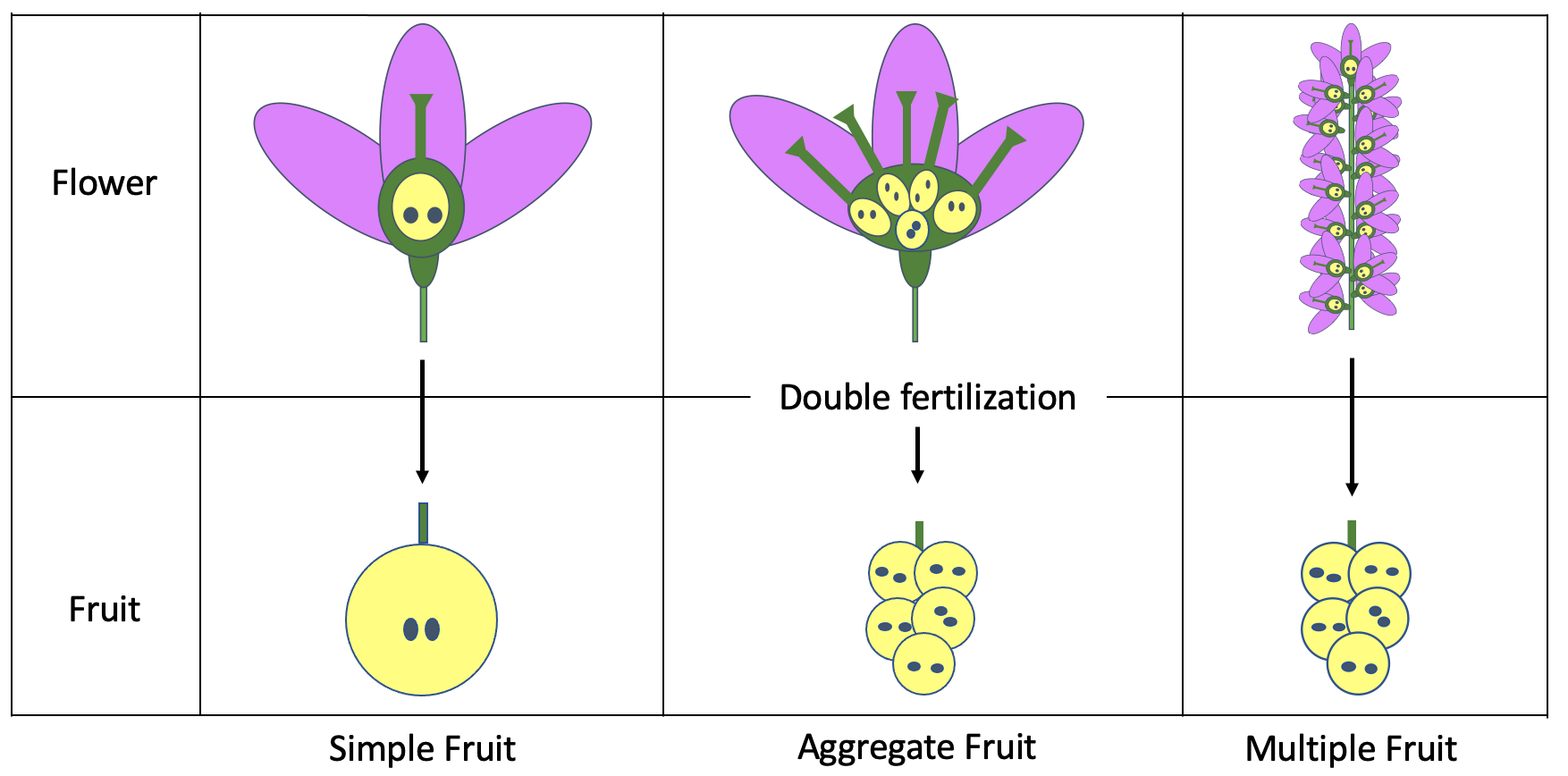
Simple fruits are derived from one ovary of a single flower, while aggregate fruits are derived from many ovaries of one flower. Differently, a multiple fruit is derived from multiple ovaries each from its own individual flower.

After double fertilization and ripening, the ovary becomes the fruit, the ovules inside the ovary become the seeds of that fruit, and the egg within the ovule becomes the zygote. Double fertilization of the central cell in the ovule produces the nutritious endosperm tissue that surrounds the developing zygote within the seed. Angiosperm ovaries do not always produce a fruit after the ovary has been fertilized. Problems that can arise during the developmental process of the fruit include genetic issues, harsh environmental conditions, and insufficient energy which may be caused by competition for resources between ovaries; any of these situations may prevent maturation of the ovary.

=== Dispersal and evolutionary significance ===
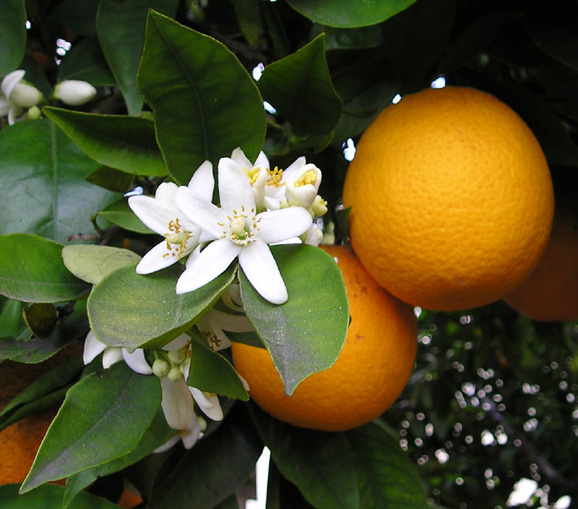
The orange is a simple fruit called a hesperidium. It is the mature ovary of a single orange blossom. Though it seems to have sections when cut open, all of these sections together come from a single ovary that develops into different layers.

Fruits are important in the dispersal and protection of seeds, and variation in fruit shape or size results from an evolutionary response that aids in the dispersal of seeds in different environments. For example, the seeds of large fleshy fruits are often dispersed through endozoochory; this means that animals consume the fleshy fruit and as a result disperse its seeds with their movement. The seeds of fruits can be dispersed by endozoochory, gravity, wind, or other means.

=== Complications and types of fruits ===
There are some complications to the definition of a fruit, as not all botanical fruits can be identified as culinary fruits. A ripened ovary may be a fleshy fruit such as a grapefruit or a dry fruit such as a nut. Further complicating this, culinary nuts are not always botanical nuts; some culinary nuts such as the coconut and almond are another type of fruit called a drupe.

In this same way, not all "fruits" are true fruits. A true fruit only consists of the ripened ovary and its contents. Fruits can be separated into three major categories: simple fruits, aggregate fruits, and multiple fruits. Simple fruits like oranges are formed from a single ovary which may or may not consist of multiple parts, while aggregate and multiple fruits are formed from several ovaries together. Aggregate fruits like raspberries are the ripened ovaries of one flower that form a single fruit, and multiple fruits like pineapples are formed from the ovaries of separate flowers that are close together.

Because aggregate and multiple fruits are formed from many ripened ovaries together, they are actually infructescences or groups of fruits that are arranged together in a structure. Some fruits, like the apple, are accessory fruits which can include other parts of the flower such as the receptacle, hypanthium, perianth, or calyx in addition to the mature and ripened ovary.

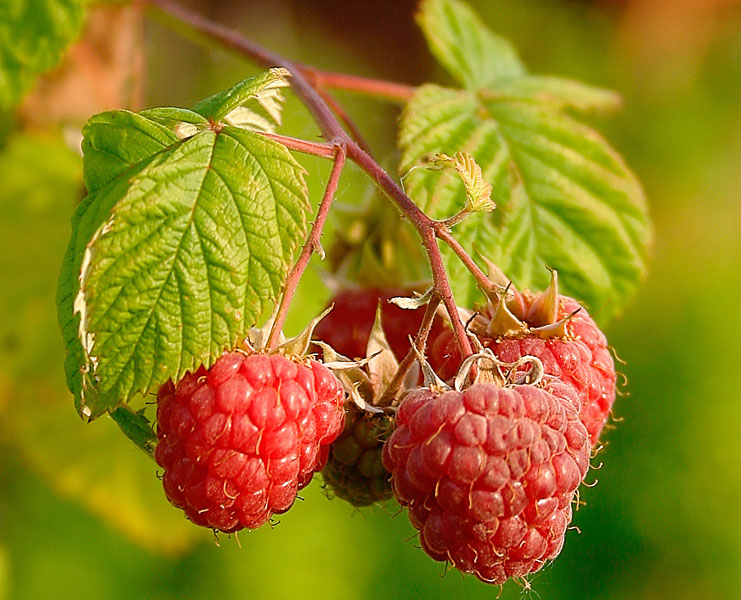
The raspberry is an aggregate fruit. Each raspberry develops from one flower, but its flower has many ovaries that become the small circular drupes making up the raspberry. There is a seed in each drupe.

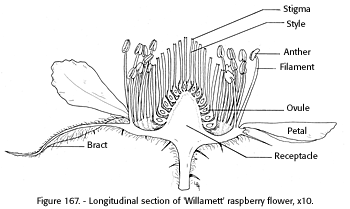
Section of a raspberry flower

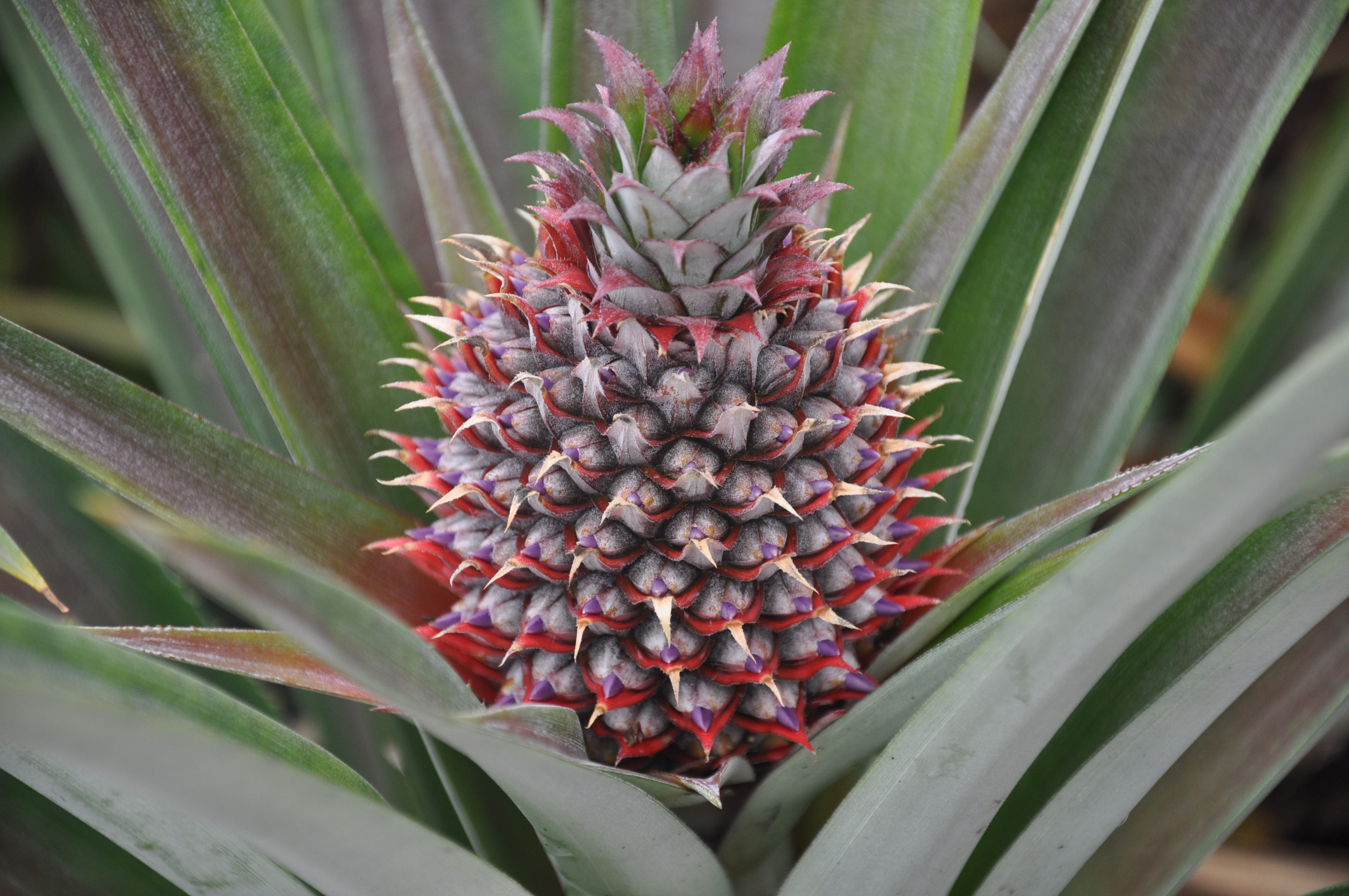
The pineapple is a multiple fruit. Each of the purple spikes in this picture are a separate flower, so the whole structure is an inflorescence. This means that the small sections of a pineapple are each a fruit that develop from a separate ovary, and together they make up a multiple fruit.

== Parts of the ovary ==
Locules are chambers within the ovary of the flower and fruits. The locules contain the ovules (seeds), and may or may not be filled with fruit flesh. Depending on the number of locules in the ovary, fruits can be classified as uni-locular (unilocular), bi-locular, tri-locular or multi-locular. Some plants have septa between the carpels; the number of locules present in a gynoecium may be equal to or less than the number of carpels, depending on whether septa are present.

The ovules are attached to parts of the interior ovary walls called the placentae. Placental areas occur in various positions, corresponding to various parts of the carpels that make up the ovary. See Ovule#Location within the plant. An obturator is present in the ovary of some plants, near the micropyle of each ovule. It is an outgrowth of the placenta, important in nourishing and guiding pollen tubes to the micropyle.

The ovary of some types of fruit is dehiscent; the ovary wall splits into sections called valves. There is no standard correspondence between the valves and the position of the septa; the valves may separate by splitting the septa (septicidal dehiscence), or by spitting between them (loculicidal dehiscence), or the ovary may open in other ways, as through pores or because a cap falls off.

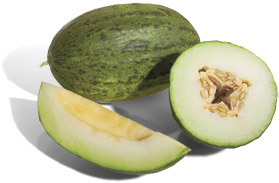
The syncarpous ovary of this melon is made up of four carpels, and has one locule.

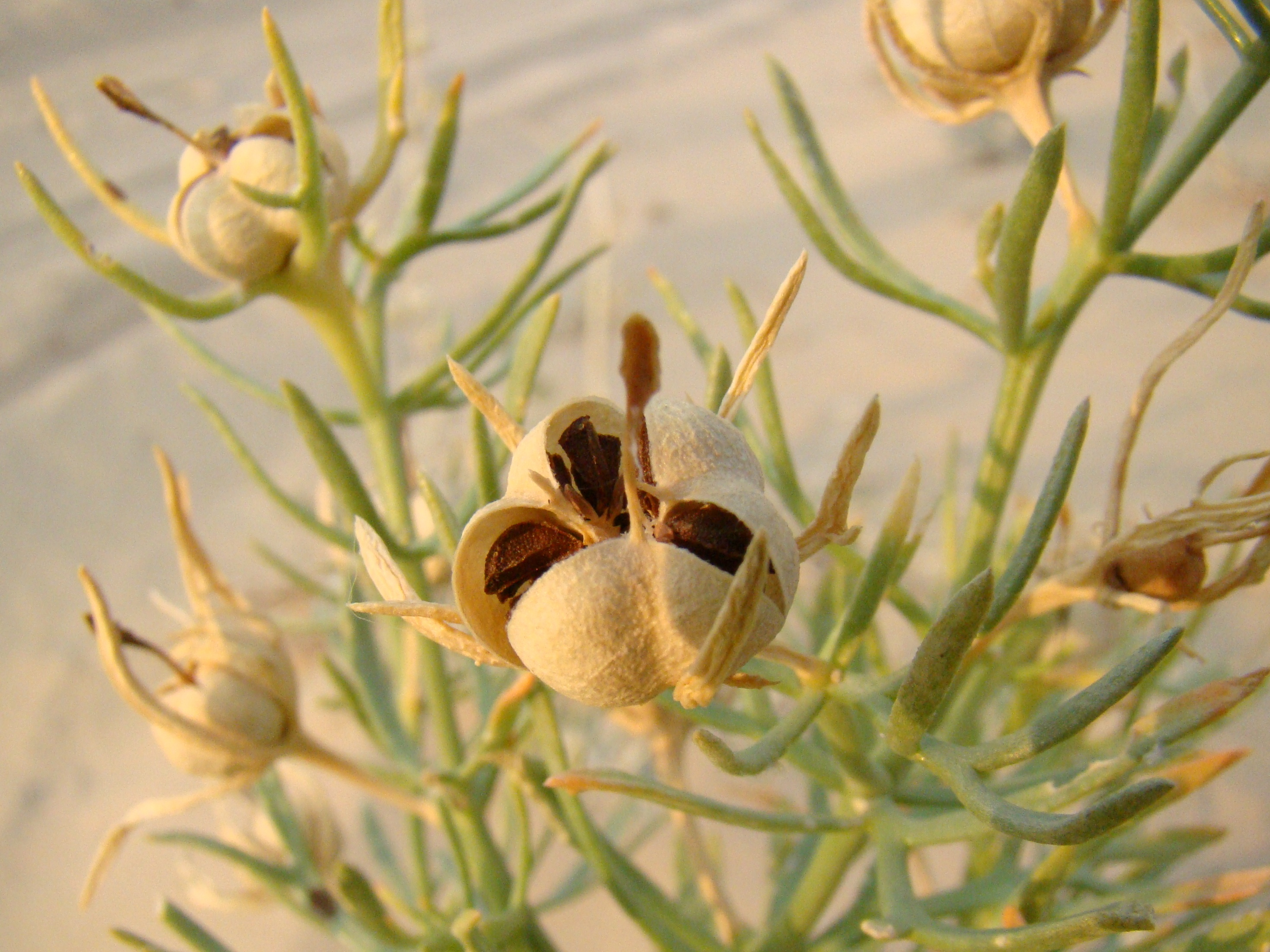
In this Peganum harmala, the ovary of a fruit has split into valves.

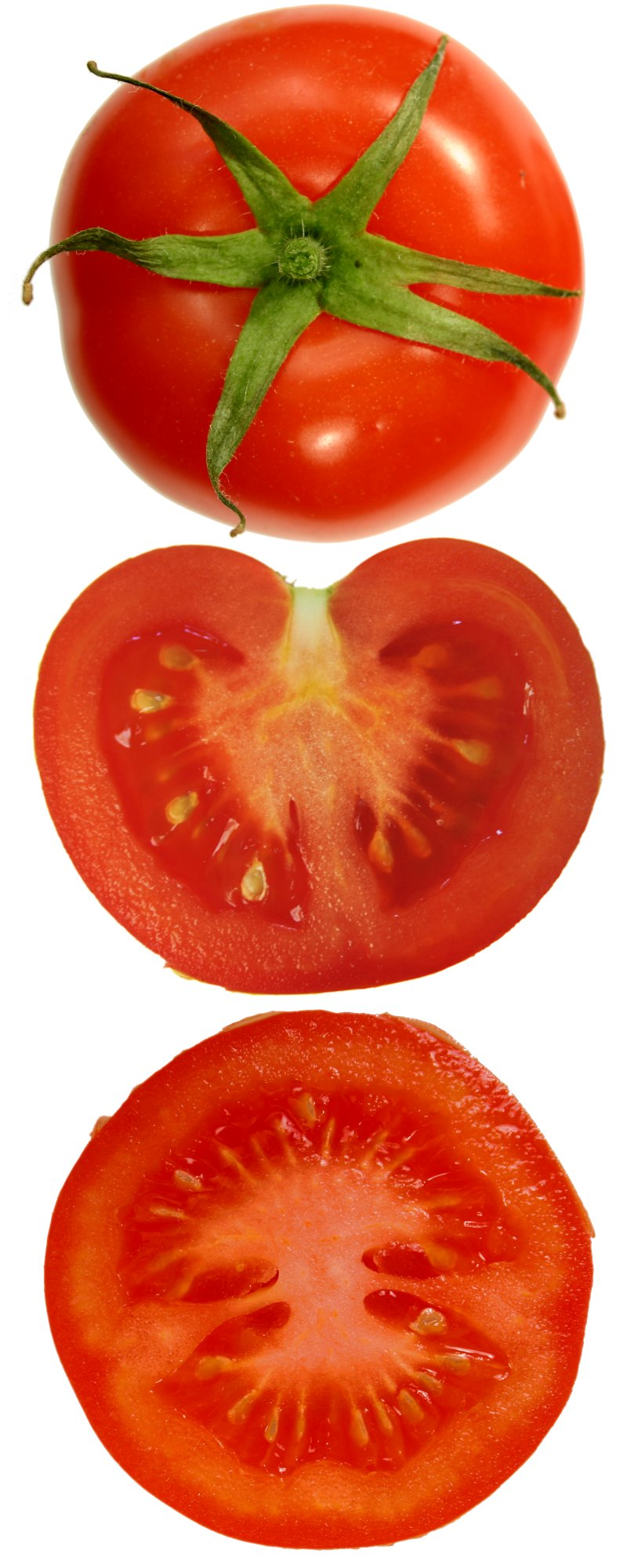
The seeds in a tomato fruit grow from placental areas at the interior of the ovary. (This is axile placentation in a bi-locular fruit.)

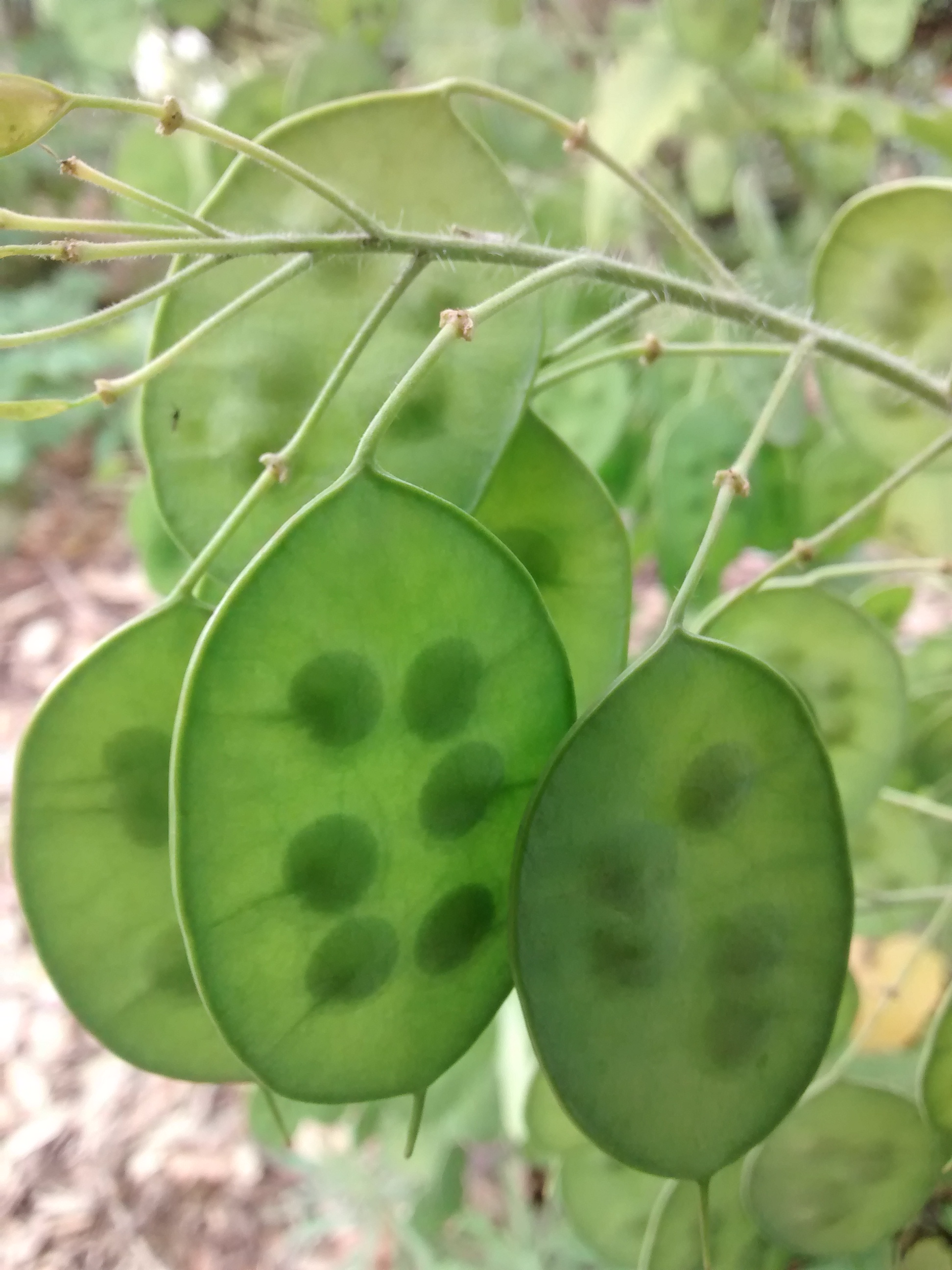
The placentae in Lunaria are along the margins of the fruit, where two carpels fuse. (This is parietal placentation in a bi-locular fruit.)

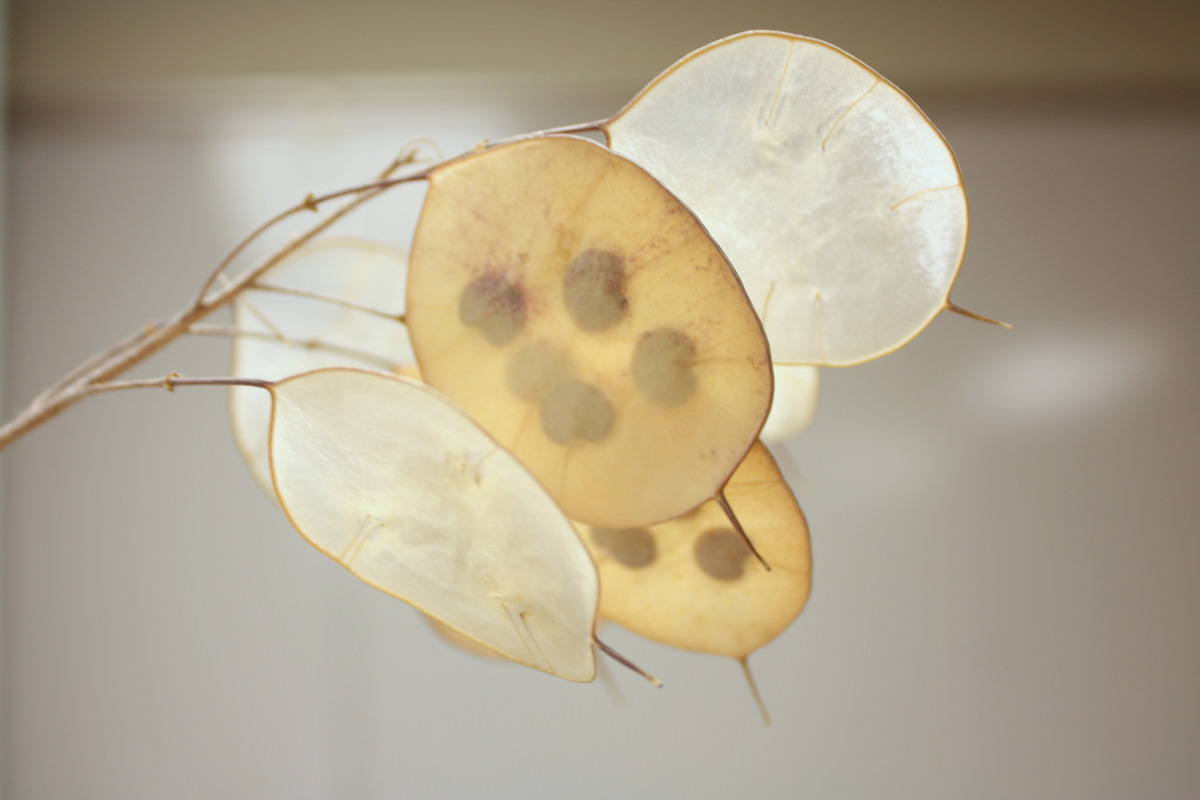
The valves of Lunaria fruit fall to reveal a septum that was between the two carpels of the ovary.

== Classification based on position ==
Ovary insertion: I) superior; II) half-inferior; III) inferior. a androecium g gynoecium p petals s sepals r receptacle. The insertion point is where a, p, and s converge.

The terminology of the positions of ovaries is determined by the insertion point, where the other floral parts (perianth and androecium) come together and attach to the surface of the ovary. If the ovary is situated above the insertion point, it is superior; if below, inferior.

=== Superior ovary ===
A superior ovary is an ovary attached to the receptacle above the attachment of other floral parts. A superior ovary is found in types of fleshy fruits such as true berries, drupes, etc. A flower with this arrangement is described as hypogynous. Examples of this ovary type include the legumes (beans and peas and their relatives).

=== Half-inferior ovary ===
A half-inferior ovary (also known as "half-superior", "subinferior", or "partially inferior") is embedded or surrounded by the receptacle. This occurs in flowers of the family Lythraceae, which includes the crape myrtles. Such flowers are termed perigynous or half-epigynous. In some classifications, half-inferior ovaries are not recognized and are instead grouped with either the superior or inferior ovaries.

More specifically, a half-inferior ovary has nearly equal portions of ovary above and below the insertion point. Other varying degrees of inferiority can be described by other fractions. For instance, a "one-fifth inferior ovary" has approximately one fifth of its length under the insertion point. Likewise, only one quarter portion of a "three-quarters inferior ovary" is above the insertion.

=== Inferior ovary ===
An inferior ovary lies below the attachment of other floral parts. A pome is a type of fleshy fruit that is often cited as an example, but close inspection of some pomes (such as Pyracantha) will show that it is really a half-inferior ovary. Flowers with inferior ovaries are termed epigynous. Some examples of flowers with an inferior ovary are orchids (inferior capsule), Fuchsia (inferior berry), banana (inferior berry), Asteraceae (inferior achene-like fruit, called a cypsela) and the pepo of the squash, melon and gourd family, Cucurbitaceae.

== See also ==
- Fruit anatomy
