= Triphasia grandifolia =

Scientific classification
- Kingdom: Plantae
- Clade: Tracheophytes
- Clade: Angiosperms
- Clade: Eudicots
- Clade: Rosids
- Order: Sapindales
- Family: Rutaceae
- Genus: Triphasia
- Species: T. grandifolia

Binomial name
- Triphasia grandifolia Merr.

Species of flowering plant

Triphasia grandifolia or unifoliate limeberry is a species of the genus Triphasia which is closely related to the genus Citrus and according to some should be including in it. Triphasia is unique with its small red skinned edible fruit, which is about the size of a Greengage.

Grandifolia is named so because of its single large leaves, and was discovered in the Philippines by the abbreviation author Elmer Drew Merrill. This discovery broadened our knowledge on the genus Triphasia.

== See also ==
- Triphasia classification
