= Simple fruit =

Ripened ovary from a single flower

Simple fruits are the result of the ripening of a simple or compound ovary in a single flower with a single pistil. In contrast, a single flower with numerous pistils typically produces an aggregate fruit; and the merging of several flowers, or a 'multiple' of flowers, results in a 'multiple' fruit. A simple fruit is further classified as either dry or fleshy.

== Types of simple fruits ==
=== Dry simple fruits ===
- Achene – most commonly seen in aggregate fruits (e.g., strawberry).
- Capsule – (Brazil nut: botanically, it is not a nut).
- Caryopsis – (cereal grains, including wheat, rice, oats, barley).
- Cypsela – an achene-like fruit derived from the individual florets in a capitulum: (dandelion).
- Fibrous drupe – (coconut, walnut: botanically, neither is a true nut.).
- Follicle – follicles are formed from a single carpel, and opens by one suture: (milkweed); also commonly seen in aggregate fruits: (magnolia, peony).
- Legume – (bean, pea, peanut: botanically, the peanut is the seed of a legume, not a nut).
- Loment – a type of indehiscent legume: (sweet vetch or wild potato).
- Nut – (beechnut, hazelnut, acorn (of the oak): botanically, these are true nuts).
- Samara – (ash, elm, maple key).
- Schizocarp – (carrot seed).
- Silique – (radish seed).
- Silicle – (shepherd's purse).
- Utricle – (beet, Rumex).

Fruits in which part or all of the pericarp (fruit wall) is fleshy at maturity are termed fleshy simple fruits.

=== Fleshy simple fruits ===
- Berry – the berry is the most common type of fleshy fruit. The entire outer layer of the ovary wall ripens into a potentially edible "pericarp", (see below).
- Stone fruit or drupe – the definitive characteristic of a drupe is the hard, "lignified" stone (sometimes called the "pit"). It is derived from the ovary wall of the flower: apricot, cherry, olive, peach, plum, mango.
- Pome – the pome fruits: apples, pears, rosehips, saskatoon berry, etc., are a syncarpous (fused) fleshy fruit, a simple fruit, developing from a half-inferior ovary. Pomes are of the family Rosaceae

== Seed dissemination ==
To distribute their seeds, dry fruits may split open and discharge their seeds to the winds, which is called dehiscence. Or the distribution process may rely upon the decay and degradation of the fruit to expose the seeds; or it may rely upon the eating of fruit and excreting of seeds by frugivores – both are called indehiscence. Fleshy fruits do not split open, but they also are indehiscent and they may also rely on frugivores for distribution of their seeds. Typically, the entire outer layer of the ovary wall ripens into a potentially edible pericarp.
