= Samara (fruit) =

Non-opening dry fruit with a flattened wing

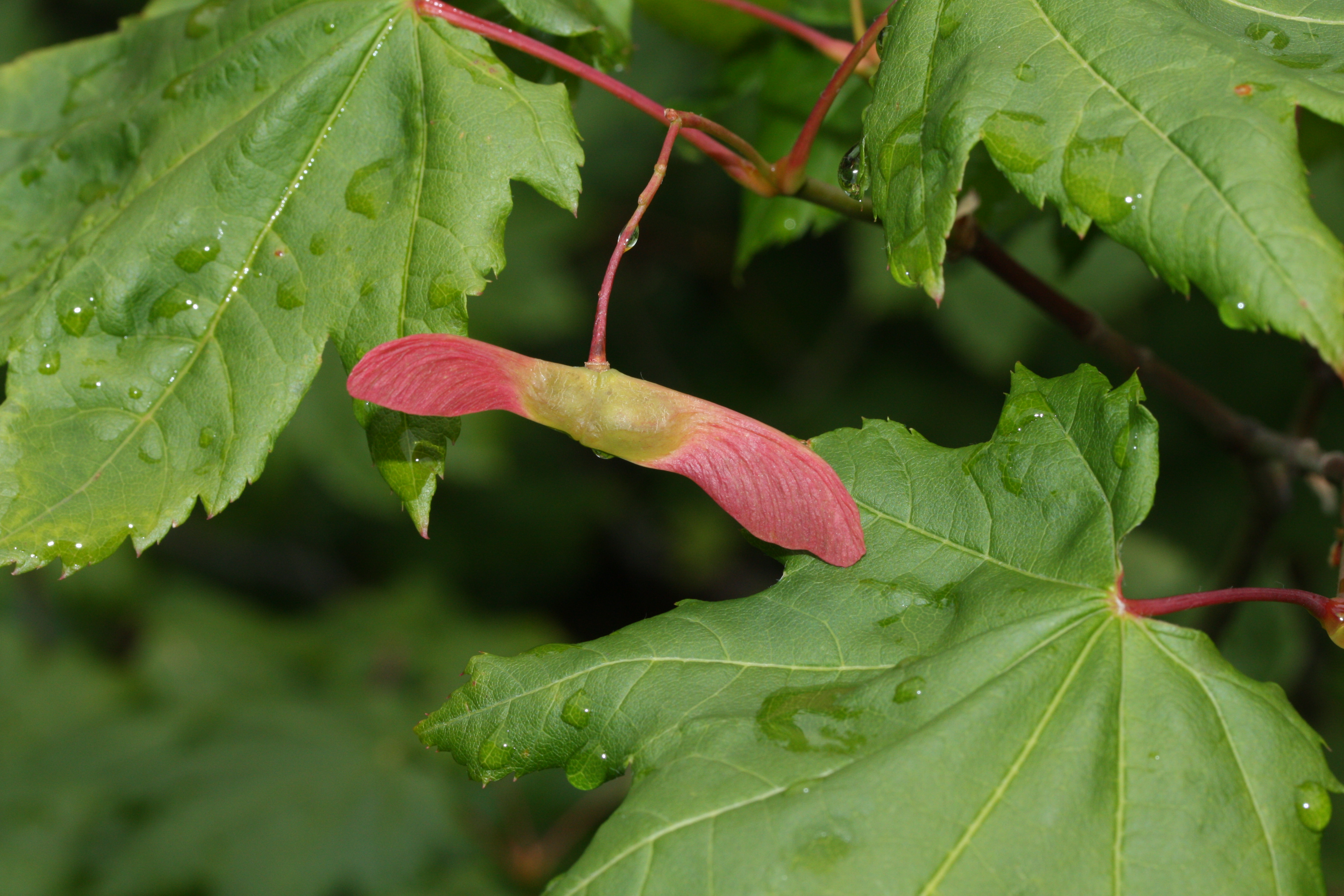
Vine maple (Acer circinatum)

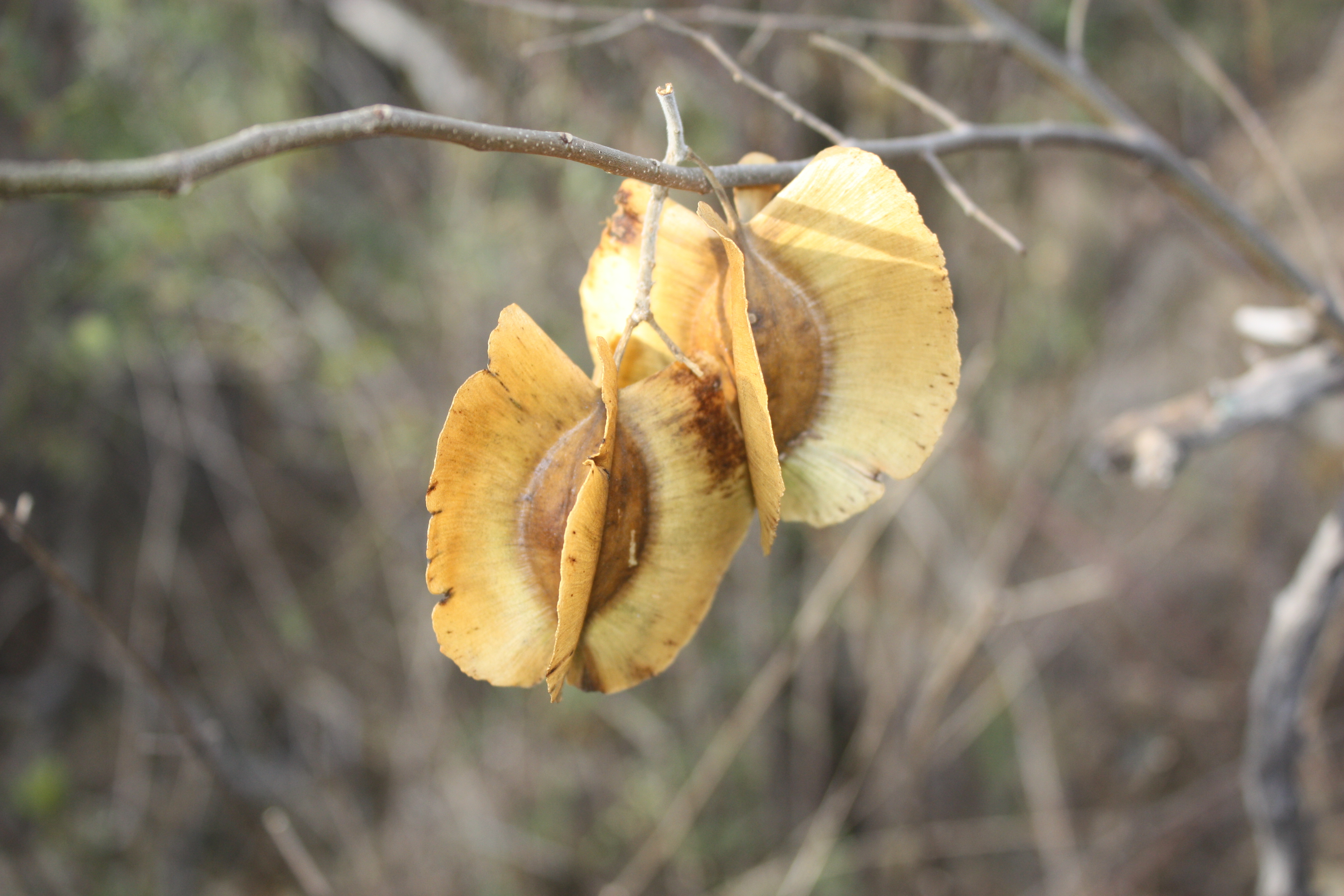
Samara of Combretum zeyheri

A samara (/səˈmɑːrə/, UK also: /ˈsæmərə/) is a winged achene, a type of fruit in which a flattened wing of fibrous, papery tissue develops from the ovary wall. A samara is a simple dry fruit, and is indehiscent (not opening along a seam). The shape of a samara enables the wind to carry the seed farther away from the tree than regular seeds would go, and is thus a form of anemochory.

In some cases the seed is in the centre of the wing, as in the elms (genus Ulmus), the hoptree (Ptelea trifoliata), and the bushwillows (genus Combretum). In other cases the seed is on one side, with the wing extending to the other side, making the seed autorotate as it falls, as in the maples (genus Acer) and ash trees (genus Fraxinus).

There are also single-wing samara such as mahogany (genus Swietenia) which have a shape that enables fluttering.

Some species that normally produce paired samaras, such as Acer pseudoplatanus, can also produce them in groups of three or four.

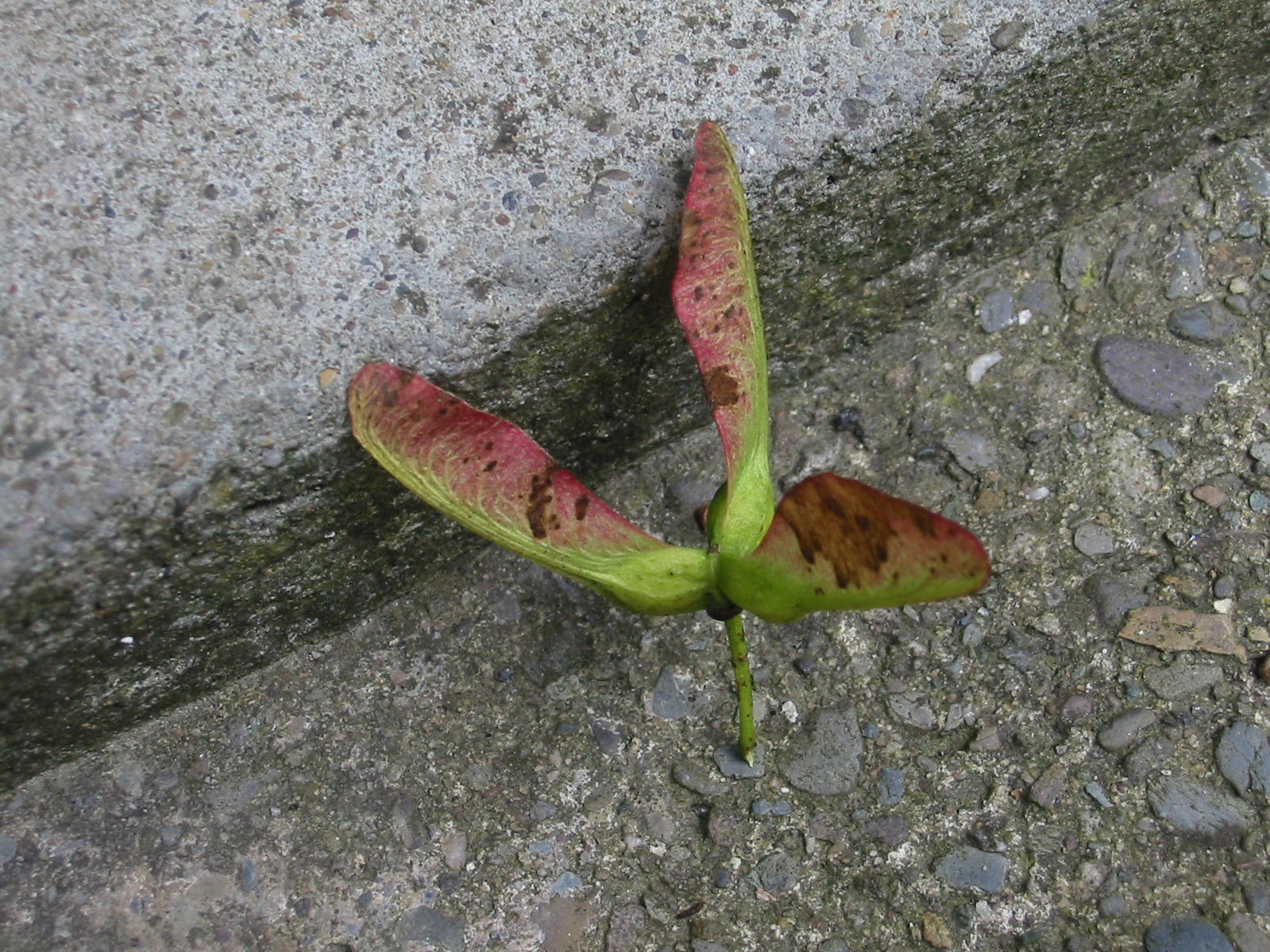
Unusual group of three samaras of sycamore maple (Acer pseudoplatanus. Normally, they are in pairs.)

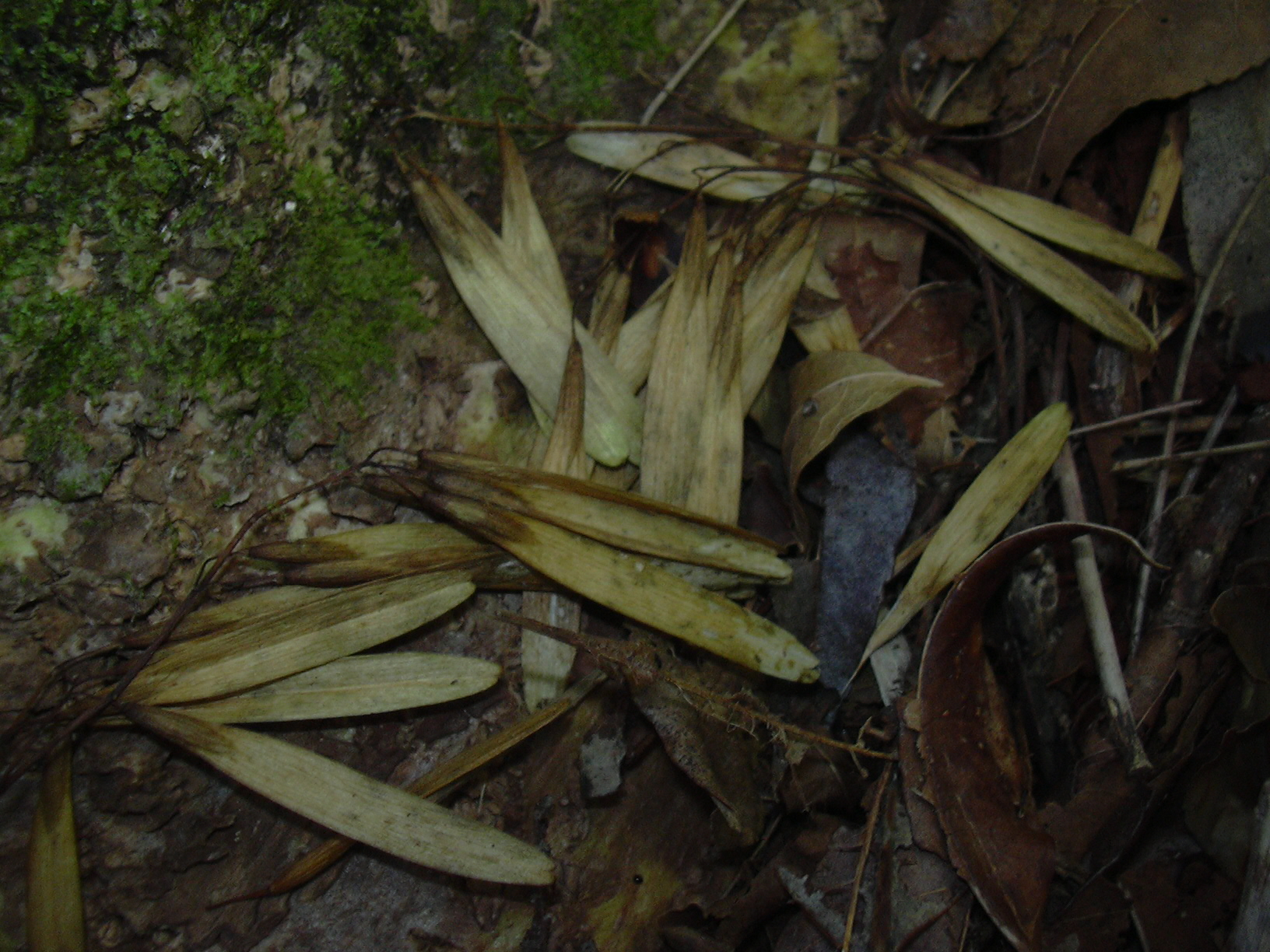
Seeds of the tropical ash (Fraxinus uhdei)

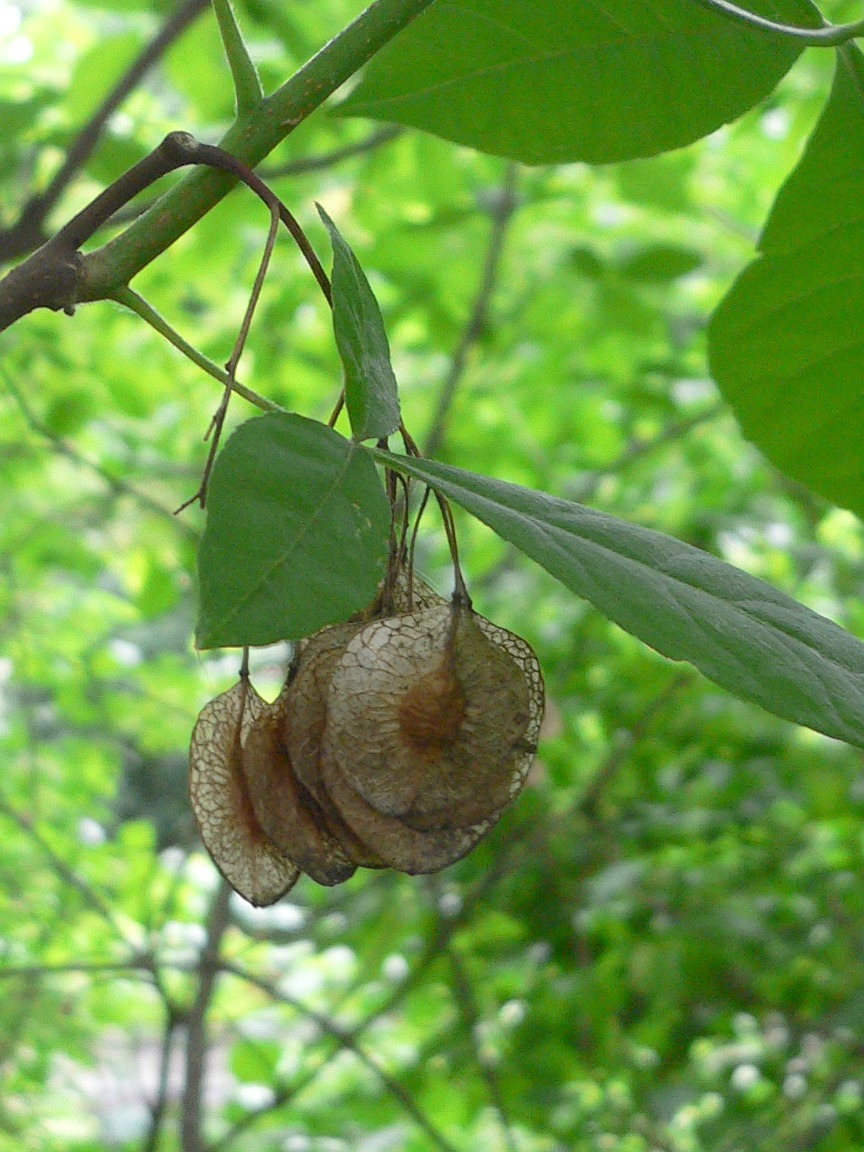
The hoptree (Ptelea trifoliata)

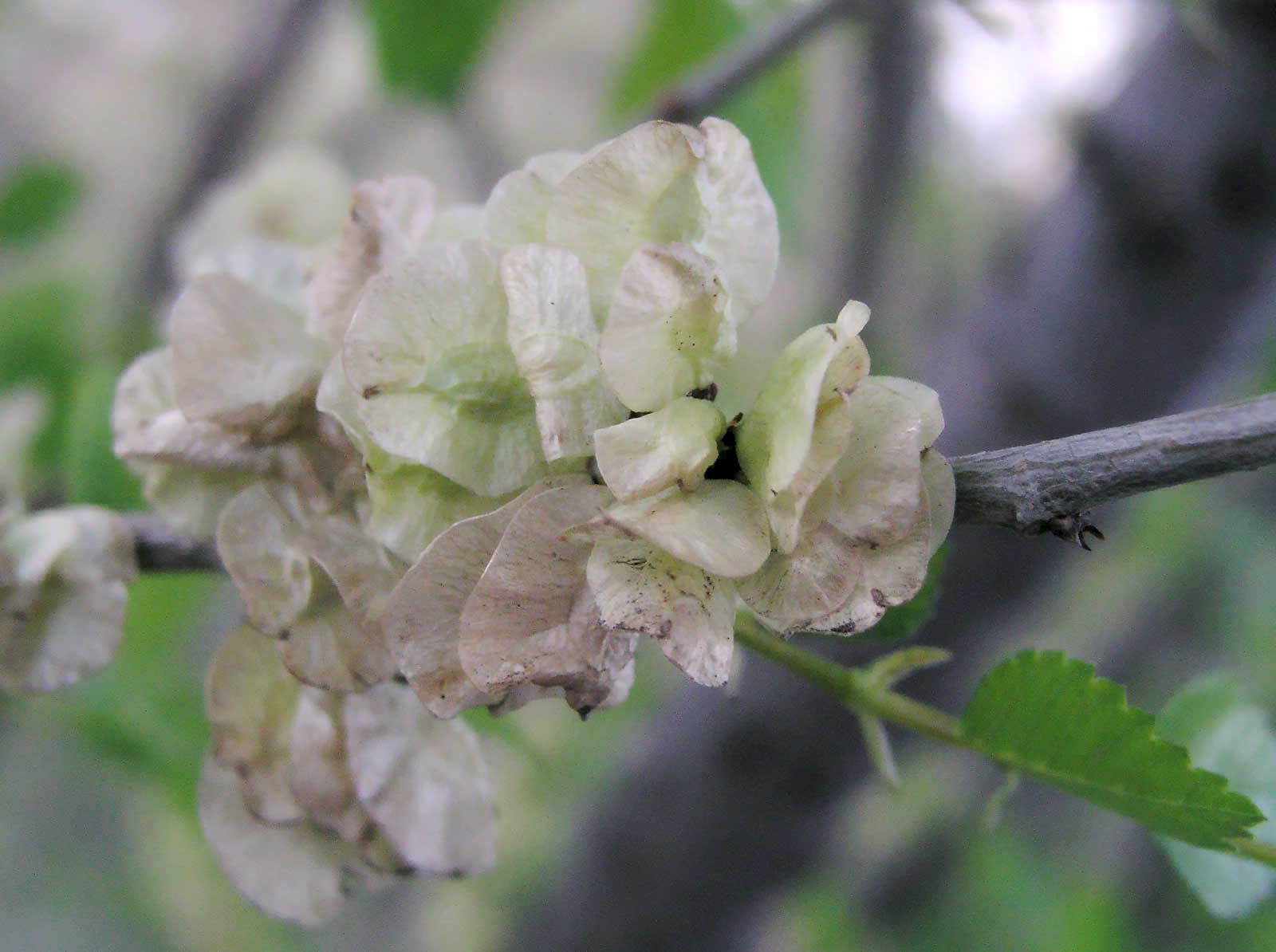
The Siberian elm (Ulmus pumila)

== In culture ==
A samara is sometimes called a key and is often referred to as a wingnut, helicopter, whirlybird, whirligig, polynose, or, in the north of England, a spinning jenny.
