= Hesperidium =

Berry with a leathery rind

Structure of a Citrus hesperidium

A hesperidium (pl.: hesperidia) is a modified berry with a tough, leathery rind, as in the oranges and lemons of the genus Citrus.

== Etymology ==
Carl Linnaeus gave the name Hesperideæ to an order containing the genus Citrus, in allusion to the golden apples of the Hesperides.

== Development ==
The outer ovary wall becomes the thick spongy layer of the rind, while the inner ovary wall becomes very juicy with several seeds. The peel contains volatile oil glands in pits. The fleshy interior is composed of separate sections, called carpels, filled with juice vesicles that are specialized hair cells.

== Uses ==
Oranges, lemons, limes, and grapefruit are all common examples of hesperidia. Unlike most other berries, the rind of cultivated hesperidia is generally not eaten with the fruit because it is tough and bitter. A common exception is the kumquat, which is consumed entirely.

The outermost, pigmented layer of rind contains essential oils and is known as the flavedo. When scraped off and used as a culinary ingredient it is called zest. A confection called succade can also be produced by candying the inner rind (known as pith or albedo) of the citron or lemon.

== See also ==
- Fruit anatomy
